= List of Asian dinosaurs =

This is a list of dinosaurs whose remains have been recovered from Asia, excluding India, which was part of a separate landmass for much of the Mesozoic (See List of Indian and Madagascan Dinosaurs for a list of Dinosaurs from India). This list does not include dinosaurs that live or lived after the Mesozoic era such as birds.

== Criteria for inclusion ==
- The genus must appear on the List of dinosaur genera.
- At least one named species of the creature must have been found in Asia.

== List of Asian dinosaurs ==
=== Valid genera ===
Name	Year	Formation	Location	Notes	Images
Abdarainurus	2020	Alagteeg Formation (Late Cretaceous, Campanian)	Mongolia	Inconsistent in phylogenetic placement. Could represent an unknown lineage of macronarians	
Abrosaurus	1989	Shaximiao Formation (Middle Jurassic, Bathonian to Callovian)	China	Had unusually large fenestrae	
Achillobator	1999	Bayanshiree Formation (Late Cretaceous, Cenomanian to Santonian)	Mongolia	Its robust build suggests it was not a cursorial animal	
Adasaurus	1983	Nemegt Formation (Late Cretaceous, Maastrichtian)	Mongolia	Its sickle claw was markedly reduced compared to other dromaeosaurids	
Aepyornithomimus	2017	Djadochta Formation (Late Cretaceous, Campanian)	Mongolia	The first ornithomimosaur named from a dry desert environment	
Agilisaurus	1990	Shaximiao Formation (Middle Jurassic, Bathonian to Callovian)	China	The holotype specimen was discovered during the construction of the museum where it is now housed	
Albalophosaurus	2009	Kuwajima Formation (Early Cretaceous, Valanginian to Hauterivian?)	Japan	Only known from fragments of a skull	
Albinykus	2011	Javkhlant Formation (Late Cretaceous, Santonian)	Mongolia	Preserved in a sitting position not unlike that of modern birds	
Alectrosaurus	1933	Iren Dabasu Formation (Late Cretaceous, Cenomanian)	China	Had long legs which may be an adaptation to pursuit predation	
Alioramus	1976	Nemegt Formation (Late Cretaceous, Maastrichtian)	Mongolia	Possessed an elongated snout with a row of short crests	
Almas	2017	Djadochta Formation (Late Cretaceous, Campanian)	Mongolia	Preserved alongside eggshells which may have come from a troodontid	
Alpkarakush	2024	Balabansai Formation (Middle Jurassic, Callovian)	Kyrgyzstan	Distinguishable by its uniquely apparent, rugose orbital brow	
Altirhinus	1998	Khuren Dukh Formation (Early Cretaceous, Barremian to Albian)	Mongolia	Had a distinctively elevated nasal bone which supported a large nasal cavity	
Alxasaurus	1993	Bayin-Gobi Formation (Early Cretaceous, Albian)	China	Most of the skeleton is known, which allowed researchers to connect therizinosaurs to other theropods	
Ambopteryx	2019	Unnamed formation (Late Jurassic, Oxfordian)	China	Preserves stomach contents containing gastroliths and bone fragments, suggesting an omnivorous diet	
Amtocephale	2011	Bayanshiree Formation (Late Cretaceous, Turonian to Santonian)	Mongolia	One of the oldest known pachycephalosaurs	
Amurosaurus	1991	Udurchukan Formation, (Late Cretaceous, Maastrichtian)	Russia	One specimen may have come from an individual with a limp	
Analong	2020	Chuanjie Formation (Middle Jurassic, Bajocian)	China	Originally described as a specimen of Chuanjiesaurus but it was assigned to a new genus due to several morphological differences	
Anchiornis	2009	Tiaojishan Formation (Late Jurassic, Oxfordian)	China	Analysis of fossilized melanosomes suggests a mostly gray or black body, white and black patterns on its wings and a red head crest	
Anhuilong	2020	Hongqin Formation (Middle Jurassic, Aalenian to Callovian)	China	Closely related to Huangshanlong and Omeisaurus, all forming an exclusive clade of mamenchisaurids	
Anomalipes	2018	Wangshi Group (Late Cretaceous, Campanian)	China	May have been closely related to Gigantoraptor despite its significantly smaller size	
Anserimimus	1988	Nemegt Formation (Late Cretaceous, Maastrichtian)	Mongolia	Had powerful forelimbs with uniquely straight, flattened claws	
Aorun	2013	Shishugou Formation, (Late Jurassic, Oxfordian)	China	Potentially a basal member of the alvarezsaurian lineage	
Aralosaurus	1968	Bostobe Formation, (Late Cretaceous, Santonian to Campanian)	Kazakhstan	Its crest has been interpreted as being arch-shaped as in kritosaurin hadrosaurids, but this cannot be confirmed	
Archaeoceratops	1997	Xinminbao Group (Early Cretaceous, Aptian)	China	Had no horns and only the beginnings of a frill	
Archaeocursor	2025	Ziliujing Formation (Early Jurassic, Sinemurian to Pliensbachian)	China	The oldest and most primitive ornithischian from Asia	
Archaeornithoides	1992	Djadochta Formation (Late Cretaceous, Campanian)	Mongolia	Known from only a partial skull with scratches that may have been created by a small mammal	
Archaeornithomimus	1972	Iren Dabasu Formation (Late Cretaceous, Cenomanian)	China	Unlike other ornithomimosaurs, its feet were not arctometatarsalian	
Arkharavia	2010	Udurchukan Formation (Late Cretaceous, Maastrichtian)	Russia	Described from a series of vertebrae, several of which were found to not belong to this taxon	
Arstanosaurus	1982	Bostobe Formation (Late Cretaceous, Santonian to Campanian)	Kazakhstan	Poorly known	
Asiaceratops	1989	Khodzhakul Formation, Xinminbao Group? (Early Cretaceous? to Late Cretaceous, Aptian? to Cenomanian)	China? Uzbekistan	Potentially a leptoceratopsid	
Asiatosaurus	1924	Öösh Formation, Xinlong Formation (Early Cretaceous, Barremian to Albian)	China; Mongolia	Two species have been named but both are only known from extremely scant remains	
Asiatyrannus	2024	Nanxiong Formation (Late Cretaceous, Maastrichtian)	China	Has been regarded as a potential juvenile specimen of Tarbosaurus	
Auroraceratops	2005	Xinminbao Group (Early Cretaceous, Albian)	China	Known from more than eighty specimens, including complete skeletons	
Aurornis	2013	Tiaojishan Formation (Late Jurassic, Oxfordian)	China	If an avialan as originally described, it would be one of the oldest members of the group	
Avimimus	1981	Baruungoyot Formation, Nemegt Formation (Late Cretaceous, Campanian to Maastrichtian)	Mongolia	Bonebed remains indicate a gregarious lifestyle. It may have formed age-segregated herds for lekking or flocking purposes	
Bactrosaurus	1933	Iren Dabasu Formation, Majiacun Formation? (Late Cretaceous, Cenomanian to Santonian?)	China	Remains of at least six individuals are known, making up much of the skeleton	
Bagaceratops	1975	Baruungoyot Formation, Bayan Mandahu Formation, Djadochta Formation? (Late Cretaceous, Campanian)	China; Mongolia	May have been a direct descendant of Protoceratops which it physically resembles	
Bagaraatan	1996	Nemegt Formation (Late Cretaceous, Maastrichtian)	Mongolia	Recently found to be chimeric as some bones actually come from a caenagnathid	
Bainoceratops	2003	Djadochta Formation (Late Cretaceous, Campanian)	Mongolia	Its supposedly diagnostic features may fall within Protoceratops variation	
Baiyinosaurus	2024	Wangjiashan Formation (Middle Jurassic, Bathonian)	China	Exhibits anatomical characteristics transitional between basal thyreophorans and derived stegosaurs	
Banji	2010	Nanxiong Formation (Late Cretaceous, Maastrichtian)	China	Vertical striations adorned the sides of its crest	
Bannykus	2018	Bayin-Gobi Formation (Early Cretaceous, Barremian to Aptian)	China	Exhibited a transitional hand morphology for an alvarezsaur, having three fingers of roughly equal length with the first one being robust	
Baotianmansaurus	2009	Gaogou Formation (Late Cretaceous, Cenomanian to Turonian)	China	Large but known from only a few bones	
Barsboldia	1981	Nemegt Formation (Late Cretaceous, Maastrichtian)	Mongolia	Possessed elongated neural spines particularly above the hips	
Bashanosaurus	2022	Shaximiao Formation (Middle Jurassic, Bathonian)	China	Its skeleton combines traits of stegosaurs and more basal thyreophorans	
Bashunosaurus	2004	Shaximiao Formation (Middle Jurassic, Bathonian to Callovian)	China	Although described as a macronarian, this has yet to be rigorously tested	
Batyrosaurus	2012	Bostobe Formation (Late Cretaceous, Santonian to Campanian)	Kazakhstan	Remains originally identified as Arstanosaurus	
Bayannurosaurus	2018	Bayin-Gobi Formation (Early Cretaceous, Aptian)	China	Known from a well-preserved, almost complete skeleton	
Beg	2020	Ulaanoosh Formation (Early Cretaceous to Late Cretaceous, Albian to Cenomanian)	Mongolia	Its preserved skull has a rugose texture	
Beibeilong	2017	Gaogou Formation (Late Cretaceous, Cenomanian to Coniacian)	China	Similar to but more basal than Gigantoraptor. Known from only a single embryo still in its egg	
Beipiaosaurus	1999	Yixian Formation (Early Cretaceous, Aptian)	China	Preserves evidence of downy feathers as well as a secondary coat of simpler "elongated broad filamentous feathers" or EBFFs	
Beishanlong	2010	Xinminbao Group (Early Cretaceous, Aptian)	China	Lacked the elongated claws of more derived ornithomimosaurs	
Bellusaurus	1990	Shishugou Formation (Late Jurassic, Oxfordian)	China	Known from a bone bed with the remains of seventeen juvenile specimens	
Bienosaurus	2001	Lufeng Formation (Early Jurassic, Sinemurian)	China	Potentially synonymous with Tatisaurus	
Bissektipelta	2004	Bissekty Formation (Late Cretaceous, Turonian to Coniacian)	Uzbekistan	Analysis of its braincase suggests poor hearing and eyesight but good olfaction and taste. It has been suggested to be a filter feeder	
Bolong	2010	Yixian Formation (Early Cretaceous, Aptian)	China	Originally known from only a skull. An almost complete skeleton was described in 2013	
Borealosaurus	2004	Sunjiawan Formation (Late Cretaceous, Cenomanian to Turonian)	China	Its caudal vertebrae were distinctively opisthocoelous	
Borogovia	1987	Nemegt Formation (Late Cretaceous, Maastrichtian)	Mongolia	Had a uniquely straight, flattened sickle claw, which may have had a weight-bearing function	
Breviceratops	1990	Baruungoyot Formation (Late Cretaceous, Campanian)	Mongolia	Only known from juvenile remains but can be distinguished from other protoceratopsids	
Brohisaurus	2003	Sembar Formation (Late Jurassic, Kimmeridgian)	Pakistan	Originally thought to be a sauropod, but several osteoderms potentially referrable to the genus suggest it may have actually been an ankylosaur	
Byronosaurus	2000	Djadochta Formation (Late Cretaceous, Campanian)	Mongolia	Two juvenile skulls were found in an oviraptorid nest and claimed to be evidence of nest parasitism in this taxon, but both their identity and taphonomy have been questioned	
Caenagnathasia	1994	Bissekty Formation (Late Cretaceous, Turonian to Coniacian)	Uzbekistan	One of the oldest and smallest known caenagnathoids	
Caihong	2018	Tiaojishan Formation (Late Jurassic, Oxfordian)	China	Possessed platelet-shaped melanosomes that produced iridescence as in modern trumpeters	
Caudipteryx	1998	Yixian Formation (Early Cretaceous, Aptian)	China	Two species are known. At least C. zoui did not have secondary feathers attached to the lower arm	
Ceratonykus	2009	Baruungoyot Formation (Late Cretaceous, Campanian)	Mongolia	Several osteological features were described as similar to ornithischians	
Changchunsaurus	2005	Quantou Formation (Early Cretaceous to Late Cretaceous, Aptian to Cenomanian)	China	Had wavy enamel on its leaf-shaped teeth that made them more resistant to wear. This feature is also present in hadrosaurs	
Changmiania	2020	Yixian Formation (Early Cretaceous, Barremian)	China	Preserved in a curled up position as if it was sleeping in a potential burrow	
Changyuraptor	2014	Yixian Formation (Early Cretaceous, Barremian)	China	The largest microraptorian dromaeosaurid known. Had tail feathers almost a foot long	
Changzhousaurus	2026	Jiufotang Formation (Early Cretaceous, Aptian)	China	Its skeleton contains a mixture of traits of various pennaraptoran groups. Feather impressions are also known	
Chaoyangsaurus	1999	Tuchengzi Formation (Late Jurassic, Tithonian)	China	Known by a number of alternate spellings (e.g. Chaoyangosaurus, Chaoyoungosaurus) before its formal description	
Charonosaurus	2000	Yuliangze Formation (Late Cretaceous, Maastrichtian)	China	May have had a long, backwards-curving crest similar to that of Parasaurolophus	
Chialingosaurus	1959	Shaximiao Formation (Late Jurassic, Oxfordian to Kimmeridgian)	China	Had both large spines and smaller plates, similar to Kentrosaurus	
Chiayusaurus	1953	Hasandong Formation?, Xinminbao Group (Early Cretaceous, Barremian to Albian?)	China; South Korea?	Two species have been named, both from teeth. Those of C. lacustris are apparently indistinguishable from those of Euhelopus or Mamenchisaurus	
Chilantaisaurus	1964	Ulansuhai Formation (Late Cretaceous, Santonian to Campanian?)	China	Had a particularly hooked claw on its first finger	
Chingkankousaurus	1958	Wangshi Group (Late Cretaceous, Campanian)	China	Known from only a scapula. Possibly a tyrannosauroid	
Chinshakiangosaurus	1992	Fengjiahe Formation (Early Jurassic, Hettangian)	China	Had a U-shaped snout that may have supported fleshy cheeks, an adaptation to bulk feeding	
Choyrodon	2018	Khuren Dukh Formation (Early Cretaceous, Albian)	Mongolia	It had an enlarged nose similar to its contemporary Altirhinus, but it is most likely a separate taxon	
Chuandongocoelurus	1984	Shaximiao Formation (Middle Jurassic, Bathonian to Callovian)	China	A tetanuran of uncertain relationships	
Chuanjiesaurus	2000	Chuanjie Formation (Middle Jurassic, Bathonian)	China	One of the most derived mamenchisaurids	
Chuanqilong	2014	Jiufotang Formation (Early Cretaceous, Barremian to Aptian)	China	May have been the adult form of the coeval Liaoningosaurus	
Chungkingosaurus	1983	Shaximiao Formation (Late Jurassic, Oxfordian)	China	May have possessed at least six thagomizer spikes. The rearmost pair was mounted horizontally, directed outwards and backwards	
Chuxiongosaurus	2010	Lufeng Formation (Early Jurassic, Hettangian to Pliensbachian)	China	Potentially a synonym of Jingshanosaurus	
Citipati	2001	Djadochta Formation (Late Cretaceous, Campanian)	Mongolia	Had a distinctive triangular crest. A referred specimen known as the Zamyn Khondt oviraptorid possessed the familiar rectangular domed crest in most depictions of Oviraptor, but likely does not belong to that genus or Citipati	
Conchoraptor	1986	Baruungoyot Formation, Nemegt Formation (Late Cretaceous, Maastrichtian)	Mongolia	Named for a hypothesized diet of shellfish, but this cannot be confirmed	
Corythoraptor	2017	Nanxiong Formation (Late Cretaceous, Maastrichtian)	China	Its crest was vertical and rectangular, not unlike that of a cassowary. May be a junior synonym of Huanansaurus	
Crichtonpelta	2015	Sunjiawan Formation (Late Cretaceous, Cenomanian)	China	Originally named as a second species of Crichtonsaurus	
Crichtonsaurus	2002	Sunjiawan Formation (Late Cretaceous, Cenomanian to Turonian)	China	Sometimes reconstructed with semicircular osteoderms vaguely similar to the plates of stegosaurs	
Daanosaurus	2005	Shaximiao Formation (Late Jurassic, Oxfordian to Tithonian)	China	Its phylogenetic position is uncertain as it is only known from the remains of a juvenile	
Daliansaurus	2017	Yixian Formation (Early Cretaceous, Barremian)	China	Had an enlarged claw on the fourth toe comparable in size to the sickle claw on its second toe	
Dashanpusaurus	2005	Shaximiao Formation (Middle Jurassic, Callovian)	China	One of the basalmost and earliest known macronarians	
Datai	2024	Zhoutian Formation (Late Cretaceous, Turonian to Coniacian)	China	Known from two associated specimens, including their skulls	
Datanglong	2014	Xinlong Formation (Early Cretaceous, Barremian to Albian)	China	Had a uniquely pneumatized ilium similar to megaraptorans	
Datonglong	2016	Huiquanpu Formation (Late Cretaceous, Cenomanian to Campanian)	China	The precise dating of its remains is uncertain	
Datousaurus	1984	Shaximiao Formation (Middle Jurassic, Bathonian to Callovian)	China	One of the rarest sauropods of the Shaximiao Formation, known from only two skeletons and a large, deep skull	
Daurlong	2022	Longjiang Formation (Early Cretaceous, Aptian)	China	Preserves remains of an intestinal tract	
Daxiatitan	2008	Hekou Group (Early Cretaceous, Barremian)	China	Large and relatively long-necked	
Deinocheirus	1970	Nemegt Formation (Late Cretaceous, Maastrichtian)	Mongolia	Had a suite of unique features, most notably a hump supported by elongated neural spines	
Dilong	2004	Yixian Formation (Early Cretaceous, Barremian)	China	Preserves evidence of a coating of simple feathers	
Dongbeititan	2007	Yixian Formation (Early Cretaceous, Barremian)	China	A theropod tooth, likely Sinocalliopteryx, has been found encrusted in one of its ribs	
Dongyangopelta	2013	Chaochuan Formation (Early Cretaceous to Late Cretaceous, Albian to Cenomanian)	China	Coexisted with Zhejiangosaurus but could be distinguished based on subtle osteological features	
Dongyangosaurus	2008	Jinhua Formation (Late Cretaceous, Turonian to Coniacian)	China	Its phylogenetic placement is uncertain	
Doolysaurus	2026	Ilseongsan Formation (Early Cretaceous to Late Cretaceous, Albian to Cenomanian)	South Korea	May have been an omnivore due to the shape of its gastroliths	
Duonychus	2025	Bayanshiree Formation (Late Cretaceous, Cenomanian to Coniacian)	Mongolia	Had only two claws, convergent with other groups of theropods	
Dzharacursor	2025	Bissekty Formation (Late Cretaceous, Turonian)	Uzbekistan	Originally named as a species of Archaeornithomimus	
Dzharaonyx	2022	Bissekty Formation (Late Cretaceous, Turonian)	Uzbekistan	One of the oldest known parvicursorines	
Dzharatitanis	2021	Bissekty Formation (Late Cretaceous, Turonian)	Uzbekistan	Originally described as a rebbachisaurid but later reinterpreted as a titanosaur with possible lognkosaurian affinities	
Elmisaurus	1981	Nemegt Formation (Late Cretaceous, Maastrichtian)	Mongolia	One of the most complete caenagnathids known	
Embasaurus	1931	Neocomian Sands (Early Cretaceous, Berriasian)	Kazakhstan	Known from only two vertebrae	
Enigmosaurus	1983	Bayanshiree Formation (Late Cretaceous, Cenomanian to Santonian)	Mongolia	Had a large, backwards-pointing pelvis	
Eomamenchisaurus	2008	Zhanghe Formation (Middle Jurassic to Late Jurassic, Aalenian to Oxfordian)	China	One of the oldest mamenchisaurids	
Eopinacosaurus	2026	Bayan Mandahu Formation, Djadochta Formation (Late Cretaceous, Campanian)	China; Mongolia	Formerly believed to be a species of Pinacosaurus, but its cranial features make it distinct enough to be recognized as its own genus	
Eosinopteryx	2013	Tiaojishan Formation (Late Jurassic, Oxfordian)	China	Described as lacking advanced tail feathers and long "hind wings", unlike other paravians, but this may be an artifact of preservation	
Epidexipteryx	2008	Haifanggou Formation (Middle Jurassic, Callovian)	China	Supported four long feathers coming out from an abbreviated tail	
Equijubus	2003	Xinminbao Group (Early Cretaceous, Albian)	China	A grazer that preserves the oldest known evidence of grass-eating	
Erketu	2006	Bayanshiree Formation (Late Cretaceous, Cenomanian to Santonian)	Mongolia	May have had the longest neck of any dinosaur relative to its body	
Erliansaurus	2002	Iren Dabasu Formation (Late Cretaceous, Cenomanian)	China	Had long, curved claws on its fingers	
Erlikosaurus	1980	Bayanshiree Formation (Late Cretaceous, Cenomanian to Santonian)	Mongolia	Preserves the most complete skull known from any therizinosaur	
Eshanosaurus	2001	Lufeng Formation (Early Jurassic, Hettangian)	China	Has been suggested to be the oldest known therizinosaur	
Euhelopus	1956	Meng-Yin Formation (Early Cretaceous, Berriasian to Valanginian)	China	Originally believed to have lived in a marshy environment	
Euronychodon	1991	Bissekty Formation (Late Cretaceous, Turonian)	Uzbekistan	The type species was found in Portugal. The Asian species may represent a form taxon of improperly developed teeth	
Ferganasaurus	2003	Balabansai Formation (Middle Jurassic, Callovian)	Kyrgyzstan	Claimed to have two hand claws, but this has been disputed	
Ferganocephale	2005	Balabansai Formation (Middle Jurassic, Callovian)	Kyrgyzstan	Unusually, its teeth were not serrated	
Fujianvenator	2023	Nanyuan Formation (Late Jurassic, Tithonian)	China	Possessed proportionally long legs which may be an adaptation to wading	
Fukuiraptor	2000	Kitadani Formation, Sebayashi Formation? (Early Cretaceous, Barremian to Aptian)	Japan	Similarly to Megaraptor, it was originally reconstructed as a dromaeosaur with its hand claw on its foot	
Fukuisaurus	2003	Kitadani Formation (Early Cretaceous, Barremian)	Japan	The elements of its skull are so strongly fused that it was unable to chew	
Fukuititan	2010	Kitadani Formation (Early Cretaceous, Barremian to Aptian)	Japan	The first sauropod named from Japan	
Fukuivenator	2016	Kitadani Formation (Early Cretaceous, Barremian to Aptian)	Japan	Possesses traits of various groups of coelurosaurs, although it may probably be a therizinosaur. May have been a herbivore or omnivore due to its heterodont dentition	
Fulengia	1977	Lufeng Formation (Early Jurassic, Hettangian to Toarcian)	China	May have been a juvenile Lufengosaurus	
Fushanosaurus	2019	Shishugou Formation (Late Jurassic, Oxfordian)	China	Known from a single femur of immense size	
Fusuisaurus	2006	Xinlong Formation (Early Cretaceous, Aptian to Albian)	China	A referred humerus may support an extremely large size for this taxon	
Gallimimus	1972	Nemegt Formation (Late Cretaceous, Maastrichtian)	Mongolia	Had a relatively long beak with a rounded tip	
Gandititan	2024	Zhoutian Formation (Late Cretaceous, Cenomanian to Turonian)	China	Possibly a close relative of the Mongolian Abdarainurus	
Gannansaurus	2013	Nanxiong Formation (Late Cretaceous, Maastrichtian)	China	Its vertebrae were more similar to those of Euhelopus than to other sauropods	
Ganzhousaurus	2013	Nanxiong Formation (Late Cretaceous, Maastrichtian)	China	Coexisted with at least seven other oviraptorosaurs, which may have niche-partitioned. It was likely primarily herbivorous	
Garudimimus	1981	Bayanshiree Formation (Late Cretaceous, Cenomanian to Santonian)	Mongolia	Was not as well-adapted to running as later ornithomimosaurs	
Gasosaurus	1985	Shaximiao Formation (Middle Jurassic, Bathonian to Callovian)	China	Discovered as a byproduct of construction work	
Gigantoraptor	2007	Iren Dabasu Formation (Late Cretaceous, Cenomanian)	China	The largest known oviraptorosaur, comparable in size to Albertosaurus	
Gigantspinosaurus	1992	Shaximiao Formation (Late Jurassic, Oxfordian)	China	Possessed broad, greatly enlarged shoulder spines	
Gilmoreosaurus	1979	Bissekty Formation?, Iren Dabasu Formation, Khodzhakul Formation? (Late Cretaceous, Cenomanian)	China; Uzbekistan?	Several fossils preserve evidence of cancer-induced tumors	
Gobihadros	2019	Bayanshiree Formation (Late Cretaceous, Cenomanian to Santonian)	Mongolia	Known from multiple specimens representing different growth stages	
Gobiraptor	2019	Nemegt Formation (Late Cretaceous, Maastrichtian)	Mongolia	Possessed a deep jaw that may be an adaptation to crushing bivalves or seeds	
Gobisaurus	2001	Miaogou Formation (Early Cretaceous, Barremian to Albian)	China	Had no tail club but already possessed the stiff tail of derived ankylosaurids	
Gobititan	2003	Xinminbao Group (Early Cretaceous, Aptian)	China	Retained the fifth digit of the foot, a basal trait	
Gobivenator	2014	Djadochta Formation (Late Cretaceous, Campanian)	Mongolia	The most completely known Cretaceous troodontid	
Gongbusaurus	1983	Shaximiao Formation (Late Jurassic, Oxfordian)	China	Only known from a pair of teeth. May be an ankylosaurian	
Gongpoquansaurus	2014	Xinminbao Group (Early Cretaceous, Albian)	China	Remains originally named as a species of Probactrosaurus	
Gongshuilong	2026	Lianhe Formation (Late Cretaceous, Maastrichtian)	China	Possessed elongated spines on its caudal vertebrae that formed a sail-like structure	
Gongxianosaurus	1998	Ziliujing Formation (Early Jurassic, Toarcian)	China	The only sauropod with ossified distal tarsals, hinting at its basal position	
Goyocephale	1982	Unnamed formation (Late Cretaceous, Campanian)	Mongolia	Had a sloping head with a flat skull roof	
Graciliceratops	2000	Bayanshiree Formation (Late Cretaceous, Cenomanian to Santonian)	Mongolia	Possessed a short frill with large fenestrae	
Graciliraptor	2004	Yixian Formation (Early Cretaceous, Barremian)	China	A close relative of Microraptor with characteristically slender bones	
Guanlong	2006	Shishugou Formation (Late Jurassic, Oxfordian)	China	Two specimens have been discovered, one on top of the other	
Halszkaraptor	2017	Djadochta Formation (Late Cretaceous, Campanian)	Mongolia	Originally interpreted as a semiaquatic fish hunter similar to a merganser but this hypothesis has been criticized	
Hamititan	2021	Shengjinkou Formation (Early Cretaceous, Valanginian)	China	Known from seven caudal vertebrae and associated elements	
Haolong	2026	Yixian Formation (Early Cretaceous, Barremian)	China	At least juveniles possessed a coating of hollow, keratinous spines similar to those of porcupines	
Haplocheirus	2010	Shishugou Formation (Late Jurassic, Oxfordian)	China	Possessed three long fingers with short claws. Originally described as a basal alvarezsauroid but similarities have been noted with other coelurosaurs	
Harenadraco	2024	Baruungoyot Formation (Late Cretaceous, Campanian?)	Mongolia	The first troodontid described from the Baruungoyot Formation	
Harpymimus	1984	Khuren Dukh Formation?/Shinekhudag Formation? (Early Cretaceous, Albian)	Mongolia	Mostly toothless but retains a few teeth in the dentary	
Haya	2011	Javkhlant Formation (Late Cretaceous, Santonian to Campanian)	Mongolia	One specimen preserves a large mass of gastroliths	
Heishansaurus	1953	Minhe Formation (Late Cretaceous, Campanian to Maastrichtian)	China	May be a junior synonym of Pinacosaurus	
Helioceratops	2009	Quantou Formation (Early Cretaceous to Late Cretaceous, Albian to Cenomanian)	China	Had a distinctively short lower jaw	
Hexing	2012	Yixian Formation (Early Cretaceous, Valanginian to Barremian)	China	Three or four teeth are known, but they are not well-preserved	
Hexinlusaurus	2005	Shaximiao Formation (Middle Jurassic, Bajocian?)	China	Originally named as a species of Yandusaurus	
Heyuannia	2002	Baruungoyot Formation, Dalangshan Formation (Late Cretaceous, Maastrichtian)	China; Mongolia	Fossilized pigments in referred eggshells suggest they were blue-green	
Homalocephale	1974	Nemegt Formation (Late Cretaceous, Maastrichtian)	Mongolia	Has been suggested to be a juvenile Prenocephale on account of its flat head, but this is no longer thought to be the case	
Huabeisaurus	2000	Huiquanpu Formation (Late Cretaceous, Cenomanian to Maastrichtian)	China	May be closely related to Tangvayosaurus	
Huadanosaurus	2025	Yixian Formation (Early Cretaceous, Barremian)	China	Similar to Sinosauropteryx but its skull shape suggests a different hunting strategy	
Hualianceratops	2015	Shishugou Formation (Late Jurassic, Oxfordian)	China	Had a series of bumps around the edge of the beak	
Huanansaurus	2015	Nanxiong Formation, Tangbian Formation? (Late Cretaceous, Campanian to Maastrichtian)	China	Possessed a distinctive short trapezoidal crest	
Huanghetitan	2006	Haoling Formation, Hekou Group (Early Cretaceous, Aptian to Albian)	China	Had ribs estimated to be 3 metres (9.8 ft) long, which supported one of the deepest body cavities of any dinosaur	
Huangshanlong	2014	Hongqin Formation (Middle Jurassic to Late Jurassic, Aalenian to Oxfordian)	China	Known from some bones of the right forelimb	
Huashanosaurus	2025	Wangmen Formation (Early Jurassic to Middle Jurassic?, Hettangian to Callovian?)	China	Its fossils were found by a school teacher while looking for stones in a river	
Huaxiagnathus	2004	Yixian Formation (Early Cretaceous, Aptian)	China	Slightly larger than the coeval Sinosauropteryx	
Huaxiazhoulong	2024	Tangbian Formation (Late Cretaceous, Campanian)	China	Known from a nearly complete, well-preserved skeleton	
Huayangosaurus	1982	Shaximiao Formation (Middle Jurassic, Bathonian to Callovian)	China	Possessed flank osteoderms and a small tail club in addition to plates and spikes	
Hudiesaurus	1997	Kalaza Formation (Late Jurassic, Tithonian)	China	Had a butterfly-shaped process on its vertebra	
Hulsanpes	1982	Baruungoyot Formation (Late Cretaceous, Campanian)	Mongolia	Closely related to Halszkaraptor but appears to be more cursorial	
Hypnovenator	2024	Ohyamashimo Formation (Early Cretaceous, Albian)	Japan	The first troodontid named from Japan	
Ichthyovenator	2012	Grès supérieurs Formation (Early Cretaceous, Aptian)	Laos	One of its sacral vertebrae was greatly reduced, giving the illusion of a break in its sail or of two separate sails	
Incisivosaurus	2002	Yixian Formation (Early Cretaceous, Barremian)	China	Two specimens of different ontogenetic stages are known, both with differing types of feathers	
Irisosaurus	2020	Fengjiahe Formation (Early Jurassic, Hettangian)	China	Closely related to Mussaurus	
Isanosaurus	2000	Nam Phong Formation (Uncertain age)	Thailand	Originally thought to be from the Late Triassic but it may have actually come from the Early Jurassic or even the Late Jurassic	
Ischioceratops	2015	Wangshi Group (Late Cretaceous, Campanian to Maastrichtian)	China	Noted for its peculiarly-shaped ischium	
Isisaurus	2003	Pab Formation (Late Cretaceous, Maastrichtian)	Pakistan	The only non-avian dinosaur known from both India and mainland Asia	
Itemirus	1976	Bissekty Formation (Late Cretaceous, Turonian)	Uzbekistan	Originally known from a braincase but abundant new remains were described in 2014	
Jaculinykus	2023	Baruungoyot Formation (Late Cretaceous, Maastrichtian)	Mongolia	Was didactyl, with a large first finger and a reduced second finger	
Jaxartosaurus	1937	Dabrazhin Formation (Late Cretaceous, Santonian)	Kazakhstan	Not known from many remains but they are enough to tell that it was a basal lambeosaurine	
Jeholosaurus	2000	Yixian Formation (Early Cretaceous, Aptian)	China	One specimen is preserved in a curled up position	
Jian	2026	Xinminbao Group (Early Cretaceous, Aptian)	China	Described from a geological formation preserving mostly bird fossils	
Jianchangosaurus	2013	Yixian Formation (Early Cretaceous, Barremian)	China	Several characters of its teeth and jaws are convergently similar to those of ornithischians	
Jiangjunosaurus	2007	Shishugou Formation (Late Jurassic, Oxfordian)	China	Had two rows of circular or diamond-shaped plates	
Jiangshanosaurus	2001	Jinhua Formation (Late Cretaceous, Turonian to Coniacian)	China	A potential member of the Euhelopodidae	
Jiangxisaurus	2013	Nanxiong Formation (Late Cretaceous, Maastrichtian)	China	Overall similar to Heyuannia but with a thinner, frailer mandible	
Jiangxititan	2023	Nanxiong Formation (Late Cretaceous, Maastrichtian)	China	Although originally described as a titanosaur, a later analysis recovers it as a somphospondylian placed outside of that group	
Jianianhualong	2017	Yixian Formation (Early Cretaceous, Aptian)	China	Possessed a subtriangular tail frond made of asymmetrical feathers, although it was most likely flightless	
Jinbeisaurus	2020	Huiquanpu Formation (Late Cretaceous, Cenomanian to Maastrichtian)	China	The original describers interpreted it as a medium-sized adult tyrannosauroid, but more recently it has been reinterpreted as a juvenile, probably from a derived tyrannosaurine	
Jinchuanloong	2025	Xinhe Formation (Middle Jurassic, Bathonian)	China	Its skull seems to have had a broader snout in dorsal view compared to Mamenchisaurus youngi and Shunosaurus, but this may have been caused by taphonomic deformations	
Jinfengopteryx	2005	Huajiying Formation (Early Cretaceous, Barremian)	China	May have been capable of some sort of flight	
Jingiella	2024	Dongxing Formation (Late Jurassic, Kimmeridgian?)	China	Initially named Jingia but that name is already in use by a moth	
Jingshanosaurus	1995	Lufeng Formation (Early Jurassic, Hettangian)	China	One of the latest-surviving non-sauropod sauropodomorphs	
Jintasaurus	2009	Xinminbao Group (Early Cretaceous, Albian)	China	Known from only the rear half of a skull, including a complete braincase	
Jinyunpelta	2018	Liangtoutang Formation (Early Cretaceous to Late Cretaceous, Albian to Cenomanian)	China	The oldest ankylosaurid known to have a tail club	
Jinzhousaurus	2001	Yixian Formation (Early Cretaceous, Aptian)	China	Its holotype is nearly complete, preserved whole on a single slab	
Jiutaisaurus	2006	Quantou Formation (Early Cretaceous to Late Cretaceous, Barremian to Cenomanian)	China	Named based on eighteen vertebrae	
Kaijiangosaurus	1984	Shaximiao Formation (Middle Jurassic, Bathonian to Callovian)	China	Potentially synonymous with other medium-sized Shaximiao theropods	
Kamuysaurus	2019	Yezo Group (Late Cretaceous, Maastrichtian)	Japan	Informally referred to as "Mukawaryu" before its formal description	
Kansaignathus	2021	Ialovachsk Formation (Late Cretaceous, Santonian)	Tajikistan	The first non-avian dinosaur described from Tajikistan	
Kayrasaurus	2026	Yixian Formation (Early Cretaceous, Barremian to Aptian)	China	The largest therizinosaur from the Yixian Formation. May be a robust, non-cursorial form	
Kazaklambia	2013	Dabrazhin Formation (Late Cretaceous, Santonian)	Kazakhstan	Morphologically distinct from other Eurasian lambeosaurines	
Kelmayisaurus	1973	Tugulu Group (Early Cretaceous, Valanginian to Albian)	China	One popular book mentions a giant species belonging to this genus, but this referral may be incorrect	
Kerberosaurus	2004	Tsagayan Formation (Late Cretaceous, Maastrichtian)	Russia	Potentially a close relative of Edmontosaurus	
Khaan	2001	Djadochta Formation (Late Cretaceous, Campanian)	Mongolia	Two morphotypes of chevrons are known, which may be a sexually dimorphic trait	
Khankhuuluu	2025	Bayanshiree Formation (Late Cretaceous, Turonian to Santonian)	Mongolia	Remains originally assigned to Alectrosaurus	
Khulsanurus	2021	Baruungoyot Formation (Late Cretaceous, Campanian)	Mongolia	Contemporary with Parvicursor but can be distinguished by characters of its caudal vertebrae	
Kileskus	2010	Itat Formation (Middle Jurassic, Bathonian)	Russia	Uncertain if it possesses the head crest as seen in other proceratosaurids	
Kinnareemimus	2009	Sao Khua Formation (Early Cretaceous, Barremian)	Thailand	Potentially one of the oldest ornithomimosaurs	
Kiyacursor	2024	Ilek Formation (Early Cretaceous, Aptian)	Russia	Represents a relict population of Jurassic noasaurids	
Klamelisaurus	1993	Shishugou Formation (Middle Jurassic, Callovian)	China	Close relatives included several referred species of Mamenchisaurus	
Kol	2009	Djadochta Formation (Late Cretaceous, Campanian)	Mongolia	Had a "hyperarctometatarsus" more strongly pinched than other arctometatarsalian taxa. Described as an alvarezsaurid but has been suggested to be related to Avimimus	
Koreaceratops	2011	Tando Beds (Early Cretaceous, Albian)	South Korea	Possessed elongated neural spines on its caudal vertebrae. Its describers suggest that it was used as a swimming organ, but a later study found it to live in a semiarid environment, making this unlikely	
Koreanosaurus	2011	Seonso Conglomerate (Late Cretaceous, Campanian)	South Korea	Had short but powerful forelimbs, suggesting it may have been a quadruped	
Koshisaurus	2015	Kitadani Formation (Early Cretaceous, Barremian to Aptian)	Japan	Distinguished from other hadrosauroids by the presence of an antorbital fossa	
Kulceratops	1995	Khodzhakul Formation (Early Cretaceous, Albian)	Uzbekistan	Only known from fragments of a jaw and teeth	
Kulindadromeus	2014	Ukureyskaya Formation (Middle Jurassic, Bathonian)	Russia	An ornithischian that preserves evidence of filaments, suggesting that protofeathers were basal to Dinosauria as a whole	
Kundurosaurus	2012	Udurchukan Formation (Late Cretaceous, Maastrichtian)	Russia	May be synonymous with Kerberosaurus	
Kuru	2021	Baruungoyot Formation (Late Cretaceous, Maastrichtian)	Mongolia	Had been informally referred to as "Airakoraptor" prior to its formal description	
Laiyangosaurus	2019	Wangshi Group (Late Cretaceous, Maastrichtian)	China	Some specimens referred to this genus actually belong to kritosaurins and lambeosaurines	
Lanzhousaurus	2005	Hekou Group (Early Cretaceous, Barremian)	China	Possessed the largest known teeth of any dinosaur	
Leshansaurus	2009	Shaximiao Formation (Late Jurassic, Oxfordian to Kimmeridgian)	China	Its braincase is nearly identical to that of Piveteausaurus	
Levnesovia	2009	Bissekty Formation (Late Cretaceous, Turonian)	Uzbekistan	One of the smallest known hadrosauroids	
Liaoceratops	2002	Yixian Formation (Early Cretaceous, Barremian)	China	One specimen was found without a skull roof, possibly displaced by a predator to eat its brain	
Liaoningosaurus	2001	Jiufotang Formation, Yixian Formation (Early Cretaceous, Barremian to Aptian)	China	One specimen has been interpreted as possessing fork-like teeth, sharp claws and stomach contents including fish, which has been claimed to be evidence of a semi-aquatic, turtle-like lifestyle	
Liaoningotitan	2018	Yixian Formation (Early Cretaceous, Barremian)	China	The second sauropod named from the Yixian Formation	
Liaoningvenator	2017	Yixian Formation (Early Cretaceous, Barremian)	China	Uniquely preserved with the head curving forwards, differing from the classic theropod "death pose" and the sleeping position of other troodontids	
Limusaurus	2009	Shishugou Formation (Late Jurassic, Oxfordian)	China	Multiple specimens from different growth stages are known. Juveniles possessed teeth which were lost and replaced with a beak as adults, suggesting a change in diet	
Lingwulong	2018	Yanan Formation?/Zhiluo Formation? (Middle Jurassic to Late Jurassic, Aalenian to Oxfordian)	China	The first confirmed diplodocoid from Asia. Originally considered to date from the Early Jurassic, making it the oldest known neosauropod, but this age has been disputed	
Lingyuanosaurus	2019	Jiufotang Formation?/Yixian Formation? (Early Cretaceous, Valanginian to Aptian)	China	Possessed a mix of basal and derived therizinosaurian traits	
Linhenykus	2011	Bayan Mandahu Formation (Late Cretaceous, Campanian to Maastrichtian)	China	Completely monodactyl due to lacking the vestigial second and third fingers of other alvarezsaurids	
Linheraptor	2010	Bayan Mandahu Formation (Late Cretaceous, Campanian)	China	Potentially a synonym of Tsaagan	
Linhevenator	2011	Bayan Mandahu Formation (Late Cretaceous, Campanian)	China	Had a greatly enlarged sickle claw, comparable in size to those of dromaeosaurids	
Lishulong	2024	Lufeng Formation (Early Jurassic, Sinemurian to Toarcian)	China	Had the largest skull of any Chinese basal sauropodomorph	
Liubangosaurus	2010	Xinlong Formation (Early Cretaceous, Barremian to Aptian)	China	Described only as a eusauropod but has since been reinterpreted as a somphospondylian	
Luanchuanraptor	2007	Qiupa Formation (Late Cretaceous, Maastrichtian)	China	The first Asian dromaeosaurid found outside the Gobi Desert and northeastern China. May have been closely related to Adasaurus	
Lufengosaurus	1940	Lufeng Formation (Early Jurassic, Hettangian to Sinemurian)	China	The rib of one specimen preserves the oldest known evidence of collagen proteins	
Luoyanggia	2009	Haoling Formation (Early Cretaceous, Aptian to Albian)	China	Originally believed to date from the Late Cretaceous	
Machairasaurus	2010	Bayan Mandahu Formation (Late Cretaceous, Campanian)	China	Its hand claws are elongated and blade-like in side view	
Mahakala	2007	Djadochta Formation (Late Cretaceous, Campanian)	Mongolia	Possessed basal traits for a dromaeosaurid. May be a close relative of Halszkaraptor	
Maleevus	1987	Bayanshiree Formation (Late Cretaceous, Cenomanian to Santonian)	Mongolia	Its only purportedly distinguishing trait is also shared with Pinacosaurus	
Mamenchisaurus	1954	Penglaizhen Formation, Shaximiao Formation, Shishugou Formation, Suining Formation (Late Jurassic to Early Cretaceous, Oxfordian to Aptian)	China	Several species have been named, but most may not belong to this genus	
Mandschurosaurus	1930	Grès supérieurs Formation?, Yuliangze Formation (Late Cretaceous, Maastrichtian)	China; Laos?	One of the first non-avian dinosaurs named from Chinese remains	
Manipulonyx	2025	Nemegt Formation (Late Cretaceous, Maastrichtian)	Mongolia	May have used its claws to break open eggs	
Mei	2004	Yixian Formation (Early Cretaceous, Aptian)	China	Two specimens are preserved in bird-like sleeping positions	
Microceratus	2008	Unnamed formation (Late Cretaceous, Turonian)	Mongolia	Originally named Microceratops, although that genus name is preoccupied by a wasp	
Microhadrosaurus	1979	Nanxiong Formation (Late Cretaceous, Campanian to Maastrichtian)	China	Reportedly an unusually small hadrosaurid	
Micropachycephalosaurus	1978	Wangshi Group (Late Cretaceous, Campanian)	China	Had the longest name of any known dinosaur	
Microraptor	2000	Jiufotang Formation (Early Cretaceous, Aptian)	China	Known from over three hundred fossils. Several are well-preserved enough to reveal fine details such as feather covering and an iridescent black coloration	
Migmanychion	2023	Longjiang Formation (Early Cretaceous, Aptian)	China	Its hand combines features of multiple groups of coelurosaurs	
Minimocursor	2023	Phu Kradung Formation (Late Jurassic, Tithonian)	Thailand	The first basal neornithischian known from southeastern Asia	
Minotaurasaurus	2009	Djadochta Formation (Late Cretaceous, Campanian)	Mongolia	The holotype skull was excavated illegally, which obscured its true provenance until recently	
Mongolosaurus	1933	On Gong Formation (Early Cretaceous, Aptian to Albian)	China	Known from only scant remains but has been confidently assigned to the Somphospondyli in recent years	
Mongolostegus	2018	Dzunbain Formation (Early Cretaceous, Aptian to Albian)	Mongolia	Although informally assigned to the genus Wuerhosaurus before its formal description, it may have been either a relative of Huayangosaurus or an early-diverging stegosaurid	
Monkonosaurus	1986	Loe-ein Formation?/Lura Formation? (Late Jurassic, Oxfordian to Kimmeridgian?/Early Cretaceous, Albian?)	China	Poorly known	
Monolophosaurus	1993	Shishugou Formation (Middle Jurassic, Bathonian to Callovian)	China	Possessed a short, rectangular crest running along the midline of the skull	
Mononykus	1993	Nemegt Formation (Late Cretaceous, Maastrichtian)	Mongolia	Proposed to have an anteater-like lifestyle, using its unique forearms to break into termite mounds	
Mosaiceratops	2015	Xiaguan Formation (Late Cretaceous, Turonian to Campanian)	China	Combined features of different groups of basal ceratopsians	
Nagatitan	2026	Khok Kruat Formation (Early Cretaceous, Aptian to Albian)	Thailand	Its discovery suggests a greater diversity of Southeast Asian titanosauriform sauropods than previously thought	
Nankangia	2013	Nanxiong Formation (Late Cretaceous, Maastrichtian)	China	May have been specialized in soft foods such as leaves and seeds	
Nanningosaurus	2007	Unnamed formation (Late Cretaceous, Maastrichtian)	China	Potentially a basal lambeosaurine	
Nanshiungosaurus	1979	Nanxiong Formation (Late Cretaceous, Maastrichtian)	China	Originally misidentified as a sauropod on account of its unusual pelvis	
Nanyangosaurus	2000	Xiaguan Formation (Late Cretaceous, Turonian to Campanian)	China	Completely lost the first digit of its hands	
Napaisaurus	2022	Xinlong Formation (Early Cretaceous, Aptian to Albian)	China	May be closely related to contemporary Thai iguanodonts	
Natovenator	2022	Baruungoyot Formation (Late Cretaceous, Campanian)	Mongolia	Possessed a streamlined body and a long, toothed snout, convergently similar to several groups of aquatic vertebrates	
Nebulasaurus	2015	Zhanghe Formation (Middle Jurassic, Aalenian to Bajocian)	China	Only known from a single braincase, but it is enough to tell that it was related to Spinophorosaurus	
Neimongosaurus	2001	Iren Dabasu Formation (Late Cretaceous, Cenomanian)	China	Could extend its arms considerably forwards due to the structure of its shoulder joints	
Nemegtomaia	2005	Baruungoyot Formation, Nemegt Formation (Late Cretaceous, Campanian to Maastrichtian)	Mongolia	One specimen preserves traces of damage by skin beetles	
Nemegtonykus	2019	Nemegt Formation (Late Cretaceous, Campanian to Maastrichtian)	Mongolia	The second alvarezsaurid named from the Nemegt Formation	
Nemegtosaurus	1971	Nemegt Formation, Subashi Formation? (Late Cretaceous, Maastrichtian)	China? Mongolia	Had a long, low skull similar in proportions to those of diplodocoids	
Ningyuansaurus	2012	Yixian Formation (Early Cretaceous, Aptian)	China	Preserves small oval-shaped structures in its stomach region which may be seeds	
Nipponopelta	2026	Yezo Group (Late Cretaceous, Cenomanian)	Japan	The first ankylosaur found in Japan. Closely related to North American forms	
Nipponosaurus	1936	Yezo Group (Late Cretaceous, Santonian to Campanian)	Russia	Discovered on the island of Sakhalin, which was owned by Japan in 1936 but later annexed by Russia	
Norellraptor	2026	Jiufotang Formation (Early Cretaceous, Barremian to Aptian)	China	Represented by a complete specimen preserving impressions of feathers	
Oksoko	2020	Nemegt Formation (Late Cretaceous, Maastrichtian)	Mongolia	Its third finger was so greatly reduced that it was functionally didactyl	
Olorotitan	2003	Udurchukan Formation (Late Cretaceous, Maastrichtian)	Russia	Had a broad, hatchet-shaped crest	
Omeisaurus	1939	Shaximiao Formation (Middle Jurassic, Bathonian to Callovian)	China	Members of this genus are characterized by extremely elongated necks	
Ondogurvel	2022	Baruungoyot Formation (Late Cretaceous, Campanian)	Mongolia	Known from well-preserved remains of the hands and feet	
Opisthocoelicaudia	1977	Nemegt Formation (Late Cretaceous, Campanian to Maastrichtian)	Mongolia	Walked on its metacarpals due to its complete lack of phalanges	
Oviraptor	1924	Djadochta Formation (Late Cretaceous, Campanian)	Mongolia	Originally mistakenly thought to be an egg-eater	
Pachysuchus	1951	Lufeng Formation (Early Jurassic, Sinemurian to Pliensbachian)	China	Considered a phytosaur from its original naming until a redescription in 2012	
Panguraptor	2014	Lufeng Formation (Early Jurassic, Hettangian to Sinemurian)	China	The first definitive coelophysoid known from Asia	
Papiliovenator	2022	Bayan Mandahu Formation (Late Cretaceous, Campanian)	China	Had a short, subtriangular skull similar to those of Early Cretaceous troodontids	
Paralitherizinosaurus	2022	Yezo Group (Late Cretaceous, Campanian)	Japan	Had stiffened claws that may have been used to pull vegetation to the mouth	
Parvicursor	1996	Baruungoyot Formation (Late Cretaceous, Campanian)	Mongolia	Originally believed to represent a diminutive adult dinosaur, although it was recently reinterpreted as a juvenile	
Pedopenna	2005	Haifanggou Formation (Middle Jurassic to Late Jurassic, Callovian to Oxfordian)	China	Known from a single leg with the impressions of long, symmetrical feathers	
Peishansaurus	1953	Minhe Formation (Late Cretaceous, Santonian to Campanian)	China	Has been compared to thyreophorans and marginocephalians, but it is impossible to determine which assignment is correct	
Penelopognathus	2005	Bayin-Gobi Formation (Early Cretaceous, Albian)	China	Named from a single dentary	
Phaedrolosaurus	1973	Tugulu Group (Early Cretaceous, Valanginian to Albian)	China	May have been a dromaeosaurid	
Philovenator	2012	Bayan Mandahu Formation (Late Cretaceous, Campanian)	China	Closely related to the contemporary Linhevenator but likely represents a separate taxon	
Phuwiangosaurus	1994	Sao Khua Formation (Early Cretaceous, Valanginian to Hauterivian)	Thailand	A large member of the Euhelopodidae	
Phuwiangvenator	2019	Sao Khua Formation (Early Cretaceous, Barremian)	Thailand	Combines features of both allosauroids and coelurosaurs	
Pinacosaurus	1933	Bayan Mandahu Formation, Djadochta Formation (Late Cretaceous, Campanian)	China; Mongolia	May have been capable of producing bird-like vocalizations	
Plesiohadros	2014	Alagteeg Formation (Late Cretaceous, Campanian)	Mongolia	The first hadrosauroid known from the Alagteeg Formation	
Prenocephale	1974	Nemegt Formation (Late Cretaceous, Maastrichtian)	Mongolia	Had a distinctively conical dome	
Probactrosaurus	1966	Miaogou Formation (Early Cretaceous, Barremian to Albian)	China	The closest relative to the Hadrosauromorpha based on the definition of the group	
Prodeinodon	1924	Öösh Formation, Xinlong Formation (Early Cretaceous, Barremian to Aptian)	China; Mongolia	Potentially a carnosaur	
Protarchaeopteryx	1997	Yixian Formation (Early Cretaceous, Aptian)	China	Usually thought to be a basal oviraptorosaur but one study suggests a basal position within Pennaraptora	
Protoceratops	1923	Bayan Mandahu Formation, Djadochta Formation (Late Cretaceous, Campanian)	China; Mongolia	Its remains are so abundant that it has been nicknamed the "sheep of the Cretaceous"	
Protognathosaurus	1991	Shaximiao Formation (Middle Jurassic, Bathonian to Callovian)	China	Originally named Protognathus, but that name is preoccupied by a beetle	
Psittacosaurus	1923	Andakhuduk Formation, Bayin-Gobi Formation, Dushihin Formation, Ejinhoro Formation, Ilek Formation, Jiufotang Formation, Khok Kruat Formation?, Öösh Formation, Qingshan Formation, Tugulu Group, Xinminbao Group, Yixian Formation (Early Cretaceous, Barremian to Albian)	China; Mongolia; Russia; Thailand?	Known from hundreds of specimens, many of them well-preserved. Lived in a broad range	
Pukyongosaurus	2001	Hasandong Formation (Early Cretaceous, Aptian to Albian)	South Korea	One of its caudal vertebrae has bite marks caused by theropod teeth	
Pulaosaurus	2025	Tiaojishan Formation (Middle Jurassic to Late Jurassic, Callovian to Oxfordian)	China	May have made bird-like vocalizations as suggested by its preserved hyoid	
Qianjiangsaurus	2025	Zhengyang Formation (Late Cretaceous, Cenomanian to Maastrichtian)	China	This taxon and Nanningosaurus are the only known hadrosauroids from southern China	
Qianlong	2023	Ziliujing Formation (Early Jurassic, Sinemurian)	China	Associated with fossils of leathery eggs, the oldest of their kind in the world	
Qianzhousaurus	2014	Nanxiong Formation (Late Cretaceous, Maastrichtian)	China	Has been nicknamed "Pinocchio rex" on account of its elongated snout	
Qiaowanlong	2009	Xinminbao Group (Early Cretaceous, Aptian)	China	Originally described as a brachiosaurid but has since been reinterpreted as a euhelopodid	
Qijianglong	2015	Suining Formation (Early Cretaceous, Aptian)	China	Once believed to date from the Late Jurassic	
Qingxiusaurus	2008	Unnamed formation (Late Cretaceous, Maastrichtian)	China	Known from very limited remains	
Qinlingosaurus	1996	Hongtuling Formation?/Shanyang Formation? (Late Cretaceous, Maastrichtian)	China	Potentially a titanosaur given its age, but this cannot be confirmed	
Qiupalong	2011	Qiupa Formation (Late Cretaceous, Maastrichtian)	China	Referred specimens were found in Canada and Russia, making it one of the few Late Cretaceous non-avian dinosaur taxa known from both Asia and Laramidia	
Qiupanykus	2018	Qiupa Formation (Late Cretaceous, Maastrichtian)	China	May have used its robust thumb claws to crack open oviraptorid eggshells	
Quaesitosaurus	1983	Baruungoyot Formation (Late Cretaceous, Maastrichtian)	Mongolia	Potentially a close relative of Nemegtosaurus	
Ratchasimasaurus	2011	Khok Kruat Formation (Early Cretaceous, Aptian)	Thailand	Only known from a single toothless dentary	
Rhomaleopakhus	2021	Kalaza Formation (Late Jurassic, Tithonian)	China	Possessed a robust forelimb that may be a locomotory adaptation	
Rinchenia	1997	Nemegt Formation (Late Cretaceous, Maastrichtian)	Mongolia	Had a tall, domed crest	
Ruixinia	2022	Yixian Formation (Early Cretaceous, Barremian)	China	Its last few caudal vertebrae were fused into a rod-like structure	
Ruyangosaurus	2009	Haoling Formation (Early Cretaceous, Aptian to Albian)	China	Only known from scant remains but it was one of the largest dinosaurs known from Asia	
Saichania	1977	Baruungoyot Formation, Nemegt Formation (Late Cretaceous, Campanian to Maastrichtian)	Mongolia	Possessed complicated nasal passages that may have cooled the air it breathed	
Sanpasaurus	1944	Ziliujing Formation (Early Jurassic, Toarcian)	China	Historically conflated with the remains of an ornithischian	
Sanxiasaurus	2019	Xintiangou Formation (Middle Jurassic, Bajocian)	China	The oldest neornithischian known from Asia	
Sasayamagnomus	2024	Ohyamashimo Formation (Early Cretaceous, Albian)	Japan	At least two individuals are known as indicated by the presence of two right nasal bones among the fossil material	
Saurolophus	1912	Nemegt Formation (Late Cretaceous, Maastrichtian)	Mongolia	The type species was found in Canada. The Asian species is distinguished by its larger size and backwards-pointing diagonal crest	
Sauroplites	1953	Zhidan Group (Early Cretaceous, Barremian to Aptian)	China	Preserved lying on its back with parts of its armor in an articulated position	
Saurornithoides	1924	Djadochta Formation (Late Cretaceous, Campanian)	Mongolia	Its hindlimbs were well-developed even as juveniles, suggesting it needed little to no parental care	
Scansoriopteryx	2002	Tiaojishan Formation (Middle Jurassic to Late Jurassic, Callovian to Oxfordian)	China	Was well-adapted for climbing due to the structure of its hands and feet	
Segnosaurus	1979	Bayanshiree Formation (Late Cretaceous, Cenomanian to Turonian)	Mongolia	One of the first known therizinosaurs. Its relationships were originally obscure	
Serikornis	2017	Tiaojishan Formation (Late Jurassic, Oxfordian)	China	Possessed simple, wispy feathers similar to those of a Silkie chicken	
Shamosaurus	1983	Dzunbain Formation (Early Cretaceous, Aptian to Albian)	Mongolia	The osteoderms on its head were not separated into obvious tiles as with later ankylosaurids	
Shanag	2007	Öösh Formation (Early Cretaceous, Berriasian to Barremian)	Mongolia	Shows a mixture of traits of various paravian groups	
Shantungosaurus	1973	Wangshi Group (Late Cretaceous, Campanian)	China	The largest known hadrosaurid	
Shanxia	1998	Huiquanpu Formation (Late Cretaceous, Cenomanian to Campanian)	China	May be synonymous with Tianzhenosaurus and/or Saichania	
Shanyangosaurus	1996	Shanyang Formation (Late Cretaceous, Maastrichtian)	China	Indeterminate but its hollow bones are a synapomorphy for the Coelurosauria. One study suggests an oviraptorosaurian position	
Shaochilong	2009	Miaogou Formation (Early Cretaceous, Barremian to Albian)	China	Originally interpreted as a carcharodontosaurid, but more recent analyses recover it as a potential tyrannosauroid	
Shenzhousaurus	2003	Yixian Formation (Early Cretaceous, Aptian)	China	Preserves pebbles in its thoracic cavity which may be gastroliths	
Shidaisaurus	2009	Chuanjie Formation (Middle Jurassic, Aalenian)	China	Potentially one of the oldest known allosauroids	
Shishugounykus	2019	Shishugou Formation (Late Jurassic, Oxfordian)	China	Its manus combines features of both alvarezsaurians and more basal coelurosaurs	
Shixinggia	2005	Nanxiong Formation (Late Cretaceous, Maastrichtian)	China	Known from a fair amount of postcranial material	
Shri	2021	Baruungoyot Formation, Djadochta Formation (Late Cretaceous, Campanian to Maastrichtian)	Mongolia	Before its formal description, S. devi was nicknamed "Ichabodcraniosaurus" because its holotype lacked a skull. The second species, S. rapax, can be distinguished from the type by the more robust, shorter snout	
Shuangmiaosaurus	2003	Sunjiawan Formation (Late Cretaceous, Cenomanian)	China	Only known from some parts of a skull	
Shunosaurus	1983	Shaximiao Formation (Late Jurassic, Oxfordian)	China	Possessed a small tail club topped by two short spikes	
Shuvuuia	1998	Djadochta Formation (Late Cretaceous, Campanian)	Mongolia	Displays several adaptations that may point to a nocturnal, owl-like lifestyle	
Siamodon	2011	Khok Kruat Formation (Early Cretaceous, Aptian)	Thailand	May have been closely related to Probactrosaurus	
Siamosaurus	1986	Khok Kruat Formation, Sao Khua Formation (Early Cretaceous, Barremian to Aptian)	Thailand	Only known from teeth. Some spinosaurid postcrania from the same area may be referrable to this genus	
Siamotyrannus	1996	Sao Khua Formation (Early Cretaceous, Berriasian to Barremian)	Thailand	Has been recovered in a variety of positions within Avetheropoda	
Siamraptor	2019	Khok Kruat Formation (Early Cretaceous, Aptian)	Thailand	Possibly the first carcharodontosaurian known from Southeast Asia	
Sibirotitan	2018	Ilek Formation (Early Cretaceous, Barremian)	Russia	Its sacral ribs are star-shaped in dorsal view	
Siluosaurus	1997	Xinminbao Group (Early Cretaceous, Barremian to Albian)	China	Has been suggested to be an indeterminate member of the Cerapoda	
Silutitan	2021	Shengjinkou Formation (Early Cretaceous, Valanginian)	China	Known from six cervical vertebrae associated with a pterosaur jaw	
Similicaudipteryx	2008	Jiufotang Formation (Early Cretaceous, Aptian to Albian)	China	Had a short tail ending with a dagger-shaped pygostyle	
Sinankylosaurus	2020	Wangshi Group (Late Cretaceous, Campanian)	China	Only known from an ilium. Described as an ankylosaur but a recent study doubts this interpretation	
Sinocalliopteryx	2007	Yixian Formation (Early Cretaceous, Barremian to Aptian)	China	Stomach contents indicate a possible preference for volant prey such as dromaeosaurids and early birds	
Sinocephale	2021	Ulansuhai Formation (Late Cretaceous, Santonian to Campanian?)	China	Originally named as a species of Troodon when that genus was thought to be a pachycephalosaur	
Sinoceratops	2010	Wangshi Group (Late Cretaceous, Campanian)	China	Possessed forward-curving hornlets and a series of low knobs on the top of the frill	
Sinocoelurus	1942	Kuangyuan Series (Late Jurassic, Oxfordian to Tithonian?)	China	One study considered it to be a potential plesiosaur	
Sinornithoides	1993	Ejinhoro Formation (Early Cretaceous, Aptian to Albian)	China	Preserved in a roosting position, with its head tucked underneath its left wing	
Sinornithomimus	2003	Ulansuhai Formation (Late Cretaceous, Santonian to Campanian?)	China	Formed age-segregated herds as evidenced by a concentration of juvenile skeletons	
Sinornithosaurus	1999	Yixian Formation (Early Cretaceous, Barremian)	China	One specimen has grooved teeth, suggesting it was venomous	
Sinosauropteryx	1996	Yixian Formation (Early Cretaceous, Aptian)	China	The first non-avian dinosaur found with direct evidence of feathers. Analysis of melanosomes suggests it had a countershading pattern with a striped tail and a "bandit mask" around its eyes	
Sinosaurus	1940	Lufeng Formation (Early Jurassic, Hettangian to Sinemurian)	China	Had a pair of midline crests similar to Dilophosaurus	
Sinotyrannus	2009	Jiufotang Formation (Early Cretaceous, Aptian)	China	Usually seen as a large proceratosaurid, but one study suggests it may represent a fully grown stage of the slightly older Huaxiagnathus	
Sinovenator	2002	Yixian Formation (Early Cretaceous, Barremian)	China	Some specimens are preserved three-dimensionally	
Sinraptor	1994	Shishugou Formation (Late Jurassic, Oxfordian)	China	May have used its teeth like blades to inflict deep wounds in prey	
Sinusonasus	2004	Yixian Formation (Early Cretaceous, Hauterivian)	China	Had distinctive sinusoid nasal bones	
Sirindhorna	2015	Khok Kruat Formation (Early Cretaceous, Aptian)	Thailand	Its fossils were discovered by corn farmers while digging a reservoir	
Sonidosaurus	2006	Iren Dabasu Formation (Late Cretaceous, Turonian to Santonian)	China	One of the smallest known titanosaurs	
Stegosaurides	1953	Xinminbao Group (Early Cretaceous, Hauterivian to Albian)	China	A thyreophoran of uncertain phylogenetic position	
Suzhousaurus	2007	Xinminbao Group (Early Cretaceous, Aptian to Albian)	China	One of the largest Early Cretaceous therizinosaurs	
Szechuanosaurus	1942	Kuangyuan Series (Late Jurassic, Oxfordian to Tithonian?)	China	Only known from teeth and possibly a very fragmentary skeleton	
Talarurus	1952	Bayanshiree Formation (Late Cretaceous, Cenomanian to Santonian)	Mongolia	Its tail club has been compared to a wicker basket	
Tambatitanis	2014	Ohyamashimo Formation (Early Cretaceous, Albian)	Japan	Possessed disproportionately large chevrons	
Tangvayosaurus	1999	Grès supérieurs Formation (Early Cretaceous, Aptian to Albian)	Laos	Closely related to Phuwiangosaurus	
Tanius	1929	Wangshi Group (Late Cretaceous, Campanian to Maastrichtian)	China	Today known from only a few bones. More fossils were once present but were not collected	
Taohelong	2013	Hekou Group (Early Cretaceous, Albian)	China	Possessed a sacral shield similar to that of Polacanthus	
Tarbosaurus	1955	Nemegt Formation, Subashi Formation (Late Cretaceous, Maastrichtian)	China; Mongolia	An apex predator that hunted large prey. Very similar to Tyrannosaurus	
Tarchia	1977	Baruungoyot Formation, Nemegt Formation (Late Cretaceous, Campanian to Maastrichtian)	Mongolia	One specimen preserves injuries on its ribs and tail, possibly from a fight with a member of its own kind	
Tatisaurus	1965	Lufeng Formation (Early Jurassic, Sinemurian)	China	Potentially a basal thyreophoran	
Tengrisaurus	2017	Murtoi Formation (Early Cretaceous, Valanginian to Hauterivian)	Russia	Closely related to South American titanosaurs	
Therizinosaurus	1954	Nemegt Formation (Late Cretaceous, Maastrichtian)	Mongolia	Possessed extremely elongated and stiffened hand claws	
Tianchisaurus	1993	Toutunhe Formation (Late Jurassic, Oxfordian to Kimmeridgian)	China	Its description uses the spellings Tianchisaurus and Tianchiasaurus interchangeably, but the former is correct	
Tianyulong	2009	Tiaojishan Formation (Late Jurassic, Oxfordian)	China	Preserves impressions of long bristles down its back, tail and neck	
Tianyuraptor	2009	Yixian Formation (Early Cretaceous, Barremian to Aptian)	China	Combines features of both northern and southern dromaeosaurids. Had unusual proportions	
Tianzhenosaurus	1998	Huiquanpu Formation (Late Cretaceous, Cenomanian to Campanian)	China	May be synonymous with Saichania but the discovery of the second species, T. chengi, casts doubt on this interpretation	
Tienshanosaurus	1937	Shishugou Formation (Late Jurassic, Oxfordian)	China	Large but basal for a mamenchisaurid	
Timurlengia	2016	Bissekty Formation (Late Cretaceous, Turonian)	Uzbekistan	Its inner ear was specialized for detecting low-frequency sounds	
Tochisaurus	1991	Nemegt Formation (Late Cretaceous, Maastrichtian)	Mongolia	Known from only a single metatarsus	
Tonganosaurus	2010	Yimen Formation (Early Jurassic, Pliensbachian)	China	Potentially the oldest known mamenchisaurid	
Tongnanlong	2025	Suining Formation (Late Jurassic?, Tithonian?)	China	One of the largest mamenchisaurids	
Tongtianlong	2016	Nanxiong Formation (Late Cretaceous, Maastrichtian)	China	The pose of the holotype suggests it died while trying to free itself from mud	
Tsaagan	2006	Djadochta Formation (Late Cretaceous, Campanian)	Mongolia	Very similar to Velociraptor but differs in some features of the skull	
Tsagantegia	1993	Bayanshiree Formation (Late Cretaceous, Cenomanian to Santonian)	Mongolia	Had a long, shovel-shaped snout which may indicate a browsing lifestyle	
Tsintaosaurus	1958	Wangshi Group (Late Cretaceous, Campanian)	China	Originally mistakenly believed to have possessed a unicorn horn-like crest	
Tugulusaurus	1973	Tugulu Group (Early Cretaceous, Barremian to Albian)	China	Potentially an early, Xiyunykus-grade alvarezsaurian	
Tuojiangosaurus	1977	Shaximiao Formation (Late Jurassic, Oxfordian to Kimmeridgian)	China	Possessed two rows of tall, pointed plates, thickened in the center as if they were modified spikes	
Turanoceratops	1989	Bissekty Formation (Late Cretaceous, Turonian)	Uzbekistan	Had a pair of brow horns like ceratopsids but was likely not a member of that family	
Tylocephale	1974	Baruungoyot Formation (Late Cretaceous, Campanian)	Mongolia	Only known from a partial skull but it is enough to tell that it had a remarkably tall dome	
Tyrannomimus	2023	Kitadani Formation (Early Cretaceous, Aptian)	Japan	Its ilium is remarkably similar to that of the supposed tyrannosauroid Aviatyrannis	
Udanoceratops	1992	Djadochta Formation (Late Cretaceous, Campanian)	Mongolia	The largest known leptoceratopsid	
Ultrasaurus	1983	Gugyedong Formation (Early Cretaceous, Aptian to Albian)	South Korea	Described as very large but this may be due to misidentification of a bone	
Ulughbegsaurus	2021	Bissekty Formation, Khodzhakul Formation (Late Cretaceous, Cenomanian to Turonian)	Uzbekistan	A 2022 study suggested this taxon could be a large-bodied dromaeosaurid, although the discovery of a fragmentary right maxilla assigned to the genus suggests it is very likely a member of the family Carcharodontosauridae	
Uragasaurus	2026	Phu Kradung Formation (Late Jurassic, Oxfordian to Tithonian)	Thailand	The first mamenchisaurid formally named from Thailand. Only one dorsal vertebra is known	
Urbacodon	2007	Bissekty Formation, Dzharakuduk Formation, Iren Dabasu Formation (Late Cretaceous, Cenomanian to Turonian)	China; Uzbekistan	The U. itemirensis holotype preserves a gap separating the eight rear teeth from the rest of its teeth	
Vayuraptor	2019	Sao Khua Formation (Early Cretaceous, Barremian)	Thailand	Potentially ancestral to megaraptorans or an early member of the group	
Velociraptor	1924	Bayan Mandahu Formation, Djadochta Formation (Late Cretaceous, Campanian)	China; Mongolia	One potential specimen preserves quill knobs	
Wakinosaurus	1992	Sengoku Formation (Early Cretaceous, Valanginian to Barremian)	Japan	May be a close relative of Acrocanthosaurus	
Wannanosaurus	1977	Xiaoyan Formation (Late Cretaceous, Maastrichtian)	China	Basal for a pachycephalosaur as indicated by its flat skull with large openings	
Wudingloong	2025	Yubacun Formation (Early Jurassic, Hettangian to Sinemurian)	China	The oldest and basalmost sauropodomorph named from eastern Asia	
Wuerhosaurus	1973	Ejinhoro Formation, Tugulu Group (Early Cretaceous, Hauterivian to Barremian)	China	One of the last and largest known stegosaurs. Preserved with low rectangular plates but these may be broken	
Wulagasaurus	2008	Yuliangze Formation (Late Cretaceous, Maastrichtian)	China	A rare hadrosaurid known from far less remains than the contemporary Sahaliyania	
Wulatelong	2013	Bayan Mandahu Formation (Late Cretaceous, Campanian)	China	Known from a partial skeleton including some parts of the skull	
Wulong	2020	Jiufotang Formation (Early Cretaceous, Aptian)	China	Analysis of preserved melanosomes suggests it was mostly gray with iridescent wings	
Xiangyunloong	2026	Fengjiahe Formation (Early Jurassic, Hettangian)	China	One of the largest Early Jurassic Asian sauropodomorphs	
Xianshanosaurus	2009	Haoling Formation (Early Cretaceous, Aptian to Albian)	China	May have been closely related to Daxiatitan	
Xiaosaurus	1983	Shaximiao Formation (Middle Jurassic, Bajocian to Callovian)	China	An ornithischian of uncertain affinities	
Xiaotingia	2011	Tiaojishan Formation (Middle Jurassic to Late Jurassic, Bathonian to Oxfordian)	China	Well-preserved but inconsistent in phylogenetic placement. Some studies suggest a position as an early avialan	
Xingtianosaurus	2019	Yixian Formation (Early Cretaceous, Barremian)	China	Retained the large third finger that was lost in other caudipterids	
Xingxiulong	2017	Lufeng Formation (Early Jurassic, Hettangian)	China	Two species are known, with the recently described X. yueorum being considerably larger than the type species X. chengi	
Xinjiangovenator	2005	Tugulu Group (Early Cretaceous, Valanginian to Albian)	China	Remains originally identified as Phaedrolosaurus	
Xinjiangtitan	2013	Qiketai Formation (Middle Jurassic, Callovian)	China	Had an extremely long neck	
Xiongguanlong	2009	Xinminbao Group, (Early Cretaceous, Aptian)	China	More robust than other early tyrannosauroids, possibly to support its elongated skull	
Xixianykus	2010	Majiacun Formation (Late Cretaceous, Coniacian to Santonian)	China	One of the smallest known non-avian dinosaurs	
Xixiasaurus	2010	Majiacun Formation (Late Cretaceous, Coniacian to Campanian)	China	Distinguished from other troodontids by its possession of exactly twenty-two teeth in each maxilla	
Xixiposaurus	2010	Lufeng Formation (Early Jurassic, Hettangian to Toarcian)	China	Poorly known	
Xiyunykus	2018	Tugulu Group (Early Cretaceous, Barremian to Aptian)	China	Had an unspecialized hand morphology for an alvarezsaur, having three fingers of roughly equal length and construction	
Xuanhanosaurus	1984	Shaximiao Formation (Middle Jurassic, Bathonian)	China	Originally mistakenly believed to have been capable of quadrupedal locomotion	
Xuanhuaceratops	2006	Houcheng Formation (Late Jurassic, Tithonian)	China	Possessed a large premaxillary tooth right behind its beak	
Xunmenglong	2019	Huajiying Formation (Early Cretaceous, Hauterivian)	China	The holotype was originally presented as part of a chimera involving three different animals	
Xuwulong	2011	Xinminbao Group (Early Cretaceous, Aptian to Albian)	China	The tip of its dentary was V-shaped when viewed from the side	
Yamaceratops	2006	Javkhlant Formation (Late Cretaceous, Santonian)	Mongolia	Possessed a short, stubby frill	
Yamatosaurus	2021	Kita-Ama Formation (Late Cretaceous, Maastrichtian)	Japan	Basal yet survived late enough to be contemporaneous with more advanced hadrosaurids	
Yanbeilong	2024	Zuoyun Formation (Early Cretaceous, Albian)	China	One of the youngest known stegosaurs	
Yandusaurus	1979	Shaximiao Formation (Middle Jurassic, Bathonian)	China	Some fossils were destroyed by a composter before they could be studied	
Yangchuanosaurus	1978	Shaximiao Formation (Middle Jurassic to Late Jurassic, Bathonian to Tithonian)	China	The largest theropod known from the Shaximiao Formation	
Yantaloong	2026	Zhanghe Formation (Middle Jurassic, Aalenian to Callovian)	China	Possibly the first turiasaur known from Asia	
Yi	2015	Tiaojishan Formation (Middle Jurassic to Late Jurassic, Callovian to Oxfordian)	China	Possessed a "styliform element" jutting out from its wrist that supported a bat-like membranous wing	
Yimenosaurus	1990	Fengjiahe Formation (Early Jurassic, Pliensbachian)	China	Much of its skeleton is known, including the entirety of the skull	
Yingshanosaurus	1994	Shaximiao Formation (Middle Jurassic, Bathonian)	China	Possessed greatly enlarged shoulder spines	
Yinlong	2006	Shishugou Formation (Late Jurassic, Oxfordian)	China	Its skull displays features of ceratopsians, pachycephalosaurs and heterodontosaurids	
Yixianosaurus	2003	Yixian Formation (Early Cretaceous, Aptian)	China	Inconsistent in phylogenetic placement. Had extremely elongated manual elements	
Yizhousaurus	2018	Lufeng Formation (Early Jurassic, Sinemurian)	China	Its skull was very similar to those of sauropods despite being more primitive	
Yongjinglong	2014	Hekou Group (Early Cretaceous, Albian)	China	Possessed an extremely long, broad scapula	
Yuanmouraptor	2025	Zhanghe Formation (Middle Jurassic, Aalenian to Bajocian)	China	Known from a nearly complete skull	
Yuanmousaurus	2006	Zhanghe Formation (Middle Jurassic, Aalenian to Callovian)	China	Shares features of its vertebrae with Patagosaurus	
Yuanyanglong	2025	Miaogou Formation (Early Cretaceous, Aptian to Albian)	China	The only Early Cretaceous oviraptorosaur known from the Gobi Desert	
Yueosaurus	2012	Liangtoutang Formation (Early Cretaceous to Late Cretaceous, Albian to Cenomanian)	China	Probably closely related to Jeholosaurus	
Yulong	2013	Qiupa Formation (Late Cretaceous, Maastrichtian)	China	Known from multiple specimens, most of which are juveniles	
Yunganglong	2013	Zhumapu Formation (Late Cretaceous, Cenomanian)	China	Discovered 50 kilometres (31 mi) away from a World Heritage Site	
Yunmenglong	2013	Haoling Formation (Early Cretaceous, Barremian to Albian)	China	May have been exceptionally large	
Yunnanosaurus	1942	Fengjiahe Formation, Lufeng Formation (Early Jurassic, Sinemurian to Pliensbachian)	China	Its teeth were self-sharpening similar to those of sauropods, likely through convergent evolution	
Yunyangosaurus	2020	Xintiangou Formation (Middle Jurassic, Aalenian to Callovian)	China	Potentially an early megalosauroid	
Yutyrannus	2012	Yixian Formation (Early Cretaceous, Aptian)	China	The largest known dinosaur to preserve direct evidence of feathers	
Yuxisaurus	2022	Fengjiahe Formation (Early Jurassic, Sinemurian to Toarcian)	China	Had more than one hundred osteoderms	
Yuzhoulong	2022	Shaximiao Formation (Middle Jurassic, Bathonian)	China	One of the oldest known macronarians	
Zanabazar	2009	Nemegt Formation (Late Cretaceous, Maastrichtian)	Mongolia	Originally named as a species of Saurornithoides. Relatively large for a troodontid	
Zaraapelta	2014	Baruungoyot Formation (Late Cretaceous, Campanian)	Mongolia	Had an intricate pattern of osteoderms on its skull	
Zavacephale	2025	Khuren Dukh Formation (Early Cretaceous, Aptian to Albian)	Mongolia	The earliest known and most complete pachycephalosaur	
Zhanghenglong	2014	Majiacun Formation (Late Cretaceous, Santonian)	China	Reconstructed by its describers with a straight, rectangular back, although no complete neural spines are known	
Zhejiangosaurus	2007	Chaochuan Formation (Late Cretaceous, Cenomanian)	China	Has no diagnostic features	
Zhenyuanlong	2015	Yixian Formation (Early Cretaceous, Aptian)	China	Possessed large wings with long feathers, but was most likely flightless	
Zhongjianosaurus	2017	Yixian Formation (Early Cretaceous, Barremian to Aptian)	China	Distinguishable by its characteristically elongated legs. Described as a microraptorian but it has been noted that some features of its skeleton are similar to avialans	
Zhuchengceratops	2010	Wangshi Group (Late Cretaceous, Campanian)	China	Had a particularly deep mandible	
Zhuchengtitan	2017	Wangshi Group (Late Cretaceous, Campanian)	China	The proportions of its humerus suggest a close relationship with Opisthocoelicaudia	
Zhuchengtyrannus	2011	Wangshi Group (Late Cretaceous, Campanian)	China	Closely related to Tarbosaurus and Tyrannosaurus	
Zigongosaurus	1976	Shaximiao Formation (Middle Jurassic to Late Jurassic, Bathonian to Tithonian)	China	May be a species of Mamenchisaurus	
Zizhongosaurus	1983	Ziliujing Formation (Early Jurassic, Toarcian)	China	Poorly known but was most likely basal for a sauropod	
Zuolong	2010	Shishugou Formation (Late Jurassic, Oxfordian)	China	Known from both cranial and postcranial remains	
Zuoyunlong	2017	Zhumapu Formation (Late Cretaceous, Cenomanian)	China	May have been close to the separation between North American and Asian hadrosauroids	

=== Invalid and potentially valid genera ===
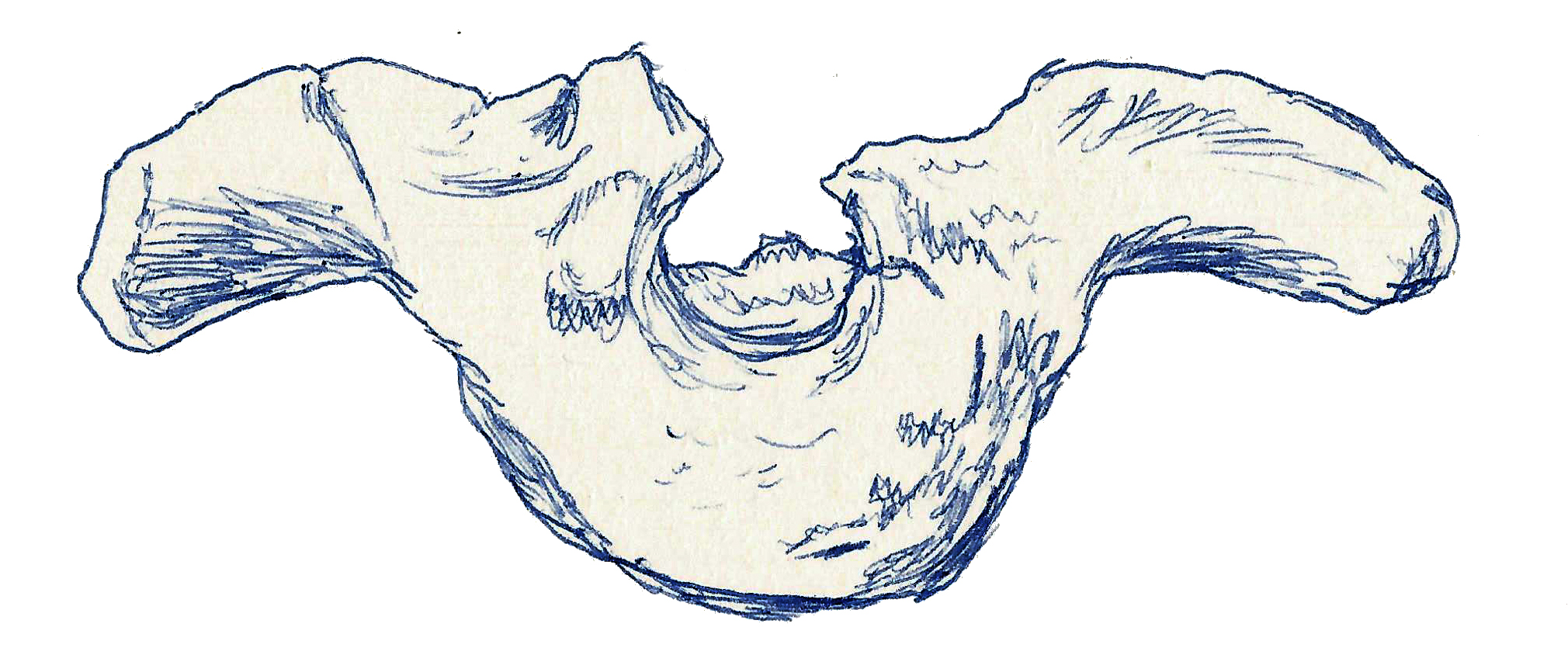
Amtosaurus

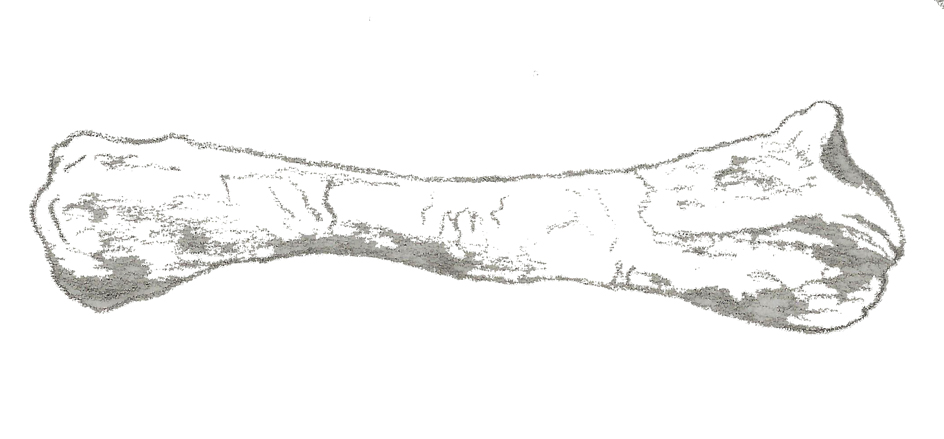
Chienkosaurus

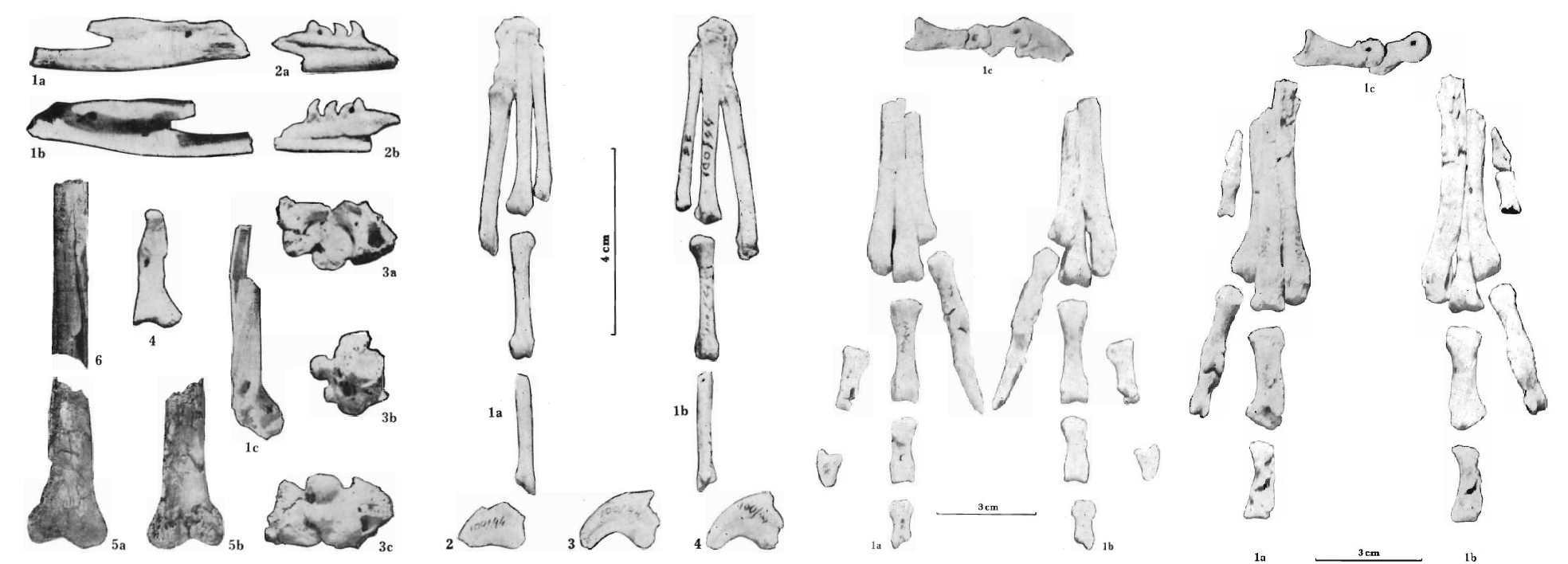
EK troodontid

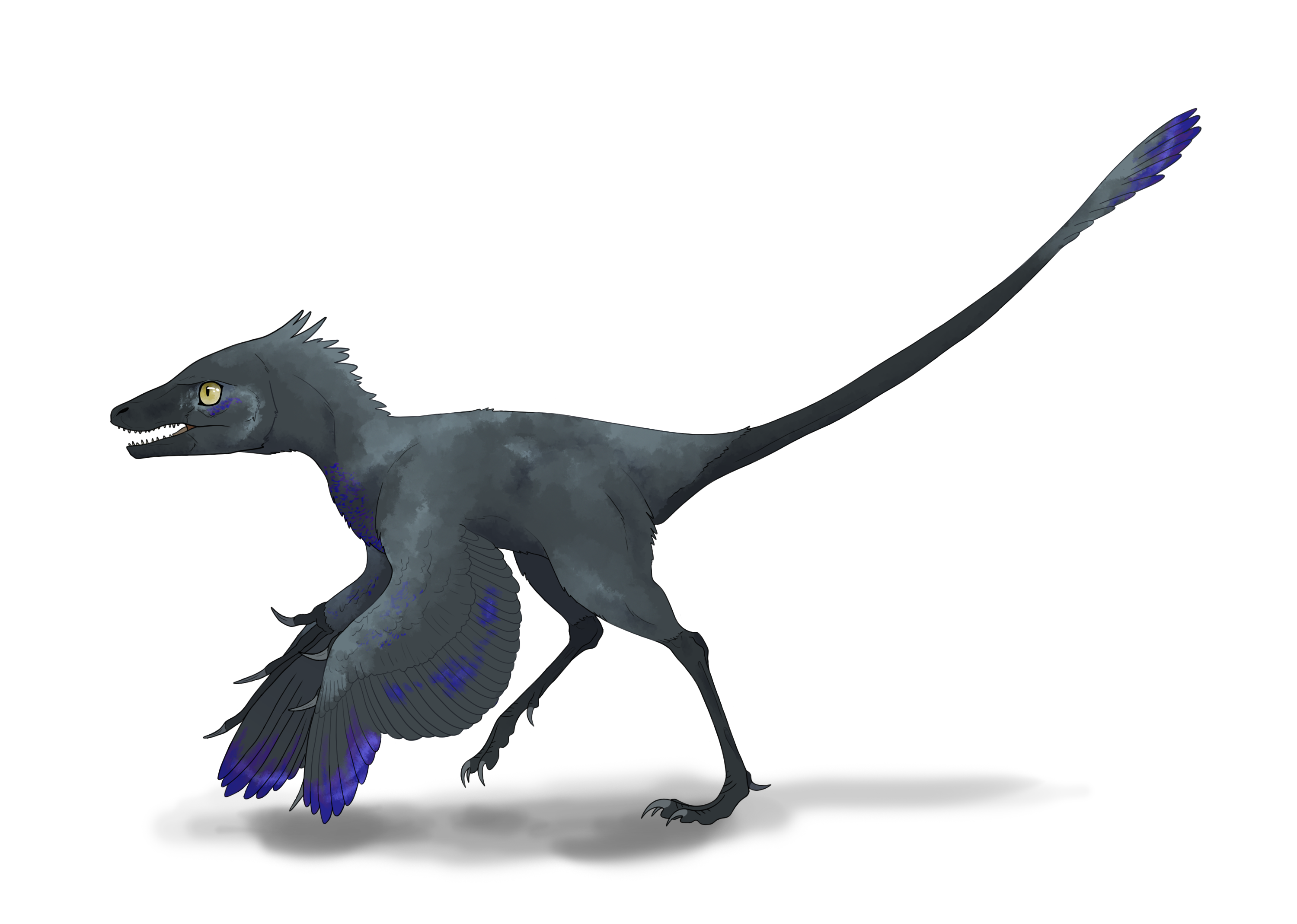
Epidendrosaurus

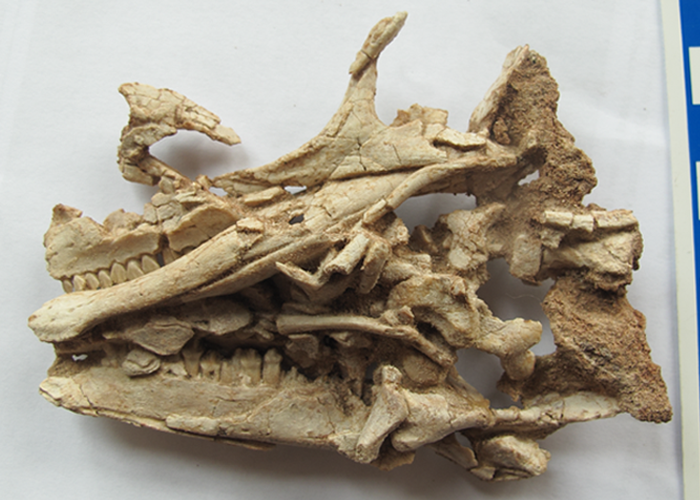
"Eugongbusaurus"

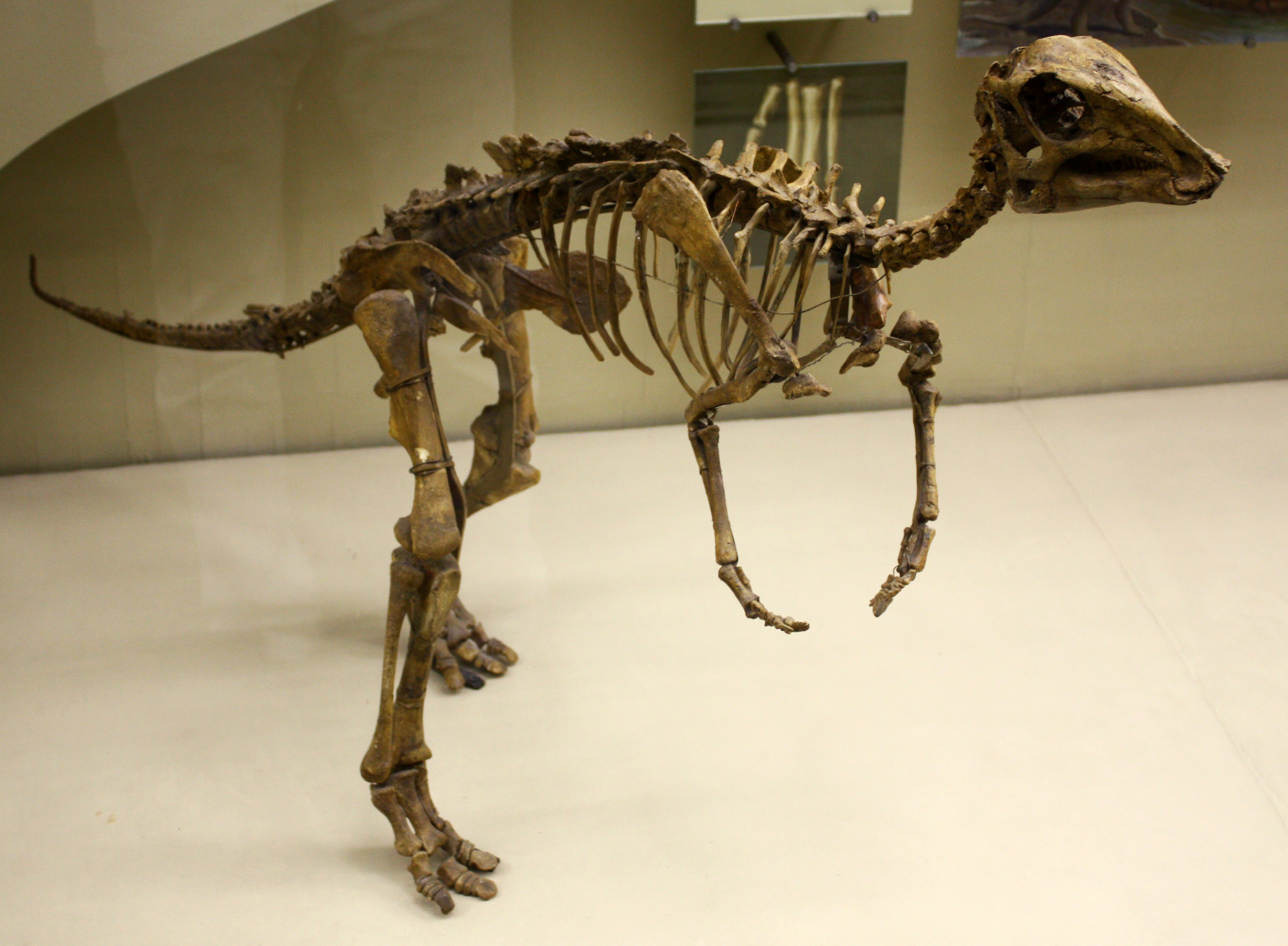
"Gadolosaurus"

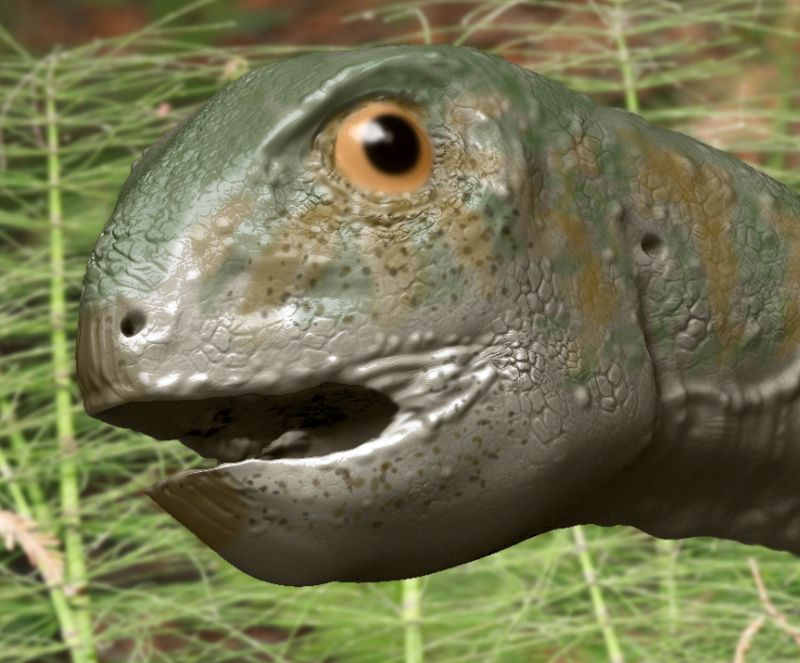
Gobiceratops

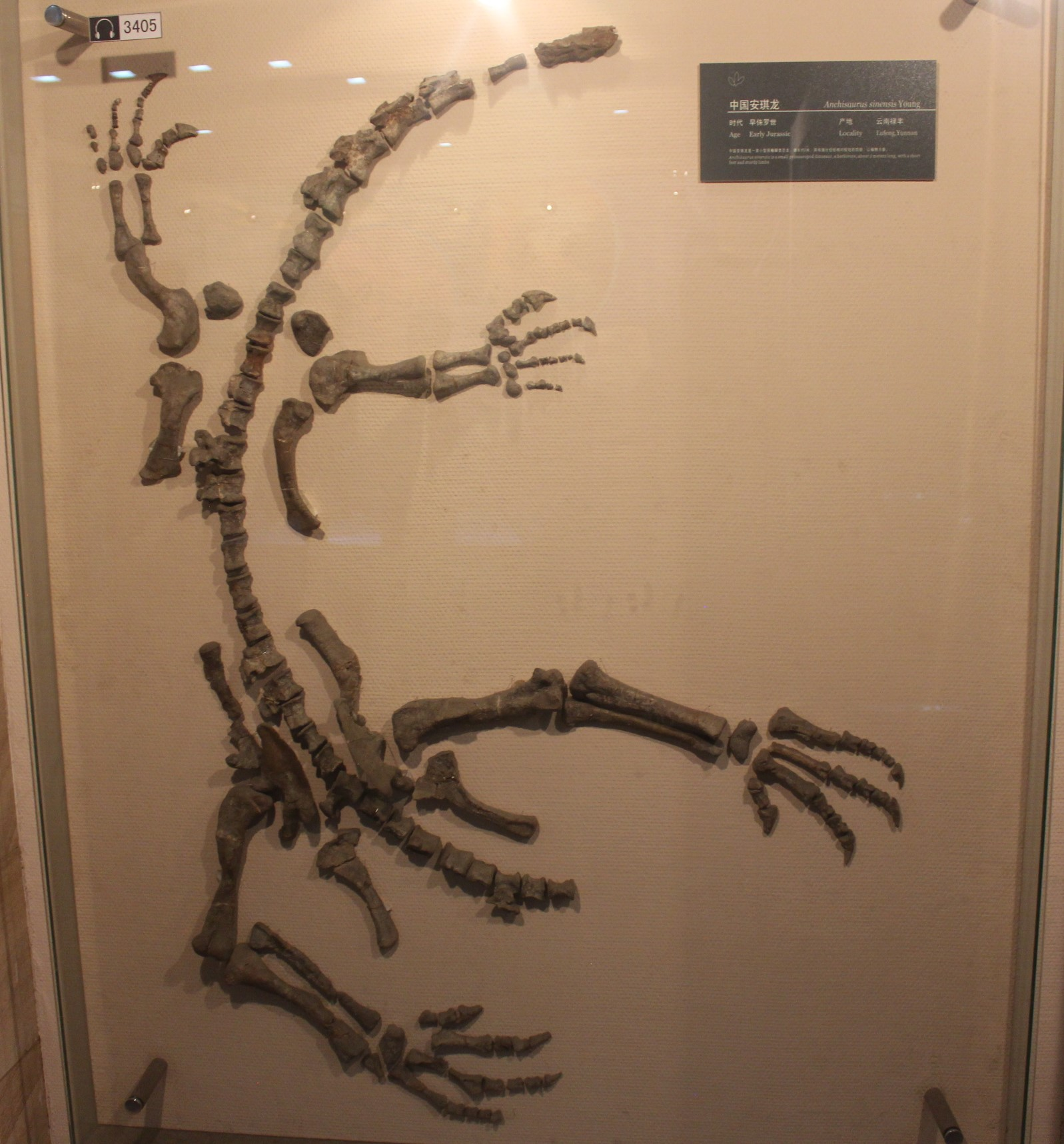
Gyposaurus

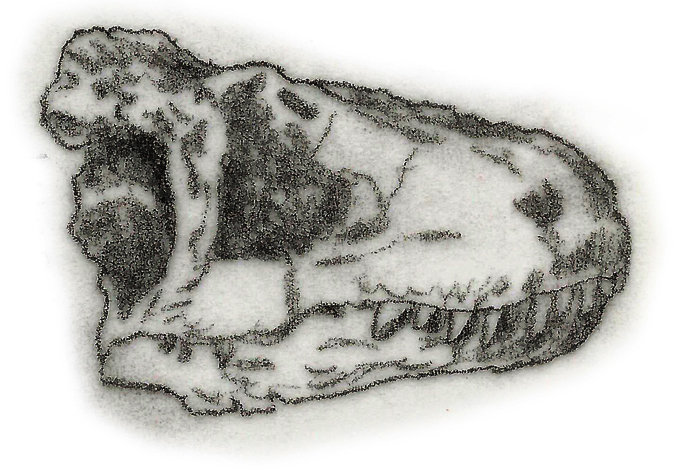
Lukousaurus

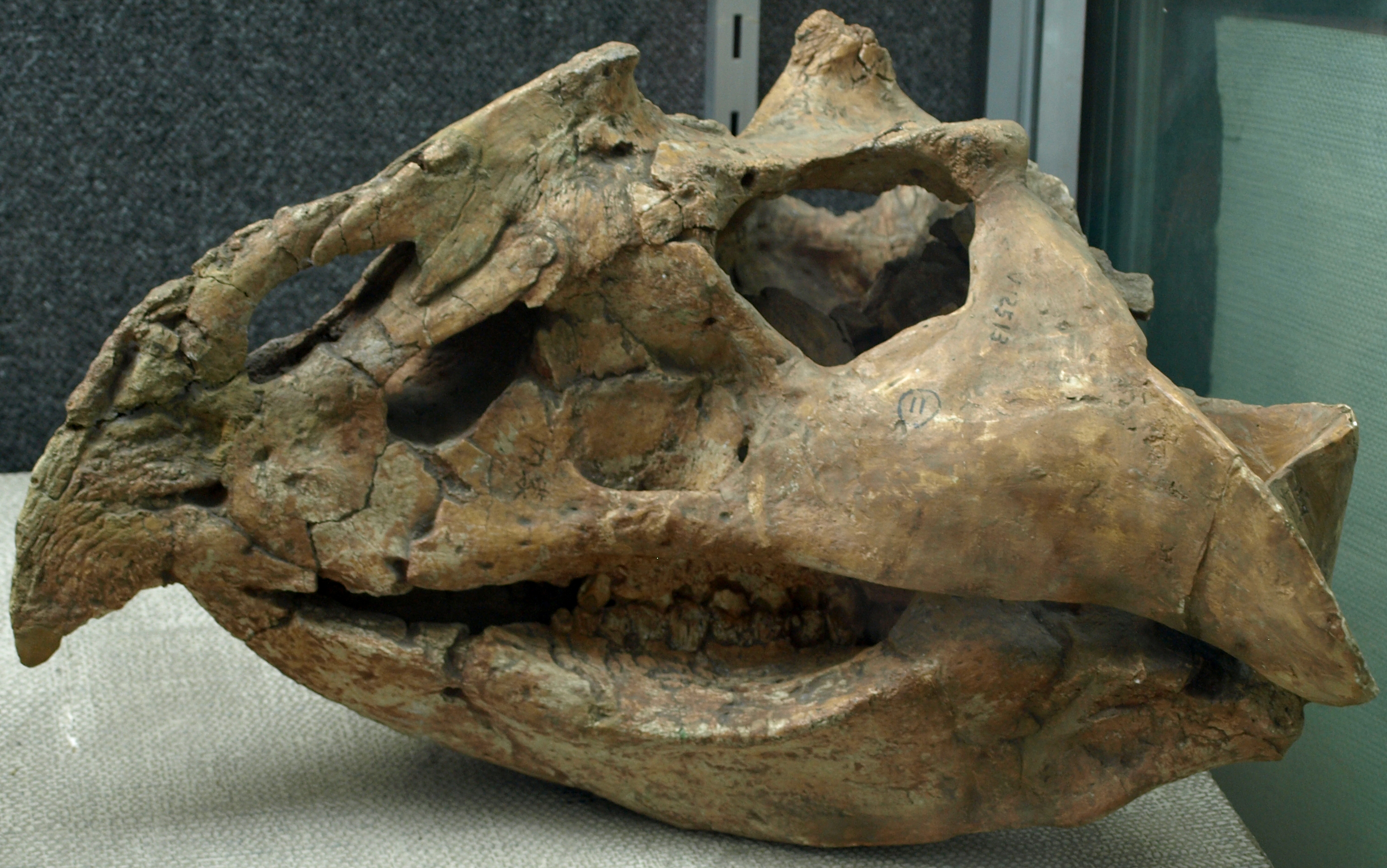
Magnirostris

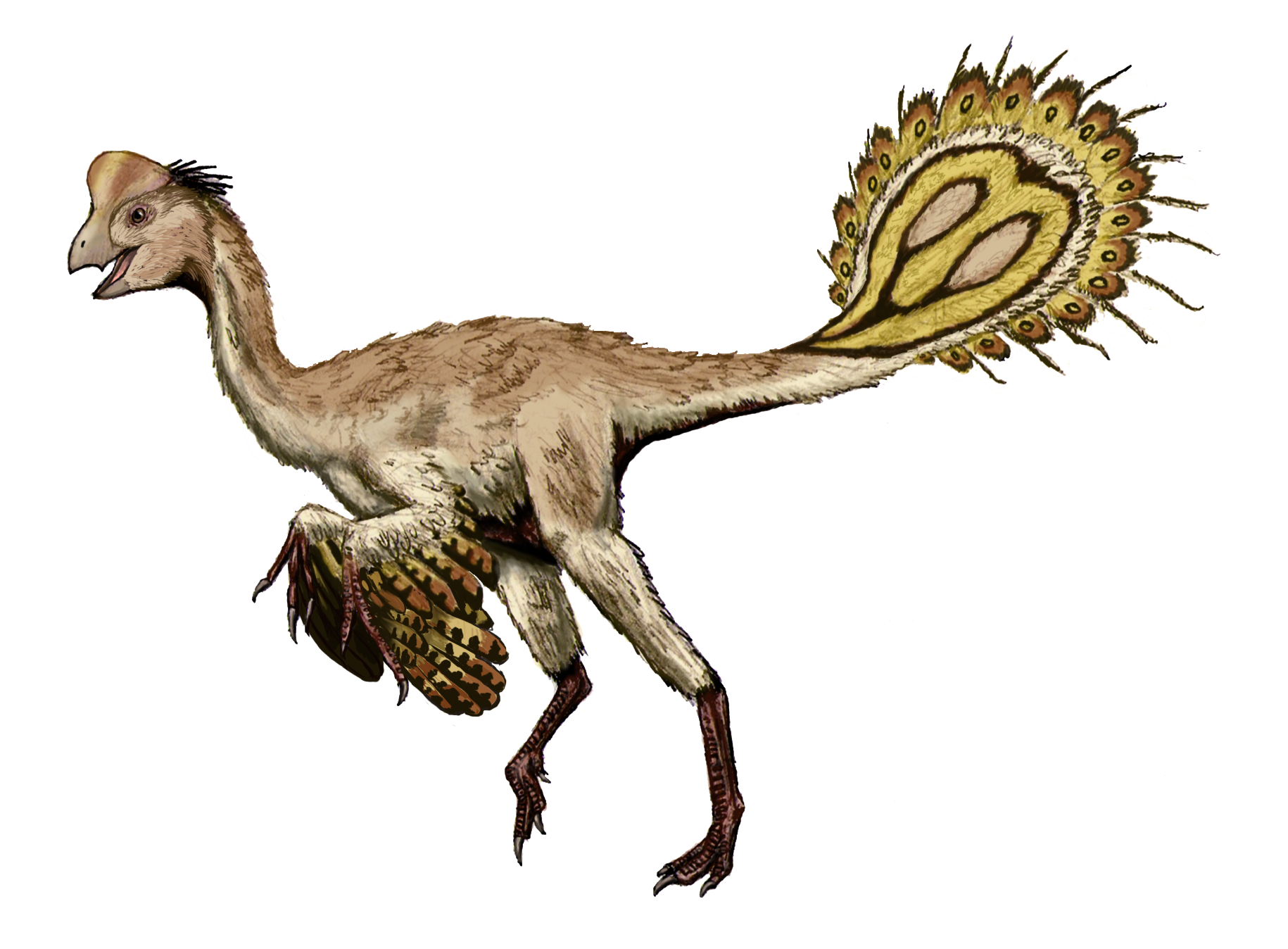
Nomingia

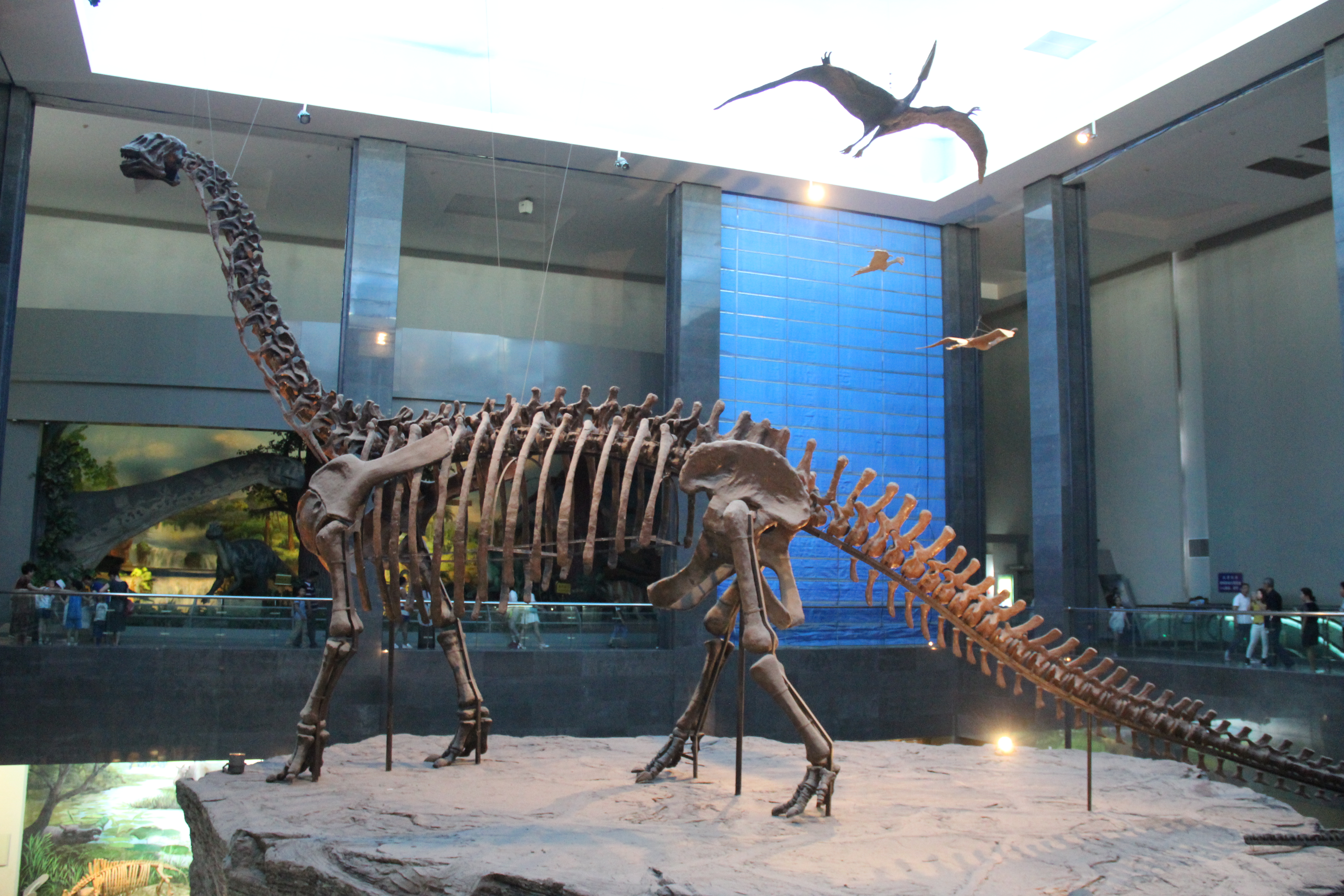
"Nurosaurus"

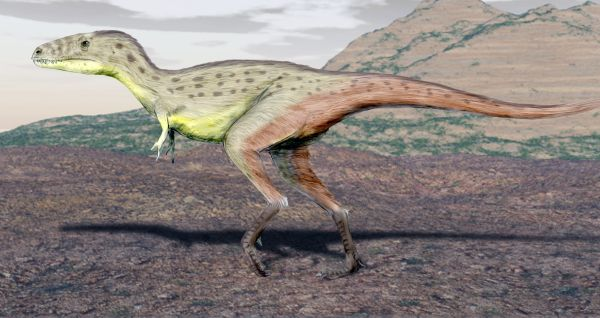
Raptorex

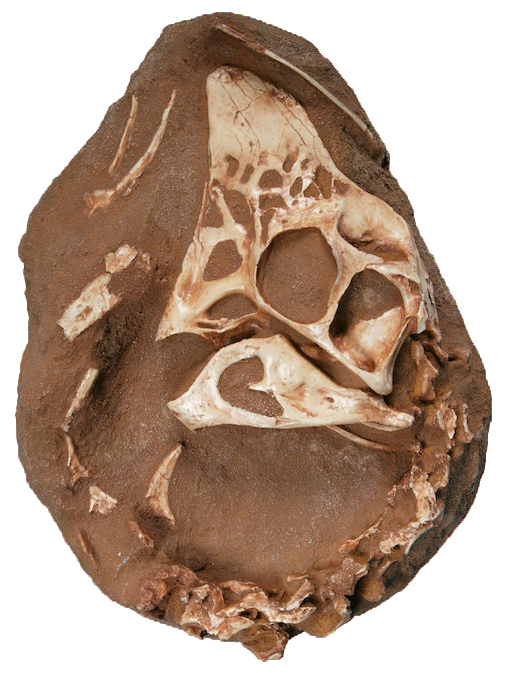
"Ronaldoraptor"

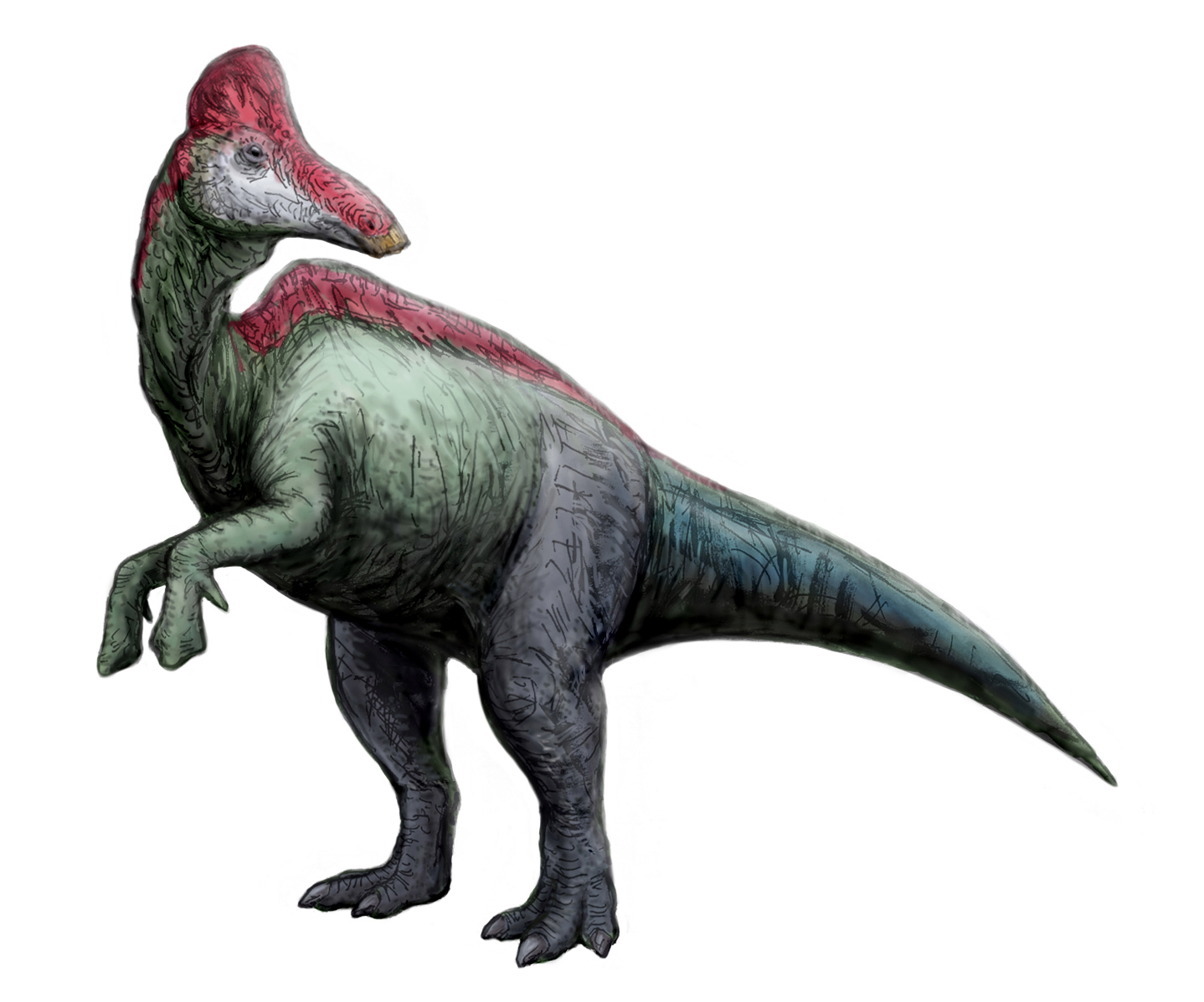
Sahaliyania

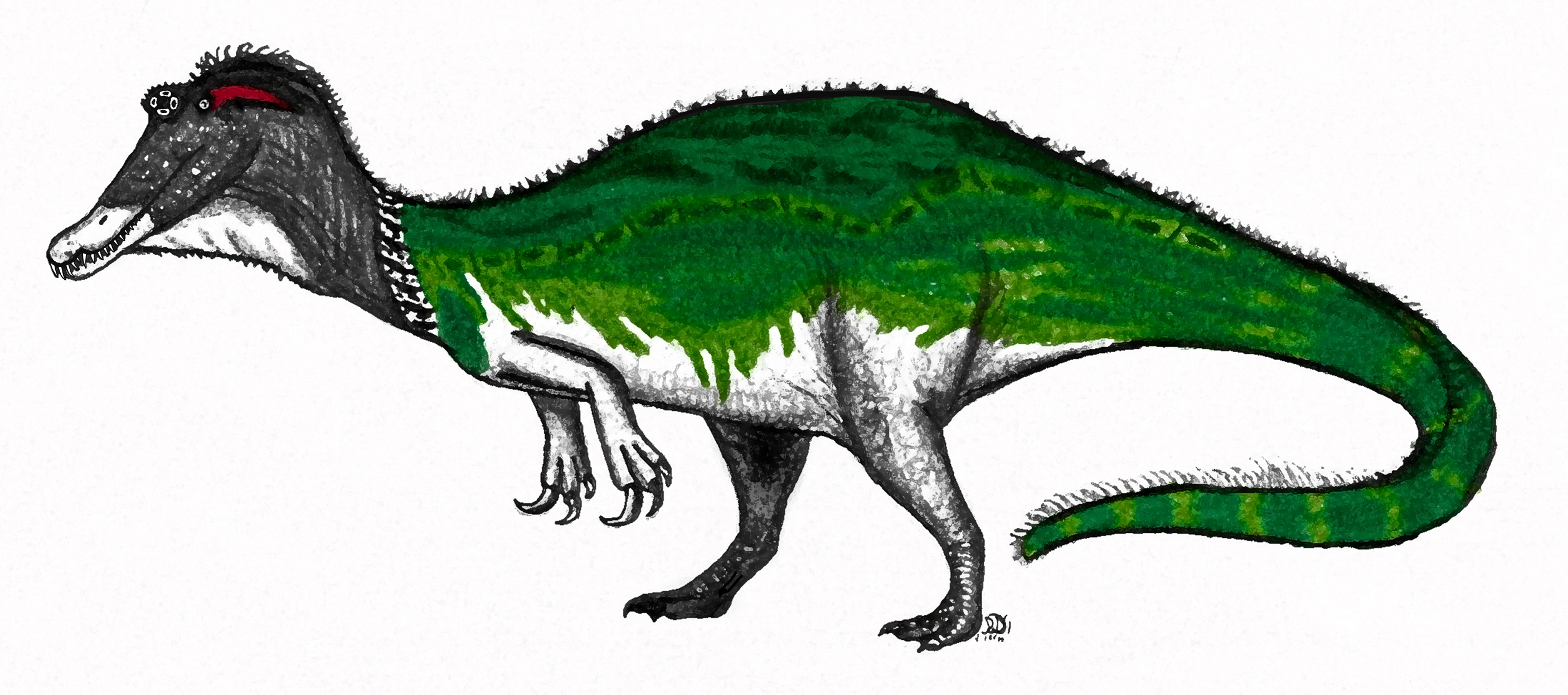
"Sinopliosaurus" fusuiensis

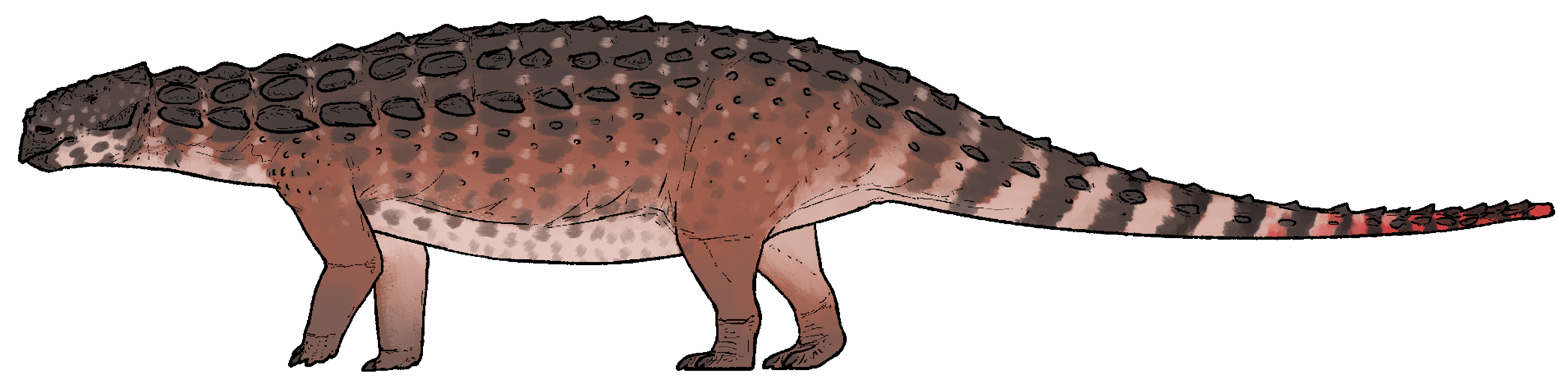
Zhongyuansaurus
- Amtosaurus magnus: An indeterminate ornithischian that may be either a hadrosaurid or an ankylosaurid.
- Antarctosaurus: A. jaxarticus from Kazakhstan has been referred to this genus, but such an assignment is probably incorrect.
- Asiamericana asiatica: Known only from teeth. It has been suggested to be a fish, a spinosaurid, or a species of Richardoestesia.
- "Bakesaurus": Often included in lists of dinosaurs as a nomen nudum, but may simply be a junior synonym or misspelling of Bactrosaurus
- "Balochisaurus malkani": A supposed saltasaurid titanosaur from Pakistan. A paper published in 2021 could make this, as well as other informal Pakistani dinosaurs, valid.
- Beipiaognathus jii: Described based on a chimeric holotype including compsognathid elements.
- "Changdusaurus laminoplacodus": A potential stegosaur. Its remains are now thought to be lost.
- Chienkosaurus ceratosauroides: A possible junior synonym of Szechuanosaurus.
- "Dachongosaurus yunnanensis": Reportedly a Cetiosaurus-like sauropod.
- "Damalasaurus". An indeterminate sauropod. Two species have been named, albeit informally.
- "EK troodontid": The informal name for specimen SPS 100/44, a troodontid discovered in Early Cretaceous sediments from Mongolia.
- Epidendrosaurus ninchengensis: Generally agreed to be the same taxon as Scansoriopteryx. There is debate as to which name has priority. Different researchers use either name to refer to the same animal.
- "Eugongbusaurus" wucaiwanensis: Coined for a referred species of Gongbusaurus. This name is said to have been leaked accidentally.
- "Futabasaurus": A supposed tyrannosaur from Japan. If formally described, it would require a new name as Futabasaurus has already been used for a plesiosaur.
- "Gadolosaurus": The name is an incorrect romanization of the Russian word gadrosavr, meaning hadrosaur, and was not meant to be a new generic name. It may have been a synonym of Arstanosaurus.
- Gobiceratops minutus: May be a growth stage of Bagaceratops.
- "Gspsaurus pakistani": One of several informally-named titanosaurs from Pakistan.
- Gyposaurus: The type species was found in South Africa and may be a synonym of Massospondylus. The Asian species may be identical to Lufengosaurus.
- "Hanwulosaurus": Possibly the most complete ankylosaur known from Asia. Said to belong to its own subgroup within the Ankylosauria.
- "Heilongjiangosaurus jiayinensis": May be a synonym of Charonosaurus and/or "Mandschurosaurus" jiayinensis.
- "Khetranisaurus barkhani": Also spelled "Khateranisaurus". Both spellings remain informal.
- "Koreanosaurus": No relationship to the formally-named ornithischian of the same name (see above). Later renamed "Deinonychus" "koreanensis", but this generic assignment is likely incorrect.
- "Kunmingosaurus wudingensis": Although sometimes presented as a valid taxon, it is in fact a nomen nudum.
- Lamaceratops tereschenkoi: May be a junior synonym of Bagaceratops.
- "Lancanjiangosaurus cachuensis": An informally-named sauropod. Has also been spelled "Lancangosaurus".
- Lukousaurus yini: Sometimes thought to be either a theropod or a pseudosuchian.
- Magnirostris dodsoni: Supposedly distinguishable from other basal ceratopsians by its incipient horn cores, but it may actually be a Bagaceratops with a preservation artifact.
- "Marisaurus jeffi": Potentially closely related to "Balochisaurus" and "Sulaimanisaurus".
- "Megacervixosaurus tibetensis": A sauropod. Its classification is uncertain, but it may be a titanosaur.
- "Microdontosaurus dayensis": May have been formally described as a different genus, but this cannot be proven.
- "Ngexisaurus dapukaensis": Sometimes known as Megalosaurus "dapukaensis", but it is unlikely to belong to this genus.
- Nomingia gobiensis: Notable as one of the first non-avian dinosaurs found with a pygostyle. It may, however, be a synonym of Elmisaurus.
- "Nurosaurus qaganensis": Noteworthy for preserving the first stress fracture found on a sauropod foot. Presented as "soon to be described" in 1992 but remains a nomen nudum to this day.
- "Oshanosaurus youngi": An early sauropod. Has been confused with heterodontosaurids and Eshanosaurus.
- "Otogosaurus sarulai". Very little is known about it. Although it often appears on lists of dinosaurs as a valid taxon, there is no proof it was ever validly named.
- "Pakisaurus balochistani": A titanosaur. It has been referred to the similarly informal titanosaurian family "Pakisauridae".
- Platyceratops tatarinovi: May be a junior synonym of Bagaceratops.
- Raptorex kriegsteini: Described as a small adult tyrannosaur from the Early Cretaceous of China. However, restudy of the sediments it was buried in suggested it was from the Late Cretaceous of Mongolia, and thus more likely a juvenile Tarbosaurus.
- "Ronaldoraptor": An oviraptorosaur with a tall, rectangular crest. Named in a book described as a field guide for time travelers.
- "Sanchusaurus": Said to be potentially synonymous with Gallimimus.
- Sahaliyania elunchunorum: Possibly a synonym of Amurosaurus.
- "Sangonghesaurus": Possibly a synonym of Tianchisaurus if it is not a basal ornithischian.
- Shuangbaisaurus anlongbaoensis: May be an individual variation of Sinosaurus.
- "Sinopliosaurus" fusuiensis: Originally thought to be a plesiosaur but is actually a spinosaurid. It may be synonymous with Siamosaurus.
- "Sugiyamasaurus": Known only from teeth that may belong to Fukuititan.
- "Sulaimanisaurus gingerichi": An informally-named Pakistani titanosaur.
- "Szechuanoraptor dongi": Coined for a referred specimen of Szechuanosaurus. It may belong to Yangchuanosaurus zigongensis.
- "Tonouchisaurus mongoliensis": A theropod reported to have a completely didactyl manus.
- "Vitakridrinda sulaimani": Supposedly an abelisaurid. It is sometimes treated as valid in mainstream literature, such as in a book by Thomas Holtz.
- "Vitakrisaurus saraiki": A noasaurid from the same layers as "Vitakridrinda".
- "Yibinosaurus zhoui": May in fact be a second species of Gongxianosaurus.
- "Yunxianosaurus hubeinensis": Mentioned in a scientific paper as a temporary placeholder name. Further work is needed to determine whether it deserves a formal name.
- Zhongornis haoae: Known from a juvenile skeleton. It is usually thought to be a basal avialan but one hypothesis is that it is a non-avian scansoriopterygid.
- Zhongyuansaurus: Potentially a synonym of Gobisaurus, although the describers of the second species, Z. junchangi, noted various features that could distinguish it from the former taxon.

== Timeline ==
This is a timeline of selected dinosaurs from the list above. Time is measured in Ma, megaannum, along the x-axis.

== See also ==
- List of Asian birds
