= 1942 in paleontology =

List of years in paleontology	(table)
- … 1932; 1933; 1934; 1935; 1936; 1937; 1938; 1939; 1940; 1941; 1942; 1943; 1944; 1945; 1946; 1947; 1948; 1949; 1950; 1951; 1952 …
- In science 1939 1940 1941 1942 1943 1944 1945
- Art; Archaeology; Architecture; Literature; Music; Philosophy; Science; +...

Paleontology or palaeontology is the study of prehistoric life forms on Earth through the examination of plant and animal fossils. This includes the study of body fossils, tracks (ichnites), burrows, cast-off parts, fossilised feces (coprolites), palynomorphs and chemical residues. Because humans have encountered fossils for millennia, paleontology has a long history both before and after becoming formalized as a science. This article records significant discoveries and events related to paleontology that occurred or were published in the year 1942.

== Conodonts ==
Name	Status	Authors	Location	Images
Lochriea	valid	Harold W. Scott	China; Russia; Spain; UK; USA (Alabama and Utah)	

== Dinosaurs ==
=== New taxa ===
Taxon	Novelty	Status	Author(s)	Age	Unit	Location	Notes	Images
Anatosaurus	Gen. nov.	Jr. synonym	Lull & Wright	Maastrichtian	Frenchman Formation, Hell Creek Formation, Horseshoe Canyon Formation, Lance Formation	Alberta, Montana, Saskatchewan, Wyoming	A new genus for Claosaurus annectens and other species	
Chienkosaurus	Gen. et sp. nov.	Nomen dubium	Yang	Tithonian	Kuangyuan Series	China	A dubious theropod	
Kritosaurus breviceps	Comb. nov.	Nomen dubium	Lull & Wright	Campanian	Judith River Formation	Montana	A new combination for Hadrosaurus breviceps	
Procheneosaurus altidens	Comb. nov.	Nomen dubium	Lull & Wright	Campanian	Dinosaur Park Formation	Alberta	A new combination for Trachodon altidens	
Procheneosaurus cranibrevis	Comb. nov.	Jr. synonym	Lull & Wright	Campanian	Dinosaur Park Formation	Alberta	A new combination for Tetragonosaurus cranibrevis, now a juvenile Lambeosaurus	
Procheneosaurus praeceps	Comb. nov.	Jr. synonym	Lull & Wright	Campanian	Dinosaur Park Formation	Alberta	A new combination for Tetragonosaurus praeceps, now a juvenile of Lambeosaurus	
Procheneosaurus erectofrons	Comb. nov.	Jr. synonym	Lull & Wright	Campanian	Dinosaur Park Formation	Alberta	A new combination for Tetragonosaurus erectofrons, now a juvenile Corythosaurus	
Sinocoelurus	Gen. et sp. nov.	Nomen dubium	Yang	Tithonian	Kuangyuan Series	China	A dubious theropod	
Spondylosoma	Gen. et sp. nov.	Valid	Huene	Ladinian	Santa Maria Formation	Brazil	An aphanosaur	
Szechuanosaurus	Gen. et sp. nov.	Nomen dubium	Yang	Tithonian	Kuangyuan Series	China	A dubious theropod	
Yunnanosaurus	Gen. et sp. nov.	Valid	Yang	Sinemurian	Lufeng Formation	China	A prosauropod	

== Synapsids ==
=== Non-mammalian ===
Name	Status	Authors	Age	Location	Notes	Images
Rubidgina	Valid	Broom				
