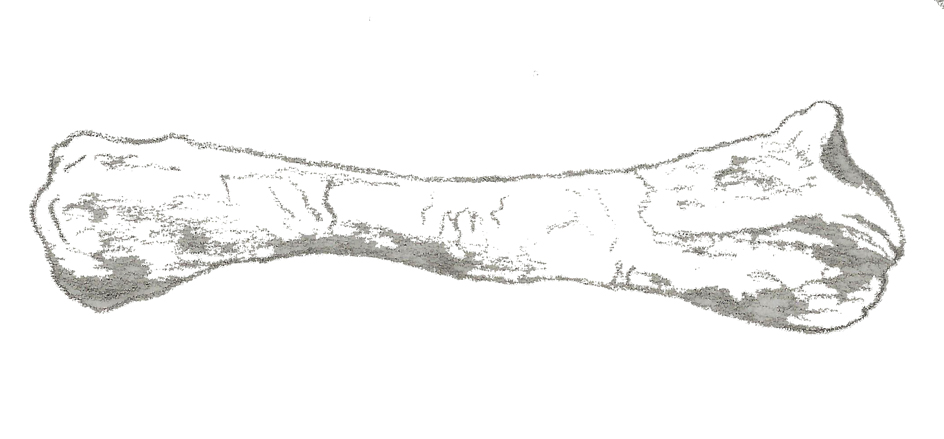
- Ulna referred to Chienkosaurus

Scientific classification
- Domain: Eukaryota
- Kingdom: Animalia
- Phylum: Chordata
- Clade: Dinosauria
- Clade: Saurischia
- Clade: Theropoda
- Genus: †Chienkosaurus
- Species: †C. ceratosauroides

Binomial name
- †Chienkosaurus ceratosauroides Young, 1942

= Chienkosaurus =

Chienkosaurus Temporal range: Late Jurassic, 160–145 Ma Oxfordian-?Tithonian

Extinct genus of dinosaurs

Chienkosaurus ("lizard of Jiange County") is a dubious genus of carnivorous theropod dinosaur from the Late Jurassic Kuangyuan Series of China. It was probably related to Szechuanosaurus.

== Discovery and naming ==
The type species is Chienkosaurus ceratosauroides, named by Yang Zhongjian ("Chung Chien Young") in 1942 on the basis of IVPP V.237, which consists of four teeth. The species name means "Ceratosaurus-like" because Yang interpreted the teeth as being similar to Ceratosaurus. Three of the teeth catalogued under IVPP V.237 were recognized by Dong et al. (1983) as non-theropod and instead belonging to the mesoeucrocodylian Hsisosuchus, effectively restricting the holotype to the theropod tooth. Yang also referred to Chienkosaurus an ulna (IVPP V.193) and a caudal centrum (IVPP V.192). Holtz et al. (2004) designated Chienkosaurus as dubious in their chapter on basal Tetanurae, as did Wu et al. (2009).
