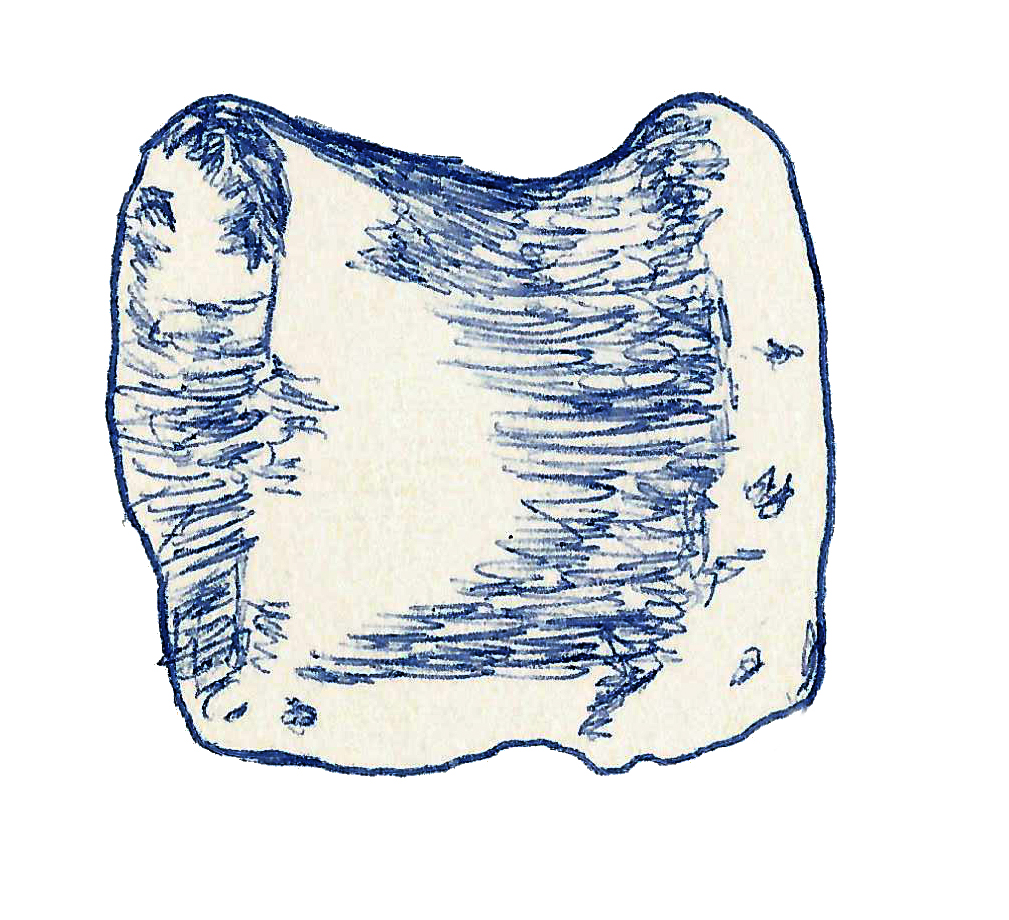
- Vertebra

Scientific classification
- Kingdom: Animalia
- Phylum: Chordata
- Class: Reptilia
- Clade: Dinosauria
- Clade: Saurischia
- Clade: Theropoda
- Genus: †Embasaurus; Riabinin, 1931
- Species: †E. minax

Binomial name
- †Embasaurus minax Riabinin, 1931

Synonyms
- Embasasaurus Carroll, 1987 (lapsus calami)

= Embasaurus =

Embasaurus Temporal range: Early Cretaceous, Berriasian

Extinct genus of dinosaurs

Embasaurus (meaning "Emba lizard") is a dubious genus of tetanuran theropod dinosaur from the Early Cretaceous period. It is known from two vertebrae found in the Neocomian Sands of Kazakhstan. As it is known only from fragmentary remains, Embasaurus is considered by some to be a possible nomen dubium. It was named after the Emba River, and it is believed to have lived during the Berriasian stage, around 140 million years ago. According to the Theropod Database, a personal website designed by Mickey Mortimer, further research may suggest that Embasaurus may be a basal tyrannosauroid. George Olshevsky, however, considered Embasaurus to be a megalosaurid, closely related to Magnosaurus, Megalosaurus, and Torvosaurus.

The type species, Embasaurus minax, was described by the Soviet paleontologist Anatoly Riabinin in 1931.
