= Neocomian Sands (Kazakhstan) =

Geologic formation in Kazakhstan

- Stratigraphic range: Berriasian-Hauterivian; ~145–130 Ma
- Type: Geological formation

Lithology
- Primary: Sandstone

Location
- Coordinates: 47.1°N 51.9°E
- Approximate paleocoordinates: 41.8°N 55.1°E
- Region: Atyrau
- Country: Kazakhstan

Type section
- Named for: Neocomian (Early Cretaceous)
- Neocomian Sands (Kazakhstan) (Kazakhstan)

The Neocomian Sands is an Early Cretaceous geologic formation in Atyrau, Kazakhstan. Dinosaur remains have been recovered from the formation.

== Fossil content ==
- Embasaurus minax - "Vertebrae."

== See also ==
- List of dinosaur-bearing rock formations
  - List of stratigraphic units with few dinosaur genera
