= Kuangyuan Series =

Geologic formation in Sichuan (Szechuan), China

- Stratigraphic range: Late Jurassic, 160–145 Ma Oxfordian-?Tithonian
- Type: Geological formation

Location
- Region: Guangyuan, Sichuan
- Country: China

The Kuangyuan Series is a Late Jurassic (Oxfordian-?Tithonian) geologic formation in Sichuan (Szechuan), China. Dinosaur remains are among the fossils that have been recovered from the formation.

== Paleofauna ==
- Chienkosaurus ceratosauroides - "Isolated teeth."
- Sanpasaurus yaoi - "Fragmentary postcranium."
- ?Szechuanosaurus campi - "Teeth from multiple specimens"
- Sinocoelurus fragilis - "Isolated teeth."

== See also ==
- List of dinosaur-bearing rock formations
  - List of stratigraphic units with indeterminate dinosaur fossils
