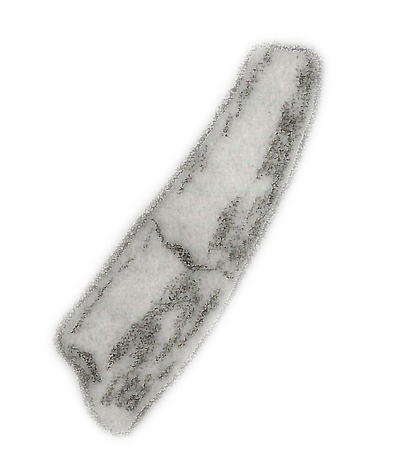
- Tooth

Scientific classification
- Kingdom: Animalia
- Phylum: Chordata
- Class: Reptilia
- Clade: Dinosauria
- Clade: Saurischia
- Clade: Theropoda
- Genus: †Sinocoelurus; Yang, 1942
- Species: †S. fragilis

Binomial name
- †Sinocoelurus fragilis Yang, 1942

= Sinocoelurus =

Sinocoelurus Temporal range: Upper Jurassic, 160 Ma

Extinct genus of reptiles

Sinocoelurus (meaning "Chinese hollow tail", in reference to location and to relate the new genus to the North American Coelurus) is a genus of theropod dinosaur from the Oxfordian-?Tithonian-age Upper Jurassic Kyangyan Series of Sichuan, China. It is an obscure tooth taxon.

== History ==
In 1942, the Chinese paleontologist Yang Zhongjian (in older references his name is given as C. C. Young) named this genus from IVP AS V232-234, a group of four isolated partial teeth found near Weiyuan, Guangyuan, Sichuan Basin. He described them as "long, slender, moderately curved and compressed; ridged anterior and posterior sides with no trace of serrations; enamel very thin". He considered the genus to be "coelurosaurian", which at that time meant a small theropod. The most distinctive characteristic of these teeth was their lack of serrations.

Because of the small amount of material, Sinocoelurus has attracted little attention since its description, outside of reviews. It is usually considered a nomen dubium of either coelurosaurian\coelurid affinities (if the source predates the acceptance of Coelurosauria as a wastebasket taxon as traditionally used), or uncertain theropod affinities (if published after this). The most recent review classifies it as Tetanurae incertae sedis and dubious, while Wu et al. (2009) presume it belongs to a plesiosaur; either way, Sinocoelurus was a reptile.

== Paleobiology ==
As a small theropod, Sinocoelurus would have been an agile, bipedal carnivore.
