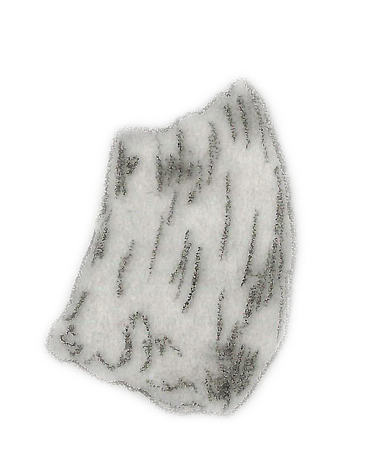
- Illustration of a partial tooth

Scientific classification
- Domain: Eukaryota
- Kingdom: Animalia
- Phylum: Chordata
- Clade: Dinosauria
- Clade: Saurischia
- Clade: Theropoda
- Clade: Neotheropoda
- Genus: †Szechuanosaurus; Young, 1942

Type species
- †Szechuanosaurus campi Young, 1942

= Szechuanosaurus =

Szechuanosaurus Temporal range: Late Jurassic, 160 Ma

Extinct genus of dinosaurs

Szechuanosaurus ("Szechuan lizard") is an extinct genus of carnivorous theropod dinosaur from the Late Jurassic. Fossils referred to the genus have been found in China, Asia in the Oxfordian-?Tithonian (Peng et al., 2005). Its type species is based on several undiagnostic teeth from the Kuangyuan Series. Additional possible specimens of Szechuanosaurus were also reported from the Kalaza Formation, also located in China.

Szechuanosaurus is at times regarded as a nomen dubium due to the lack of diagnostic features in the fossilized teeth upon which the genus is based. Although the fossils are too fragmentary for confident identification, Szechuanosaurus is often interpreted as a medium-sized allosaurid or perhaps a metriacanthosaurid, capable of reaching lengths of around 7.3 meters.

== Discovery and species ==
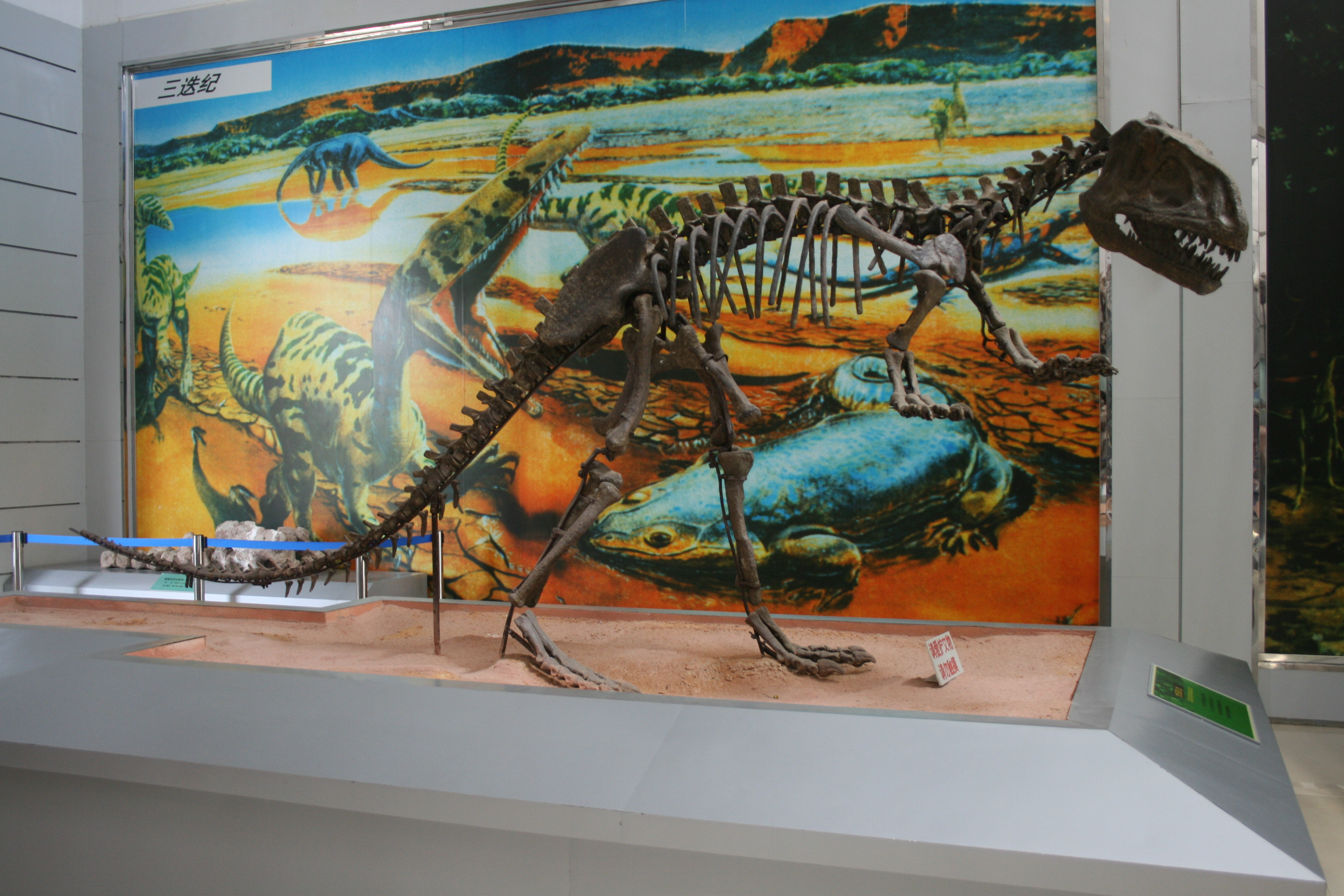
Speculatively reconstructed skeleton at the Kunming Museum

Three species have been assigned to this genus over the years. The type species is Szechuanosaurus campi, named by Yang Zhongjian ("Chung Chien Young") in 1942 for four isolated tooth specimens: IVPP V235, two partial teeth; IVPP V236, a partial tooth; IVPP V238, several tooth fragments; and IVPP V239, a single tooth. The teeth form a syntype series and were not found together. Also a very fragmentary skeleton, specimen UCMP 32102, was referred to the genus by Yang. Some of the teeth indicate a large body-size. These fossils, although possibly metriacanthosaurid, are now considered to be non-diagnostic, making S. campi a nomen dubium. The generic name refers to Szechuan. The specific name honours the American paleontologist Charles Lewis Camp who had discovered UCMP 32102.

A partial skeleton, CV 00214, was initially listed by Dong et al. (1978) in a faunal list as a new species of Szechuanosaurus, Szechuanosaurus yandonensis. At first, there was no description or illustration of it, making S. yandonensis at the time a nomen nudum. Later, Dong Zhiming et alii (1983) described it, and assigned it to Szechuanosaurus campi The affinities of this skeleton are uncertain, and it has only been briefly described. Holtz et al. (2004) included it in their phylogenetic analysis and found it to be the most basal tetanuran. This individual was a medium-sized theropod, with an ischium (a pelvic bone) of 420 millimetres (17 in); for comparison, an ischium of Piatnitzkysaurus estimated to weigh 504 kilograms (1,111 lb) is 423 millimetres (16.7 in) long. In 2000, Daniel Chure referred the specimen to "Szechuanoraptor dongi", itself an invalid nomen ex dissertatione. Carrano, Benson & Sampson (2012) synonymized it with Yangchuanosaurus shangyouensis from the same formation.

The third species is Szechuanosaurus zigongensis, named by Gao Yuhui in 1993 for an almost complete skeleton, specimen ZDM 9011. It is an older species, from the Middle Jurassic, appearing to be distinct from the type species and therefore requires its own genus name. It was reassigned to Yangchuanosaurus, as a Yangchuanosaurus zigongensis, by Matthew Carrano, Roger Benson & Scott Sampson in 2012.
