= Paleontology in Thailand =

Paleontology began as a subject of academic interest in Thailand in the early twentieth century, mainly conducted by foreign researchers working with the Royal Department of Mines and Geology, the precursor of the Department of Mineral Resources (DMR). Most early paleontological research was the by-product of mineral exploration for the country's developing mining industry.

The first scientifically described fossil from Thailand was that of the bivalve Posidonomya becheri siamensis from Ban Khuan Dinso in Phatthalung Province, made by F. R. Cowper Reed in 1920. Official cataloging of fossils began two years later, and received contributions by Western paleontologists and geologists. Systematic surveys and studies were later begun by Japanese researchers led by Teiichi Kobayashi, who published their findings on trilobites in Tarutao Island (the oldest fossils found in the country) in 1957. Over the following decades, Japanese and German researchers conducted paleontological research as part of geological surveys throughout the country.

Dinosaur fossils were first discovered in the country in 1973, during uranium surveys in Phu Wiang (now in Wiang Kao District) in Khon Kaen Province, initiating a wave of dinosaur research by Thai and French academics and a rise in public interest in the field. Several new dinosaur species have since been described from several sites in the country's Northeast, and paleontology museums have been established. Continued research is undertaken mainly by the DMR and some universities, as well as other public and private institutions.

== Thailand's first dinosaur discovery ==
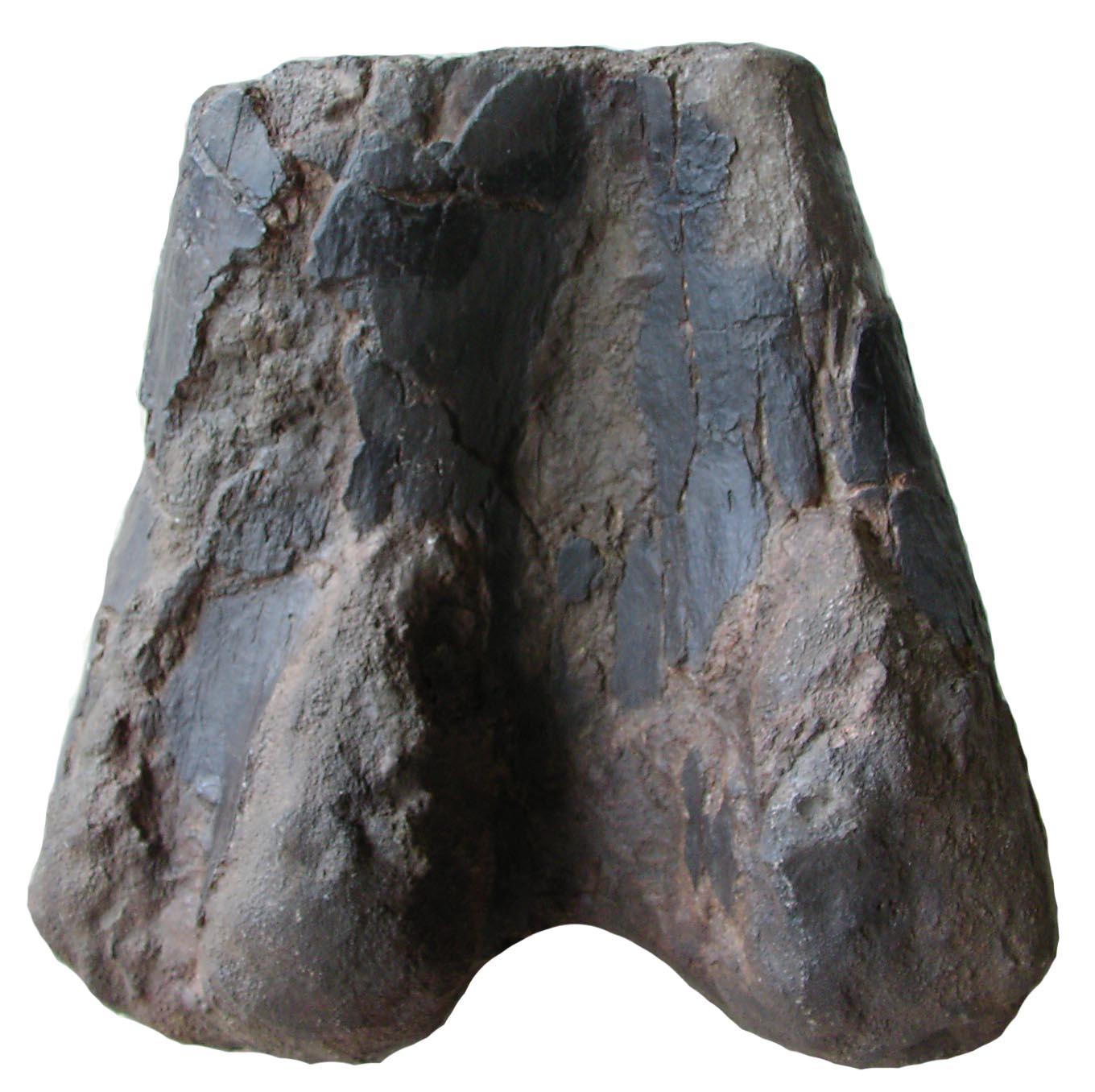
Distal part of a left femur of a sauropod dinosaur regarded as the first dinosaur discovery of Thailand

Beginning in 1970, the US Geological Survey conducted a mineral exploration in the Phu Wiang area of Khon Kaen province and discovered a type of uranium ore, coffinite, in association with copper ores, azurite and malachite. The International Atomic Energy Agency (IAEA) later participated. Between 1975 and 1980, the Department of Mineral Resources conducted a detailed drilling program and in 1976 Sudham Yaemniyom, a geologist, discovered a piece of bone on a streambed, Huai Pratu Tima, which was later identified as a distal part of the left femur of a sauropod dinosaur, regarded as the first dinosaur discovery of Thailand.

== Expedition and research ==
Since 1976, the Department of Mineral Resources, together with the Thai-French Paleontological Project, investigated the dinosaurs in the Phu Wiang mountains. The project found many vertebrae, teeth, and dinosaur footprints mainly from sandstone of the Early Cretaceous Sao Khua Formation (about 130 million years old), including sauropod and theropod, with a wide range of sizes, from a hen up to a large dinosaur with about 15 meters long. These finds led Thai people to visit the dinosaur sites, and Princess Maha Chakri Sirindhorn visited Site 2 on 3 November 1989. She also revisited the site, viewing Site 3 and the Phu Wiang Dinosaur Museum, with the committees of the Prince Mahidol International Award, of the Prince Mahidol Award Foundation, on 25 October 2008.

== Summary ==
Year of Discovery	Year of Naming	Species	Place of Excavation	Age	picture	ref.
1981	1986	Siamosaurus suteethorni	Phu Wiang, Khon Kaen Province	Early Cretaceous		
1988	1992	Psittacosaurus sattayaraki	Chaiyaphum Province	Early Cretaceous		
1982	1994	Phuwiangosaurus sirindhornae	Phu Wiang, Khon Kaen Province	Early Cretaceous		
1993	1996	Siamotyrannus isanensis	Phu Wiang, Khon Kaen Province	Early Cretaceous		
1998	2000	Isanosaurus attavipachi	Chaiyaphum Province	Late Triassic		
1995	2009	Kinnareemimus khonkaenensis	Phu Wiang, Khon Kaen Province	Early Cretaceous		
1999	2011	Siamodon nimngami	Nakhon Ratchasima Province	Early Cretaceous		
2007	2011	Ratchasimasaurus suranareae	Nakhon Ratchasima Province	Early Cretaceous		
2016	2015	Sirindhorna khoratensis	Nakhon Ratchasima Province	Early Cretaceous		
1993	2019	Phuwiangvenator yaemniyomi	Phu Wiang, Khon Kaen Province	Early Cretaceous		
1988	2019	Vayuraptor nongbualamphuensis	Nong Bua Lamphu Province	Early Cretaceous		
2007	2019	Siamraptor suwati	Nakhon Ratchasima Province	Early Cretaceous		
2016	2023	Minimocursor phunoiensis	Kalasin Province	Late Jurassic		
2016	2026	Nagatitan chaiyaphumensis	Chaiyaphum Province	Early Cretaceous		
2016	2026	Uragasaurus kalasinensis	Kalasin Province	Late Jurassic		

== See also ==
- Geology of Thailand
- Varavudh Suteethorn
- Sirindhorn Museum
