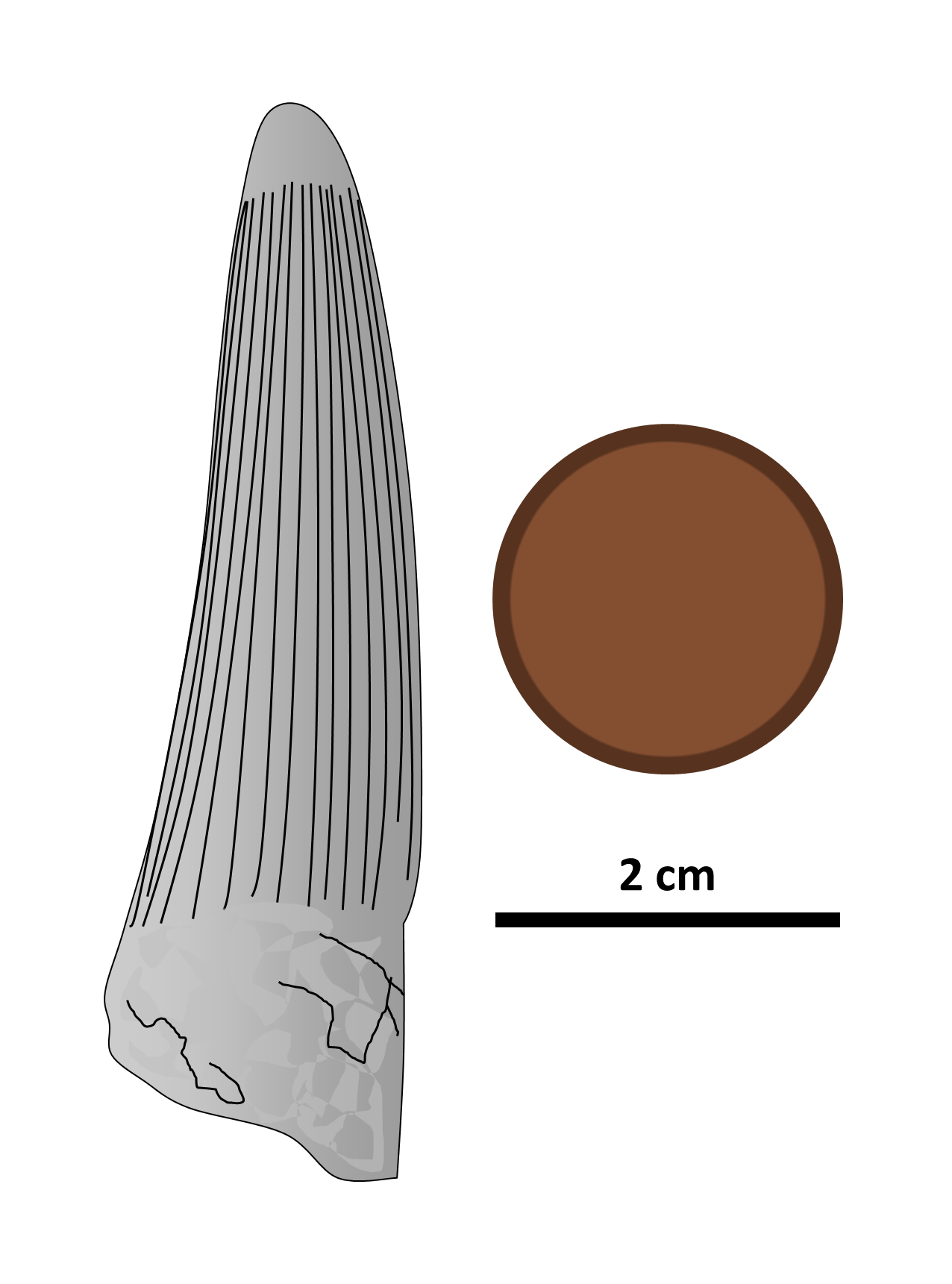
- Illustration of the holotype tooth, with British penny for scale

Scientific classification
- Kingdom: Animalia
- Phylum: Chordata
- Class: Reptilia
- Clade: Dinosauria
- Clade: Saurischia
- Clade: Theropoda
- Family: †Spinosauridae
- Genus: †Siamosaurus; Buffetaut & Ingavat, 1986
- Species: †S. suteethorni

Binomial name
- †Siamosaurus suteethorni Buffetaut & Ingavat, 1986

Synonyms
- "Sinopliosaurus" fusuiensis? Hou, Yeh & Zhao, 1975

= Siamosaurus =

Siamosaurus Temporal range: Early Cretaceous (Barremian–Aptian), ~129–113 Ma

Potentially dubious genus of spinosaurid theropod dinosaur

Siamosaurus (meaning "Siam lizard") is a potentially dubious genus of spinosaurid dinosaur that lived in what is now Thailand and possibly China during the Early Cretaceous period (Barremian to Aptian) and is the first reported spinosaurid from Asia. It is confidently known only from tooth fossils; the first were found in the Sao Khua Formation, with more teeth later recovered from the younger Khok Kruat Formation. The only species Siamosaurus suteethorni, whose name honours Thai palaeontologist Varavudh Suteethorn, was formally described in 1986. In 2009, four teeth from China previously attributed to a pliosaur—under the species "Sinopliosaurus" fusuiensis—were identified as those of a spinosaurid, possibly Siamosaurus. It is yet to be determined if two partial spinosaurid skeletons from Thailand and an isolated tooth from Japan also belong to Siamosaurus.

Since it is based only on teeth, Siamosaurus's body size is uncertain, though it has been estimated at between 5.1 to 9.1 metres (17 to 30 feet) in length. The holotype tooth is 62.5 millimetres (2.46 inches) long. Siamosaurus's teeth were straight, oval to circular in cross-section, and lined with distinct lengthwise grooves. Its teeth had wrinkled enamel, similar to teeth from the related genus Baryonyx. As a spinosaur it would have had a long, low snout and robust forelimbs, and one possible skeleton indicates the presence of a tall sail running down its back, another typical trait of this theropod family. Siamosaurus is considered by some palaeontologists to be a dubious name, with some arguing that its teeth are hard to differentiate from those of other Early Cretaceous spinosaurids, and others that it may not be a dinosaur at all. Based on dental traits, Siamosaurus and "S." fusuiensis have been placed in the subfamily Spinosaurinae.

Like in all spinosaurids, Siamosaurus's teeth were conical, with reduced or absent serrations. This made them suitable for impaling rather than tearing flesh, a trait typically seen in largely piscivorous (fish-eating) animals. Spinosaurids are also known to have consumed pterosaurs and small dinosaurs, and there is fossil evidence of Siamosaurus itself feeding on sauropod dinosaurs, either via scavenging or active hunting. Siamosaurus's role as a partially piscivorous predator may have reduced the prominence of some contemporaneous crocodilians competing for the same food sources. Isotope analysis of the teeth of Siamosaurus and other spinosaurids indicates semiaquatic habits. Siamosaurus lived in a semi-arid habitat of floodplains and meandering rivers, where it coexisted with other dinosaurs, as well as pterosaurs, fishes, turtles, crocodyliforms, and other aquatic animals.

== History of discovery ==
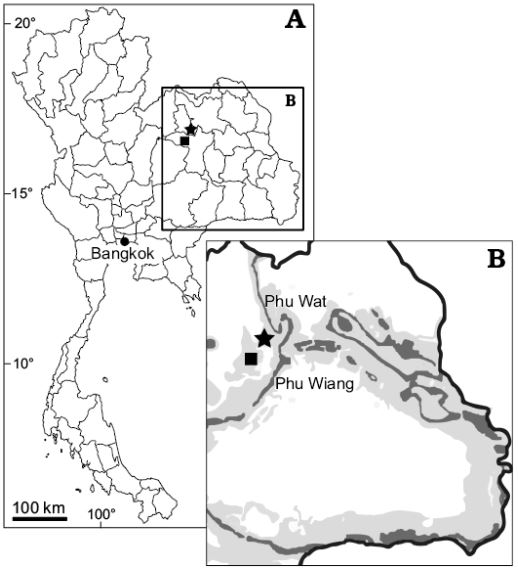
Map of northeastern Thailand, with outcrops of the Sao Khua Formation (dark gray) and the Khok Kruat and Phu Kradung Formations (light gray)

The Sao Khua Formation, where the first Siamosaurus fossils were discovered, is part of the Khorat Group. The formation is dated to the Barremian stage of the Early Cretaceous period, 129.4 to 125 million years ago. In 1983, French palaeontologist Éric Buffetaut and his Thai colleague Rucha Ingavat described a set of fossil teeth recovered from the Phu Pratu Teema locality of the Sao Khua Formation, in the Phu Wiang area of Khon Kaen Province. They did not conclude as to what animal they originated from, their opinion being that the specimens belonged "either to an unusual theropod dinosaur or to some unknown crocodilian". In 1986, a reassessment of the remains by the same authors attributed them to a new genus and species of spinosaurid theropod, which they named Siamosaurus suteethorni. The generic name alludes to the ancient name of Thailand, "Siam", and is combined with the Ancient Greek word σαῦρος (sauros), meaning "lizard" or "reptile". The specific name honours Thai geologist and palaeontologist Varavudh Suteethorn, and his contributions to vertebrate palaeontology discoveries in Thailand.

The best-preserved specimen from the teeth described, designated DMR TF 2043a, was chosen as the holotype of Siamosaurus. The paratypes comprise eight other well-preserved teeth catalogued as DMR TF 2043b to i. The original fossils are currently housed in the palaeontological collection of the Department of Mineral Resources in Bangkok. Siamosaurus teeth are common in the Sao Khua Formation, and further isolated specimens were found later throughout the late 20th and early 21st centuries. Sculptures of the animal have been erected in various places across northeastern Thailand, including Si Wiang Dinosaur Park, the Siam Paragon shopping mall in Bangkok, the Phu Wiang Dinosaur Museum, and the Sirindhorn Museum. S. suteethorni was also illustrated on Thai postage stamps released in 1997, along with fellow Thai dinosaurs Phuwiangosaurus, Siamotyrannus, and Psittacosaurus.

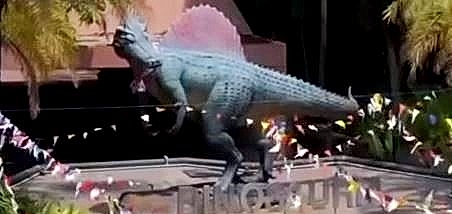
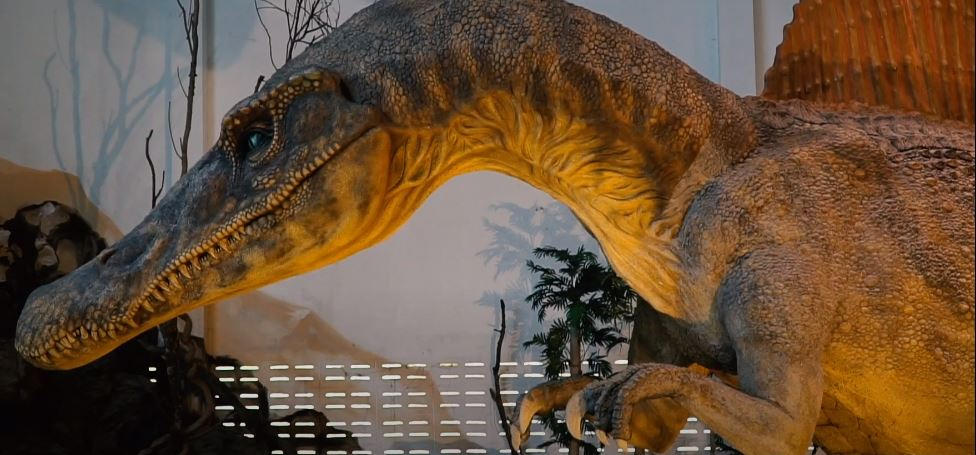
Sculptures of Siamosaurus at the Sirindhorn Museum (top) and Phu Wiang Dinosaur Museum (bottom); both buildings also house fossils of the animal.

Thailand's Khok Kruat Formation is dated to the Aptian age (between 125 and 113 million years ago), younger than the Sao Khua Formation. The Khok Kruat Formation has provided many spinosaurid teeth, including ones from Siamosaurus and closely allied forms. Given the varied size and morphology of the teeth found, the presence of multiple spinosaur taxa in the region is likely. Nearly 60 fossil teeth were recovered from the formation during fieldwork by Thai-French palaeontological teams between 2003 and 2008, including specimens from the Sam Ran, Khok Pha Suam, and Lam Pao Dam localities. Eight of these teeth were described in detail by Kamonrak and colleagues in 2019, and classified into two main morphotypes: the Khok Kruat morphotype, which is found only in the Khok Kruat Formation, and the Siamosaurus morphotype, which includes forms widely recovered from both the Sao Khua and Khok Kruat Formations.

Siamosaurus is the first reported spinosaurid dinosaur from Asia, and subsequently to its naming, material resembling or possibly belonging to the genus has been found across the continent. In 1975, Chinese palaeontologist Hou Lian-Hai and colleagues described five teeth as a new species of the pliosauroid Sinopliosaurus, which they named S. fusuiensis, the specific name is in reference to Fusui County in Guangxi, China, from which the fossils were collected. Four of these teeth—one was not found in the museum collection—were reassigned by Buffetaut and colleagues in 2008 to a spinosaurid theropod and referred to as "Sinopliosaurus" fusuiensis. The researchers deemed it as "closely related to, if not identical with", S. suteethorni. In 2019, "S." fusuiensis was referred to by Thai palaeontologist Wongko Kamonrak and colleagues as Siamosaurus sp. (of uncertain species). Later in 2019, Thai palaeontologist Adun Samathi and colleagues considered the teeth as belonging to an indeterminate spinosaurid. The specimens were retrieved from China's Early Cretaceous Xinlong Formation, in which spinosaurid teeth are frequently reported, though most of them are hard to differentiate from those of Japan or Thailand without more complete fossil material, such as a skull. Buffetaut and Suteethorn suggested that the Xinlong Formation could be geologically related to the Sao Khua or Khok Kruat Formation, since similar types of fossils have been recovered in all three regions.

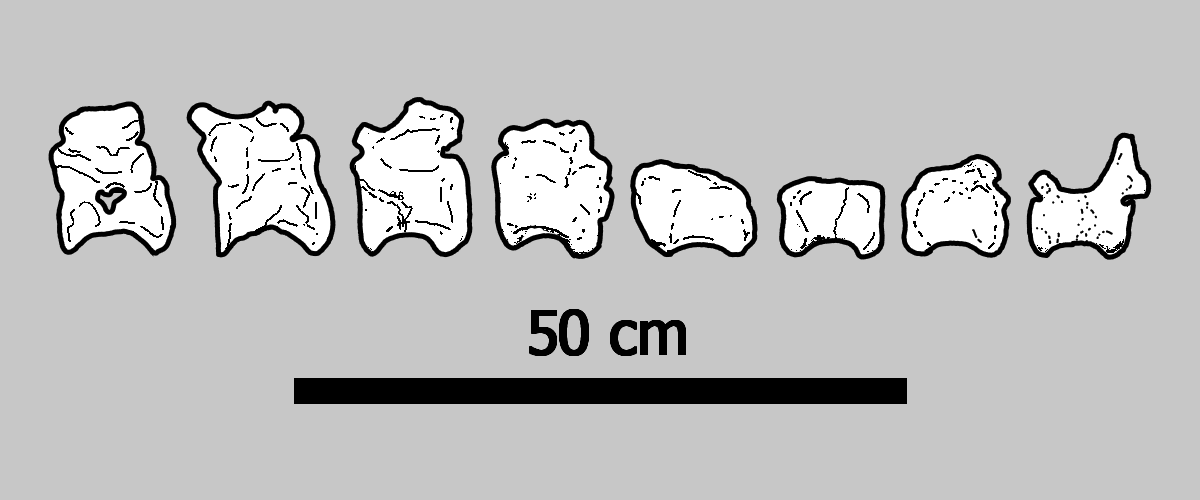
Illustration of caudal (tail) vertebrae of "Phuwiang spinosaurid B" from the Sao Khua Formation, whose remains are potentially attributable to S. suteethorni

In 1994, an isolated tooth (specimen GMNH-PV-999) was found by a fossil prospector in the Sebayashi Formation, Japan. The tooth was believed, until 2003, to belong to a marine reptile, when Japanese palaeontologist Yoshikazu Hasegawa and colleagues assigned it to ?Siamosaurus sp. The tooth came from rocks dated to the Barremian, similar in age to sediments that Siamosaurus teeth have been recovered from in Thailand. In 2015, a more incomplete tooth was recovered from the same formation by two local children. Kept under the specimen number KDC-PV-0003, the tooth was assigned to an indeterminate spinosaurid in 2017 by Japanese palaeontologist Kubota Katsuhiro and colleagues. Further spinosaurid teeth from unnamed and indeterminate forms have been discovered in central China and Malaysia.

In 2004, excavation began on a partial skeleton from an outcrop of the Khok Kruat Formation near the city of Khon Kaen. The specimen (SM-KK 14) consists of cervical (neck) and dorsal (back) vertebrae, a 60-centimetre (24-inch) high neural spine (upwards-extending process from top of vertebra), pelvis (hip) fragments, a possible metacarpal (long bone of the hand), and a chevron from the tail. The cervical vertebrae and pelvic region resemble those of the European spinosaur Baryonyx walkeri, and the neural spine is elongated, similarly to those of other spinosaurids. A Siamosaurus tooth found nearby indicates the skeleton may belong to this genus, though this could also represent evidence of scavenging. The skeleton, as well as two well-preserved teeth—SM2016-1-147 and SM2016-1-165, also attributed to Siamosaurus—are currently stored in the vertebrate fossil collection of the Sirindhorn Museum, Kalasin Province. In 2019, a series of spinosaurid caudal (tail) vertebrae possibly belonging to S. suteethorni were recovered from the Sao Khua Formation, and described in a dissertation by Samathi. The fossils (SM-PW9B-11 to 17, SM-PW9B, SM-PW9A-unnumbered, SM-PW9-unnumbered, and SM 2017-1-176) were designated by Samathi as "Phuwiang spinosaurid B", and bear similarities to the possible spinosaurid Camarillasaurus and a Baryonyx specimen discovered in Portugal.

== Description ==
Tentatively estimated size of Siamosaurus (in gray) and "Phuwiang spinosaurid B" (in red), which may represent the same taxon

In 2004, American dinosaur researcher Don Lessem estimated Siamosaurus at 9.1 metres (30 feet) long. In 2005, British author Sussana Davidson and colleagues gave a lower estimate of 8 m (26 ft) in length and weighing 1 tonne (1.1 short tons; 0.98 long tons). In a 2016 popular book, authors Rubén Molina-Pérez and Asier Larramendi estimated it at approximately 5.1 m (17 ft) long, 1.45 m (4.8 ft) tall at the hips, and weighing 255 kilograms (562 pounds). However, reliable calculations on the weight and body size of fragmentary dinosaurs like Siamosaurus are hindered by the lack of good material, such as a skull or postcranial skeleton, and thus estimates are only tentative. "Phuwiang spinosaurid B" was calculated as approximately 5 m (16 ft) long by Samathi in 2019. As a spinosaurid, Siamosaurus would have had low, narrow, and elongated jaws; well-built forelimbs; relatively short hindlimbs; and elongated neural spines on the vertebrae forming a sail on its back.

=== Type specimens ===
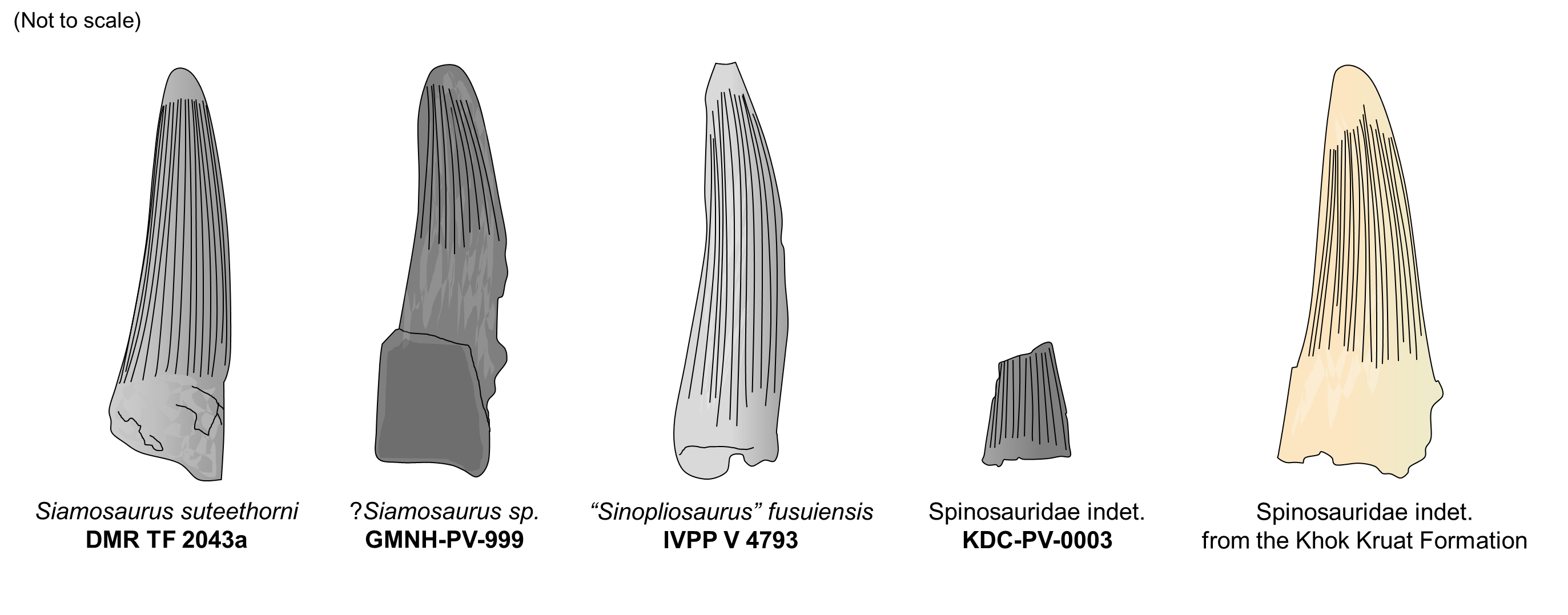
Diagram comparing the holotype tooth (first from left) with other spinosaurid teeth from Asia.

Fossil theropod teeth are typically identified by attributes such as the proportions, size, and curvature of the crown, as well as the presence and/or shape of the denticles (serrations). The holotype of S. suteethorni (specimen DMR TF 2043a) is 62.5 millimetres (2.46 in) in total length, with the crown being 47.7 mm (1.88 in) long, and 16.6 by 12.5 mm (0.65 by 0.49 in) wide at its base. It is among the larger teeth discovered by Buffetaut and Ingavat. One much smaller specimen (DMR TF 2043b) measures 24.3 mm (0.96 in) in length. According to the authors, this dramatic size range suggests the teeth are from individuals of different ages. Among theropods, this may also indicate size variation along the tooth row in the jaws, which is observed to have been prevalent in spinosaurids.

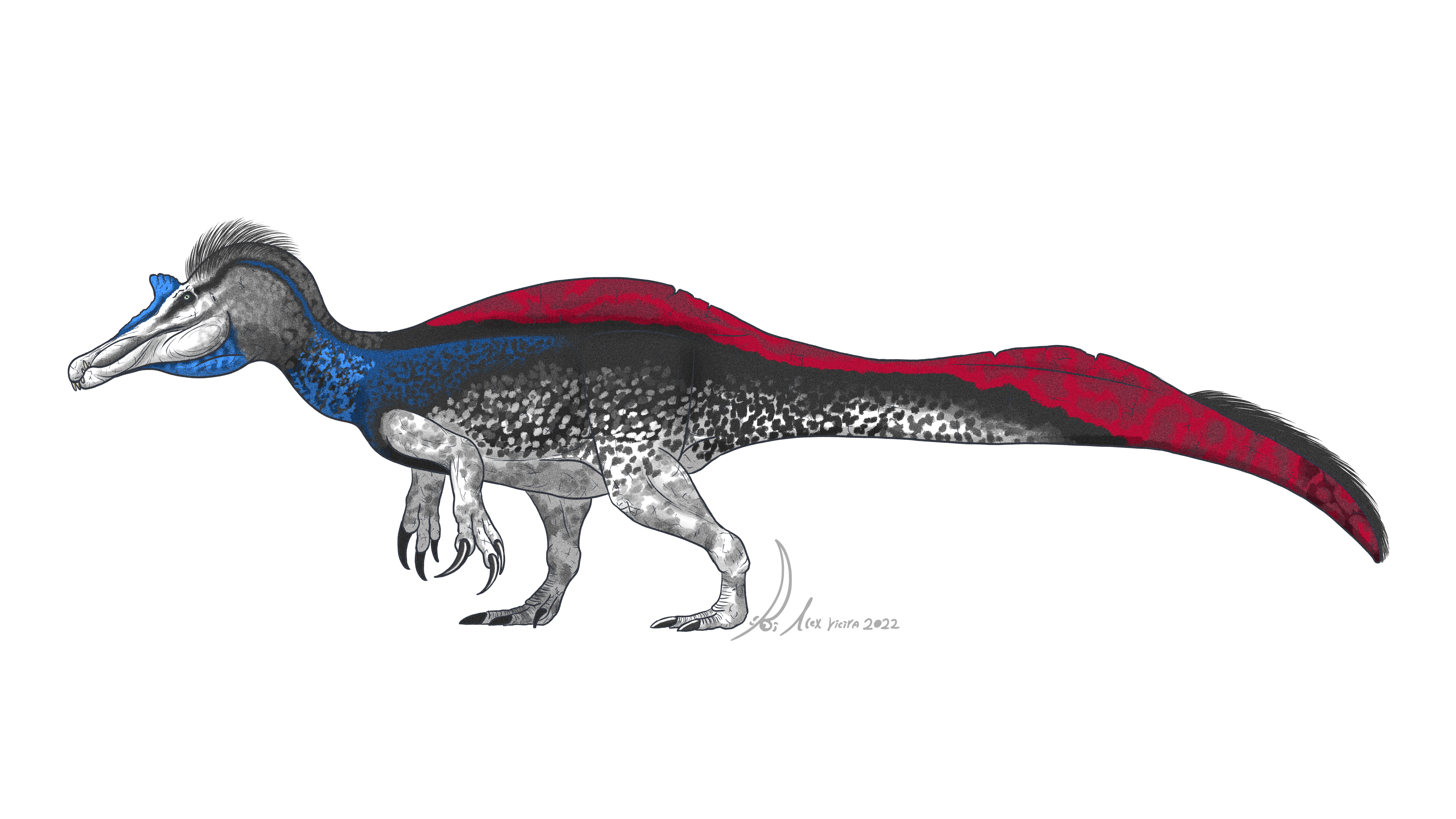
Hypothetical life restoration.

The holotype tooth is relatively straight, with only minor front to back curvature. It is oval in cross-section while other specimens are nearly circular in this aspect. Unlike in most theropods, the carinae (cutting edges) of Siamosaurus teeth lack well-defined serrations, though unworn teeth do exhibit very fine denticles. Some teeth (including the holotype) have a wave-like double recurvature when viewed from the front or back, which Buffetaut and Ingavat compared to that seen in carnosaur teeth from the same formation and one Deinonychus tooth described by John Ostrom in 1969. The S. suteethorni holotype is symmetrically concave front to back, and bears 15 flutes (lengthwise grooves) on its lingual (inward facing) and labial (outward facing) surfaces. These flutes run from the base of the crown before stopping 5 mm (0.20 in) from the rounded tooth tip. A region of the holotype where the enamel (outer layer of the teeth) has weathered away reveals that these flutes extend down to the dentin (second layer of the teeth). The enamel also has a granular (finely wrinkled) texture, as seen in teeth from the spinosaurid Baryonyx. Some of the root is preserved in the holotype and, as in all theropods, there is a large pocket for the tooth pulp, which would have housed blood vessels and nerves.

=== Khok Kruat teeth ===
Of the two Khok Kruat Formation tooth morphotypes assigned by Kamonrak and colleagues in 2019, morphotype I, the Khok Kruat morphotype, is on average 46.35 mm (1.825 in) in total length, of which the crown takes up 43.77 mm (1.723 in), with a 18.40 by 13.5 mm (0.724 by 0.531 in) wide base. They are oval in cross-section, have well-defined carinae, and a smooth enamel surface, which becomes wrinkled at the base of the crown. They bear fine, sharply defined flutes, of which there are about 21 to 32 on each side. Morphotype II, the Siamosaurus morphotype, is on average 51.25 mm (2.018 in) long, with a 48.30 mm (1.902 in) tall crown that is 17.30 by 14.65 mm (0.681 by 0.577 in) wide at the base. They are also oval in cross-section and have distinct carinae, but unlike the Khok Kruat morphotype, the entire length of the crown has wrinkled enamel, and the flutes are coarser and fewer in number, with 11 to 16 on each side. The Siamosaurus morphotype also shares with S. suteethorni, GMNH-PV-999, and IVPP V 4793 a wrinkled enamel surface and between 12 and 15 flutes on each side.

=== Possible material ===
==== Teeth ====
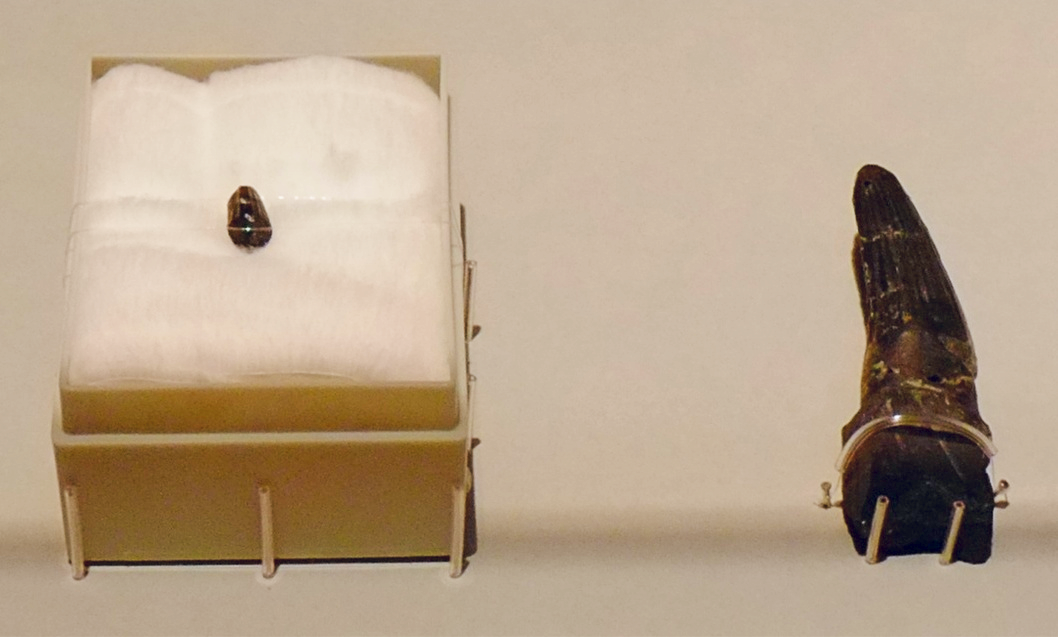
Partial tooth of an indeterminate spinosaurid (KDC-PV-0003) and possible Siamosaurus tooth (GMNH-PV-999), in the National Museum of Nature and Science, Tokyo

The first Sebayashi Formation specimen (GMNH-PV-999) is an isolated tooth crown with a partially intact root. It is not known in which jaw the tooth was positioned or which surface faced the inside or outside of the mouth. The tooth's front and back carinae are well-defined, though the former is not well-preserved. Besides having a broader, 20 by 14 mm (0.79 by 0.55 in) wide base and being slightly smaller at 51 mm (2.0 in) in length, GMNH-PV-999 has a very similar morphology to the S. suteethorni holotype. Features shared between the two specimens include: a straight and only slightly compressed shape; a somewhat oval cross-section; no serrations on the carinae (possibly due to bad preservation); and flutes on the crown surface, the Japanese specimen having 12 on each side. The teeth also share a crown surface with numerous small granular structures oriented parallel to their lengths. Because of these resemblances, Hasegawa and colleagues regarded GMNH-PV-999 as nearly identical to the S. suteethorni holotype tooth. The blood grooves (tiny furrows in the gaps between each denticle) of GMNH-PV-999 have an oblique orientation of 45 degrees, as in Baryonyx and KDC-PV-0003, the second Sebayashi formation tooth, which consists of a slightly recurved crown fragment with an almost circular cross-section. It has better preservation of small details than the former specimens, such as visible, though poorly defined serrations, with two to three denticles per mm (0.039 in). Like GMNH-PV-999, it has a granular texture and at least 12 flutes on its surface, not all of which stretch to the crown's full length.

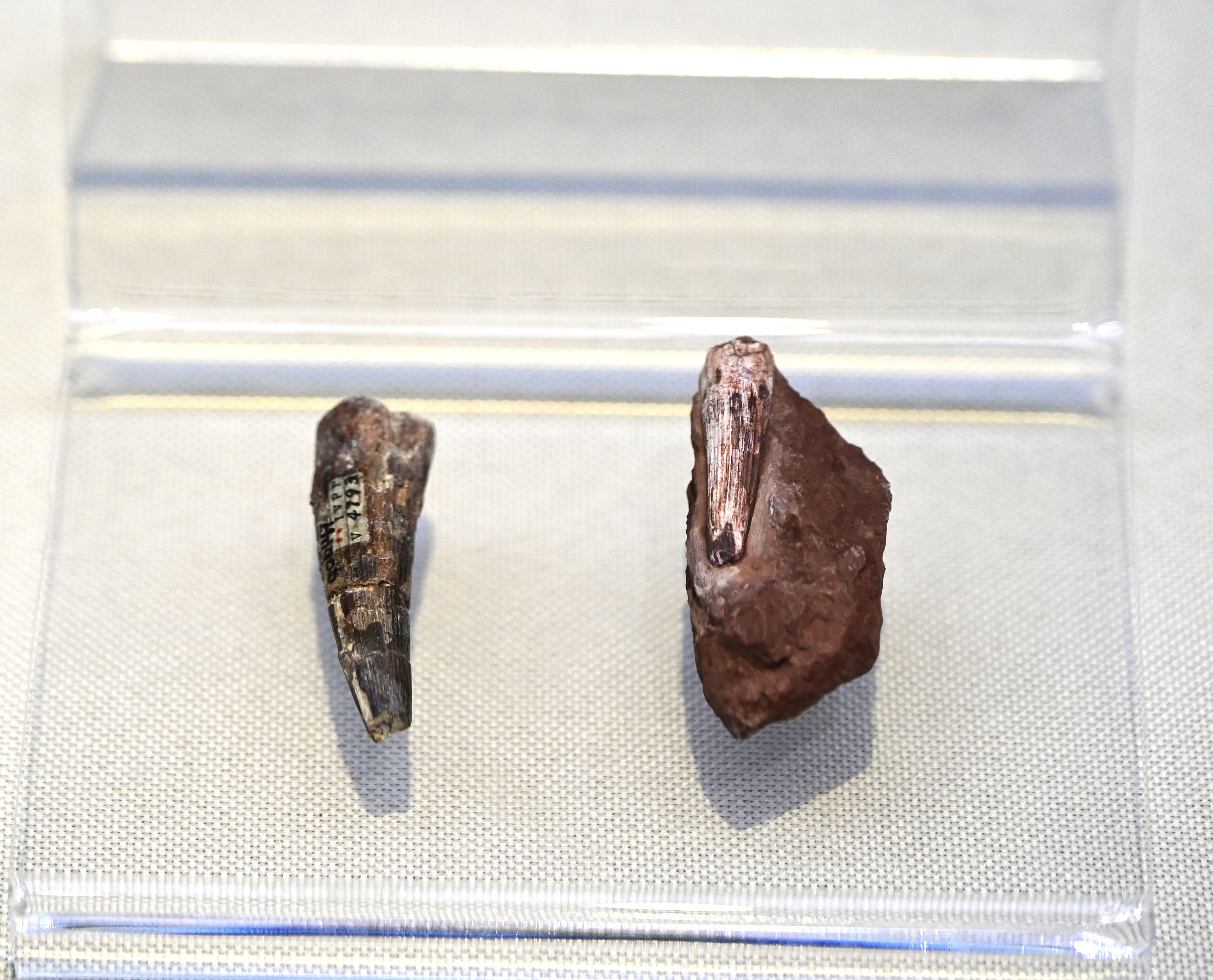
Teeth of "Sinopliosaurus" fusuiensis, National Natural History Museum of China

Out of the four teeth attributed to "S." fusuiensis, specimen IVPP V 4793 is the most intact, although still somewhat deformed. The crown, which is missing its tip, is 69 mm (2.7 in) long and 16.5 by 13 mm (0.65 by 0.51 in) wide at the base. The tooth is straight, only slightly recurved, and has an oval cross-section. The front and rear carinae are distinct, though their serrations have been heavily eroded, similar to those of KDC-PV-0003. Like the Thai and Japanese teeth, the "S." fusuiensis specimens bear developed flutes and a granular surface. As in both Sebayashi Formation teeth, there are 12 flutes on each face of the "S." fusuiensis teeth. Like in KDC-PV-0003, these flutes vary in length. Buffetaut and colleagues found the "S." fusuiensis teeth most similar to those of Siamosaurus, given their identical crown shape, fluting, and granular enamel.

==== Postcrania ====
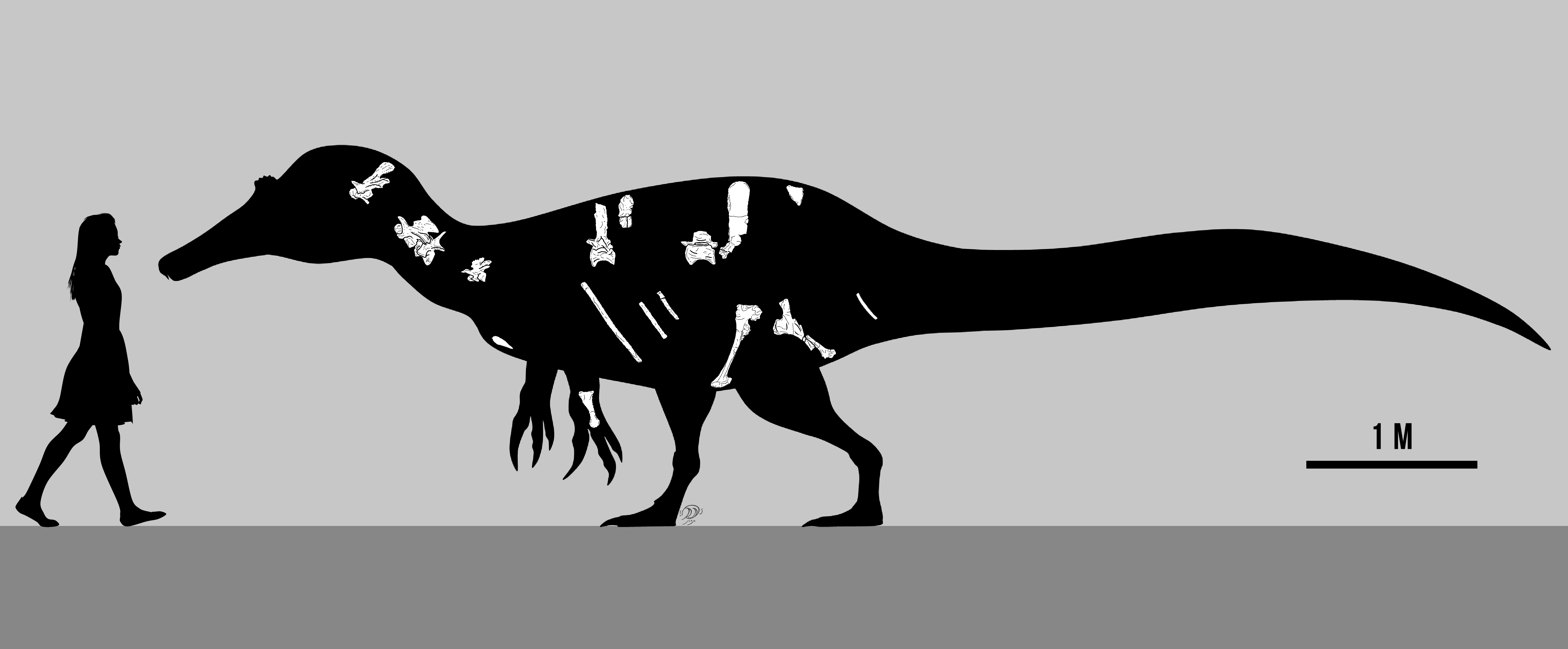
Skeletal diagram showing known elements of spinosaurid specimen SM-KK 14.

Though no skeletal elements were associated with the original Siamosaurus teeth, the Khok Kruat skeleton, SM-KK 14, may be attributable to the genus. The cervical vertebrae of SM-KK 14 had elongated centra (vertebral bodies) with articulating surfaces that were not offset, as well as prominent epipophyses (processes to which neck muscles attached) and strong ligament scars. All of these characteristics were also present in Baryonyx. The cervicals also became longer towards the front of the neck and—based on comparison with Baryonyx—may represent the fourth, sixth, seventh, and tenth vertebrae. The dorsal vertebrae had enlarged infraprezygapophyseal fossae—depressions under the prezygapophyses, which connect adjacent vertebrae—and their neural spines were elongated similarly to those of other spinosaurids, indicating the presence of a sail on the animal's back; like in the Asian spinosaurid Ichthyovenator. One of the neural spines of SM-KK 14 measured at least 60 centimetres (24 inches) in height. The chevron lacked a process on its front end, as in other spinosaurids. Viewed distally (towards the centre of attachment), the lower end of the pubis had an L-shape, similar to that of Ichthyovenator and the African Suchomimus. Also as in Ichthyovenator, the hind rim of the pubis had a notch-like obturator foramen. However, in SM-KK 14 the front of the pubis was concave and the chevrons were curved backwards, in contrast to the straight condition these bones had in Ichthyovenator.

== Classification ==
In 1986, Buffetaut and Ingavat classified Siamosaurus as a theropod because of the straight, tall crown and double sideways recurvature of its teeth. At the time, Siamosaurus's particular combination of dental characteristics, especially the longitudinal fluting and lack of serrations, had not been observed in other theropods. The authors noted similarities in Siamosaurus's teeth to those of ceratosaurian tooth crowns, some of which also have longitudinal flutes. However, this identification was ruled out, since ceratosaur teeth are more narrow and blade-like in cross-section, bear far fewer dental flutes, and have distinct serrations. Buffetaut and Suteethorn concluded that the closest taxon in dentition to Siamosaurus was Spinosaurus aegyptiacus from Egypt, whose fragmentary fossils had been destroyed during World War II. Like Siamosaurus, this African taxon had straight and unserrated conical teeth. Though Spinosaurus lacked the developed flutes seen in Siamosaurus, Buffetaut and Ingavat noted that both smooth and fluted spinosaur teeth had been reported from Africa. Therefore, they tentatively placed Siamosaurus in the family Spinosauridae, based on the close similarities in dentition to S. aegyptiacus.

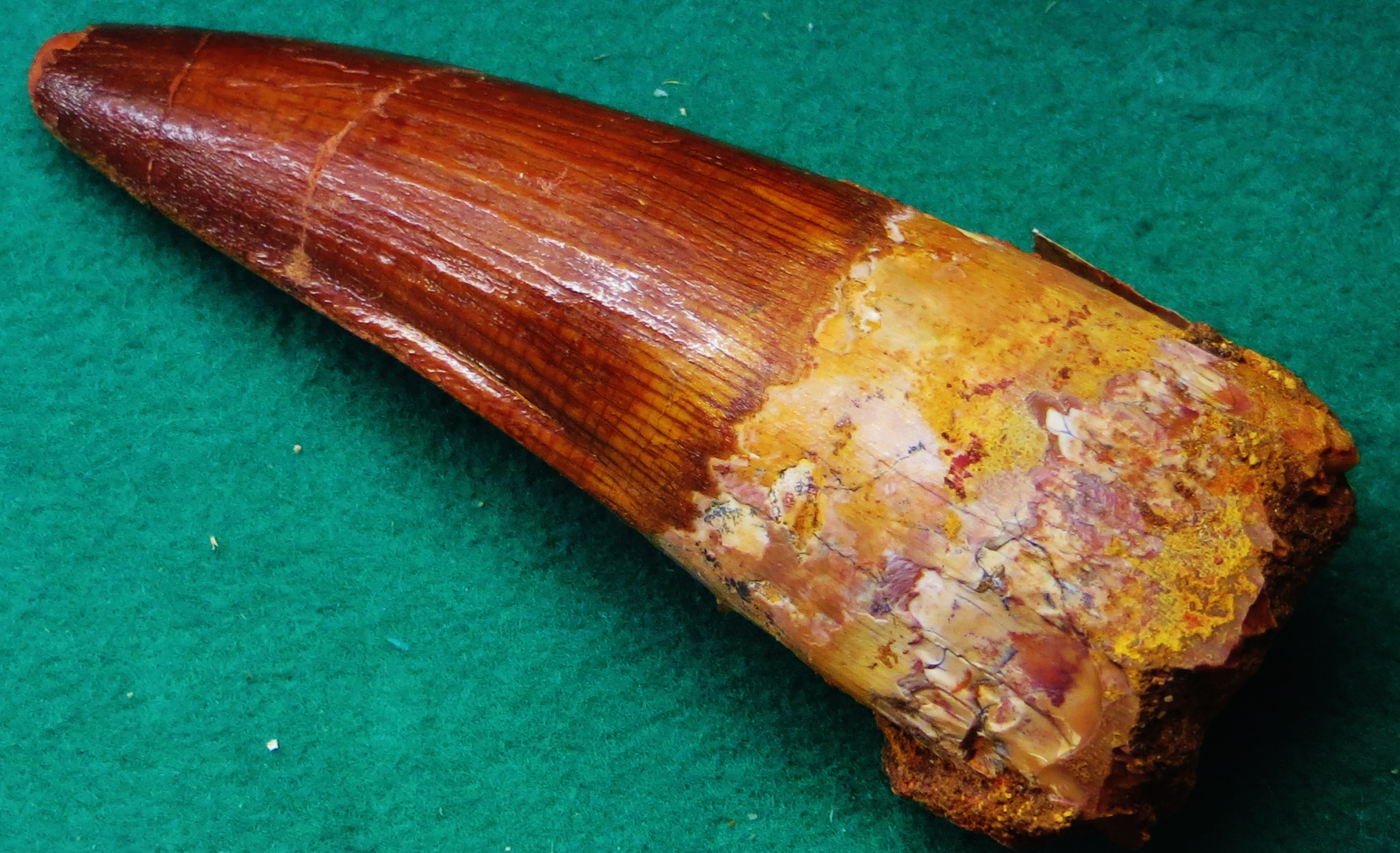
Tooth of the related genus Spinosaurus, Museo di Storia Naturale A. Stoppani, Lombardy

Many palaeontologists later questioned Buffetaut and Ingavat's identification of Siamosaurus, given that spinosaurid teeth, including many from Asia, have often been mistaken for those of aquatic reptiles like crocodilians, plesiosaurs, and ichthyosaurs. In view of this, the German palaeontologist Hans-Dieter Sues and colleagues in 2002 asserted that there is not enough material to confidently identify Siamosaurus as a dinosaur. In 2004, American palaeontologist Thomas Holtz and colleagues considered it a dubious name, stating that the teeth might instead belong to a contemporaneous fish such as a saurodontid or an ichthyodectid teleost. The same year, American palaeontologist David Weishampel and colleagues considered Siamosaurus an indeterminate theropod. In 2012, an analysis by American palaeontologist Matthew Carrano and colleagues agreed with the possibility of confusion with other reptiles, and regarded the genus as a possible indeterminate spinosaurid. They noted that oftentimes, isolated teeth are an unstable foundation for naming new theropod taxa, and most species based on them turn out to be invalid. This problem is especially common with spinosaurids, given that skull and skeletal fossils from the group are rare.

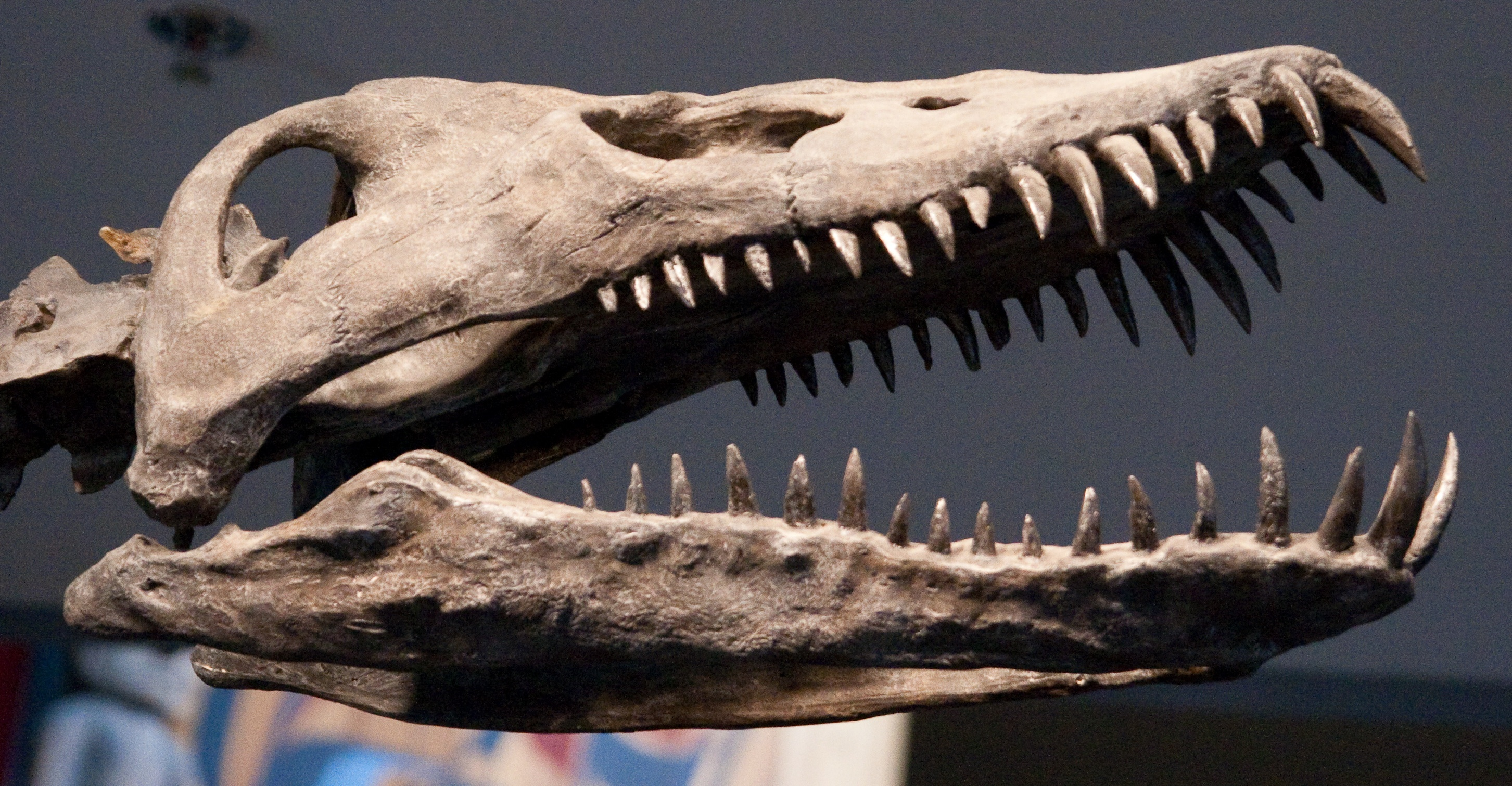
Spinosaurid teeth are often mistaken for those of plesiosaurs (above) and vice versa, though there are certain differences between their dentition.

Authors such as Buffetaut and Ingavat in 1986, and Hasegawa and colleagues in 2003, have noted that since crocodilian teeth are usually more strongly recurved than spinosaur teeth, they can be distinguished from each other. Crocodilians also lack the lateral double recurvature of Siamosaurus's tooth crowns, which, based on their shape, were vertically inserted into the jaw, whereas long-snouted crocodilian teeth are usually angled outwards from the mouth. Though Siamosaurus and plesiosaur teeth are similar in overall shape, Buffetaut and Ingavat pointed out that plesiosaur teeth were significantly more recurved. Other researchers also noted that compared to plesiosaurs, Asian spinosaurid teeth also have coarser and more numerous flutes that extend almost the whole length of the crown. In 2008, Buffetaut and colleagues stated that the "S." fusuiensis teeth bear carinae on the plane of the crown's curvature, a condition not observed in plesiosaur teeth. The discovery of the Khok Kruat skeleton and of baryonychine teeth with dental flutes similar to those of Siamosaurus, were also brought up by the researchers as further evidence of Siamosaurus's spinosaurid classification. Later discoveries revealed that largely straight tooth crowns with flutes and a lack or reduction of serrations were unique characteristics of spinosaurid teeth.

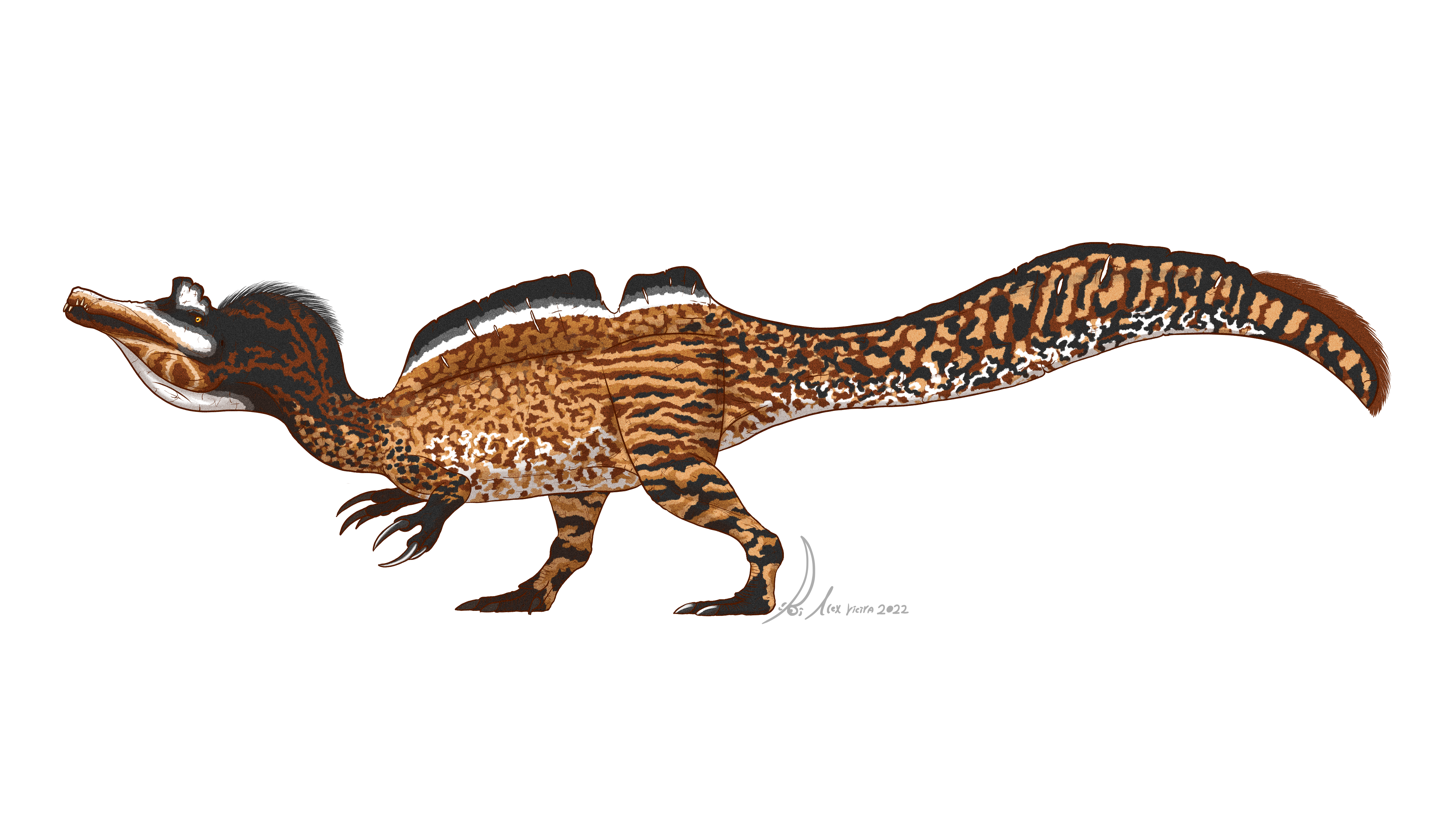
Restoration of Ichthyovenator, a spinosaurine from what is now Laos and one of the closest known relatives of Siamosaurus.

In 2014, Italian palaeontologist Federico Fanti and colleagues considered the various spinosaurid teeth from East Asia, including those of S. suteethorni, as identical to those of Spinosaurus. In 2017, Brazilian palaeontologists Marcos Sales and Cesar Schultz suggested that the various Asian teeth might eventually be attributed to Ichthyovenator-like forms. The researchers accepted Siamosaurus as a spinosaurid, but stated that its teeth and those of "S." fusuiensis are too similar to those of other Early Cretaceous spinosaurids to erect new taxa unequivocally; and thus considered both taxa as dubious. Carrano and colleagues noted that the Khok Kruat skeleton may provide answers to their identification. Authors such as Milner and colleagues in 2007, Bertin Tor in 2010, Holtz in 2011, and Kamonrak and colleagues in 2019 regarded the Khok Kruat skeleton as first definitive evidence of spinosaurs in Asia. In 2012, French palaeontologist Ronan Allain and colleagues described a partial skeleton from the Grès supérieurs Formation of Laos, and used it to name the new spinosaurid genus and species Ichthyovenator laosensis. They considered it the first definitive evidence of spinosaurids in Asia, in light of the debated identity of Siamosaurus and "S." fusuiensis. In a 2014 abstract, Allain announced that further Ichthyovenator material, including three teeth, had been excavated. Typically of spinosaurines, Ichthyovenator's teeth bore straight and unserrated crowns, though no comparison was made to the other Asian teeth.

The taxonomic and phylogenetic affinities of the Spinosauridae are subject to active research and debate, given that in comparison to other theropod groups, many of the family's taxa are based on poor fossil material. Traditionally, the group is split into the subfamilies Spinosaurinae (unserrated, straight teeth with well marked flutes and more circular cross-sections) and Baryonychinae (finely serrated, somewhat recurved teeth with weaker flutes and a more oval cross-section). Since spinosaurines were, on average, larger animals than baryonychines, their teeth were also generally larger. The morphological variation seen in spinosaurid teeth, however, has shown that the aforementioned characteristics are not always consistent within the subfamilies. Likewise, the Khok Kruat skeleton shares mixed characteristics between Baryonyx and Spinosaurus, and its precise phylogenetic placement is uncertain pending a description of the material. The possibility that Baryonychinae is a paraphyletic (unnatural) grouping has been suggested by researchers such as Sales and Schultz, on the basis that genera such as Irritator and Angaturama (the two are possible synonyms) may represent intermediate forms between baryonychines and spinosaurines. As it is definitively known only from teeth, Siamosaurus's exact position within the Spinosauridae is difficult to determine. In 2004, Brazilian palaeontologists Elaine Machado and Alexander Kellner suggested it as a possible spinosaurine, given its lack of dental serrations. Likewise in 2010, British palaeontologist David Hone and colleagues placed Siamosaurus and "S." fusuiensis in the Spinosaurinae. British palaeontologist Thomas Arden and colleagues identified Siamosaurus as a basal (early diverging or "primitive") member of this subfamily in 2019; their cladogram can be seen below:

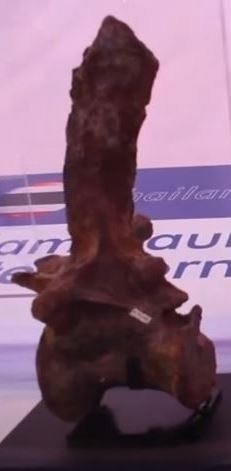
Vertebra from specimen SM-KK14, which may belong to Siamosaurus

- Spinosauridae
  - Praia das Aguncheiras taxon
  - Baryonychinae
    - Baryonyx walkeri
    - Suchomimus tenerensis
  - Spinosaurinae
    - Siamosaurus suteethorni
    - - Eumeralla taxon
      - - Ichthyovenator laosensis
        - - Irritator challengeri
          - Oxalaia quilombensis
          - Spinosaurini
            - Gara Samani taxon
            - Sigilmassasaurus brevicollis
            - Spinosaurus aegyptiacus

Later in 2019, the Khok Kruat Formation teeth were also referred to the Spinosaurinae by Kamonrak and colleagues, on the basis that both the Khok Kruat and Siamosaurus morphotypes lack characteristics seen in baryonychines, such as long and slender roots, 0–10 flutes on each side, no well defined carinae, a sculptured surface of the crown base, and 45 degree orientation of the blood grooves. But they share with spinosaurines a sub-circular to oval cross-section, fluted tooth crowns, well defined front and rear carinae, distinct striations on the crown, varying denticle size, and a wrinkled surface of the crown base. The authors also noted that unlike spinosaurines such as Irritator and Spinosaurus, Asian spinosaurines usually have more laterally compressed tooth crowns, and wrinkles across more of the enamel surface. In 2020, a paper by British palaeontologist Robert Smyth and colleagues considered S. suteethorni a dubious name and attributed its teeth to an indeterminate spinosaurine, given the uncertainties of classifying spinosaurid teeth at the genus or species level, as well as the degree of heterodonty (variation within the tooth row) that spinosaurines apparently exhibited. Due to new discoveries and research on spinosaurid teeth since Siamosaurus was named in 1986, a reassessment of the genus' validity is currently being prepared by Buffetaut. In a 2025 paper describing indeterminate spinosaurid teeth from the Sao Khua Formation which likely belongs to a distinct taxon, Puntanon, Suteethorn and Samathi supported the validity of Siamosaurus based on possibly diagnostic, plesiomorphic traits shared with members of Spinosaurinae, including small distal denticles and reduced tooth crown curvature.

== Palaeobiology ==
=== Diet and feeding ===
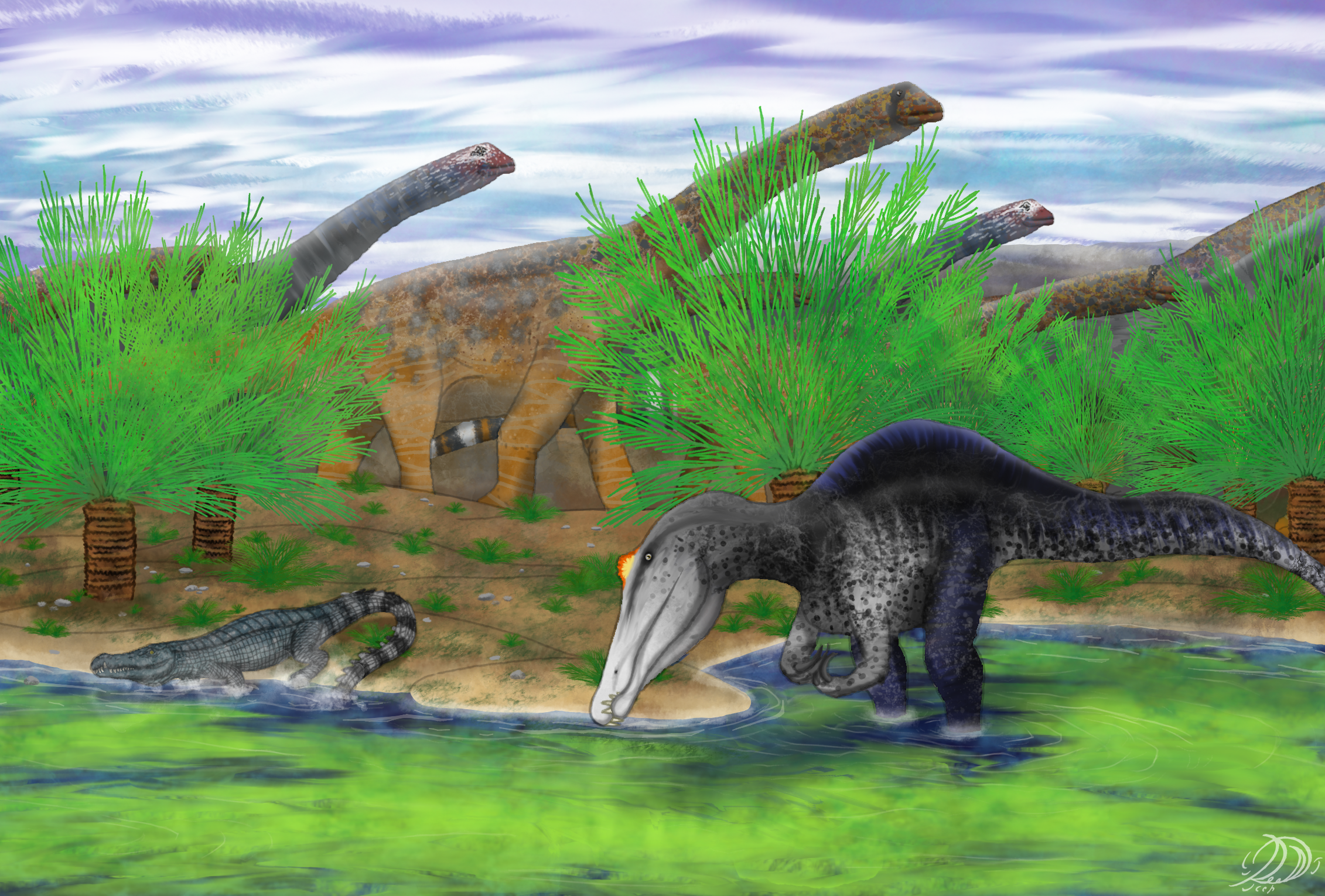
Speculative life restoration of Siamosaurus (right) in the Sao Khua Formation environment, with the goniopholidid Sunosuchus (middle left) and a herd of the sauropods Phuwiangosaurus in the background

Buffetaut and Ingavat suggested in 1986 that Siamosaurus probably led a heavily piscivorous (fish-eating) lifestyle, since its dentition—like those of other spinosaurids—had a highly specialised morphology better suited for piercing rather than tearing flesh, due to the long, straight conical tooth crowns with reduced or absent serrations. The authors noted that this dental morphology is also seen in other piscivorous predators like plesiosaurs and long-snouted crocodilians. Such a dietary preference had been suggested for Baryonyx the same year by British palaeontologists Angela Milner and Alan Charig, and was later confirmed in 1997 with the discovery of acid-etched fish scales inside the body cavity of its holotype skeleton. The elongate, interlocking jaws of spinosaurids also had snout tips that fanned out into a rosette-like shape—a trait also observed in highly piscivorous crocodilians such as gharials—which made them well-adapted to catching and feeding on fish. Fossil evidence has shown that besides aquatic prey, spinosaurids also consumed other dinosaurs and pterosaurs. In the Sao Khua Formation, localities such as Wat Sakawan have yielded sauropod remains in association with tooth crowns from Siamosaurus, documenting either predation or scavenging on part of the latter.

Annotated skull diagram of the related Spinosaurus

In 2006, Thai biologist Komsorn Lauprasert examined fossils collected from the Phu Kradung, Sao Khua, and Khok Kruat Formations. In this study, the teeth of Siamosaurus and a Moroccan spinosaurid were compared to those of crocodilians using scanning electron microscopy. Lauprasert found that spinosaurids and crocodilians may have employed similar feeding tactics and been under comparable mechanical constraints, based on resemblances in the microstructure of their tooth enamel. Therefore, Lauprasert suggested that Siamosaurus—as a piscivorous predator—could have replaced the ecological niche of contemporaneous long-snouted crocodilians. He noted that this likely occurred in correlation with the rising aridity of the Sao Khua and Khok Kruat Formations during the Early Cretaceous, since Siamosaurus had better mobility in a dry environment than crocodilians did. This might explain the absence of long-snouted crocodilian fossils from that time and place. Goniopholidid crocodilians were prevalent, however, and since this group had broader, shorter snouts and thus more varied diets, Lauprasert suggested that this would have kept them from competing with Siamosaurus. A similar scenario was proposed for spinosaurids by Hone and colleagues in 2010, who also noted that compared to large crocodilians and obligate aquatic predators, they could more easily travel from one body of water to another in search of prey.

=== Aquatic habits ===
In 2008, French palaeontologist Romain Amiot and colleagues compared the oxygen isotope ratios of remains from theropod and sauropod dinosaurs, crocodilians, turtles, and freshwater fish recovered from eight localities in northeastern Thailand. The study revealed that Siamosaurus teeth had isotope ratios closer to those of crocodilians and freshwater turtles than other theropods, and so it may have had semiaquatic habits similar to these animals, spending much of its daily life near or in water. Discrepancies between the ratios of sauropods, Siamosaurus, and other theropods also indicate these dinosaurs drank from different sources, whether river, pond, or plant water. In 2010, Amiot and colleagues published another oxygen isotope study on turtle, crocodilian, spinosaurid, other theropod remains, this time including fossils from Thailand, China, England, Brazil, Tunisia, and Morocco. The analysis showed that Thai spinosaurid teeth tended to have the largest difference from the ratios of other, more terrestrial theropods, while those of Spinosaurus from Tunisia and Morocco tended to have the least difference, despite the advanced piscivorous adaptations in the skull observed for this genus. The authors suggested that piscivory and semiaquatic habits may explain how spinosaurids coexisted with other large theropods. By feeding on different prey items and occupying a distinct ecological role, a phenomenon that is known as niche partitioning, the different types of theropods would have been out of direct competition. Further lines of evidence have since demonstrated that spinosaurids, especially those within the Spinosaurinae, developed strong adaptations for aquatic environments, such as dense limb bones for buoyancy control; reduction of the pelvic girdle; and elongated neural spines on the tail, likely used for underwater propulsion.

== Palaeoenvironment and palaeobiogeography ==
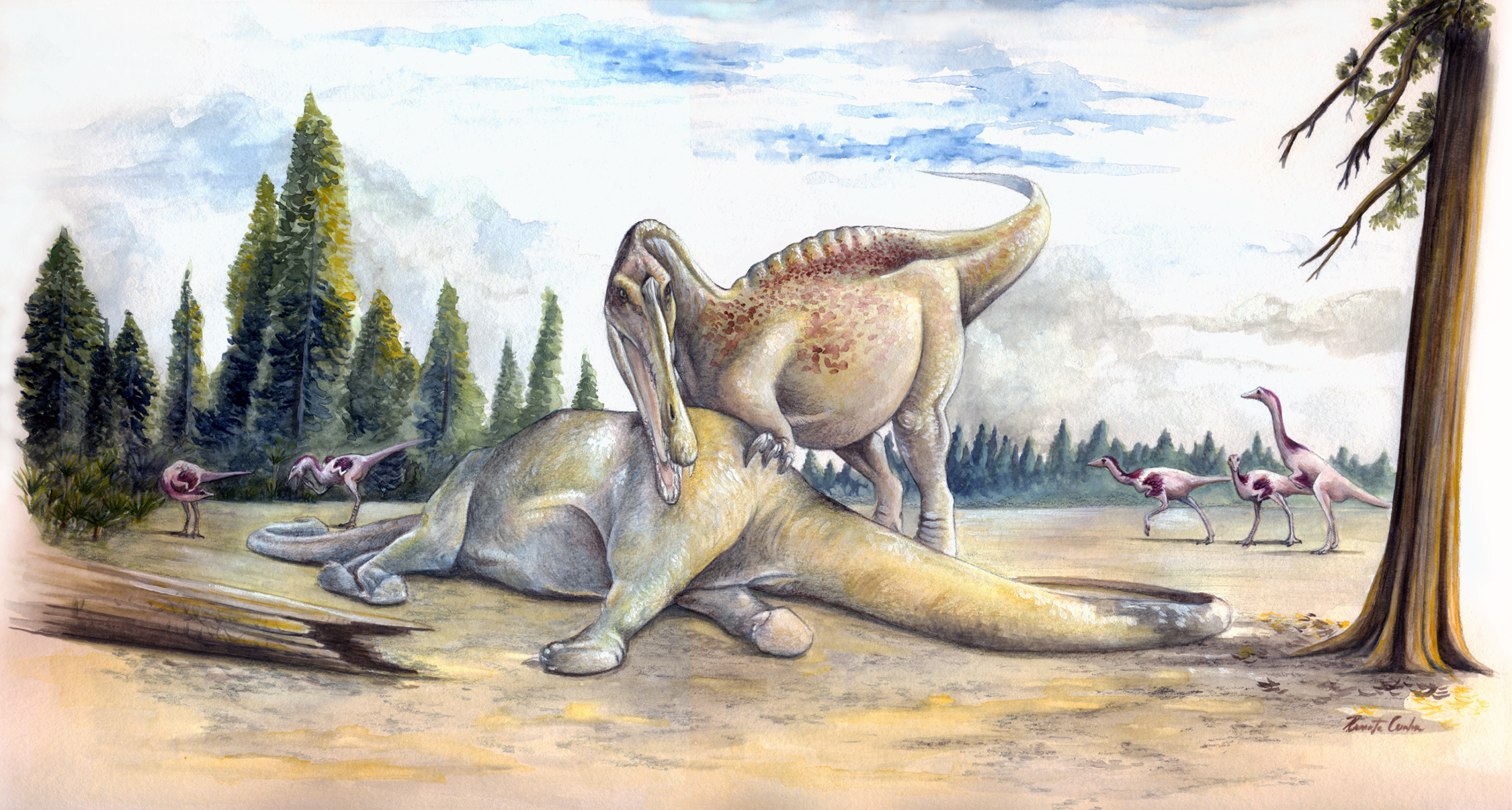
Restoration of a generic spinosaur feeding on a sauropod carcass in the Sao Khua Formation environment, a behavior hypothesized based on teeth belonging to Siamosaurus. The ornithomimosaurs in the background are Kinnareemimus.

Of all the Mesozoic formations in northeastern Thailand, the Sao Khua is the most abundant and diverse in vertebrate fossil discoveries. The Khorat Group yields fossil taxa only of continental origin, with no definitive evidence for marine fossils or sedimentary structures found so far. In 1963, Yoshitsugu Kobayashi of Hokkaido University reported ichthyosaur and plesiosaur teeth from the Sao Khua Formation, but these have now been identified as belonging to Siamosaurus and a crocodilian respectively. The sediments of the Sao Khua Formation, which comprise red clays, mudstones, sandstones, siltstones, and conglomerate rocks, record a fluvial environment dominated by lakes, floodplains, and meandering low-energy rivers. This is consistent with the types of vertebrate fauna present in the formation, which comprise only terrestrial or freshwater animals.

Besides Siamosaurus, there were theropod dinosaurs like the metriacanthosaurid Siamotyrannus, the ornithomimosaur Kinnareemimus, the megaraptoran Phuwiangvenator, the basal coelurosaur Vayuraptor, a compsognathid theropod, and indeterminate birds. Theropod eggs with embryos have also been recovered from the formation. There were also sauropods like the titanosauriform Phuwiangosaurus, mamenchisaurids, and indeterminate forms. Sauropod remains are some of the most abundant in the Sao Khua and Khok Kruat Formations. No ornithischian (or "bird-hipped") dinosaur fossils have been found in the Sao Khua Formation, possibly suggesting that they were uncommon compared to saurischian (or "lizard-hipped") dinosaurs. The faunal assemblage also included indeterminate pterosaurs; carettochelyid, adocid, and softshell turtles; hybodont sharks like hybodontids, ptychodontids, and lonchidiids; pycnodontiform fish; ray-finned fishes such as sinamiids and semionotids; and the goniopholidid crocodyliforms Sunosuchus, Siamosuchus, and Theriosuchus. The Sao Khua and Khok Kruat Formations had a more semi-arid climate than the older, more humid Phu Kradung Formation, dated to the Berriasian.

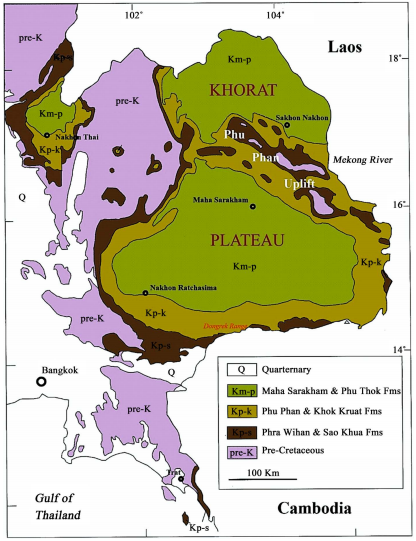
Geological map of the Khorat Plateau in northeast Thailand

The Khok Kruat Formation is composed mostly of sandstones, conglomerates, siltstones, and shales. Similar to the Sao Khua Formation, the deposition of these sediments occurred in an arid to semi-arid floodplain environment of slow-moving, meandering rivers. This ecosystem included pterosaurs, sinamiid fish; carettochelyid and acocid turtles; ptychodontid, hybodontid, and thaiodontid sharks; and the crocodyliform Khoratosuchus, as well as goniopholidids. Besides Siamosaurus, the dinosaur fauna of the Khok Kruat Formation included the carcharodontosaurid Siamraptor; iguanodontians like Sirindhorna, Ratchasimasaurus, and Siamodon; a titanosauriform sauropod similar to Phuwiangosaurus; an indeterminate ceratopsian; and various indeterminate theropods. The formation is probably equivalent to the Grès supérieurs Formation of Laos, since animals like spinosaurids, sauropods, and derived ("advanced") iguanodontians have also been found there.

In 2007, Milner and colleagues suggested that spinosaurids and iguanodontians may have spread from western to eastern Laurasia—the northern supercontinent at the time—during the Aptian, based on their distribution and presence in the Khok Kruat Formation. American palaeontologist Stephen Brusatte and colleagues noted in 2010 that the discovery of spinosaurids in Asia, a family previously known only from Europe, Africa, and South America, suggests a faunal interchange between Laurasia and Gondwana (in the south) during the early Late Cretaceous. Though it may also be possible that spinosaurids already had a cosmopolitan distribution before the Middle Cretaceous, preceding the breakup of Laurasia from Gondwana. However, the authors noted that more evidence is needed to test this hypothesis. In 2012, Allain and colleagues suggested such a global distribution may have occurred earlier across Pangaea before the Late Jurassic, even if Asia became separated from the supercontinent first. In 2019, Spanish palaeontologist Elisabete Malafaia and colleagues also indicated a complex biogeographical pattern for spinosaurs during the Early Cretaceous, based on anatomical similarities between Ichthyovenator and the European genus Vallibonavenatrix.
