= Varavudh Suteethorn =

Thai palaeontologist and geologist

- วราวุธ สุธีธร
- Born: 10 October 1948 (age 77); Nakhon Pathom, Thailand
- Other name: Warawut Suteethorn
- Education: Chiang Mai University; UPMC
- Known for: Discoveries in palaeontology in the Khorat Plateau
- Scientific career
- Fields: Vertebrate paleontology; Geology
- Workplaces: Mahasarakham University

Varavudh Suteethorn, or Warawut Suteethorn (Thai: วราวุธ สุธีธร; born 10 October 1948) is a Thai palaeontologist and geologist. He is the current director of the Palaeontological Research and Education Centre, Mahasarakham University. He is best known for his work on vertebrate paleontology in northeastern Thailand, having contributed to the discovery of many fossil taxa and dig sites in the Khorat Plateau, as part of a long-standing collaboration between Thai and French scientists.

== Biography ==
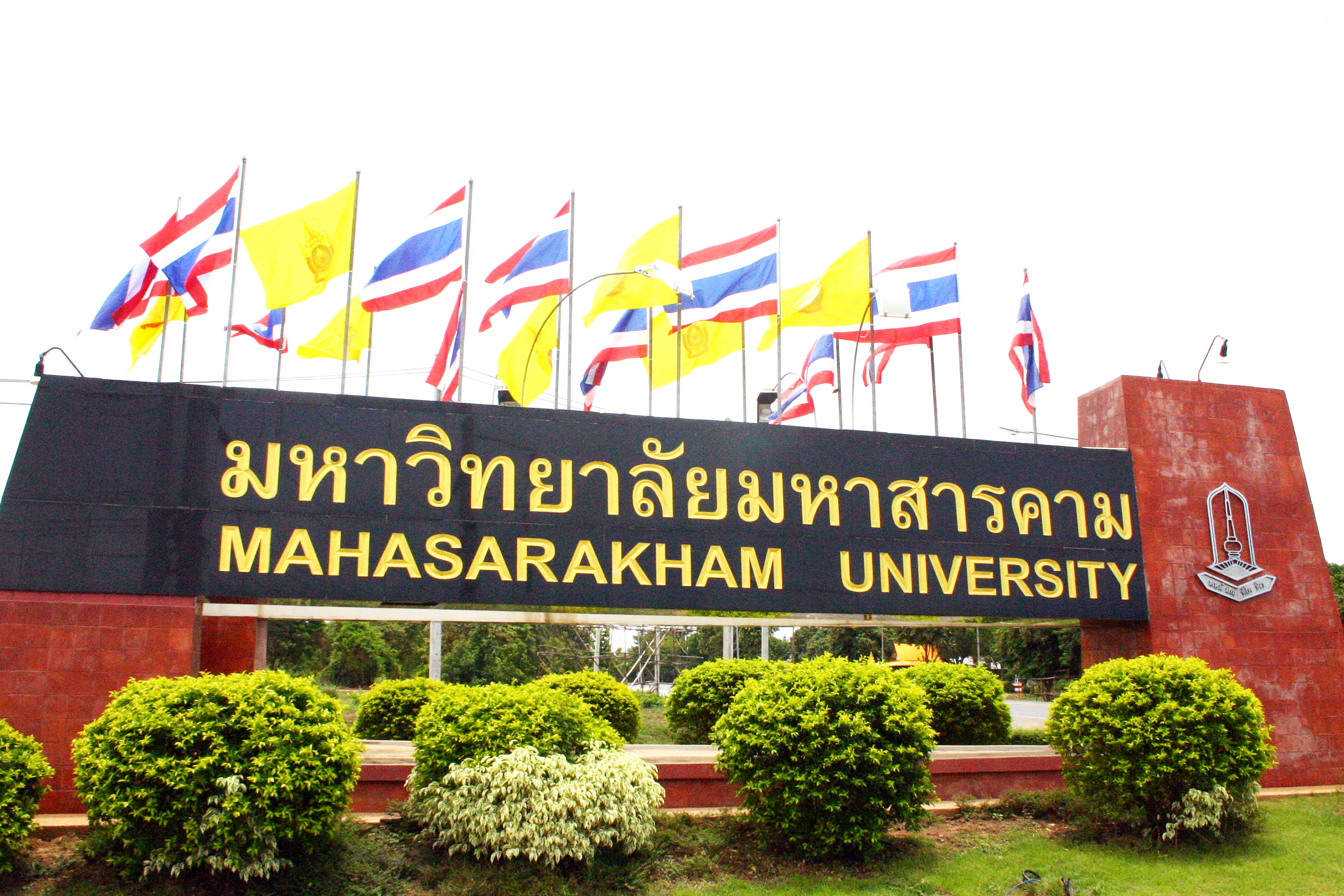
Mahasarakham University, Isan

Varavudh Suteethorn was born in the Nakhon Pathom Province of central Thailand on 10 October 1948. He obtained a bachelor's degree in geology from the Chiang Mai University in 1967, and started working at the Geological Survey Division of the Department of Mineral Resources (DMR) in 1974 as he began his career in geology. While working for the DMR, Suteethorn gained expertise on Thailand's northeastern Isan region, located in the Khorat Plateau. His geological mapping of those areas led to the discovery of various new fossil sites, which have since yielded the majority of Thailand's palaeontological discoveries.

Vertebrate palaeontology came into prominence in Thailand in 1980, when Thai geologists from the DMR cooperated with French scientists to begin expeditions in the Khorat Plateau. Suteethorn, one of the first members of the dinosaur expedition team, learned how to preparare and conserve fossils in France and Canada and in 1986 was granted a Certificate of Vertebrate Palaeontology by the University of Paris VI, France. The same year, the spinosaurid dinosaur species Siamosaurus suteethorni was named in honour of his palaeontological efforts in Thailand, by the French palaeontologist Éric Buffetaut and his Thai colleague Rucha Ingavat. Suteethorn has been head of the Thai dinosaur research team since 1992 and continues to find new dig sites, which are subject to cataloguing and routine checks from his team, although excavation has not begun in many of them.

In 2006 Suteethorn was given the Society of Vertebrate Paleontology's Skinner Award. In 2018, he received the Explorer Award from the National Geographic Society, during their annual Explorer's Festival. He is currently lecturer and director of the Palaeontological Research and Education Centre of Mahasarakham University.

== Taxa named by Suteethorn alone or with co-authors ==
Suteethorn has helped name and describe (often in cooperation with Buffetaut) many fossil vertebrates from the Khorat Plateau, including extinct dinosaurs, fish, crocodylomorphs, mammals, and turtles. His team from the Mahasarakham University discovered various fossil mammals in a Chaiyaphum cave, including teeth from pandas, hyenas, and the extinct orangutan Khoratpithecus piriyai.

=== Dinosaurs ===
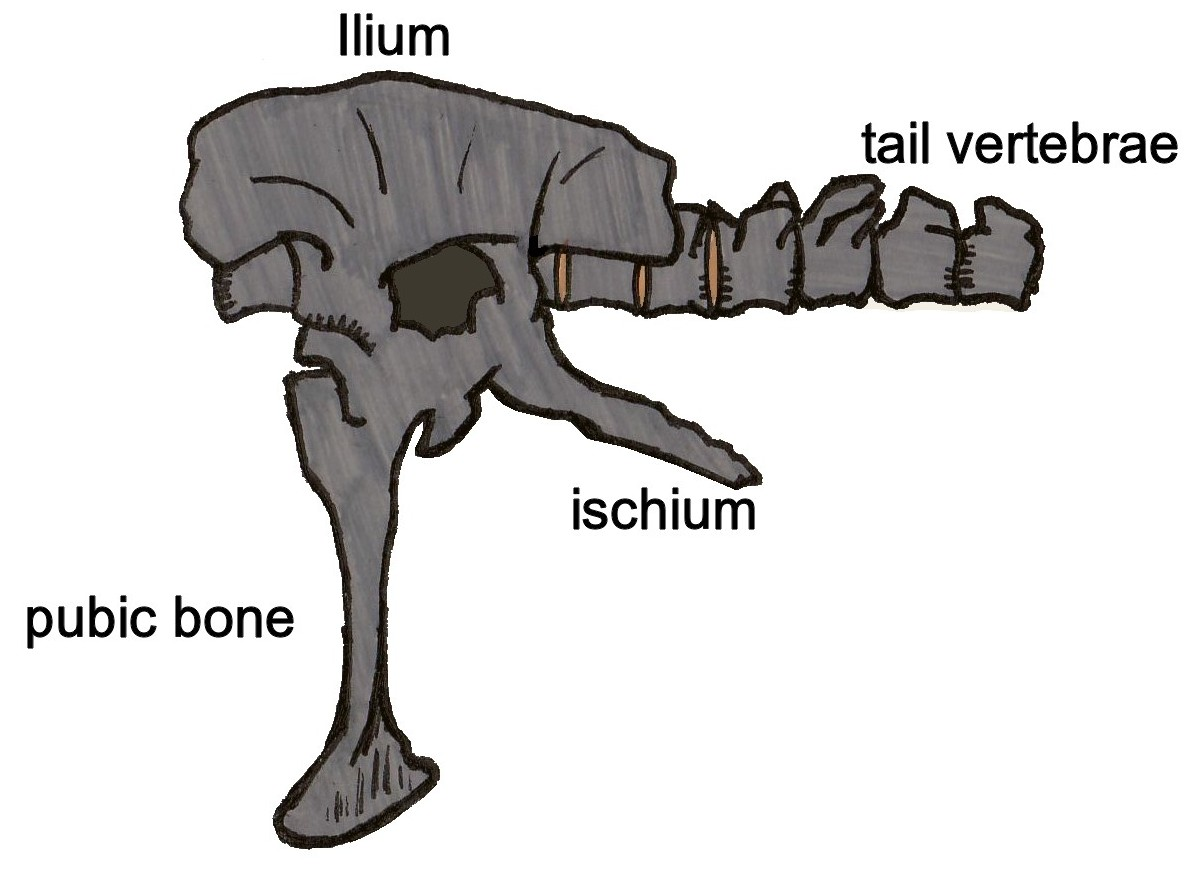
Illustrated pelvic bones and caudal vertebrae of Siamotyrannus isanensis

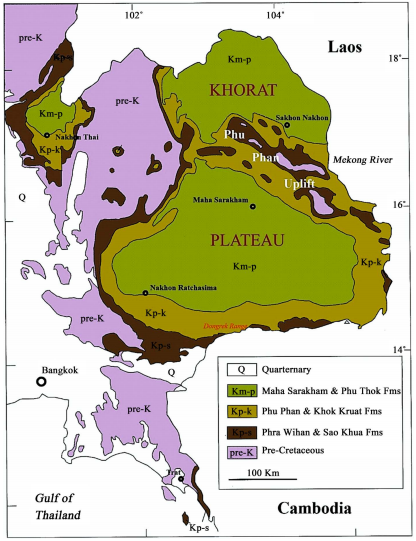
Map of the Khorat Plateau in northeast Thailand and the various geological formations it is composed of

- Siamotyrannus isanensis, in 1996 interpreted as the earliest known tyrannosaurid, before being reclassified in 2012 as a metriacanthosaurid.
- Phuwiangosaurus sirindhornae
- A possible new Psittacosaurus species, P. sattayaraki.
- Isanosaurus attavipachi, the earliest known sauropod dinosaur.
- Kinnareemimus khonkaenensis
- Siamodon nimngami
- Uragasaurus kalasinensis

=== Fish ===
- Lepidotes buddhabutrensis
- Acrorhizodus khoratensis
- Two species of Isanodus, I. nongbualamphuensis and I. paladeji.
- Two species of Isanichthys, I. palustris and I. lertboosi
- Lonchidion khoratensis
- Siamamia naga
- Ferganoceratodus martini
- Mukdahanodus trisivakulii
- Acrodus kalasinensis
- Thaiichthys

=== Crocodylomorphs ===
- Khoratosuchus jintasakuli
- Theriosuchus grandinaris
- Chalawan thailandicus

=== Primates ===
- Siamopithecus eocaenus
- Khoratpithecus piriyai

=== Turtles ===
- A new species of Cuora, C. chiangmuanensis
- Phunoichelys thirakhupti

=== Coral ===
- Caninophyllum somtaiense
