= Phu Wiang (disambiguation) =

Phu Wiang is a locality in Thailand's Khon Kaen Province named after its main feature, the Phu Wiang mountains. The name may also refer to:

- Phu Wiang District, the district previously surrounding the area
- Wiang Kao District, the original population centre split off from (new) Phu Wiang District
- Phu Wiang Dinosaur Museum
- Phu Wiang National Park
