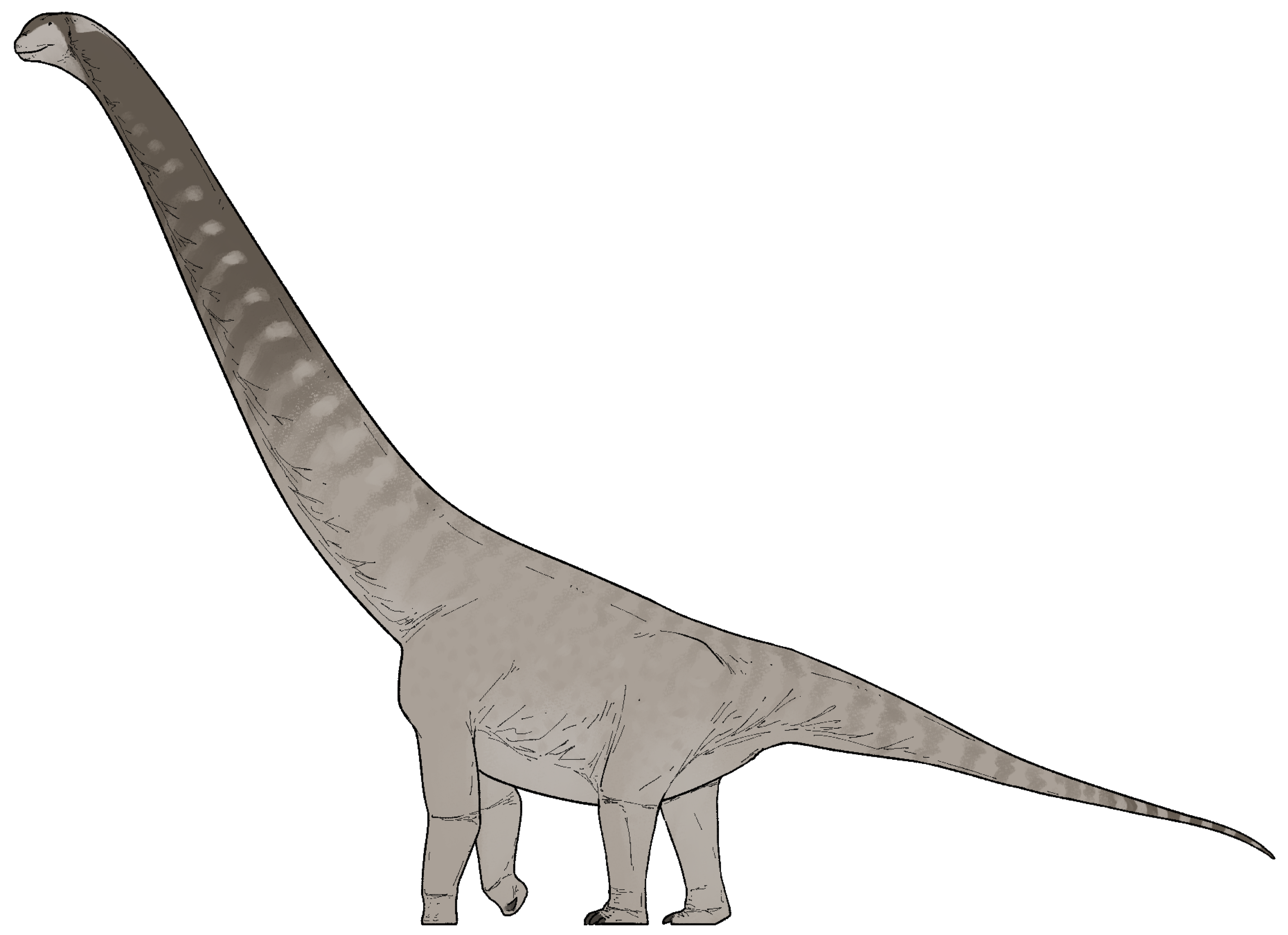
- Life restoration

Scientific classification
- Kingdom: Animalia
- Phylum: Chordata
- Class: Reptilia
- Clade: Dinosauria
- Clade: Saurischia
- Clade: †Sauropodomorpha
- Clade: †Sauropoda
- Clade: †Macronaria
- Family: †Euhelopodidae
- Genus: †Nagatitan; Sethapanichsakul et al., 2026
- Species: †N. chaiyaphumensis

Binomial name
- †Nagatitan chaiyaphumensis Sethapanichsakul et al., 2026

= Nagatitan =

Nagatitan Temporal range: late Early Cretaceous, Aptian–Albian

Genus of sauropod dinosaur

Nagatitan (lit. 'Nāga giant') is an extinct genus of euhelopodid sauropod dinosaur known from the Early Cretaceous (Aptian–Albian ages) Khok Kruat Formation of Thailand. The genus contains a single species, Nagatitan chaiyaphumensis, known from a partial skeleton. Nagatitan is a large sauropod, with an estimated body length of 27 metres (89 ft) and mass of approximately 27 tonnes (30 short tons), making it the largest dinosaur known from Southeast Asia.

== Discovery and naming ==
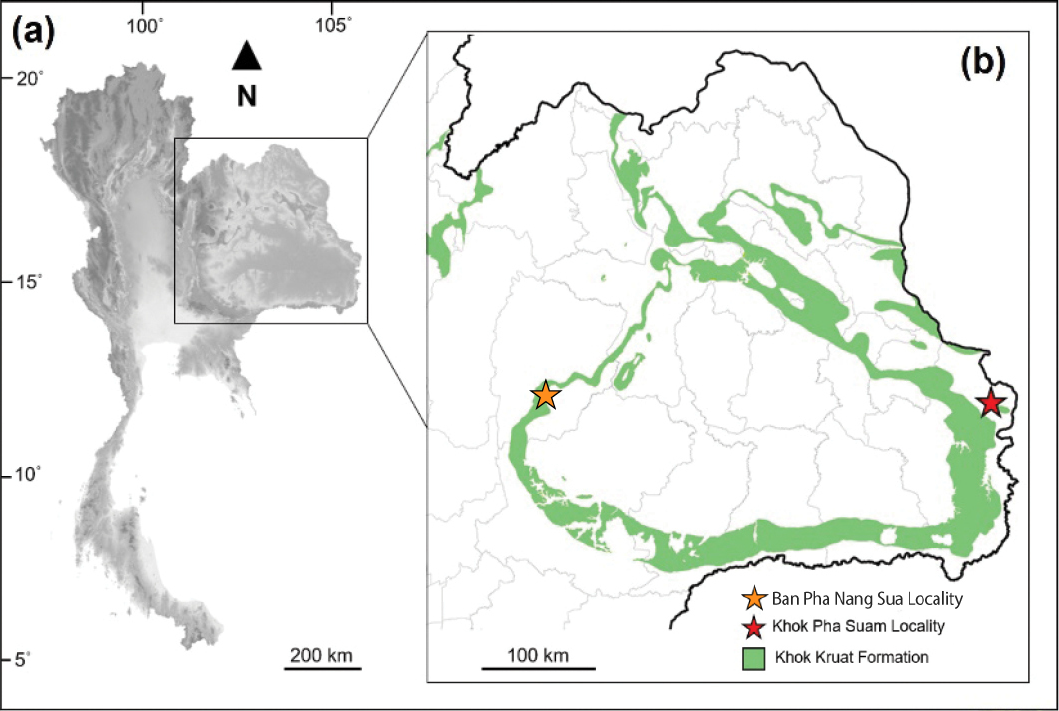
Location of the Ban Pha Nang Sua locality (orange star) in Thailand

The Nagatitan fossil material was discovered in outcrops of the Khok Kruat Formation in Chaiyaphum province, Thailand by Thanom Luangnan on the bank of a pond in 2016. The specimen is housed in the Sirindhorn Museum, where it is permanently accessioned as specimens SM2025-1-546 to SM2025-1-556. The specimen consists of several vertebrae, parts of the pelvis, and parts of the forelimb and hindlimb.

In 2026, Thitiwoot Sethapanichsakul and colleagues described Nagatitan chaiyaphumensis as a new genus and species of sauropod dinosaur based on these fossil remains, establishing SM2025-1-546–556 as the holotype specimen. The generic name, Nagatitan, combines a reference to the mythical serpetine Nāga in Asian cultures, with the word "titan" (lit. 'giant'), a common suffix for sauropod names, referencing the pre-Olympian gods of Greek mythology. The specific name, chaiyaphumensis, references the discovery of the species in Chaiyaphum, Thailand.

== Description ==
Size compared to a human

To estimate the body mass and overall body length of Nagatitan, Sethapanichsakul et al. (2026) used calculations derived from measurements of the bones. The body mass was calculated using the minimum shaft circumference of the humerus (58.4 cm (23.0 in)) and femur (68.2 cm (26.9 in)), yielding a mass of 26,582 kilograms (58,603 lb). The overall body length was calculated at about 27.2 metres (89 ft).

== Classification ==
To test the affinities and relationships of Nagatitan, Sethapanichsakul and colleagues (2026) included it in an expanded version of the phylogenetic matrix of Díez Díaz et al. (2025). Using both equal character weighting and (b) extended implied weighting, Nagatitan was recovered within the somphospondylan titanosauriform family Euhelopodidae. Using equal weighting, it was placed as the sister taxon to Europatitan—a European taxon not generally regarded as a member of this otherwise Asian clade—at the base of Euhelopodidae. Using implied weighting, Europatitan shifted outside of this clade, while Nagatitan was placed in a more euhelopodid derived position, diverging after Tangvayosaurus but before Phuwiangosaurus. The results of the latter analysis are displayed in the cladogram below:

- Euhelopodidae
  - Gobititan
  - Huanghetitan ruyangensis
  - - Tangvayosaurus
    - - Nagatitan
      - - Phuwiangosaurus
        - - Qiaowanlong
          - - Euhelopus
            - Yongjinglong

== Paleobiology ==
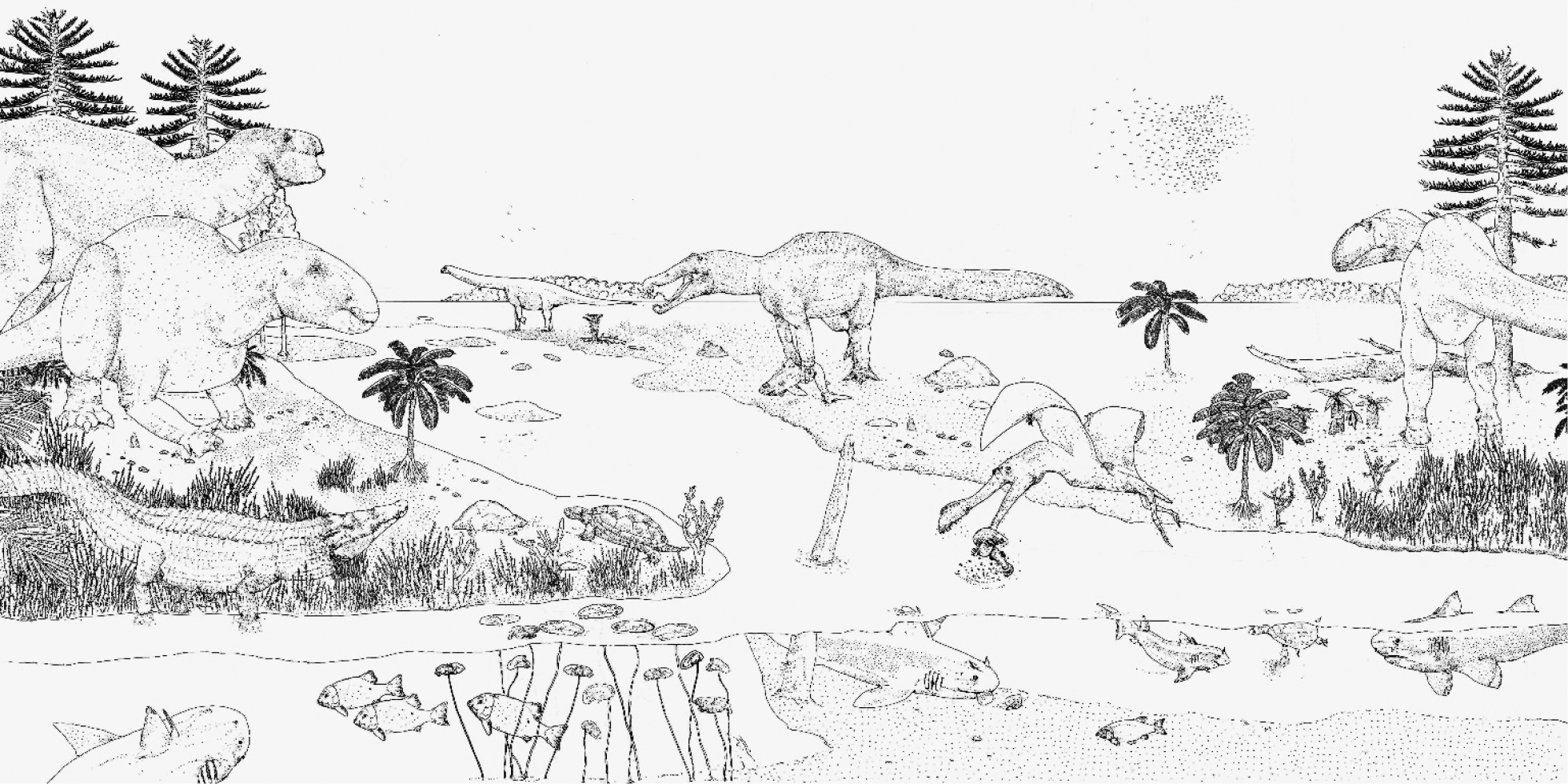
Paleoenvironmental reconstruction of the Khok Kraut Formation (Khok Pha Suam locality)

Nagatitan is known from the Khok Kraut Formation, which dates to the Aptian to Albian ages of the end of the Early Cretaceous. Many other dinosaurs have been described from this formation, including indeterminate (unnamed) titanosauriforms, the ornithopods Ratchasimasaurus, Siamodon, and Sirindhorna, the early ceratopsian Psittacosaurus sattayaraki, the carcharodontosaurian Siamraptor, and indeterminate spinosaurid bones. Non-dinosaurian taxa from this region include the crocodyliform Khoratosuchus, in addition to remains of a pterodactyloid pterosaur, adocid and carettochelyid turtles, and halecomorph, ginglymodian, and hybodontiform fishes. Outcrops of the Grès Supérieurs Formation in Laos are considered to be equivalent to those of the Khok Kruat Formation, and have yielded dinosaurs including the titanosauriform Tangvayosaurus, the ornithopod Mandschurosaurus, and the spinosaurid Ichthyovenator.
