= Phu Wiang Dinosaur Museum =

Geological museum with fossil exhibits

Coordinates: 16°40′42″N 102°16′01″E

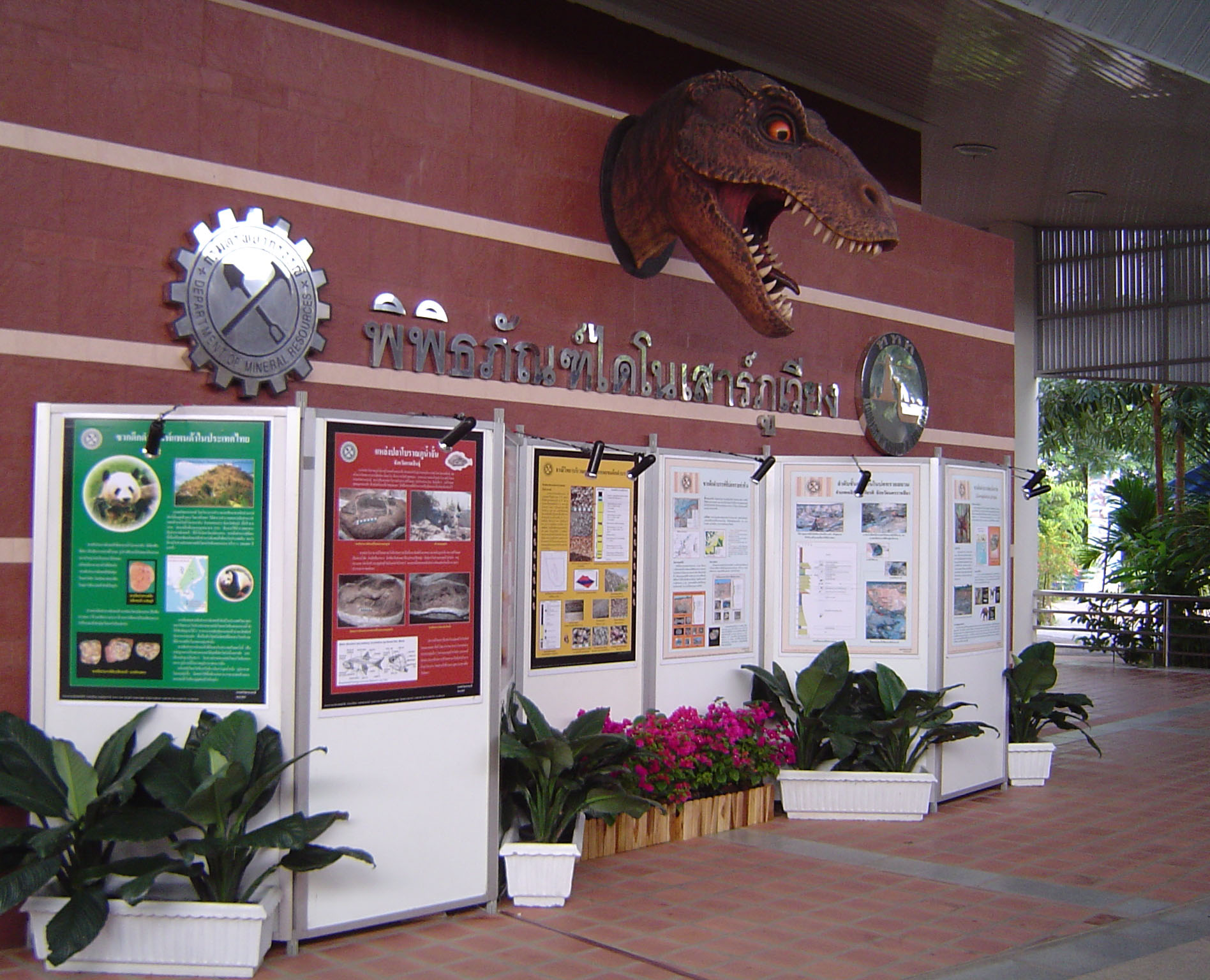
Service space in the front of the Phu Wiang Dinosaur Museum

Phu Wiang Dinosaur Museum (Thai: พิพิธภัณฑ์ไดโนเสาร์ภูเวียง) is a geological museum mainly exhibiting fossils. It is under the administration of the Department of Mineral Resources, Ministry of Natural Resources and Environment, of the Royal Thai Government, and situated in the Khok Sanambin public area in Tambon Nai Muang, Wiang Kao district, Khon Kaen province in the northeastern region of Thailand. The museum was constructed with a budget from the Tourism Authority of Thailand under the supervision of the Department of Mineral Resources and comprises an area of 40 acres (160,000 m^{2}). It has been open to the public since 2009.

== Background ==
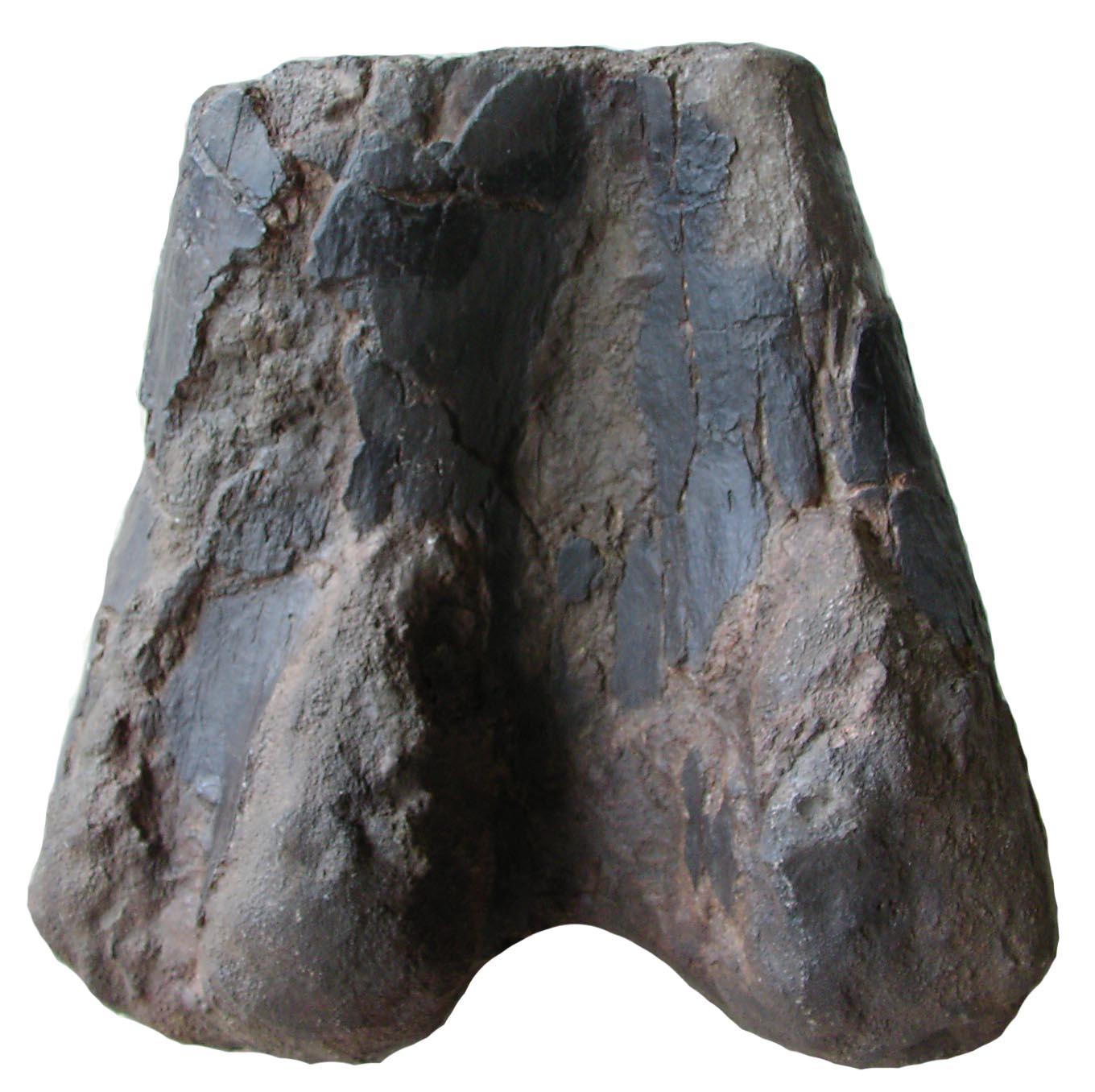
Distal part of a left femur of a sauropod dinosaur regarded as the first dinosaur discovery of Thailand

Dinosaur fossils were first discovered in Thailand during mineral exploration in the Phu Wiang area of Khon Kaen province. In 1976 Sudham Yaemniyom, a geologist, discovered a piece of bone on a streambed, Huai Pratu Tima, which was later identified as a distal part of the left femur of a sauropod dinosaur, regarded as the first dinosaur discovery of Thailand.

Since 1976, the Department of Mineral Resources, together with the Thai-French Paleontological Project, investigated the dinosaurs in the Phu Wiang mountains. The project found many vertebrae, teeth, and dinosaur footprints mainly from sandstone of the Early Cretaceous Sao Khua Formation (about 130 million years old), including sauropod and theropod, with a wide range of sizes, from a hen up to a large dinosaur with about 15 meters long. These finds led Thai people to visit the dinosaur sites, and Princess Maha Chakri Sirindhorn visited Site 2 on 3 November 1989. She also revisited the site, viewing Site 3 and the Phu Wiang Dinosaur Museum, with the committees of the Prince Mahidol International Award, of the Prince Mahidol Award Foundation, on 25 October 2008.

== Site development ==
After Phu Wiang National Park was established in 1991, the Khon Kaen province and Phu Wiang district administrations, the Tourism Authority of Thailand, Department of Mineral Resources, and other government agencies recognized the importance of the dinosaur sites in the national park. Consequently, the Tourism Authority was allocated a budget to develop four dinosaur sites, namely Site 1, Site 2, Site 3, and Site 9, by constructing small buildings covering the sites to protect the dinosaur bones from disturbances, together with walking trails connecting the sites.

== Museum origin ==
Discovery of the dinosaurs on the Phu Wiang mountains, especially the sauropod dinosaur Phuwiangosaurus sirindhornae, named after Princess Maha Chakri Sirindhorn, was regarded as important and raised awareness of the Phu Wiang mountains. Some government agencies agreed that it was appropriate to build the Phu Wiang Dinosaur Museum and chose the Khok Sanambin public area with an area of 40 acres (160,000 m^{2}) as the place of construction with a budget from the Tourism Authority of Thailand, to the size of 5,500 square meters. The Department of Mineral Resources was delegated to look after and administer the site by establishing a permanent exhibition and opening it to the public in 2001.

== Museum composition ==
The Phu Wiang Dinosaur Museum houses activities including a research and investigation section, fossil replication and conservation, a fossil collection house, library, permanent exhibition, administration office, and service space such as a canteen, souvenir shop, snack and drinks shop, car parking space, and a 140-person capacity auditorium.

The Phu Wiang Dinosaur Museum is a geological learning source for pupils and students from many educational institutes and other agencies, including educational promotion foundations.

== Dinosaurs from Phu Wiang ==
- Phuwiangosaurus sirindhornae
- Siamosaurus suteethorni
- Siamotyrannus isanensis
- Kinnareemimus khonkaenensis

== Accessibility ==
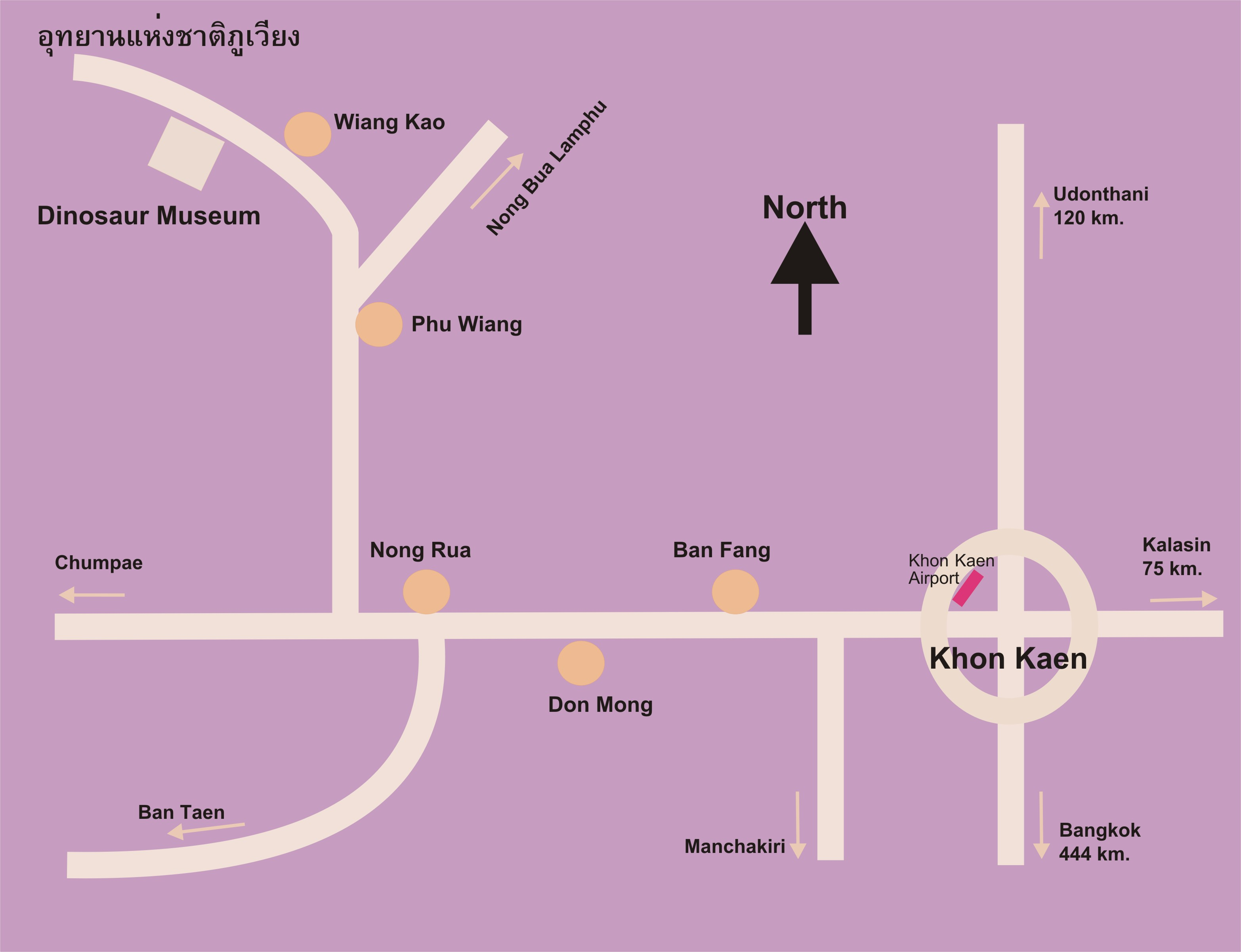
Simple route map showing the ways from Khon Kaen city to the Phu Wiang Dinosaur Museum

The word "Phu Wiang" in the name of the museum results from the fact that the museum used to be located in the Phu Wiang District, though since 2006 it is located in the newly established Wiang Kao district. It is about 80 kilometers to the west of the province capital Khon Kaen.
