= Geology of Thailand =

The geology of Thailand includes deep crystalline metamorphic basement rocks, overlain by extensive sandstone, limestone, turbidites and some volcanic rocks. The region experienced complicated tectonics during the Paleozoic, long-running shallow water conditions and then renewed uplift and erosion in the past several million years ago.

== Geologic history, stratigraphy and tectonics ==
Medium- and high-grade metamorphic rocks form the basement of Thailand and geologists have debated based on radiometric dating whether metamorphism took place during the Precambrian or Mesozoic (if during the Mesozoic, it likely overprinted and recrystallized older rocks). In the northwest, many rocks near Chiang Mai and Kanchanaburi are metamorphosed to amphibolite or epidote grade on the sequence of metamorphic facies. The region has a paragneiss-schist and anatectic-migmatic sequence.

=== Paleozoic (539-251 million years ago) ===
Early Paleozoic rocks are only known in western Thailand, such as sandstones on Tarutao Island in the Andaman Sea with Cambrian and Ordovician trilobite fossils. Together with non-fossil bearing strata on the mainland, they make up the Tarutao Group. Primarily sandstones, some make direct contact visible at the surface with underlying gneiss.

Limestone commonly deposited in the Ordovician and Silurian, forming the Thung Song Group, with a large component of argillite in the upper and lower part of the group. There is also a shale horizon called the Ban Na Shale, interbedded with Ordovician limestone. The presence of shale suggests a deeper water environment in the Silurian. The Thong Pha Phum Group conformably overlies the Thung Song Group in the west with a thick sequence of non-fossil bearing clastic marine sedimentary rocks that likely deposited in a forearc basin. Volcanic activity was common in the Devonian and Carboniferous as limestone accumulated on a western facing continental margin (exposures of these rocks are visible at Petchabun-Loei in east-central Thailand).

Carboniferous and Permian turbidite sequences overlie these groups in south, west and central Thailand. Thick sequences of clastic sediment in the Kaeng Krachan Formation extends from the center-west into Myanmar. Some geologists have interpreted pebbly diamictite mudstone and turbidites in the Mergui Group as glacial sediments, with possible origin in India or northwest Australia. One interpretation holds that the Mergui Group was thrust on top of the Shan-Thai Block from the west during the Mesozoic, forming a nappe. Extensional tectonics in the north led to mafic volcanic activity within the Shan-Thai Block in the Carboniferous, continuing into the Permian. Some red beds also formed during the same period.

During the Permian, almost the entire region was submerged during a major marine transgression. Carbonates deposited in shallow, shelf seas and today form dramatic karst landscapes. The warm water Saraburi Group in the east has numerous fossils, while the Ratburi Group in the west does not. In peninsular Thailand, sandstone is predominant interfingered with Ratburi Group limestones. Along the western edge of the Khorat Plateau, a limestone dominated shelf sequence abuts turbidites and pyroclastic flow deposits. A magmatic arc around a west-dipping subduction zone produced intermediate and felsic volcanic rocks in the north around Lampang to the east of Chiang Mai.

=== Mesozoic (251-66 million years ago) ===
During the Triassic, a major marine transgression flooded Thailand. Conglomerate is common at the base of units from this time period, overlain by limestone that thickens to the westward. East of Chiang Mai, the Lampang Group has marine shale, sandstone, limestone and conglomerate three kilometers thick, overlain by an additional two kilometers of flysch. Geologists have interpreted it as shallow-water deposition in a forearc basin over a west-dipping subduction zone.

Marine conditions lasted into the Norian, or as late as the Jurassic in the west. The Mae Moei Group is a major limestone unit in the northwest equivalent to the Lampang Group with Jurassic strata at the top and overlain by Cretaceous red beds.

By contrast to the patterns of marine deposition, the Khorat Plateau in the northeast is underlain by Triassic-Cretaceous continental deposits. Offshore islands and the Cambodian border have numerous sandstones related to the plateau. With calc-alkaline volcanic rock at its base, the Khorat Plateau is diachronous giving the appearance that basin deposition moved further west through the Mesozoic. The Khorat Group is five kilometers thick in the northeast and holds occasional dinosaur, plant and bivalve fossils. Much of the deposition took place in a lake environment. The Khorat Group begins with 2.5 kilometers of red beds, overlain by light-colored sandstones, red beds and evaporites such as carnallite, tachyhydrite, halite and sylvite. The carnallite zone is up to 95 meters thick and the halite deposit is one of the thickest on Earth.

Thailand has intrusive granitoid everywhere but the Khorat Plateau. I- and S-type plutons are dominant along the border with Myanmar and extending to the Phuket Island. Typically, they are small and isolated with biotite and muscovite-rich granite as well as potassium feldspar megacrysts, hornblende and large mica-tourmaline or lepidolite pegmatites. S-type granites in this belt commonly have tin-tungsten mineralization. Triassic S-type granitoid batholiths, often associated with orthogneiss and migmatite, form a central belt in western Thailand the peninsula.

=== Cenozoic (66 million years ago-present) ===
Cenozoic sedimentary rocks are mainly found in low-lying areas in the north and west, but also at several areas in the south. In the north, graben formations filled with sediment two kilometers thick. For much of the Cenozoic, Thailand was comparatively flat until rapid uplift began in the north, accompanied by block faulting and horst and graben formation in the Pliocene and Pleistocene, leaving valley floors to fill with gravel and sand. Large quantities of natural gas and some petroleum have been found in the blended terrestrial and marine sedimentary strata along the Andaman Sea coast, ranging in age from Oligocene to Pliocene. Marine influence is modest and common later in the sequence, which is up to eight kilometers thick.

The Chao Paya Basin around Bangkok and Pitsanulok Basin in the north both have extensive Quaternary sedimentary cover from the last 2.5 million years. Based on aerial magnetic surveys and boreholes, geologists have inferred that the Chao Paya Basin is believed to be a composite graben with uneven underlying topography.

Throughout the Quaternary, as uplift continued sediments eroded off the rising highlands and deposited in low-lying areas. During the Pleistocene ice ages, the Gulf of Thailand resembled its present geography, although sea levels did rise and extend more than 100 kilometers north of Bangkok, leaving behind the 20 meter thick Bangkok Clay in the Holocene. An alkaline basalt province erupted across northern Thailand and into Cambodia and Vietnam, leaving behind small vents, plugs and flows.

== Natural resource geology ==
Thailand is a leading global producer of tin, almost exclusively from cassiterite. In a few locations, very small occurrences of malayaite and stannite—other examples of tin minerals—have been found.

Cassiterite is found in quartz veins, skarn deposits, aplite, pegmatite and greisenized granite intrusions, often with accessory minerals such as fluorite, muscovite, wolframite, columbite, tantalite, tourmaline, topaz, zircon and beryl. Sulfide minerals like chalcopyrite, pyrite, arsenopyrite, sphalerite, galena and bismuthinite are found in association with cassiterite in the north and south. Virtually all deposits display some form of hydrothermal formation. In the west and along the Malaysian border are tin-bearing granites. In fact, the Ranong-Phuket area near the Andaman Sea coast and the southern peninsula of Thailand produces 85 percent of its tin output. Onshore and offshore placer deposits are the key tin source.

Additionally, Thailand has some production of gypsum, limestone, kaolin, sapphire, zircon, tantalite, columbite, antimony, lead, zinc, barite and fluorite. Examples include Jurassic sandstones with copper-uranium mineralization or Ordovician limestones with lead-zinc sulfides. Onshore and offshore Cenozoic basins have lignite, oil shale and some petroleum.
