= Éric Buffetaut =

French paleontologist

- Born: 19 November 1950 (age 75); Porte-Joie, Normandy, France
- Education: Université de Paris
- Known for: Archosaur research
- Scientific career
- Fields: Paleontology
- Workplaces: Centre national de la recherche scientifique

Éric Buffetaut (born 19 November 1950) is a French paleontologist, author and researcher at the Centre national de la recherche scientifique since 1976 where he is a Doctor of Science and Director of Research. Buffetaut is a specialist of fossil archosaurs, mainly dinosaurs and pterosaurs, and has published many books on paleontology. He is one of the major paleontologists to support the thesis of the fall of a meteorite as the main cause of the Cretaceous–Paleogene extinction event.

== Notable works ==
Below is a list of taxa that Buffetaut has contributed to naming:

- Archaeodontosaurus descouensi (genus and species)
- Caletodraco cottardi (genus and species)
- Castignovolucris sebei (genus and species)
- Chalawan thailandicus (genus and species)
- Dolichochampsa minima (genus and species)
- Eogavialis africanum (genus)
- Euthecodon arambourgi (species)
- Hatzegopteryx thambema (genus and species)
- Isanosaurus attavipachi (genus and species)
- Isalorhynchus genovefae (genus and species)
- Kinnareemimus khonkaenensis (genus and species)
- Liubangosaurus hei (genus and species)
- Normanniasaurus genceyi (genus and species)
- Normannognathus wellnhoferi (genus and species)
- Ostafrikasaurus crassiserratus (genus and species)
- Phuwiangosaurus sirindhornae (genus and species)
- Psittacosaurus sattayaraki (species)
- Rhabdodon septimanicus (species, now in the genus Obelignathus)
- Siamamia naga (genus and species)
- Siamodon nimngami (genus and species)
- Siamosaurus suteethorni (genus and species)
- Siamotyrannus isanensis (genus and species)
- Tarascosaurus salluvicus (genus and species)
- Tilemsisuchus lavocati (genus and species)
- Trematochampsa taqueti (genus and species)
- Variraptor mechinorum (genus and species)

Buffetaut demonstrated in 1982 that Dakosaurus and Aggiosaurus are actually members of the Metriorhynchidae.

In 1997, the crocodylomorph Musturzabalsuchus buffetauti was named in his honor. In 2025, the ctenochasmatid pterosaur Garudapterus buffetauti was named in his honor.

Buffeataut works mainly with Mesozoic reptiles including crocodylomorphs, pterosaurs and dinosaurs.

== Selected publications ==
- Les Dinosaures. Que sais-je ? n°2827, PUF, 1994 ISBN 2130460038
- Les Dinosaures de France, avec Pascal Robin, BRGM Éditions 1995 ISBN 2715907664
- Histoire de la paléontologie. Que sais-je ? n°2190, PUF, avril 1997 ISBN 213048557X
- Les Mondes disparus, atlas de la dérive des continents, avec Jean Le Loeuff, Guy Le Roux, Berg International, 1998 ISBN 2911289145
- Dans les traces des dinosaures, Les Éditions Pocket ISBN 2266045709
- La Fin des dinosaures : comment les grandes extinctions ont façonné le monde vivant., Fayard, 2003 ISBN 221361489X
- Les Dinosaures. Collection "Idées reçues n°123. Éditions Le Cavalier Bleu, 2006 ISBN 2846701431
- Les dinosaures sont-ils un échec de l'évolution ?. Éditions du Pommier, 2008 ISBN 9782746503854
- Que nous racontent les fossiles ?, éditions du Pommier, 2009 ISBN 9782746504097
- Sommes-nous tous voués à disparaître ? idées reçues sur l'extinction des espèces, Éditions Le Cavalier Bleu, 2012, ISBN 9782846704342
- À la recherche des animaux mystérieux : idées reçues sur la cryptozoologie, Le Cavalier Bleu éditions, 2016, ISBN 9791031800998
