= Sirindhorn Museum =

Geology museum in northeast Thailand

Coordinates: 16°41′32″N 103°31′26″E

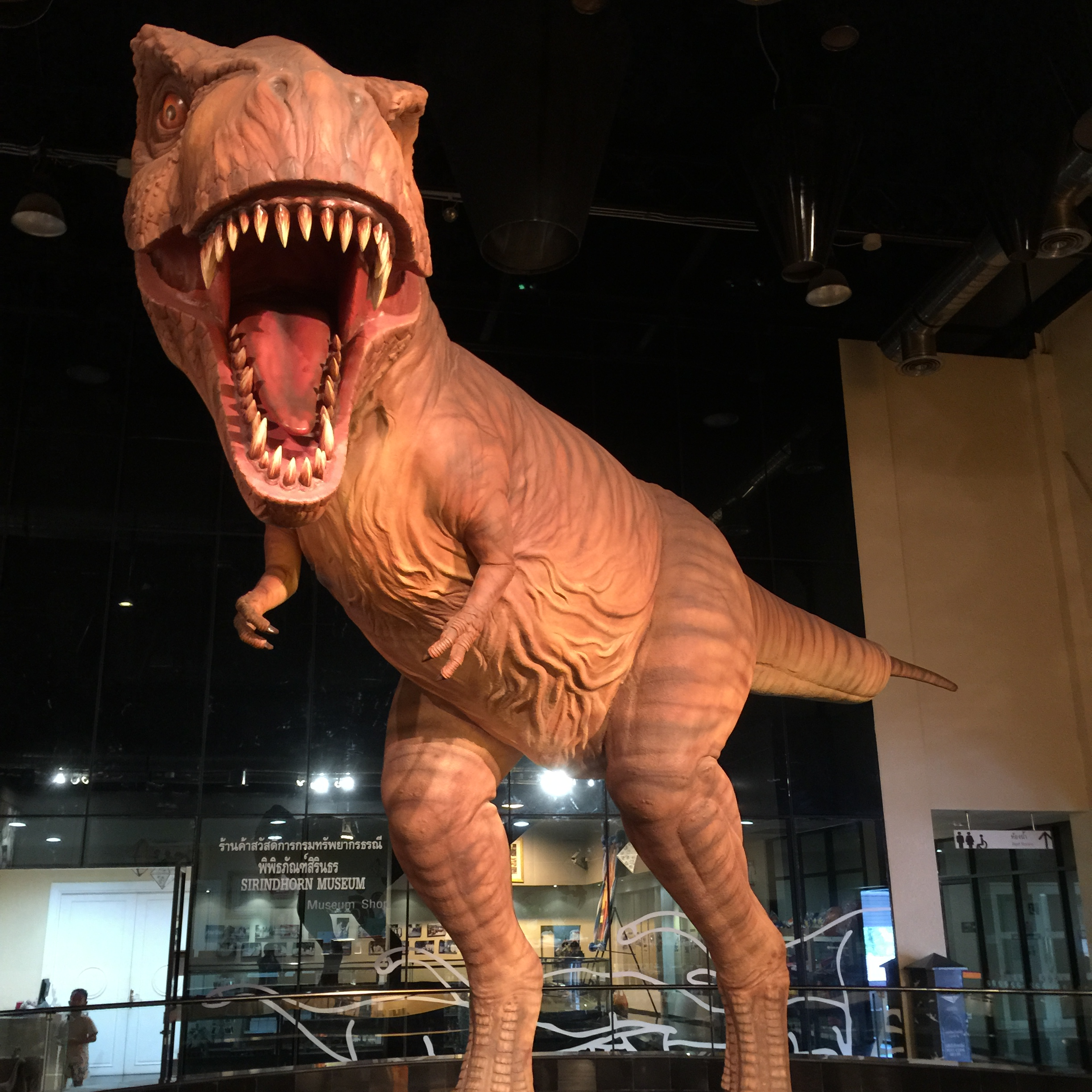
Dinosaur sculpture at the museum

Sirindhorn Museum (a.k.a. Sirindhorn Dinosaur Museum) (Thai: พิพิธภัณฑ์แหล่งขุดค้นไดโนเสาร์ ภูกุ้มข้าว) is a geology museum in northeast Thailand. It is located at Non Buri, Sahatsakhan district, Kalasin province.

== About ==
Dinosaur fossils were found by Phra Kru Vijitsahassakun, the abbot of Wat Sakawan, in 1994 at Phu Kum mountain (Phu Kum Khao) in his omen. During next year Department of Mineral Resources researchers excavated the fossils and found that this place is the largest herbivorous dinosaur site in Thailand; most of the fossils belonging to sauropods from 120 million years ago.

The museum project started in 1995. The museum was named after Princess Maha Chakri Sirindhorn, who presided over its opening ceremony in December 1998.

The museum is divided into 8 different exhibition zones. The Origin of the Earth and Universe; The Origin of the Living Things; Paleozoic Era; Mesozoic Era, Thai dinosaur; Dinosaurs in Thailand; Bring life to dinosaur; Cenozoic Era; Human being.
