= Phu Wiang =

Mountain range in Thailand

Coordinates: 16°45′N 102°15′E

Phu Wiang (Thai: ภูเวียง) is a short, relatively isolated mountain range in the Khorat Plateau of Northeastern Thailand, today within the area of Khon Kaen Province. It is best known as the site of the discovery of dinosaur fossils in Thailand, and is also home to ancient human settlements. The mountain, most of which is designated as Phu Wiang National Park, has two arms extending in a horseshoe shape, almost encircling a wide valley which is home to what used to be the old population centre of Phu Wiang District. In 2007, the valley area, which covers the old town as well as the paleontological digs and Phu Wiang Dinosaur Museum, was split off to form Wiang Kao District.
