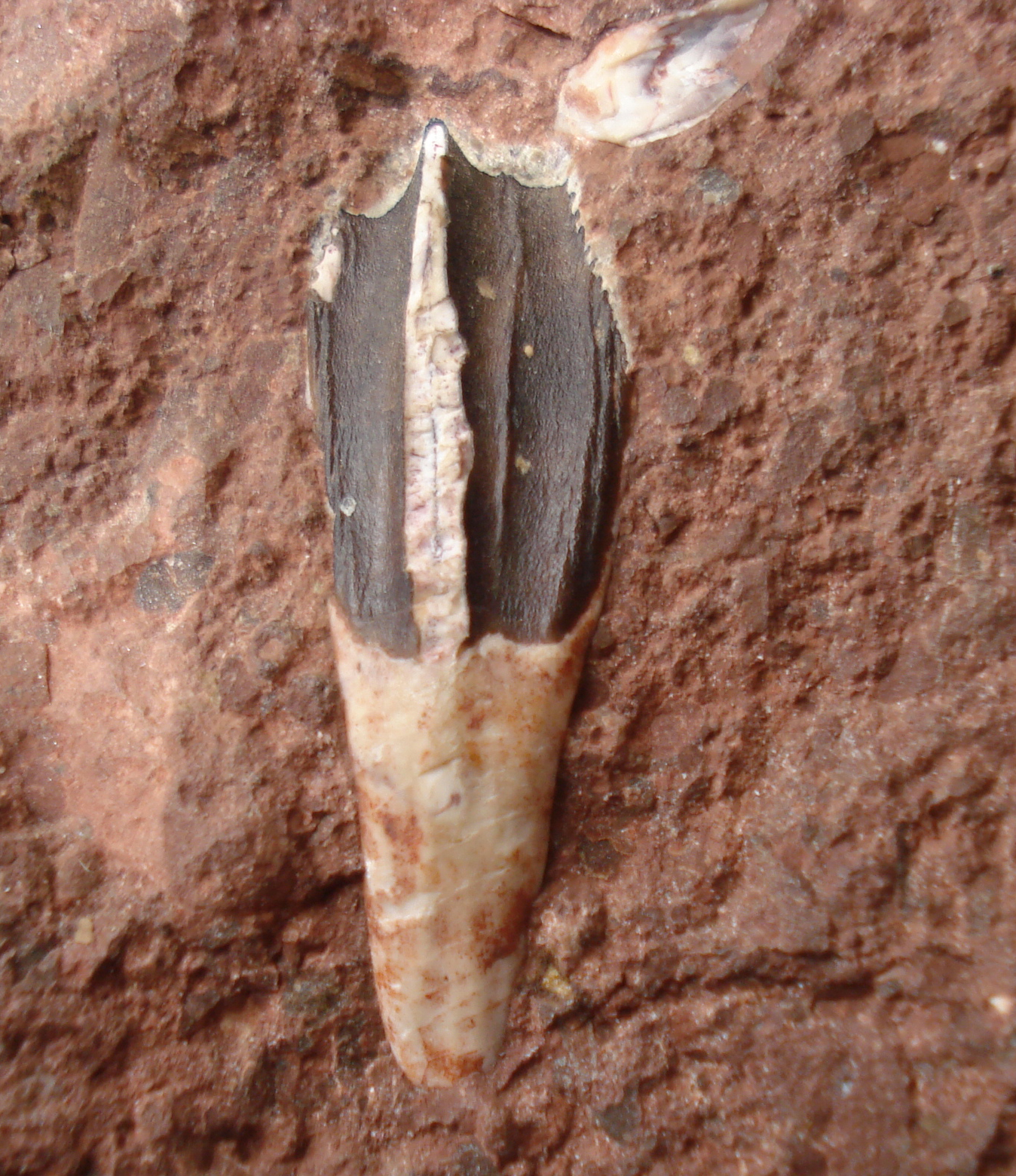
- Tooth of Siamodon nimngami

Scientific classification
- Kingdom: Animalia
- Phylum: Chordata
- Class: Reptilia
- Clade: Dinosauria
- Clade: †Ornithischia
- Clade: †Ornithopoda
- Clade: †Iguanodontia
- Genus: †Siamodon; Buffetaut & Suteethorn, 2011

Type species
- †Siamodon nimngami Buffetaut & Suteethorn, 2011

= Siamodon =

Siamodon Temporal range: Aptian ~120–113 Ma

Extinct genus of dinosaurs

Siamodon is an extinct genus of iguanodontian ornithopod dinosaur from Early Cretaceous deposits of northeastern Thailand.

== Discovery ==
Siamodon is known from the holotype PRC-4, a well-preserved left maxilla and from the referred materials PRC-5, an isolated maxillary tooth and PRC-6, a braincase. It was collected in the Ban Saphan Hin site, Nakhon Ratchasima Province, from the Khok Kruat Formation, dating to the Aptian stage of the late Early Cretaceous, about 125-113 million years ago.

== Description ==
Siamodon shows a combination of plesiomorphic and apomorphic features, including a maxilla shaped like an isosceles triangle, with the dorsal process located at about mid-length of the bone; a strong longitudinal bulge on the medial surface of the maxilla; at least 25 maxillary teeth, which bear a prominent median primary ridge, and one short weak subsidiary ridge or no subsidiary ridge at all, and mamillated denticles on the crown margins. The maxilla is 230 millimeters long, and has a height of 100 millimeters. The height of the isolated tooth is about 25-28 millimeters, and the width is about 14-17 millimeters.

Siamodon differs from more basal iguanodontians, such as Iguanodon and closely related forms, in the morphology of its maxillary teeth, which are narrower and bear a strong median primary ridge, sometimes accompanied by a weak subsidiary ridge, instead of a distally displaced primary ridge and several subsidiary ridges, and the apex of the maxilla is in a more posterior position. Its maxilla differs from that of hadrosaurids in the articular area for the jugal, with forms a tab-like jugal process. Whereas in hadrosaurids, the expanded anterior end of the jugal contacts and overlaps a large sutural area on the maxilla.

The combination of characters seen in the maxilla of Siamodon nimngami indicate that it belongs to a group of iguanodontians more derived than Iguanodon but basal to Hadrosauridae. It may be closely related to Probactrosaurus from China but they differ in the number of tooth positions.

== Etymology ==
Siamodon was first named by Éric Buffetaut and Varavudh Suteethorn in 2011. The type species is Siamodon nimngami. The generic name is derived from Siam, the ancient name of Thailand; and odous, Greek for "tooth". The specific name is in honour of Witaya Nimngam, who donated the specimens to the authors.
