= Department of Mineral Resources (Thailand) =

The Department of Mineral Resources (DMR, Thai: กรมทรัพยากรธรณี) is a Thai government agency under the Ministry of Natural Resources and Environment. It is responsible for the management of the country's geological resources and geology-related matters.

The department was established in 1892 as the Royal Department of Mines and Geology. It was originally responsible for mining management, though its scope later extended to cover petroleum and ground water management as well. It was placed under various ministries throughout the 20th century, coming under the Ministry of Industry from 1972 to 2002.

As a result of government reorganization in 2002, the DMR was split into four departments: the current DMR and the Department of Ground Water Resources under the Ministry of Natural Resources and Environment, the Department of Primary Industries and Mines under the Ministry of Industry, and the Department of Mineral Fuels under the Ministry of Energy. The DMR is now tasked with preservation, conservation, rehabilitation and management issues related to geology, mineral resources, fossils, environmental geology, and geohazards, according to the Ministerial Regulation on the Organization of the Department of Minieral Resources, Ministry of Natural Resources and Environment, B.E. 2561 (2018 CE).
