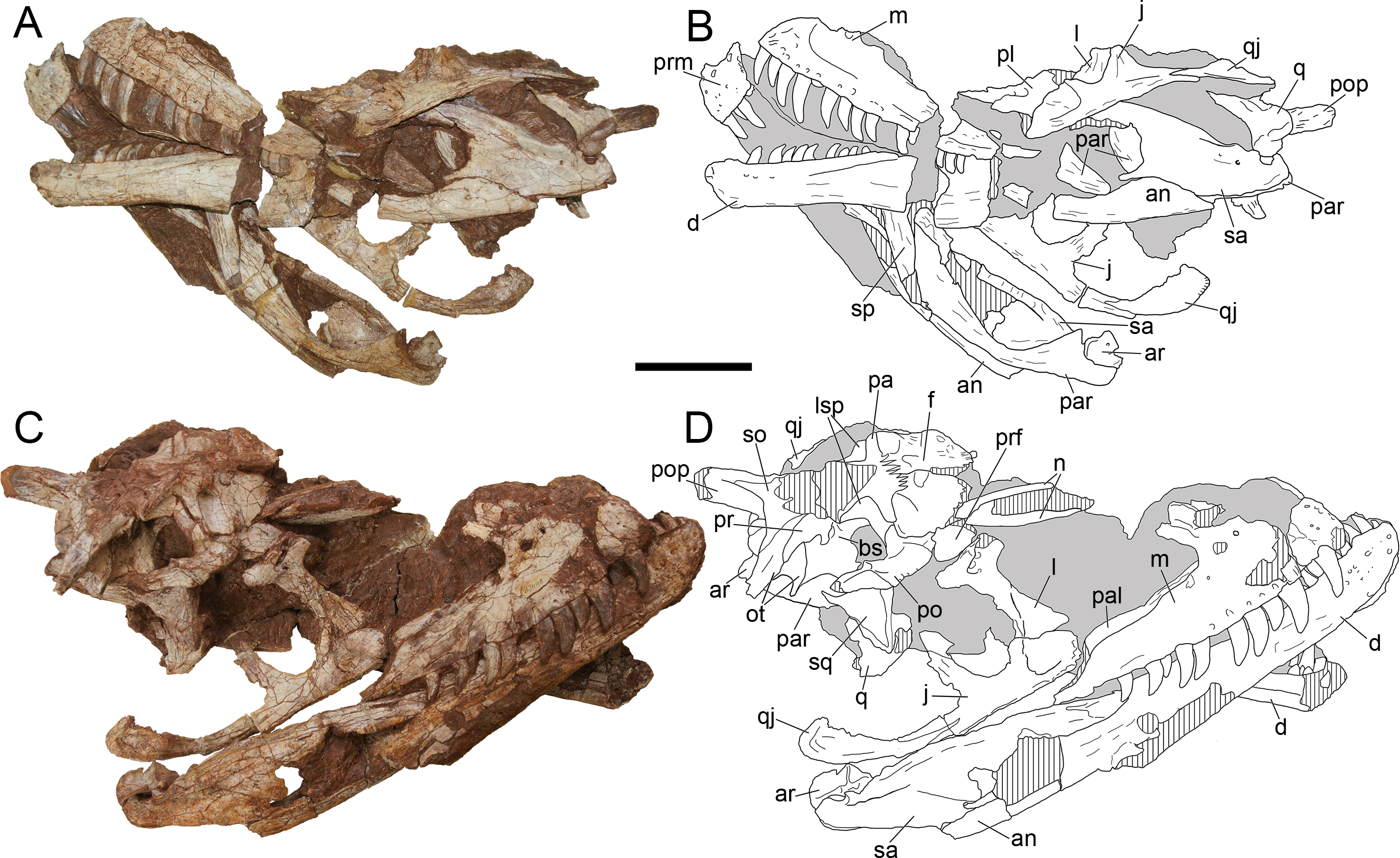
- Holotype skull and mandible
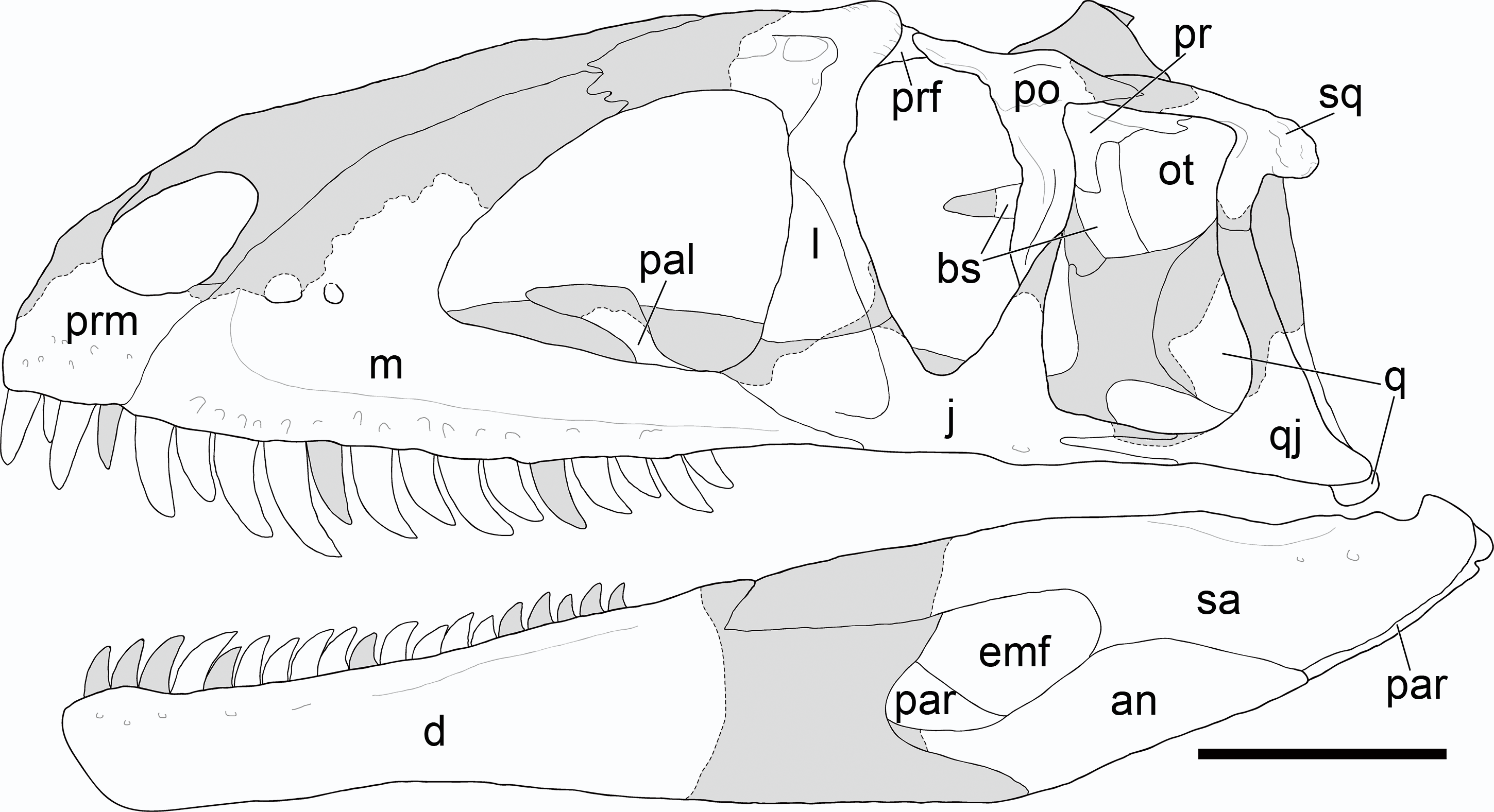
- Reconstructed skull

Scientific classification
- Kingdom: Animalia
- Phylum: Chordata
- Class: Reptilia
- Clade: Dinosauria
- Clade: Saurischia
- Clade: Theropoda
- Superfamily: †Allosauroidea
- Family: †Metriacanthosauridae
- Genus: †Yuanmouraptor; Zou et al., 2025
- Species: †Y. jinshajiangensis

Binomial name
- †Yuanmouraptor jinshajiangensis Zou et al., 2025

= Yuanmouraptor =

Yuanmouraptor Temporal range: Middle Jurassic, Aalenian–Bajocian

Genus of theropod dinosaurs

Yuanmouraptor (meaning "Yuanmou County robber") is an extinct genus of metriacanthosaurid theropod dinosaurs from the Middle Jurassic Zhanghe Formation of China. The genus contains a single species, Yuanmouraptor jinshajiangensis, known from a partial skull and several consecutive vertebrae.

== Discovery and naming ==
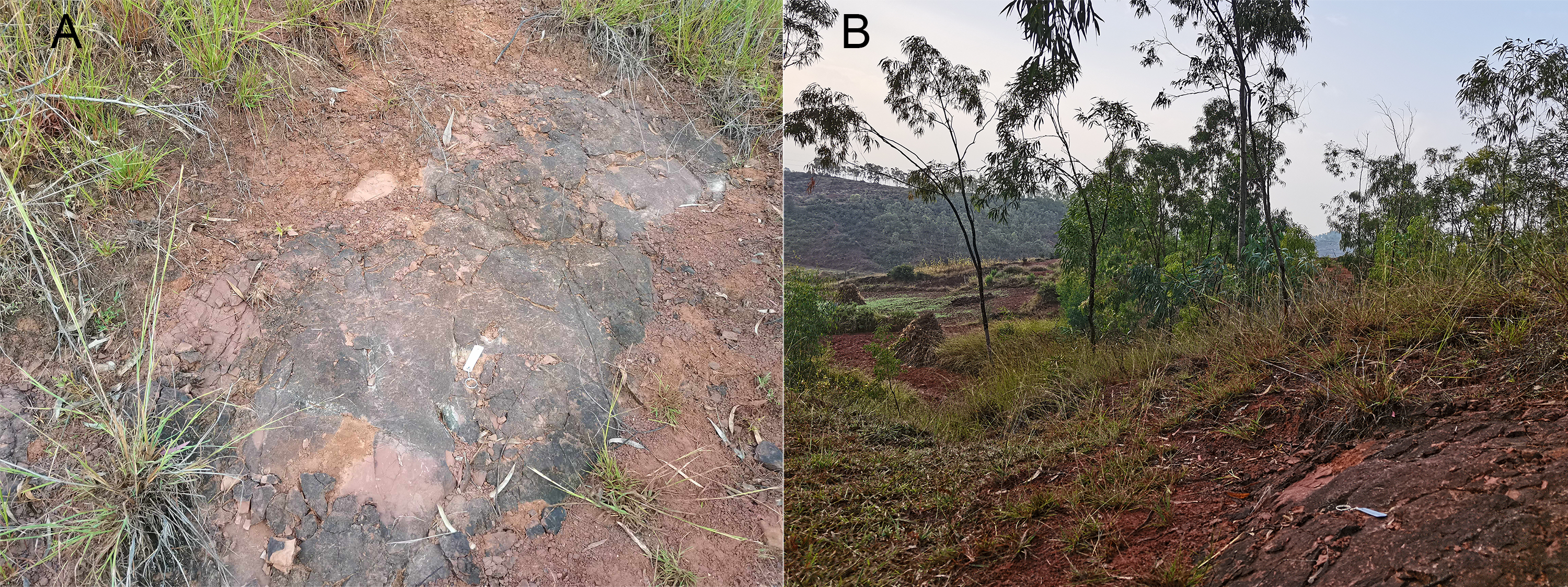
Outcrop (left) and modern environment (right) surrounding the type locality

The Yuanmouraptor holotype specimen, LFGT-ZLJ0115, was discovered in March 2006 in outcrops of the Zhanghe Formation on a farm near Xiabanjing Village of Yuanmou County in Chuxiong Yi Autonomous Prefecture, Yunnan Province, China. The specimen consists of a nearly complete skull and mandible, ten articulated cervical vertebrae, and the first dorsal vertebra.

The name "Yuanmouraptor" was first mentioned in a 2014 newsletter from the Hong Kong Science Museum. As of its 2025 description, the holotype was on display in the Lufeng World Dinosaur Valley Museum.

In 2025, Zou and colleagues described Yuanmouraptor jinshajiangensis as a new genus and species of metriacanthosaurid dinosaurs based on these fossil remains. The generic name, Yuanmouraptor, combines a reference to the discovery of the holotype in Yuanmou County with the Latin word raptor, meaning "robber". The specific name, jinshajiangensis, references the Jinsha River, as the type locality is on the river's north bank.

== Description ==
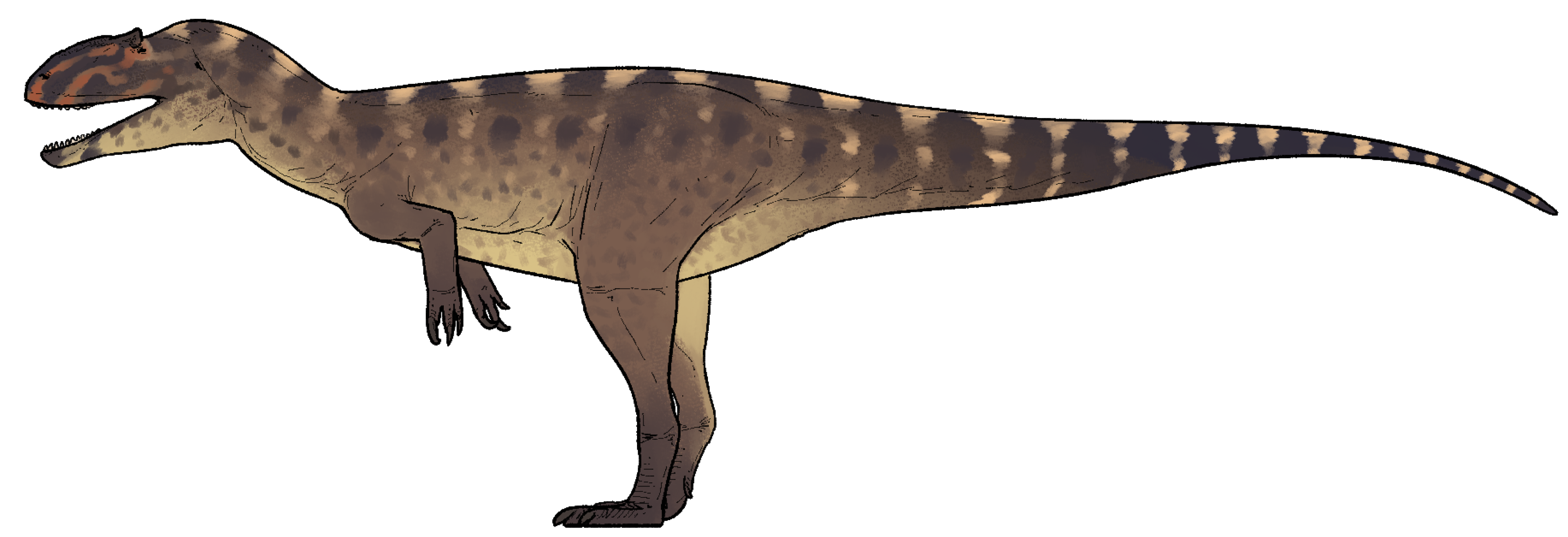
Speculative life restoration

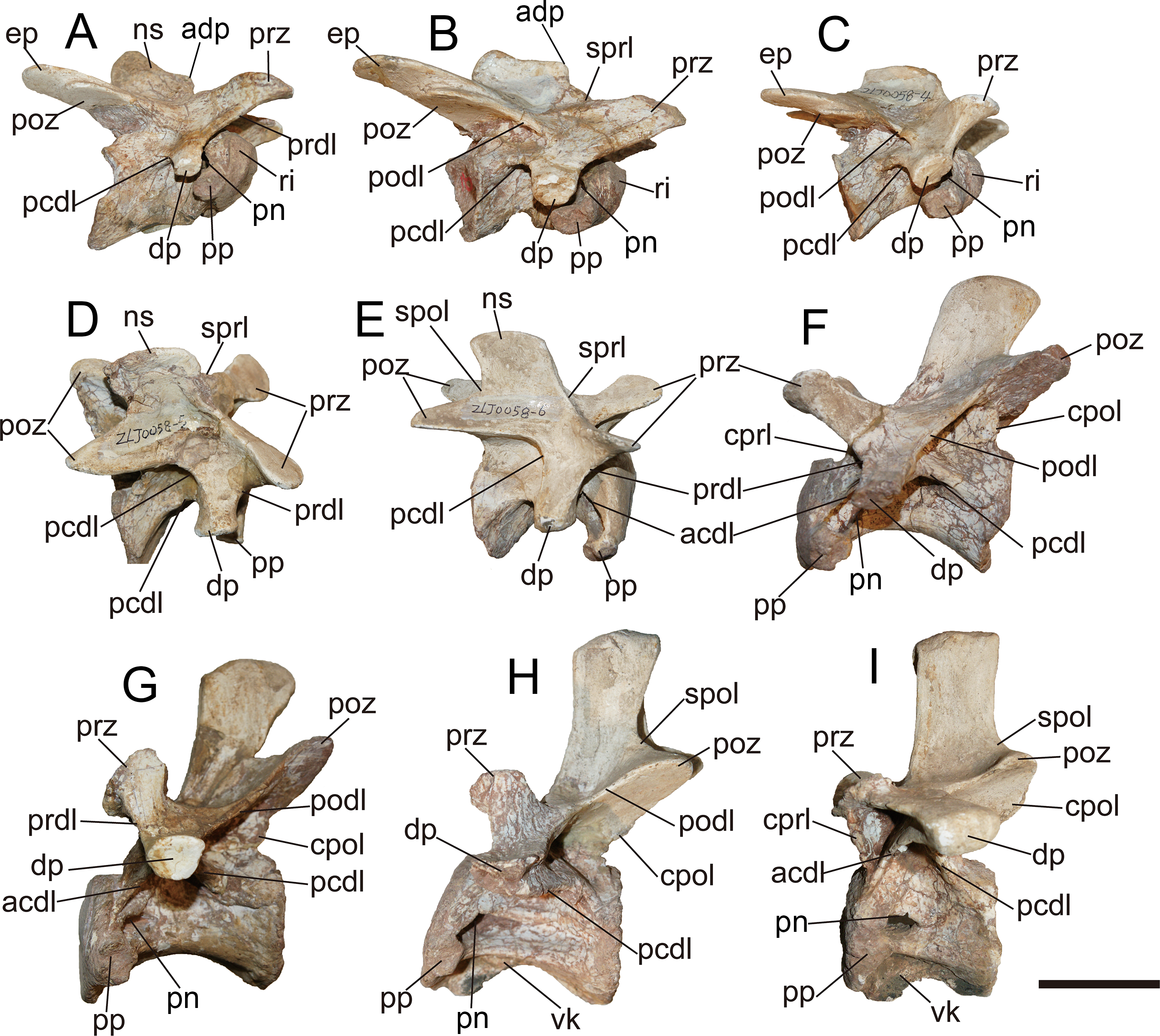
Holotype cervical and dorsal vertebrae

Yuanmouraptor is described as a "medium-sized" metriacanthosaurid. In all of the holotype vertebrae, the neural arch is fused to the respective centrum, with the neurocentral suture only somewhat visible on the eighth and ninth cervical vertebrae. As these sutures are open in juvenile animals, the prominent fusion is indicative of a subadult or nearly mature ontogenetic stage for this individual. As preserved, the holotype skull is 53.9 centimetres (21.2 in) long. When reconstructed, its full length is around 60 centimetres (24 in). In comparison, the holotype skull of Yangchuanosaurus shangyouensis is 78 centimetres (31 in) long, belonging to an animal around 8 metres (26 ft) long.

Several autapomorphies (unique derived traits) of Yuanmouraptor are observable in the postorbital (skull bone forming the back of the orbit) and cervical vertebrae. These include an anterior (toward the front) process of the postorbital that is sheet-shaped with a consistent depth, a ventral (toward the bottom) ramus of the postorbital with a laterally twisted trough going over the outer surface, strongly posteriorly elongated epipophyses (projections above the back articular process) on the anterior cervical vertebrae, and a strongly ventromedially (down and toward the midline) excavated pneumatic foramen (air sac) on the third cervical vertebra.

== Classification ==
Prior to its scientific naming and description, Hendrickx et al. (2019) mentioned the Yuanmouraptor holotype as belonging to an indeterminate member of the allosauroid family Metriacanthosauridae. In their phylogenetic analyses when describing Yuanmouraptor, Zou et al. (2025) recovered this taxon—as well as the slightly younger Xuanhanosaurus—as the most basal members of the Metriacanthosauridae. These results are displayed in the cladogram below:

- Tetanurae
  - Monolophosaurus
  - Chuandongocoelurus
  - - Megalosauroidea
      - Spinosauridae
      - Megalosauridae
    - - Piatnitzkysauridae
      - Avetheropoda
        - Coelurosauria
        - - Asfaltovenator
          - Allosauroidea
            - Allosauria
            - Metriacanthosauridae
              - Yuanmouraptor
              - Xuanhanosaurus
              - - - 'Szechuanosaurus' zigongensis
                  - - Shidaisaurus
                    - - CNM V214
                      - Yangchuanosaurus
                - Metriacanthosaurinae
                  - - Alpkarakush
                    - Metriacanthosaurus
                  - - Siamotyrannus
                    - - Sinraptor hepingensis
                      - Sinraptor dongi
