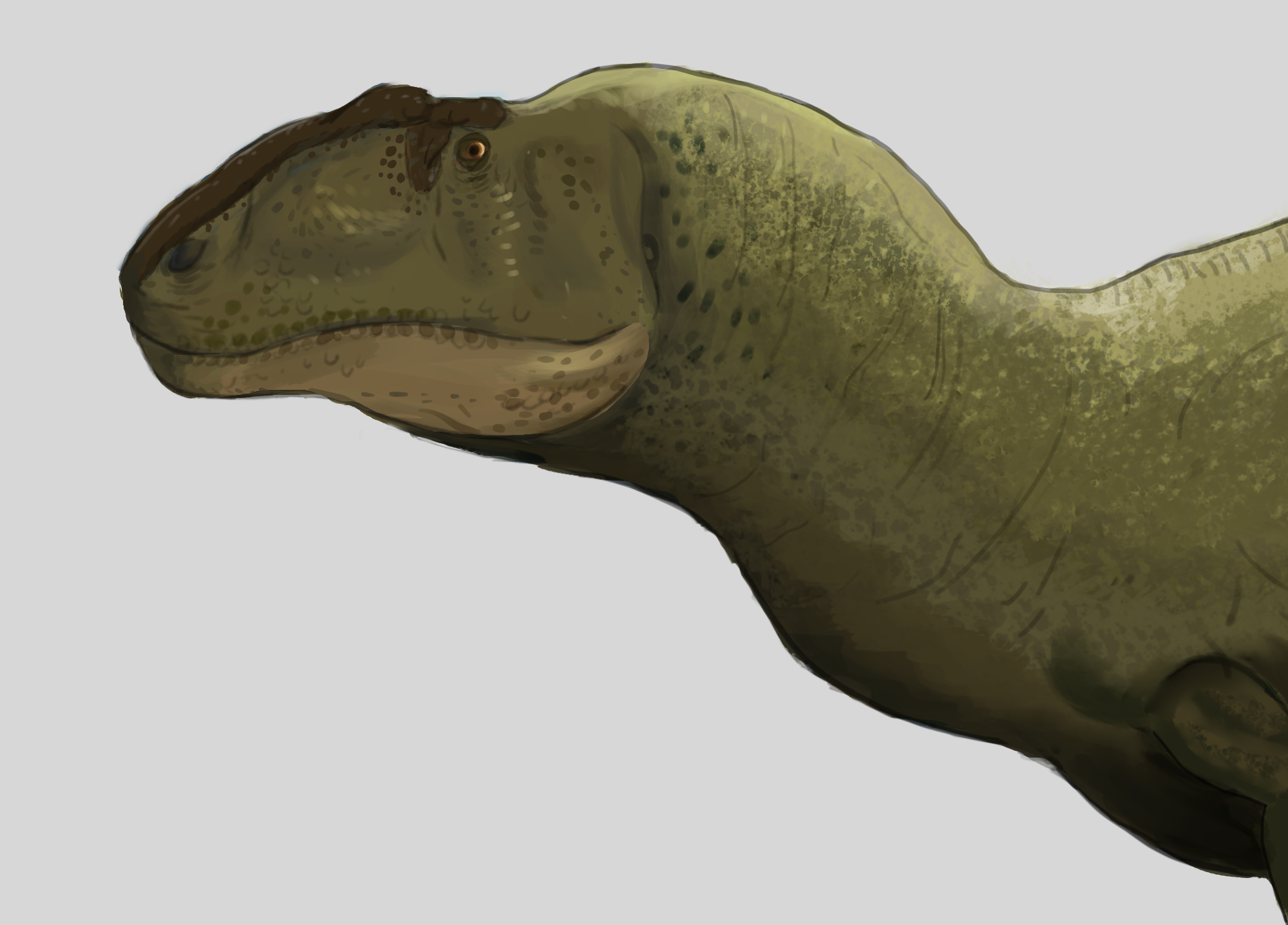
- Speculative life restoration

Scientific classification
- Kingdom: Animalia
- Phylum: Chordata
- Class: Reptilia
- Clade: Dinosauria
- Clade: Saurischia
- Clade: Theropoda
- Family: †Metriacanthosauridae
- Subfamily: †Metriacanthosaurinae
- Genus: †Shidaisaurus
- Species: †S. jinae

Binomial name
- †Shidaisaurus jinae Wu et al., 2009

= Shidaisaurus =

Shidaisaurus Temporal range: Early Aalenian, 174 Ma

Extinct genus of dinosaurs

Shidaisaurus is a genus of metriacanthosaurid dinosaur. Its fossil was found in early Middle Jurassic-age rocks of the Chuanjie Formation in Yunnan, China. It is known from a partial skeleton, holotype DML-LCA 9701-IV, found at the bottom of an assemblage of nine dinosaur individuals, lacking most of the tail vertebrae, ribs, pectoral girdle, and limb bones. Shidaisaurus was described in 2009 by Wu and colleagues. The type species is Shidaisaurus jinae. Generic name and specific name in combination refer to the Jin-Shidai ("Golden Age") Company that oversaw excavation and inspection of the Jurassic World Park near the site.

== Description ==
Based on the known remains, Shidaisaurus was a medium-sized, predatory theropod much like its kin. Its skull bears many similarities to its close relative Sinraptor. Most of the posterior portion of the skull is preserved, including the frontals, parietals, nasals, teeth, and the braincase. Many elements of its skull resemble Sinraptor the most, such as the outline of the parietal bones. Most of the major portions of the braincase are preserved. The paroccipital process faces down and to the sides, much like other allosauroids. However, they do not project downward nearly as much as seen in Allosaurus, possibly owing to the animal's status as a very basal member. Certain aspects of Shidaisaurus braincase also resemble Sinraptor the most, such as the outline of the supraoccipital bones.

Shidaisaurus possesses a unique combination of features in the skeleton that distinguish it from other theropods (its autapomorphies). For example, the supraoccipital bones are prevented from entering the foramen magnum by the exoccipitals. Its second cervical (neck) vertebra, the axis, has a tall and sharply pointing epipophysis. Between the epipophysis and neural spine is a thin lamina that appears broader than it does in other theropods with the same structure. The length of its pubis, when measured from below the front to behind and above, is equal to the height of its iliac blade. It also lacks a ventral notch distal to the obturator process on its ischium

The postcranial skeleton shows many features shared with other tetanurans. Its neural spines are tall and swept slightly posterodorsally like in related allosauroids. Only two of the neck vertebrae are known in detail since the rest of the cervicals were obscured by the sauropod skeleton. Based on the condition in Sinraptor and Yangchuanosaurus, Shidaisaurus is thought to have had a total of 25 vertebrae before the sacrum, consisting of 9 cervicals and 13 dorsals. A total of 4 sacral vertebrae are present, although the tail is incomplete, making a precise count of its caudals impossible.

Many of its dorsal vertebrae lack the pleurocoels seen in the dorsal vertebrae of related animals, owing to its primitive nature. This theropod according to Gregory Paul was about 6 metres (20 ft) long and it weighed around 700 kilograms (1,500 lb). In 2016 another estimation listed it higher at 7.1 meters (23.3 feet) long and 950 kilograms (2,094 lbs).

== Classification ==
- Orionides
  - Megalosauroidea
  - Avetheropoda
    - Coelurosauria
      - Lourinhanosaurus
      - Other coelurosaurians
    - Allosauroidea
      - Allosauria
        - Allosauridae
        - Carcharodontosauria
          - Neovenatoridae
          - Carcharodontosauridae
      - Metriacanthosauridae
        - - Yangchuanosaurus zigongensis
          - - CV 00214
            - Yangchuanosaurus shangyouensis
        - Metriacanthosaurinae
          - Shidaisaurus
          - - Metriacanthosaurus
            - - "Sinraptor" hepingensis
              - - Sinraptor dongi
                - Siamotyrannus
