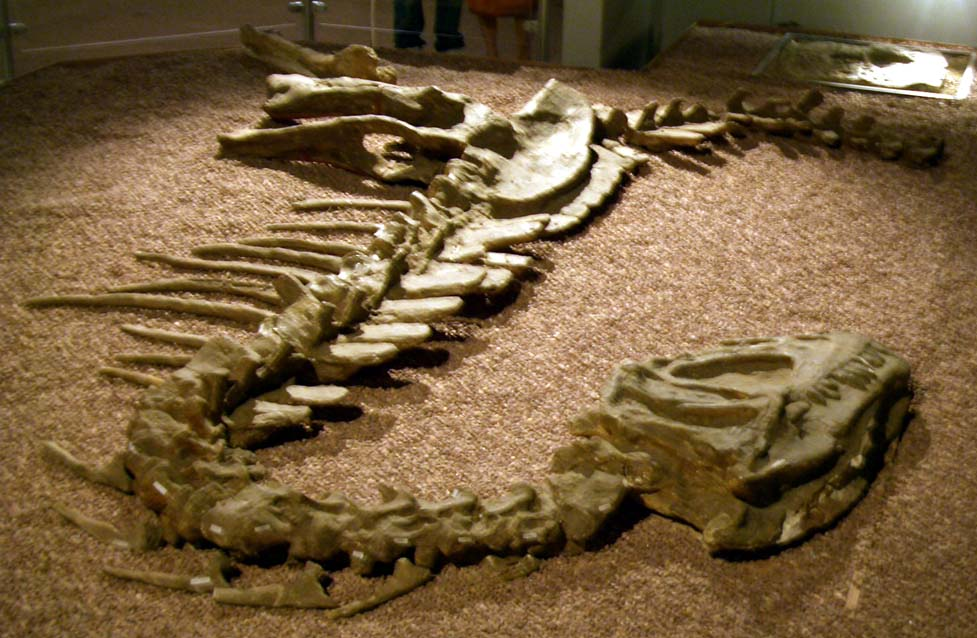
- Y. shangyouensis skeleton displayed in Hong Kong Science Museum

Scientific classification
- Kingdom: Animalia
- Phylum: Chordata
- Class: Reptilia
- Clade: Dinosauria
- Clade: Saurischia
- Clade: Theropoda
- Family: †Metriacanthosauridae
- Genus: †Yangchuanosaurus; Dong et al., 1978

Type species
- †Yangchuanosaurus shangyouensis Dong et al., 1978

Other species
- †Y.? hepingensis Gao, 1992; †Y.? zigongensis (Gao, 1993) Carrano et al., 2012

Synonyms
- Synonyms of Y. shangyouensis: Yangchuanosaurus magnus Dong, Zhou & Zhang, 1983; Szechuanosaurus "yandonensis" Dong et al., 1978; "Szechuanoraptor dongi" Chure, 2000 (nomen ex dissertationae); Metriacanthosaurus shangyouensis (Dong et al., 1978) Paul, 1988; Metriacanthosaurus "carpenteri" Paul, 1988 (nomen nudum); Synonyms of Y.? zigongensis: Szechuanosaurus zigongensis Gao, 1993

= Yangchuanosaurus =

Yangchuanosaurus Temporal range: 168.3–145 Ma

Genus of dinosaurs from the Jurassic period

Yangchuanosaurus is an extinct genus of metriacanthosaurid theropod dinosaur that lived in China from the Middle Jurassic to Late Jurassic periods (Bathonian to Tithonian stages), and was similar (although slightly larger) in size and appearance to its North American and European relative, Allosaurus. Yangchuanosaurus hails from the Upper Shaximiao Formation and was the largest predator in a landscape that included the sauropods Mamenchisaurus and Omeisaurus, and the stegosaurs Chialingosaurus, Tuojiangosaurus, and Chungkingosaurus. This theropod was named after the area in which was discovered, Yongchuan, in China.

== Discovery and species ==
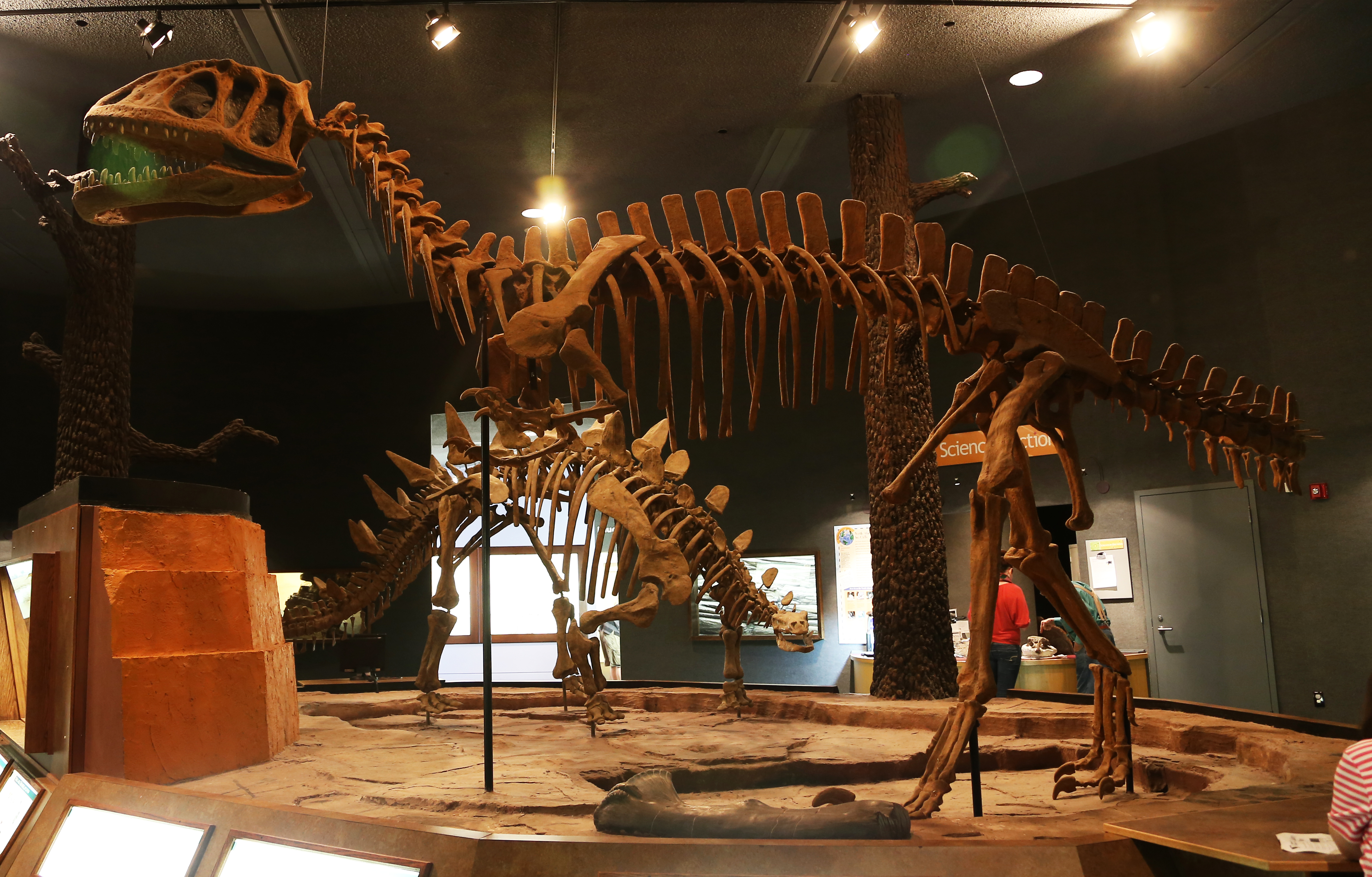
Mounted skeleton of Y. zigongensis, Delaware Museum of Natural History

Dong et al. (1978) named Yangchuanosaurus shangyouensis on the basis of Municipal Museum of Chongqing 00215, a complete skull and skeleton which was collected from the Shangshaximiao Formation, near Yongchuan, Yongchuan District, Sichuan. It dates to the Oxfordian stage of the Late Jurassic period, about 161.2 to 157.3 million years ago. It was discovered in June 1977 by a construction worker during the construction of the Shangyou Reservoir Dam. A second species from the same locality, Y. magnus, was named by Dong et al. (1983) on the basis of CV 00216, another complete skull and skeleton. A detailed revision of tetanuran phylogeny by Carrano, Benson & Sampson (2012) revealed that both species are conspecific. Dong et al. (1978) and Dong et al. (1983) differentiated these species primarily on the basis of size. In addition, Dong et al. (1983) noted that the maxilla of Y. magnus has an additional fenestra within the antorbital fossa, whereas Y. shangyouensis possessed only a fossa in this location. However, it is considered to be an intraspecific, possibly ontogenetic, variation. Furthermore, the apparent difference in cervical vertebral morphology can be explained by comparing different positions within the column. Hence, the holotypes of the two species of Yangchuanosaurus are effectively identical, and their codings are identical in Carrano et al. (2012) matrix. Gregory S. Paul (1988) regarded this genus as a synonym of Metriacanthosaurus, but this has not been supported.

=== Additional specimens ===
Life reconstruction of Y. shangyouensis

Y.? hepingensis is a species named by Gao in 1992, but it was subsequently referred to as a species of Sinraptor. However, the identity of this species within Sinraptor is questioned by other paleontologists, and Rauhut and colleagues included this species within Yangchuanosaurus based on their phylogenetic analysis in 2019 and 2024 respectively.

Carrano et al. (2012) assigned a third specimen to Y. shangyouensis. CV 00214 is represented by a partial postcranial skeleton lacking the skull. It was collected in the Wujiaba Quarry, near Zigong city, Sichuan, from the lower part of the Shangshaximiao Formation. CV 00214 was initially listed by Dong et al. (1978) in a faunal list as a new species of Szechuanosaurus, Szechuanosaurus "yandonensis". There is no description or illustration of it, making S. "yandonensis" a nomen nudum. Paul (1988) listed CV 00214 as Metriacanthosaurus? sp., but earlier in his discussion of the genus, uses the name M. carpenteri. Regardless, under ICZN Article 11.5, the name Metriacanthosaurus "carpenteri" is a nomen nudum, and its inclusion is likely a typographical error. Later, Dong et al. (1983) described it, and assigned it to Szechuanosaurus campi, a dubious species which is known only from four teeth. Carrano et al. (2012) noted that CV 00214 can't be assigned to S. campi because the holotype materials of S. campi (IVPP V.235, V.236, V.238, V.239; teeth) are non-diagnostic and no teeth are preserved in CV 00214. In his doctoral dissertation, Chure (2000) restudied CV 00214 and concluded that it represented a new taxon, which he informally named "Szechuanoraptor dongi", into which Szechuanosaurus zigongensis should also be subsumed. However, Carrano et al. (2012) suggested that CV 00214 and "S." zigongensis cannot be conspecific, as there are no autapomorphies shared between them, and the latter derives from the underlying Xiashaximiao Formation. A phylogenetic analysis found CV 00214 to be most closely related to Y. shangyouensis, and thus the former is assignable to it. Furthermore, Szechuanosaurus zigongensis was found to be closely related to Y. shangyouensis and therefore was designated as a new species of Yangchuanosaurus, though this has been considered questionable by Rauhut and colleagues.

Y.? zigongensis is known from four specimens including ZDM 9011 (holotype), a partial postcranial skeleton; ZDM 9012, a left maxilla; ZDM 9013, two teeth and ZDM 9014, a right hind limb. It was first described by Gao (1993), and all specimens were collected from the Middle Jurassic Xiashaximiao Formation in the Dashanpu Dinosaur Quarry of Zigong, Sichuan.

The informal species, Y. "longqiaoensis", was briefly mentioned in a faunal listing of the Penglaizhen Formation (initially believed to date to the Late Jurassic but may be Early Cretaceous (Berriasian-Valanginian) in age) by Li, Zhang and Cai (1999). However, since it was published solely in a faunal list and not described in detail, it is a nomen nudum and is questionably referable to Yangchuanosaurus.

== Description ==
Size of two Y. shangyouensis specimens compared to a human

The type specimen of Y. shangyouensis had a skull 82 centimeters (2.69 ft) long, and its total body length was estimated at 8 meters (26 ft). Another specimen, assigned to the new species Y. magnus, was even larger, with a skull length of 1.11 meters (3.6 ft). It may have been up to 10.8 meters (35 ft) long, and weighed as much as 3.4 metric tons (3.7 short tons). Gregory S. Paul suggested that these are the same species and gave a length of 11 meters (36 feet) and a weight of 3 metric tons (3.3 short tons).

Yangchuanosaurus was a large, powerful meat-eater. It walked on two large, muscular legs, had short arms, a strong, short neck, a big head with powerful jaws, and large, serrated teeth. It had a long, massive tail that was about half of its length. The first digit of its foot was a small dewclaw. The three outer toes were used to bear weight and each was equipped with a large claw.

== Classification ==
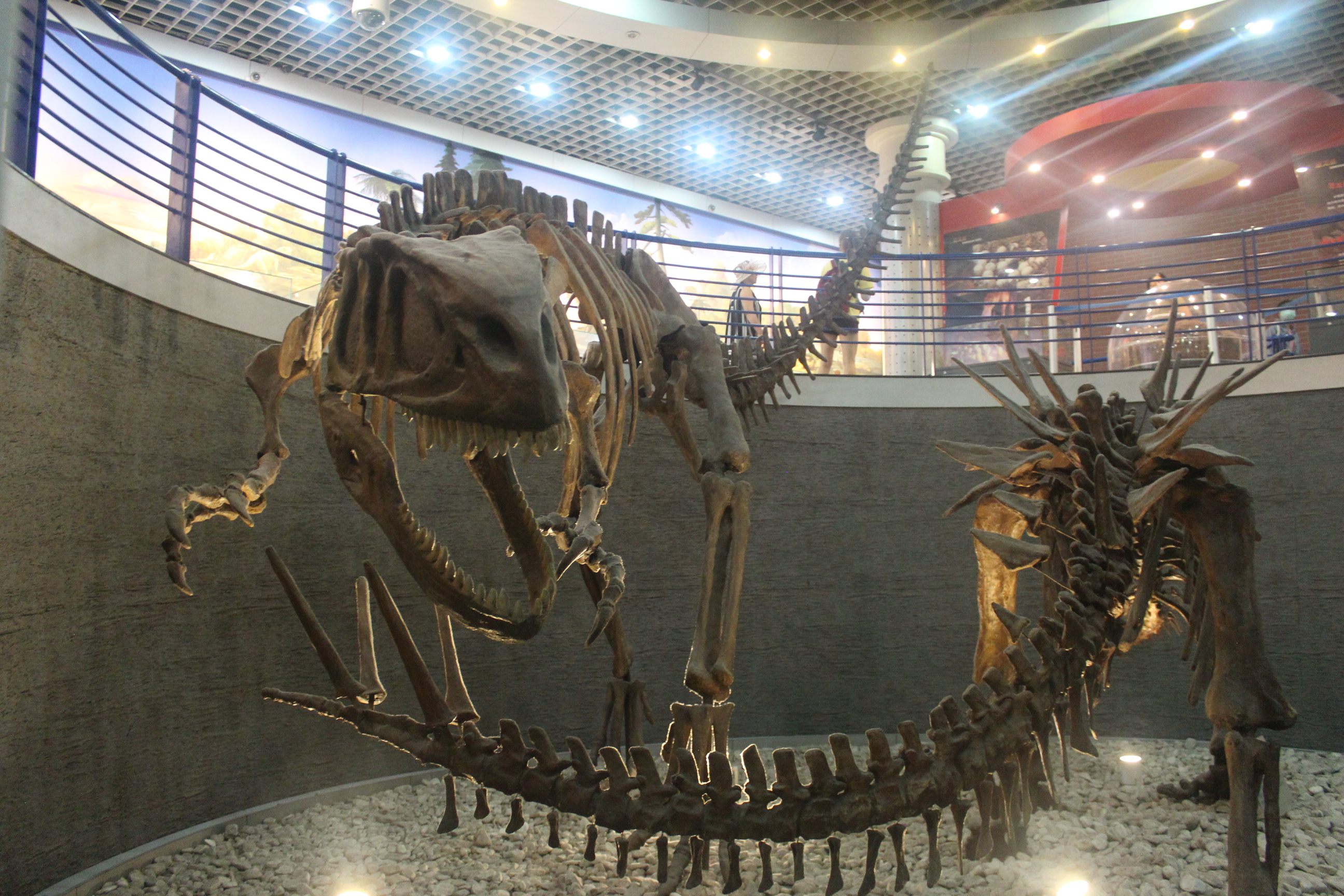
Mounted skeletons of Yangchuanosaurus and Tuojiangosaurus, Beijing Museum of Natural History

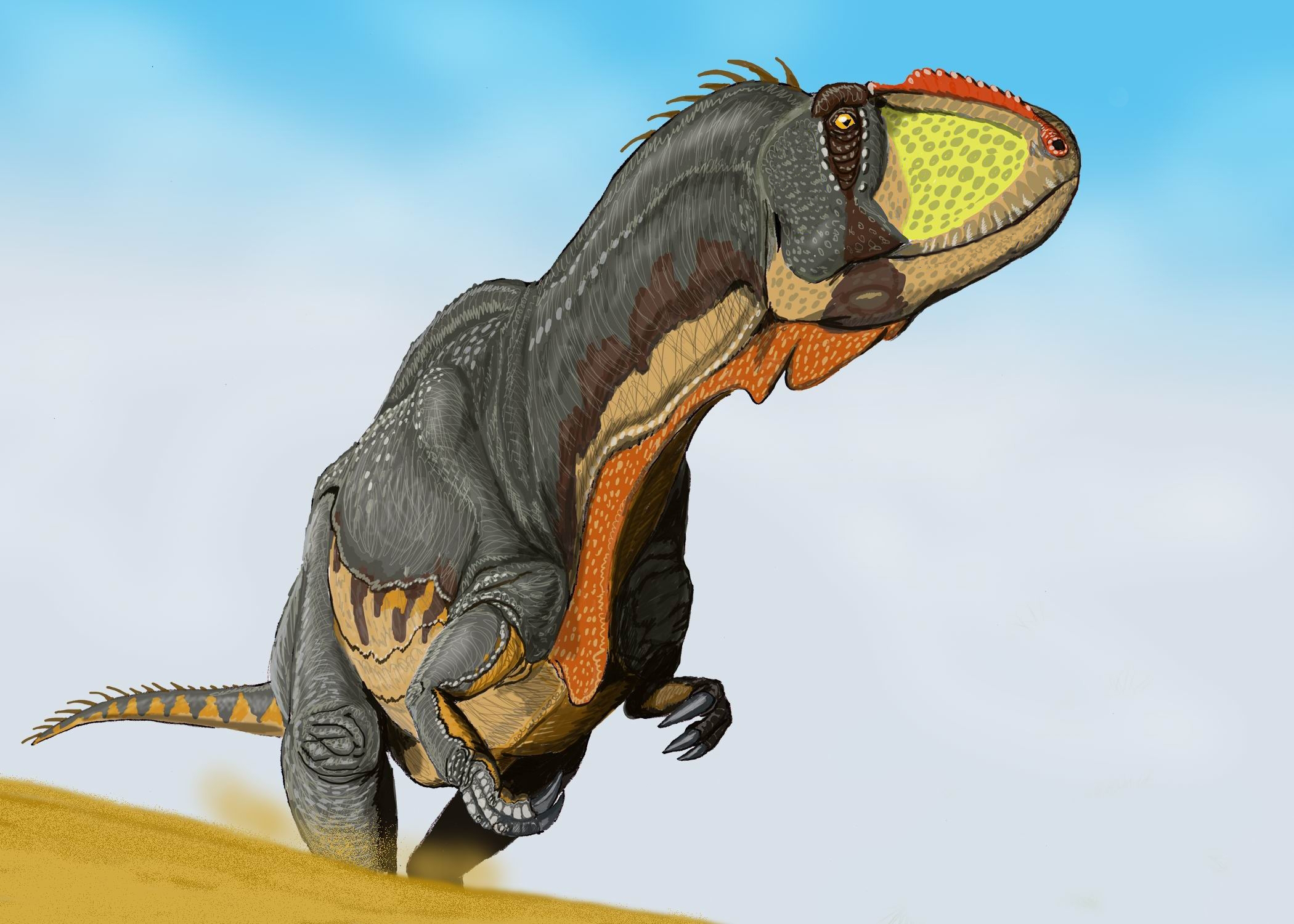
Life reconstruction of Y. shangyouensis

A phylogenetic analysis by Carrano et al. (2012) found Yangchuanosaurus to be the basalmost known metriacanthosaurid and the only non-metriacanthosaurine metriacanthosaurid. The cladogram presented below follows their study.

- Orionides
  - Megalosauroidea
  - Avetheropoda
    - Coelurosauria
      - Lourinhanosaurus
      - Other coelurosaurians
    - Allosauroidea
      - Allosauria
        - Allosauridae
        - Carcharodontosauria
          - Neovenatoridae
          - Carcharodontosauridae
      - Metriacanthosauridae
        - Yangchuanosaurus
          - Y. zigongensis
          - Y. shangyouensis
            - CV 00214
            - CV 00215 and CV 00216
        - Metriacanthosaurinae
          - Shidaisaurus
          - - Metriacanthosaurus
            - - "Sinraptor" hepingensis
              - - Sinraptor dongi
                - Siamotyrannus

The cladogram presented below follows Zanno & Makovicky (2013).

- Allosauroidea
  - Metriacanthosauridae
    - - Yangchuanosaurus zigongensis
      - - CV 00214
        - Yangchuanosaurus shangyouensis
    - - Shidaisaurus jinae
      - - "Sinraptor" hepingensis
        - - Metriacanthosaurus parkeri
          - - Sinraptor dongi
            - Siamotyrannus isanensis
  - Allosauria
    - Allosauridae
      - Allosaurus fragilis
      - Saurophaganax maximus
    - Carcharodontosauria
      - Neovenatoridae
        - Neovenator salerii
        - - Chilantaisaurus tashuikouensis
          - Megaraptora
            - Siats meekerorum
            - - Australovenator wintonensis
              - Fukuiraptor kitadaniensis
            - - Aerosteon riocoloradensis
              - Megaraptor namunhuaiquii
      - Carcharodontosauridae
        - - Eocarcharia dinops
          - Concavenator corcovatus
        - - Acrocanthosaurus atokensis
          - - Shaochilong maortuensis
            - Carcharodontosaurinae
              - Carcharodontosaurus saharicus
              - Giganotosaurini
                - Tyrannotitan chubutensis
                - - Giganotosaurus carolinii
                  - Mapusaurus roseae

In 2019, Rauhut and Pol included Y.? hepingensis as a species of Yangchuanosaurus, while Y? zigongensis was recovered as a metriacanthosaurid not closely related to Yangchuanosaurus in their phylogenetic analysis. In 2024, Rauhut and colleagues, the describers of Alpkarakush, included both Y. shangyouensis and Y.? hepingensis within Yangchuanosaurus but recovered Y.? zigongensis outside the genus as a basal tetanuran of uncertain taxonomic position based on their phylogenetic analysis.
