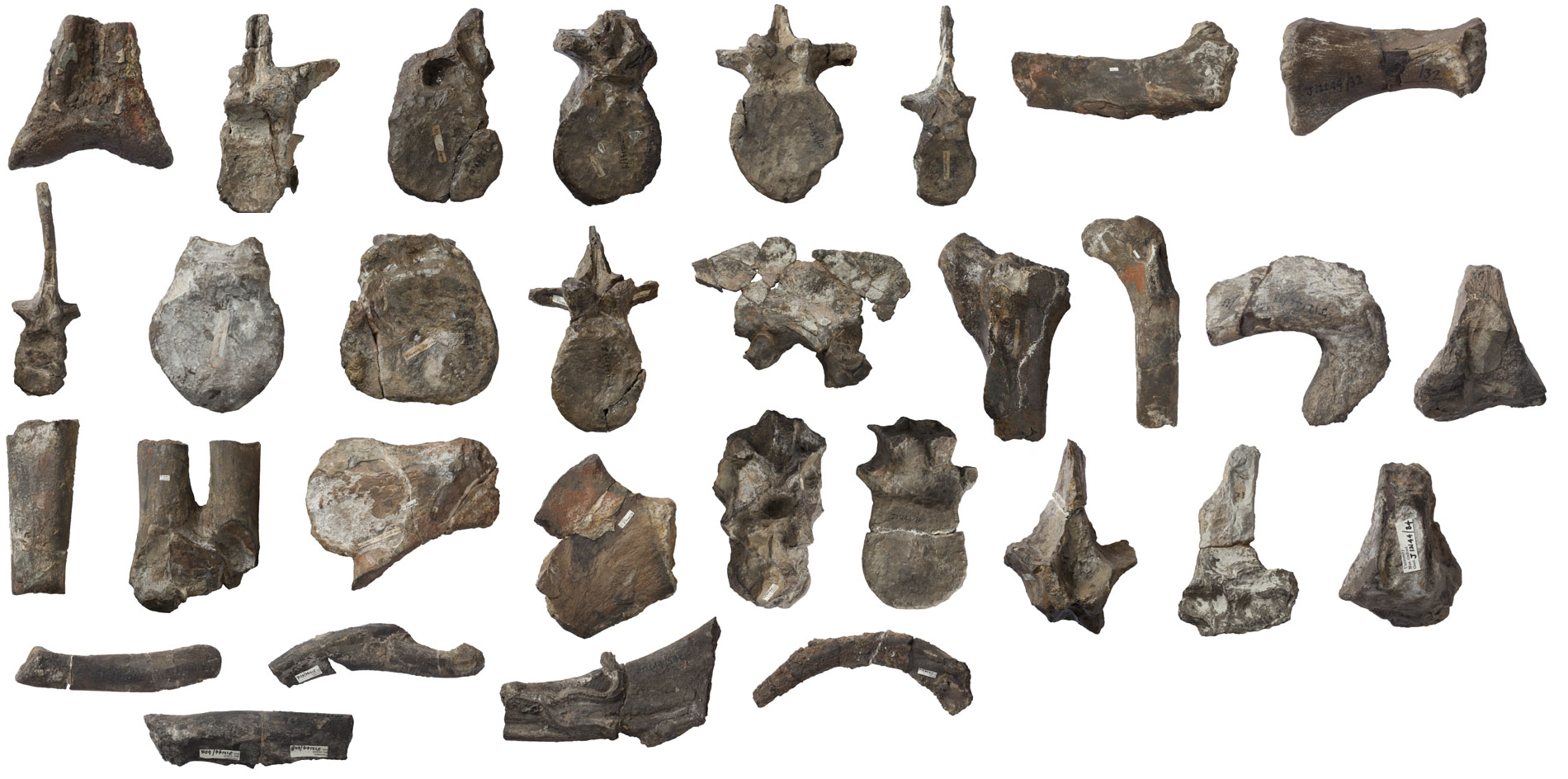
- Part of the holotype of Metriacanthosaurus parkeri (individual fossils not to scale)

Scientific classification
- Kingdom: Animalia
- Phylum: Chordata
- Class: Reptilia
- Clade: Dinosauria
- Clade: Saurischia
- Clade: Theropoda
- Family: †Metriacanthosauridae
- Subfamily: †Metriacanthosaurinae
- Genus: †Metriacanthosaurus; Walker, 1964

Type species
- †Metriacanthosaurus parkeri (von Huene, 1923) Walker, 1964

Synonyms
- Megalosaurus parkeri von Huene, 1923; Altispinax parkeri (von Huene, 1923) von Huene, 1932

= Metriacanthosaurus =

Metriacanthosaurus Temporal range: Late Jurassic, Oxfordian ~160 Ma

Metriacanthosaurid theropod dinosaur genus from Middle Jurassic period

Metriacanthosaurus (meaning "moderately-spined lizard") is a genus of metriacanthosaurid dinosaur from the Oxford Clay Formation of England, dating to the Late Jurassic period, about 160 million years ago (lower Oxfordian). It is the only metriacanthosaurid currently named from outside of Asia.

== History of discovery ==
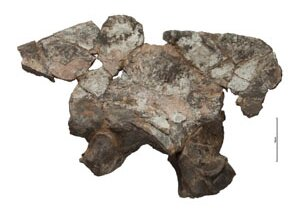
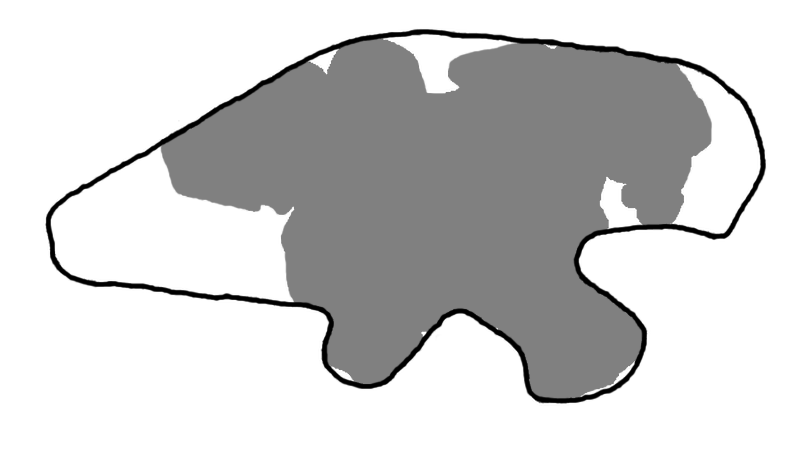
Image (left) and reconstruction (right) of the ilium of the holotype

The holotype of Metriacanthosaurus parkeri, specimen OUM J.12144, was discovered in 1871 by W. Parker at Jordan's Cliff, near Weymouth, Dorset, on the southwest coast of England. The specimen includes an incomplete pelvis, several dorsal and sacral vertebrae, ten caudal vertebrae, femora (thigh bones), and an incomplete tibia (shin bone). The geologist John Phillips briefly commented on the specimen during the same year. These bones were from the Oxford Clay Formation, which dates to the Upper Jurassic.

In 1923, German paleontologist Friedrich von Huene wrote a paper on Jurassic and Cretaceous European carnivorous dinosaurs within Saurischia. In this paper, he examined OUM J.12144, assigning it to a new species of Megalosaurus: Megalosaurus parkeri. The specific name honours W. Parker. In 1932, however, von Huene concluded it was a species of Altispinax, A. parkeri.

In 1964, scientist Alick Walker decided these fossils were too different from Altispinax, as they lacked the long vertebral spines, and named the new genus Metriacanthosaurus. The generic name is derived from Greek metrikos, "moderate", and akantha, "spine". Metriacanthosaurus thus gets its name from its vertebrae, which are taller than typical carnosaurs, like Allosaurus, but lower than other high-spined dinosaurs like Acrocanthosaurus.

== Description ==
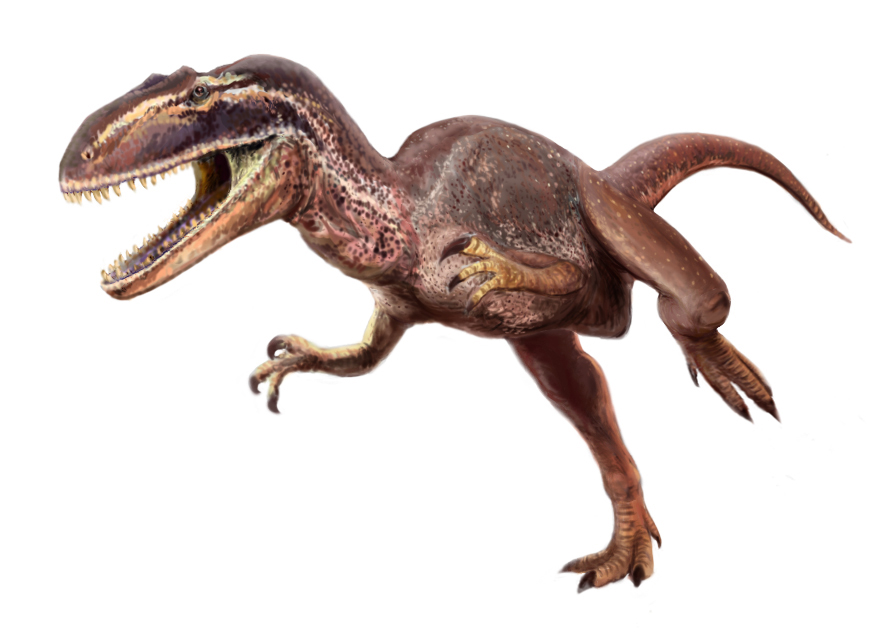
Life restoration

Metriacanthosaurus was a medium-sized theropod with a femur length of 80 cm (31 in). Gregory S. Paul in 1988 estimated its weight at 1 tonne (1.1 short tons). Thomas Holtz gave a length of 8 meters (26.2 feet). Metriacanthosaurus was named for the height of its neural spines, which are actually not overly tall for theropods. They are similar to other theropods such as Megalosaurus, Sinraptor, and Ceratosaurus in being 1.5 times the height of the centrum.

== Classification ==
Originally named as a species of Megalosaurus in Megalosauridae, Metriacanthosaurus has since been reclassified in Metriacanthosauridae. It is thought to be related to genera such as Yangchuanosaurus, and in 1988 Paul synonymized the two genera. However, a 2007 review of British dinosaurs by Darren Naish and David Martill defending keeping the two genera taxonomically separate. Metriacanthosaurus is considered a member of the subfamily Metriacanthosaurinae.

Below is a simplified cladogram of Tetanurae by Matthew Carrano et al. (2012).

- Metriacanthosauridae
  - - Yangchuanosaurus zigongensis
    - - CV 00214
      - Yangchuanosaurus shangyouensis
  - Metriacanthosaurinae
    - Shidaisaurus
    - - Metriacanthosaurus
      - - "Sinraptor" hepingensis
        - - Sinraptor dongi
          - Siamotyrannus

== Paleobiogeography and paleoecology ==
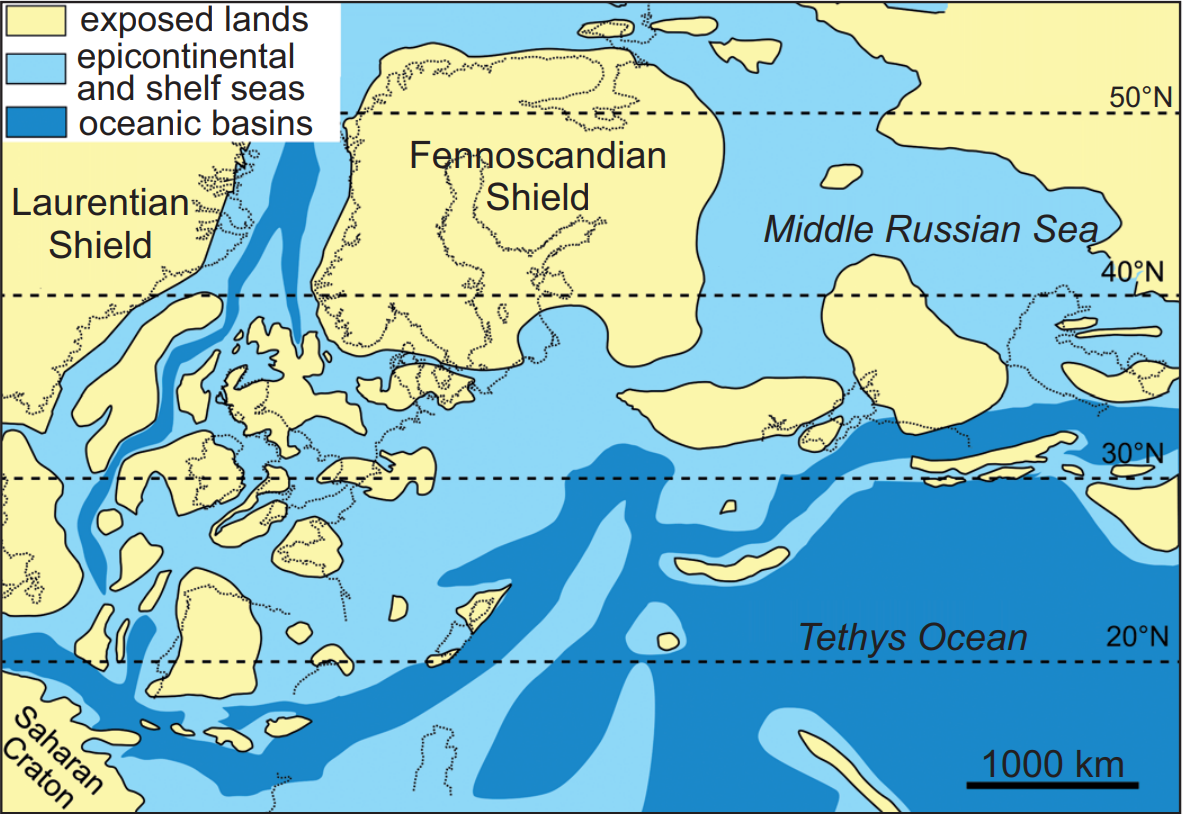
Paleogeographic map of Europe during the early Oxfordian

Metriacanthosaurus is the only known member of Metriacanthosauridae outside of Asia (other than possible fragmentary records from the geographically close Falaises des Vaches Noires locality of northern France, which is probably similar in age to Metriacanthosaurus). The earliest records of metriacanthosaurids in Asia are from the early Middle Jurassic, with Metriocanthosaurus being nested within the diversity of Asian metriacanthosaurids. Metriacanthosaurus thus likely represents a dispersal event from Asia into Europe during the early Late Jurassic. Metriacanthosaurus appears to have lived alongside other large theropods belonging to the family Megalosauridae. Other dinosaurs known from the Oxford Clay (which both spans the preceding Callovian and the Oxfordian) include the megalosaurid theropod Eustreptospondylus, the sauropod Cetiosauriscus, the stegosaurs Lexovisaurus and Loricatosaurus, the ankylosaur Sarcolestes, and the iguanodontian Callovosaurus., with the poorly known ankylosaur Cryptosaurus also being known from Oxfordian aged sediments in Britain. During this time, Europe formed an archipelago of islands surrounded by shallow seas, explaining the findings of these dinosaurs in marine sediments.
