= Chuanjie Formation =

Geological formation in Yunnan, China

- Stratigraphic range: Aalenian-Bajocian; ~174–168.5 Ma
- Type: Geological formation
- Underlies: Laoluocun Formation
- Overlies: Lufeng Formation
- Thickness: 221 m (725 ft)

Lithology
- Primary: Mudstone, siltstone
- Other: Conglomerate

Location
- Coordinates: 25.0°N 102.1°E
- Approximate paleocoordinates: 25.1°N 108.6°E
- Region: Yunnan
- Country: China
- Extent: Yunnan Basin
- Chuanjie Formation (China) Chuanjie Formation (Yunnan)

The Chuanjie Formation (simplified Chinese: 川街组; traditional Chinese: 川街組; pinyin: Chuānjiē Zǔ), is a geological formation in Yunnan, China. It dates back to the Middle Jurassic. It was formerly referred to as being the lower member of the "Upper Lufeng" as opposed to the underlying "Lower Lufeng" now referred to as the Lufeng Formation. Tracks of theropods and sauropods, as well as thyreophorans are known from the formation.

== Fossil content ==
Color key: Taxon / Reclassified taxon / Taxon falsely reported as present / Dubious taxon or junior synonym / Ichnotaxon / Ootaxon / Morphotaxon	Notes; Uncertain or tentative taxa are in small text; ~~crossed out~~ taxa are discredited.

=== Dinosaurs ===
==== Sauropods ====
Sauropods of the Chuanjie Formation
Genus	Species	Location	Stratigraphic position	Material	Notes	Image
Analong	A. chuanjieensis	Quarry 1, Lao Chang Qing	Aalenian to Bajocian		A mamenchisaurid sauropod	
Chuanjiesaurus	C. anaensis	Quarry 1, Lao Chang Qing	Aalenian to Bajocian	"Partial postcranial skeleton".	A mamenchisaurid sauropod	

==== Theropods ====
Theropods of the Chuanjie Formation
Genus	Species	Location	Stratigraphic position	Material	Notes	Image
Shidaisaurus	S. jinae	Quarry 1, Lao Chang Qing	Aalenian	"Partial postcranial skeleton".	A metriacanthosaurine metriacanthosaurid	

=== Turtles ===
Turtles of the Chuanjie Formation
Genus	Species	Location	Stratigraphic position	Material	Notes	Image
Xinjiangchelys	X. oshanensis	Quarry 1, Lao Chang Qing	Aalenian to Bajocian		A xinjiangchelyid turtle	

=== Fish ===
==== Cartilaginous Fish ====
Cartilaginous Fish of the Chuanjie Formation
Genus	Species	Location	Stratigraphic position	Material	Notes	Image
Hybodus	H. chuanjieensis	Quarry 1, Lao Chang Qing	Aalenian to Bajocian		A hybodontid hybodont	
Hybodus	H. xinzhuangensis	Quarry 1, Lao Chang Qing	Aalenian to Bajocian		A hybodontid hybodont	

== See also ==
- List of dinosaur-bearing rock formations
