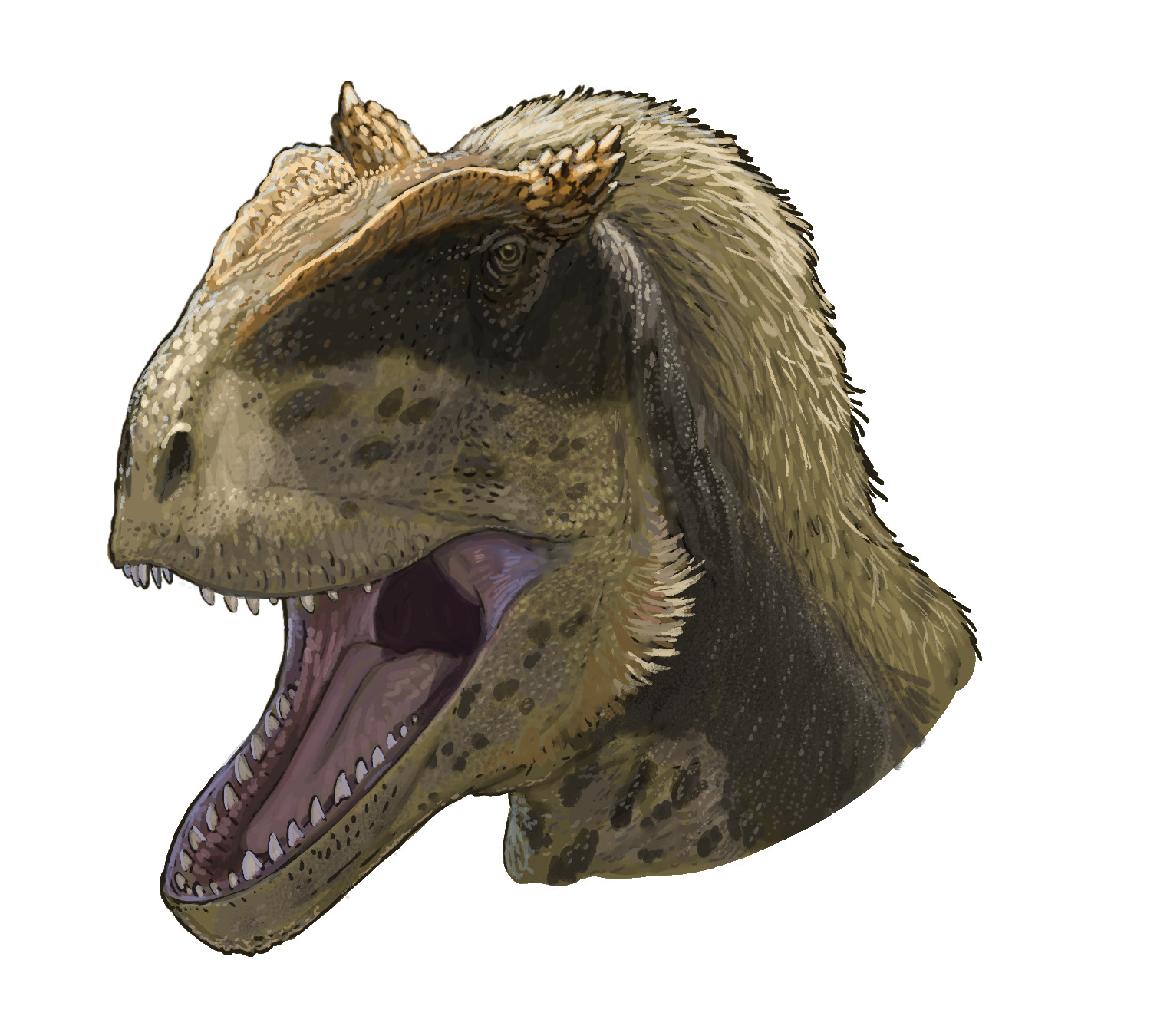
- Portrait of Alpkarakush

Scientific classification
- Kingdom: Animalia
- Phylum: Chordata
- Class: Reptilia
- Clade: Dinosauria
- Clade: Saurischia
- Clade: Theropoda
- Family: †Metriacanthosauridae
- Subfamily: †Metriacanthosaurinae
- Genus: †Alpkarakush; Rauhut et al., 2024
- Species: †A. kyrgyzicus

Binomial name
- †Alpkarakush kyrgyzicus Rauhut et al., 2024

= Alpkarakush =

Alpkarakush Temporal range: Middle Jurassic, Callovian

Genus of theropod dinosaurs

Alpkarakush is an extinct genus of metriacanthosaurid theropod dinosaurs from the Jurassic Balabansai Formation of Kyrgyzstan. The genus contains a single species, A. kyrgyzicus, known from a partial skeleton.

== Discovery and naming ==
The Alpkarakush fossil material was discovered in sediments of the Balabansai Formation ('FTU-1' locality) in the Uurusai Valley near Tashkumyr in Jalal-Abad Oblast of Kyrgyzstan. Initial fieldwork at the locality was conducted in 2005 and 2006, during which two partial theropod skeletons were found. Further excavations in 2014 recovered additional material, followed by later work in 2016 and 2017. A 2023 expedition revisited the site and found even more material, including teeth and isolated bones. At least two individual animals are represented by the recovered bones, both of which are assigned to Alpkarakush. The holotype specimen consists of skull bones (both postorbitals and a quadratojugal), several partial dorsal vertebrae and five sacral vertebrae, some ribs, a manual phalanx and ungual (digit bone and claw), much of the pelvic girdle, and most of the hindlimbs (femora, tibiae, left fibula, astragalocalcanea, a left tarsal, metatarsals, a pedal phalanx, and two pedal unguals). The paratype specimen belongs to a smaller individual and consists of a partial pelvic girdle and the right tibia. At least seven isolated teeth and a furcula were found nearby and assigned to Alpkarakush, although the association of some of the teeth with this taxon is only tentative. All of the fossil material is housed at the Institute of Geology's Paleontological Collection, associated with the Kyrgyz National Academy of Sciences.

In 2024, Rauhut et al. described Alpkarakush kyrgyzicus as a new genus and species of metriacanthosaurid theropod based on these fossil remains. The generic name, Alpkarakush is the name of a mythical powerful bird from the Epic of Manas. The specific name, kyrgyzicus, references the discovery of the taxon in the Kyrgyz Republic.

== Description ==
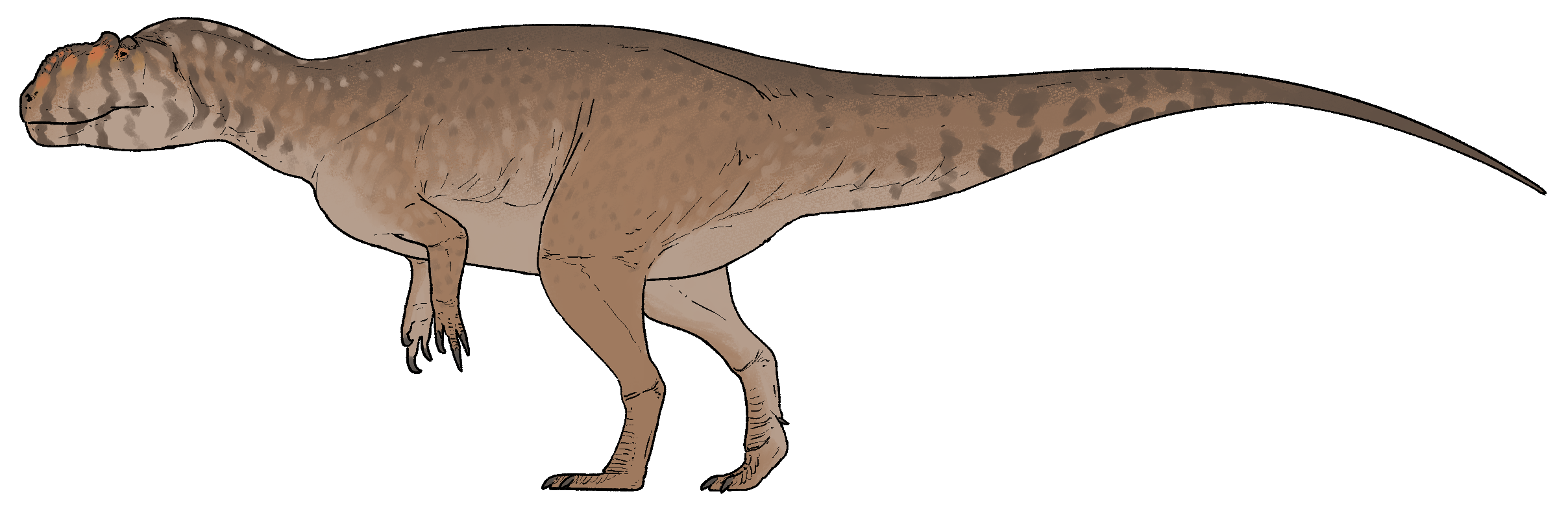
Restoration

As a metriacanthosaurid theropod, Alpkarakush is a relatively large predator characterized by a high, arched skull and generally slender hindlimbs. These taxa have a pronounced orbital brow—a decorative structure over the eye— which is especially apparent and rugose in Alpkarakush.

Alpkarakush has an estimated body length of 7–8 m (23–26 ft). Based on growth marks observed in the femur via histology, Rauhut et al. determined that the holotype (the larger of the two known specimens) was at least 17 years old when it died, and was likely still growing slowly. The smaller paratype was much younger when it died, either a large juvenile or possibly a small subadult.

== Classification ==
In their phylogenetic analyses, Rauhut et al. (2024) recovered as a basal member of the metriacanthosaurid clade Metriacanthosaurinae. Their results are displayed in the cladogram below:

- Carnosauria
  - Megalosauroidea
    - Piatnitzkysauridae
    - - Megalosauridae
      - Spinosauridae
  - Allosauroidea
    - - Allosauridae
      - Carcharodontosauria
    - Metriacanthosauridae
      - Shidaisaurus
      - - Yangchuanosaurus spp.
        - Metriacanthosaurinae
          - Alpkarakush
          - - Metriacanthosaurus
            - Siamotyrannus
            - Sinraptor
