= Miguel Telles Antunes =

Portuguese academic

GOIH Miguel Telles Antunes

Director of the Maynense Museum of the Lisbon Academy of Sciences

Personal details
- Born: Miguel Carlos Ferreira Telles Antunes; 11 January 1937 (age 89) Lisbon, Portugal
- Education: University of Lisbon

Dr. Miguel Telles Antunes GOIH (born 11 January 1937) is a Portuguese academic, specializing in paleontology, zooarchaeology, and geology. Antunes is a ranking member of various institutions, including the Lisbon Academy of Sciences, Nova University of Lisbon, and the Lourinhã Museum of Ethnology and Archaeology.

Antunes is the namesake of the scientific names of multiple species, from dinosaurs to insects, owing to his preeminence as the field of paleontology and archaeology, the most notable of which is the Lourinhanosaurus antunesi, a theropod dinosaur of the late Jurassic period.

== Career ==
Antunes is a ranking member of the Lisbon Academy of Sciences, Portugal's most eminent scientific scholarly society, Antunes serves as the director of the academy's Maynense Museum.

Antunes is a professor at the Nova University of Lisbon, where he previously served as chair of Nova's Sciences and Technology Department.

Antunes serves as a curator and member of Scientific Council of the Museum of Lourinhã.

=== Species named after Antunes ===
Numerous species, all extinct, are named after Antunes, including:

- Lourinhanosaurus antunesi, extinct late Jurassic theropod dinosaur
- Paragaleus antunesi, extinct weasel shark
- Cytherella antunesi, extinct ostracod of family Cytherellidae
- Diacodexis antunesi; extinct herbivore mammal of family Dichobunidae
- Fluviatilavis antunesi; extinct bird of order Charadriiformes
- Echinolampus antunesi; extinct echinoderm
- Gyraulus antunesi; extinct mollusk
- Equus caballus antunesi; extinct subspecies of horse

== Personal life ==
Miguel Carlos Ferreira Telles Antunes was born in Lisbon, Portugal, on 11 January 1937.

On 30 January 1965, he married Maria Salomé Soares Pais Telles Antunes, Secretary-General of the Lisbon Academy of Sciences and Secretary of the Academy Class of Letters, Portugal's highest linguistic governing body. The couple have two children: Helena Luísa Soares Pais Telles Antunes, M.D., a cardiothoracic surgeon and researcher, and Ana Isabel Soares Pais Telles Antunes Béreau, Ph. D., a preeminent concert pianist associated with New York University, Évora University and Lisbon's Amadores Academy of Music. The last married Jean-Sébastien Béreau, Jubilate Professor of the Paris Conservatory (CNSMDP).

== Published works ==
- (1976) Dinossáurios eocretácicos de Lagosteiros, Ciências da Terra 1:1-35.
- (1984). Novas pistas de Dinossáurios no cretácico inferior- Discussão. Comunicações dos Serviços Geológicos de Portugal. 70(1): 123-4.
- (1986). Sobre a história da Paleontologia em Portugal. Memórias da Academia de Ciências de Lisboa. II: 773-814.
- (1992) - Sobre a História da Paleontologia em Portugal (ca. 1919-1980). História e Desenvolvimento da Ciência em Portugal no séc. XX . Publicações do II Centenário da Academia das Ciências de Lisboa, p. 1003–1026, 18 fig.
- (1989). Sobre a História do Ensino da Geologia em Portugal. Comunicações dos Serviços Geológicos de Portugal, 75: 127-160.
- (1998). A new Upper Jurassic Paulchoffatiid Multituberculate (Mammalia) from Pai Mogo, Portugal / and a few comments on Walter Georg Kühne. Memórias da Academia de Ciências de Lisboa. 37:125-153.
- (1999). Dinossauros e Portugal: Dois casos menos conhecidos. Ciências da Terra 13.
- (1999). Veiga Ferreira e a Paleontologia em Portugal. Ciências da Terra (UNL), No. 13:157-167.
- (2000). Paleontologia e Portugal. Colóquio/ Ciência/ Revista de Cultura Científica, 25: 54 - 75, 50 fig. Fundação Calouste Gulbenkian, Lisboa.
- (2001). The earliest illustration of Dinosaur footprints. Proceedings of the INHIGEO Meeting, Portugal
