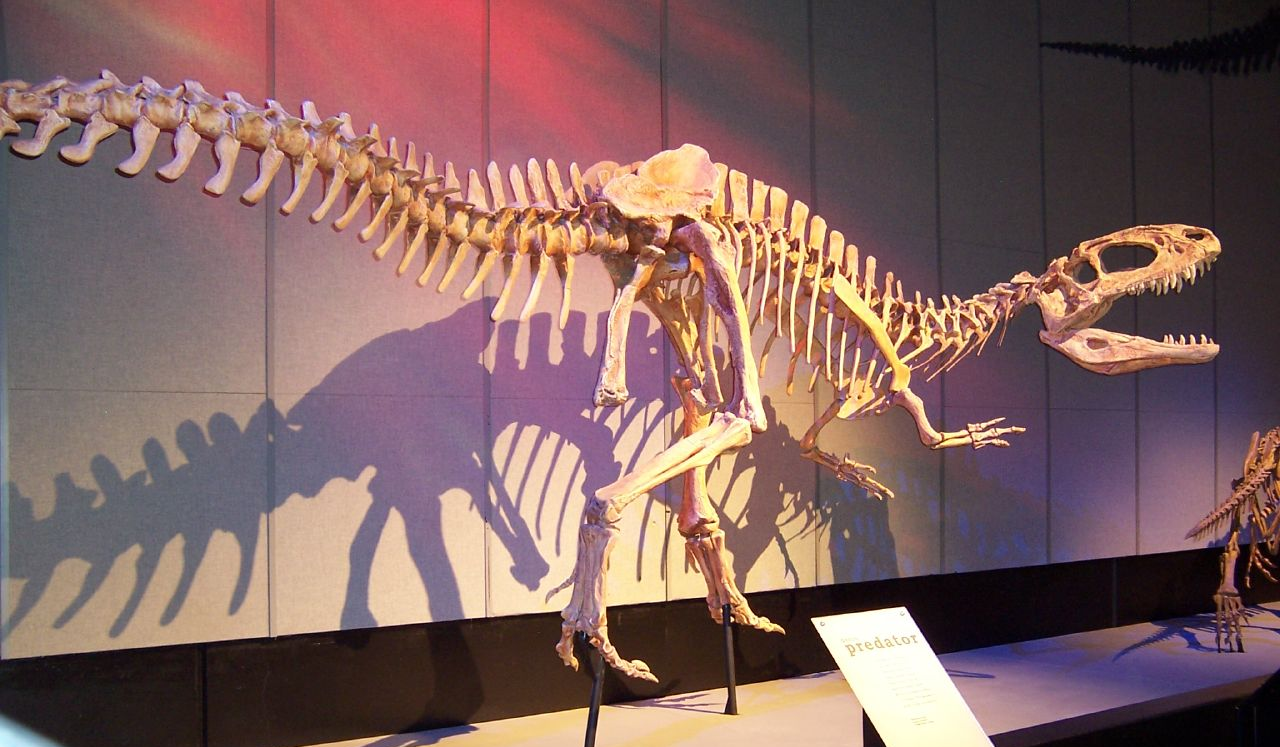
- Sinraptor dongi, Royal Tyrrell Museum

Scientific classification
- Kingdom: Animalia
- Phylum: Chordata
- Class: Reptilia
- Clade: Dinosauria
- Clade: Saurischia
- Clade: Theropoda
- Clade: †Carnosauria
- Superfamily: †Allosauroidea
- Family: †Metriacanthosauridae; Paul, 1988

Type species
- †Metriacanthosaurus parkeri Huene, 1923

Subgroups
- †Erectopus?; †Gasosaurus?; †Lourinhanosaurus?; †Poekilopleuron?; †Szechuanosaurus?; †Xuanhanosaurus?; †Yangchuanosaurus; †Yuanmouraptor; †Metriacanthosaurinae; †Alpkarakush; †Metriacanthosaurus; †Shidaisaurus; †Siamotyrannus; †Sinraptor

Synonyms
- Sinraptoridae Currie & Zhao, 1993

= Metriacanthosauridae =

Metriacanthosaurids Temporal range: Middle Jurassic-Early Cretaceous, 174–120 Ma Possible Albian record

Extinct family of dinosaurs

Metriacanthosauridae (Greek for "moderately-spined lizards") is an extinct family of allosauroid theropod dinosaurs that lived in Europe and Asia from the Middle Jurassic to the Early Cretaceous. The family is split into two subgroups: Metriacanthosaurinae, which includes dinosaurs closely related to Metriacanthosaurus, and another group composed of the close relatives of Yangchuanosaurus. Metriacanthosaurids are considered carnosaurs, belonging to the Allosauroidea superfamily. The group includes species of large range in body size. Of their physical traits, most notable are their neural spines. The records of the group are mostly confined to Asia, though Metriacanthosaurus is known from Europe. Metriacanthosauridae is used as a senior synonym of Sinraptoridae.

== Diagnostic traits ==
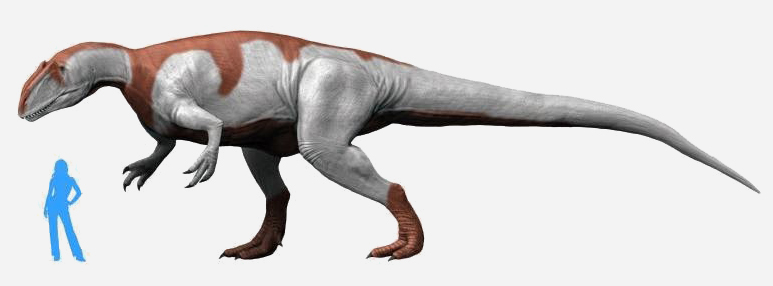
Life restoration of Yangchuanosaurus shangyouensis

Metriacanthosaurids share the following unambiguous synapomorphies among allosauroids:

- A short or absent anterior ramus of the maxilla (also found in carcharodontosaurids and piatnitzkysaurids).
- The laterosphenoid articulated on the frontal and postorbital.
- A squamosal without constriction of the lower temporal fenestra. (also found in megalosauroids)
- A flange on the squamosal covering the quadrate head laterally.
- A well-defined longitudinal groove on the lateral side of the dentary housing a row of neurovascular foramina.
- Broad, well developed spinopost-zygapophyseal lamina on the axis.
- A manus shorter than the forearm.
- Subrectangular and sheet-like neural spines of middle caudal vertebrae.
- A manus without digit V or the phalanges of digit IV (also found in neovenatorids).
- A heart-shaped cross section of the ilium's paired midshafts (also found in coelophysids).
- Fused distal end of the ischium (also found in neovenatorids and basal tetanurans).

Metriacanthosaurids share the following dental synapomorphies among theropods:

- surface centrally positioned on the labial surface of the crown roughly flattened in lateral teeth
- irregular and non-oriented enamel surface texture

Metriacanthosaurines share the following synapomorphies among metriacanthosaurids:

- The anteroventral border of the maxillary antorbital fenestra being demarcated by a raised ridge (also found in Eoraptor, coelophysids, Masiakasaurus, Marshosaurus, and Compsognathus).
- A pronounced ventral keel on the anterior dorsal vertebrae (also found in Condorraptor, Piatnitzkysaurus, Carcharodontosaurus and many megalosaurians).
- A straight posterior margin of the iliac postacetabular process.
- The angle between the long axes of the pubic shaft and boot being less than 60 degrees.
- A ventrally curved ischial shaft (also found in coelophysids, Eustreptospondylus, Afrovenator, Megalosaurus and Compsognathus).
- A bulbous fibular crest on the tibia (also found in Sinosaurus).

== Classification ==
Carrano, Benson & Sampson (2012) noted that the name Metriacanthosauridae should be used as it has priority over Sinraptoridae. Cladistically, Sinraptoridae had been latest defined in 2005 by Paul Sereno as the most inclusive monophyletic group that contains Sinraptor dongi and all species closer to Sinraptor than to either Allosaurus fragilis, Carcharodontosaurus saharicus, or the house sparrow (Passer domesticus).

Furthermore, the 2012 study named a new subfamily Metriacanthosaurinae to include all metriacanthosaurids more closely related to Metriacanthosaurus than to Yangchuanosaurus. A much larger phylogenetic analysis found Xuanhanosaurus, previously considered a basal megalosauroid, to be the basalmost metriacanthosaurid. Both Poekilopleuron and Lourinhanosaurus were recovered outside the family, and many taxa within the Metriacanthosauridae were in polytomy. However, the positions of Xuanhanosaurus and Poekilopleuron were very unstable, and their exclusion from the analysis gave a more resolved and stable cladogram. The cladogram presented here follows that study.

- Orionides
  - Megalosauroidea
  - Avetheropoda
    - Coelurosauria
      - Lourinhanosaurus
      - Other coelurosaurians
    - Allosauroidea
      - Allosauria
        - Allosauridae
        - Carcharodontosauria
          - Neovenatoridae
          - Carcharodontosauridae
      - Metriacanthosauridae
        - - Yangchuanosaurus zigongensis
          - - CV 00214
            - Yangchuanosaurus shangyouensis
        - Metriacanthosaurinae
          - Shidaisaurus
          - - Metriacanthosaurus
            - - "Sinraptor" hepingensis
              - - Sinraptor dongi
                - Siamotyrannus

== Palaeobiogeography ==
Metriacanthosauridae fossils have only been found in modern Europe and Asia, parts of the prehistoric landmass Laurasia. The biogeographic origin of metriacanthosaurids based on phylogenetic analysis is suggested to be South-East Asia, specified as "Chinese provinces of Sichuan and Yunnan and areas south of this", and the earliest known taxa are Shidaisaurus from southern China and Alpkarakush from Kyrgyzstan. Fragmentary remains of allosauroids from the late Middle-early Late Jurassic Marnes de Dives in northern France bear close similarities to metriocanthosaurids, and may belong to members of the group.
