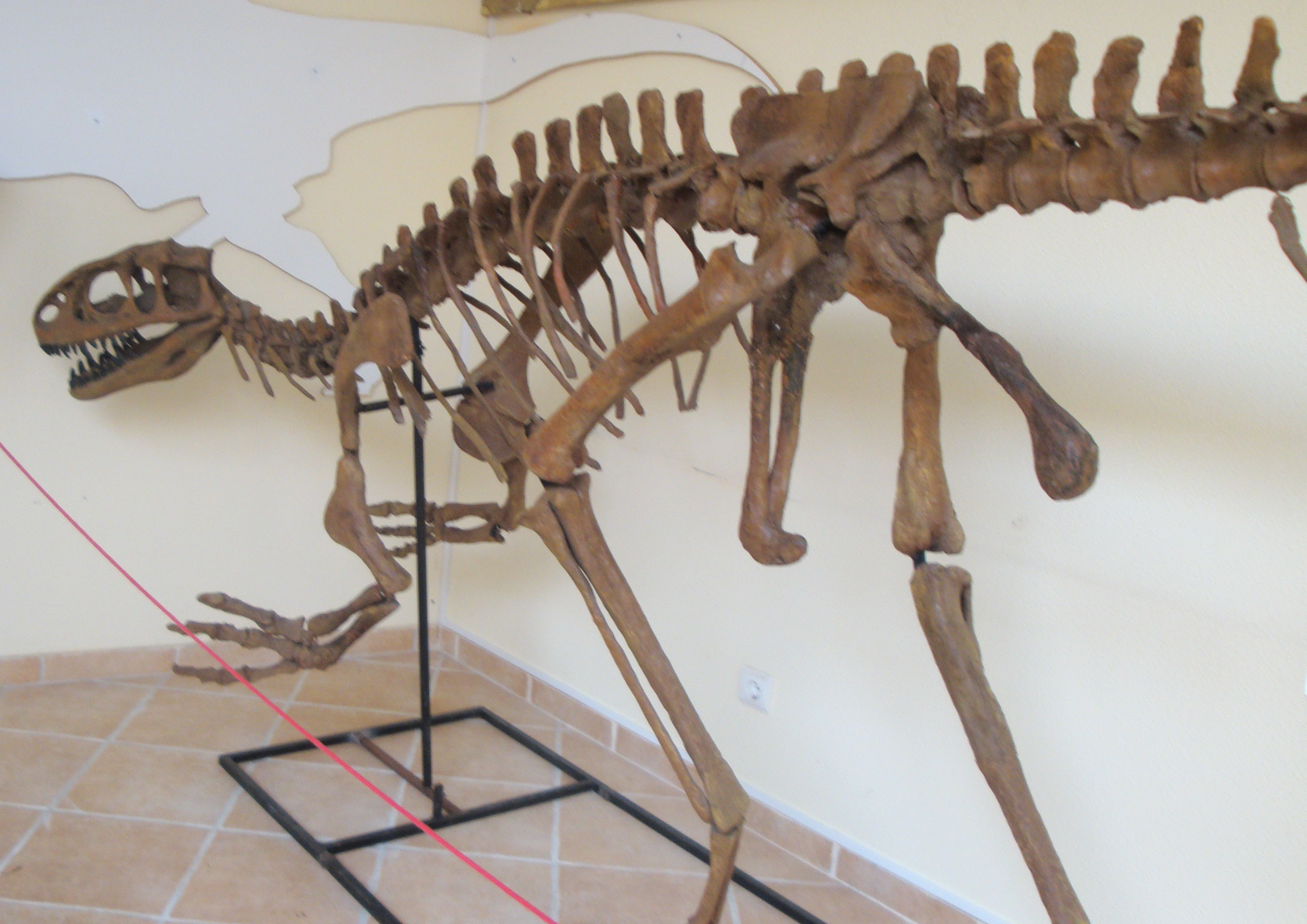
- Reconstructed skeleton, Museum of Lourinhã

Scientific classification
- Kingdom: Animalia
- Phylum: Chordata
- Class: Reptilia
- Clade: Dinosauria
- Clade: Saurischia
- Clade: Theropoda
- Clade: Orionides
- Clade: Avetheropoda
- Genus: †Lourinhanosaurus; Mateus, 1998
- Species: †L. antunesi

Binomial name
- †Lourinhanosaurus antunesi Mateus, 1998

= Lourinhanosaurus =

Lourinhanosaurus Temporal range: Late Jurassic, 150 Ma

Extinct genus of dinosaurs

Lourinhanosaurus (meaning "Lourinhã lizard") was a genus of carnivorous theropod dinosaur that lived during the Late Jurassic Period (Kimmeridgian/Tithonian) in Portugal. It is one of many large predators discovered at the Lourinhã Formation and probably competed with coeval Torvosaurus gurneyi, Allosaurus europaeus, and Ceratosaurus.

== Discovery and naming ==
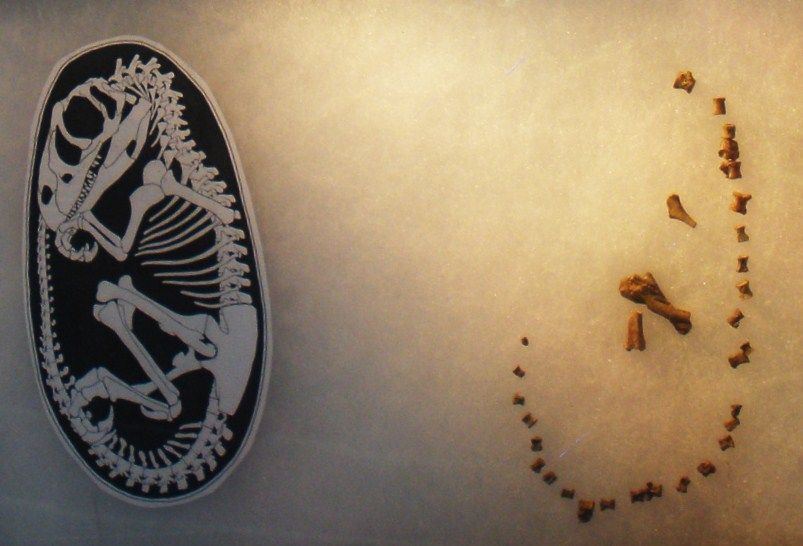
Fetus restoration and bone fragments

Its first remains were found at Peralta, near Lourinhã, Portugal in 1982, but were not described until 1998, by Portuguese paleontologist Octávio Mateus. Its type (and to date only) species is L. antunesi, in honour of Portuguese paleontologist Miguel Telles Antunes.

Fossils of Lourinhasaurus are stored at Museu da Lourinhã. To date, the most complete known specimen of L. antunesi is the holotype, ML 370, which is a partial skeleton. It consists of the six cervical (neck) vertebrae with six ribs, five sacral (hip) vertebrae with ribs, 14 caudal (tail) vertebrae, eight chevrons, both femora, right tibia and fibula, one metatarsus, two ilia, and both pubes and ischia, as well as an associated 32 gastroliths. A femur (ML 555) found at Porto das Barcas (Lourinhã Formation; Late Jurassic) has also been referred to L. antunesi.

Besides these specimens, around 100 eggs (collectively described as specimen ML 565), some of them containing embryonic bones and skin, have been found in 1993 at the nearby beach of Paimogo. These were in 2001 assigned to L. antunesi.

== Paleobiology ==
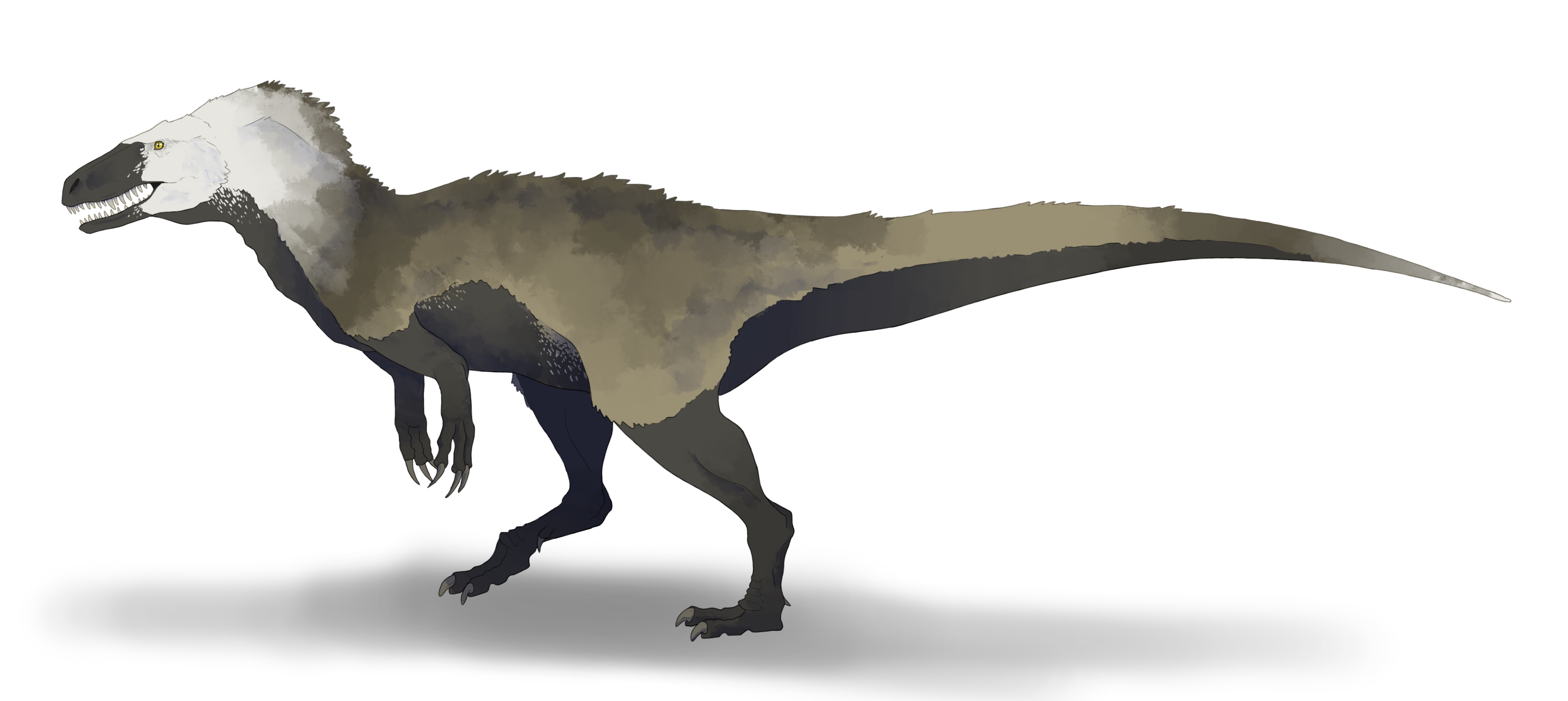
Speculative life restoration of Lourinhanosaurus based on ML 370 and skeletal reconstructions

The subadult holotype compared to a human

L. antunesi holotype was a sub-adult. Histology shows that the holotype specimen was between 14 and 17 years old. L. antunesi is estimated to be 4–6 metres (13–20 ft) in length.

Though gastroliths have been found in other theropods since the description of L. antunesi, this was the first theropod dinosaur for which this kind of remains have been assigned. It was concluded during the description that these stones belonged to the animal, and were not swallowed while eating a herbivorous dinosaur.

Dinosaur eggs and embryos, believed to be those of Lourinhanosaurus, have also been discovered; a nest containing more than 100 eggs, some with well-preserved embryos, was announced in 1998.

== Classification ==
The relationships of Lourinhanosaurus to other theropods have been uncertain, and no firm consensus has been reached as to its classification. Initially regarded as a primitive member of Allosauroidea, it was later discussed as being closely related to Sinraptoridae (Metriacanthosauridae), a more inclusive clade within Allosauroidea. Since the original description, some researchers have been favourable to the idea that L. antunesi is not even an allosauroid, but in fact a member of Megalosauroidea, a more basal group of tetanuran theropods. Benson et al. (2010) found it and Poekilopleuron to belong to Sinraptoridae. Carrano et al. (2012) found it to be a coelurosaur. A 2022 study mentions it as a "putative metriacanthosaurid".

Cau (2024) recovered Lourinhanosaurus as an Allosauroid not inside of any family, forming a clade with Aorun. A simplified version of the cladogram is shown below.

- Allosauroidea
  - Monolophosaurus
  - - Metriacanthosauridae
    - - Lourinhanosaurus
      - Aorun
      - - Allosaurus
        - Carcharodontosauridae
