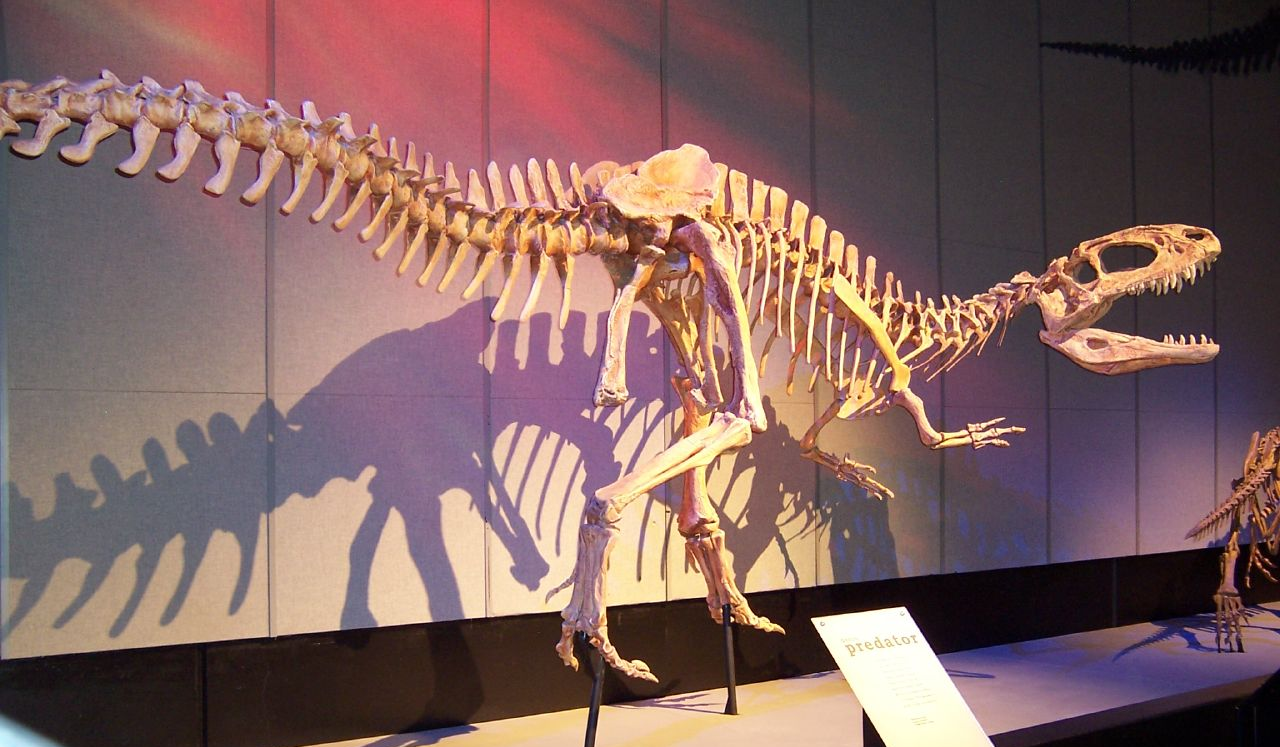
- S. dongi, Royal Tyrrell Museum

Scientific classification
- Kingdom: Animalia
- Phylum: Chordata
- Class: Reptilia
- Clade: Dinosauria
- Clade: Saurischia
- Clade: Theropoda
- Family: †Metriacanthosauridae
- Subfamily: †Metriacanthosaurinae
- Genus: †Sinraptor; Currie and Zhao, 1994

Type species
- †Sinraptor dongi Currie and Zhao, 1994

Other species
- †S. hepingensis? (Gao, 1992)

Synonyms
- Synonyms of S. dongi: Yangchuanosaurus dongi (Currie and Zhao, 1994) Gao, 1999; Synonyms of S. hepingensis: Yangchuanosaurus hepingensis Gao, 1992

= Sinraptor =

Sinraptor Temporal range: Late Jurassic, (Oxfordian) 160 Ma

Extinct genus of dinosaurs

Sinraptor (/sɪnˈræptər/) is a genus of metriacanthosaurid theropod dinosaur from the Late Jurassic Shishugou Formation of China. Sinraptor and its close relatives were among the earliest members of the Jurassic carnosaurian radiation. Sinraptor still remains the best-known member of the family Metriacanthosauridae, with some older sources even using the name "Sinraptoridae" for the family.

== Discovery and naming ==
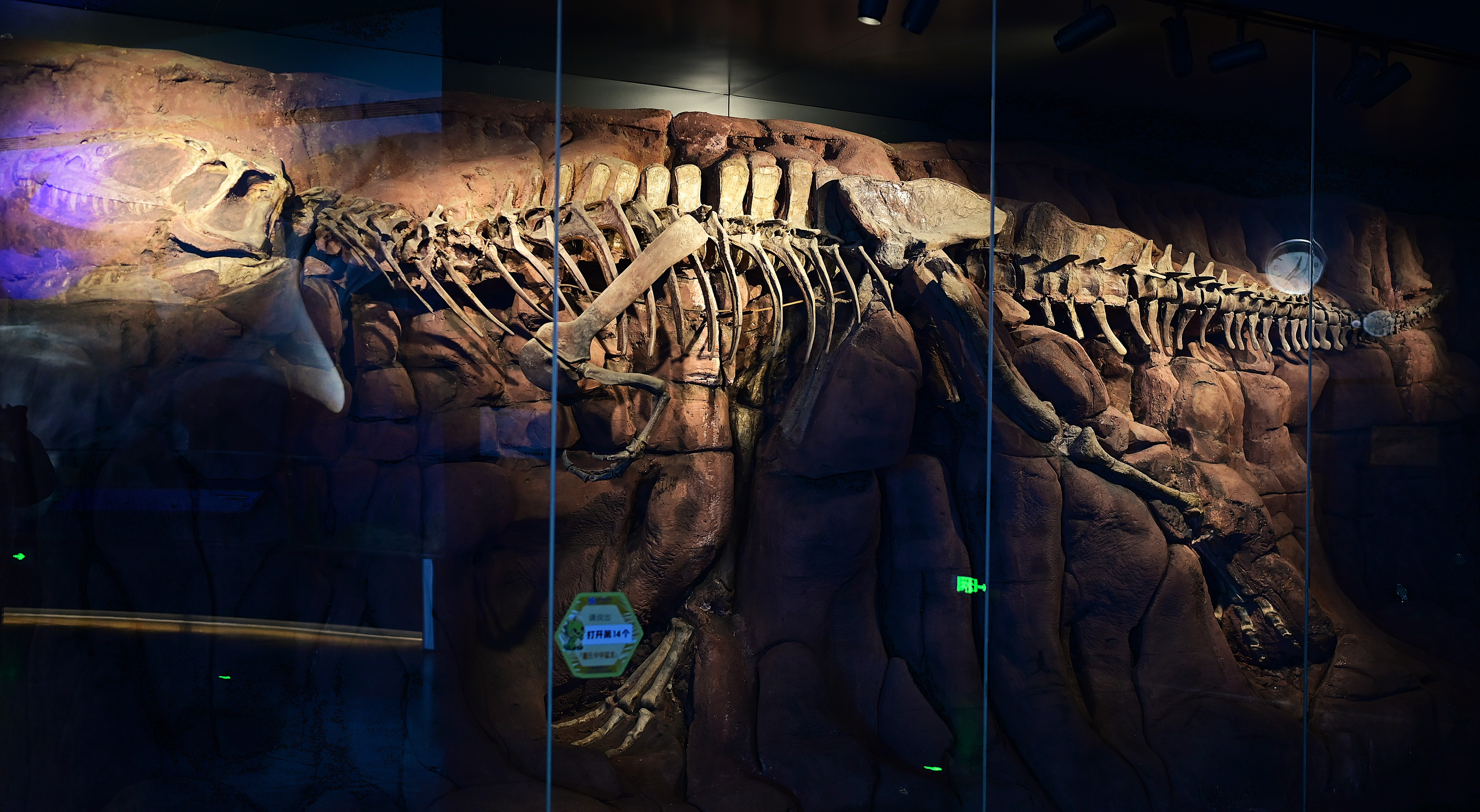
Holotype skeleton (IVPP 10600) of S. dongi

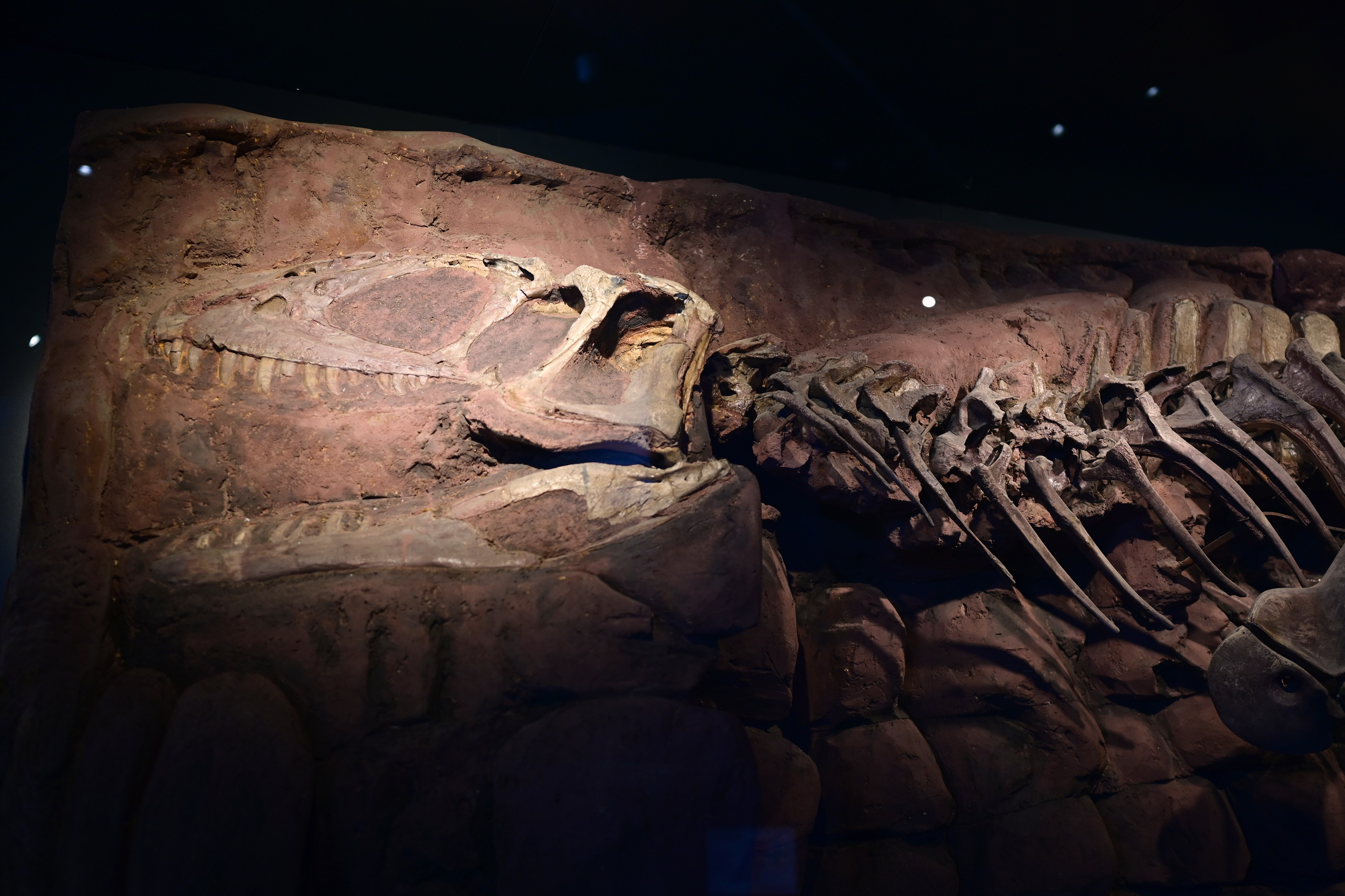
Skull of specimen IVPP 10600

The holotype specimen of Sinraptor was uncovered from the Shishugou Formation during a joint Chinese/Canadian expedition to the northwestern Chinese desert in 1987 and described by Philip J. Currie and Zhao Xijin in 1994. Standing nearly 3 meters (9.8 feet) tall and measuring roughly 7.6 meters (25 feet) in length, two species of Sinraptor have been named. S. dongi, the type species, was described by Currie and Zhao in 1994. A second species, originally named Yangchuanosaurus hepingensis by Gao in 1992, may actually represent a second species of Sinraptor. Whether or not this is the case, Sinraptor and Yangchuanosaurus were close relatives and are classified together in the family Metriacanthosauridae.

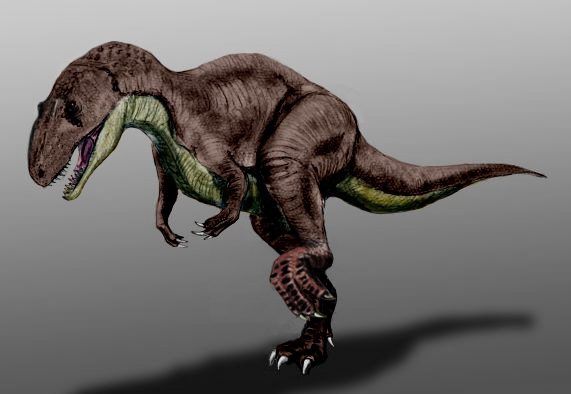
Life restoration of S. dongi

The name Sinraptor comes from the Latin prefix "Sino", meaning Chinese, and "raptor", meaning robber. The specific name dongi honours Dong Zhiming. Despite its name, Sinraptor is not related to dromaeosaurids (often nicknamed "raptors") like Velociraptor. Instead, it was a carnosaur distantly related to Allosaurus.

== Description ==
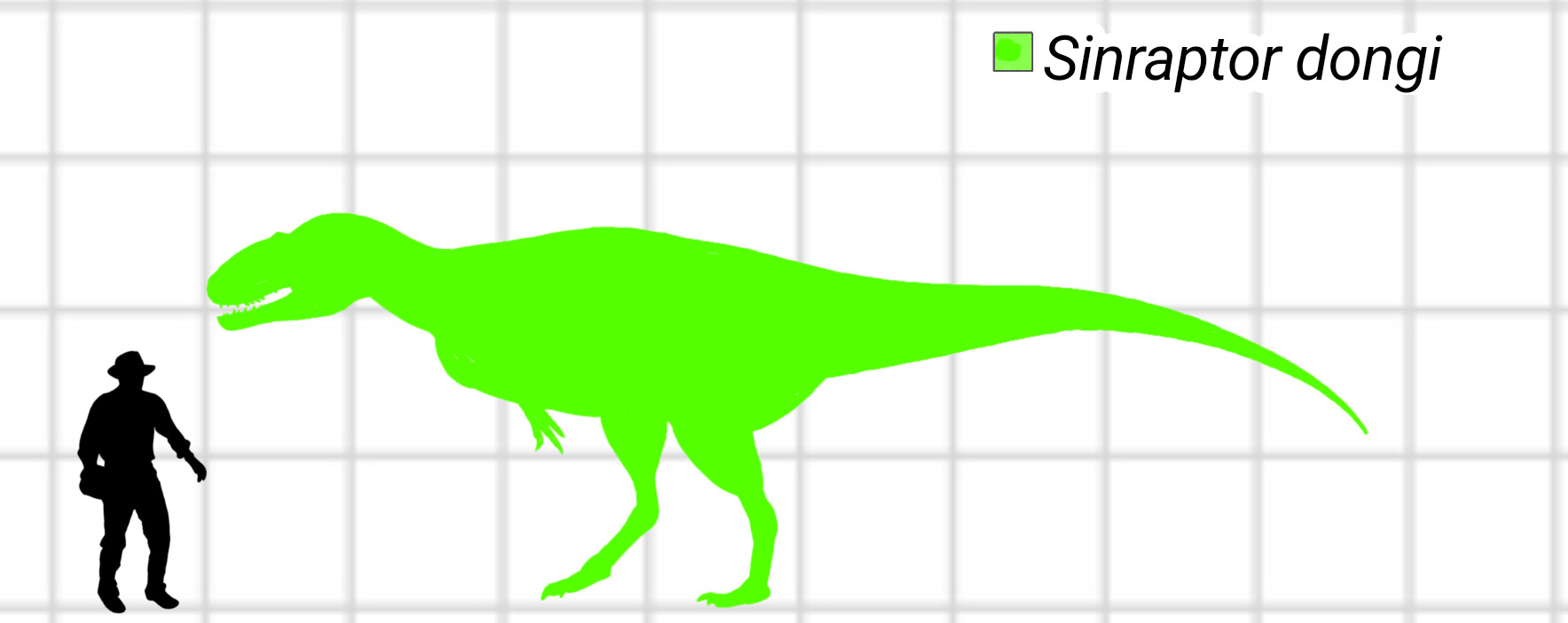
Size of Sinraptor dongi compared to a human

Gregory S. Paul proposed that S. dongi would reach 8 metres (26 ft) in length and 1.3 metric tons (1.4 short tons) in body mass, while Holtz estimated it to be 8.8 metres (29 ft) in length. A massive tooth measuring 10 centimetres (3.9 in) in length was found from the same stratigraphic level as Sinraptor and possibly belonged to this taxon. If the tooth belonged to Sinraptor, then it would have been one of the largest theropods of the Jurassic, with this specimen possibly measuring up to 12 metres (39 ft) in length. The skull length is estimated at 90 centimetres (35 in). The holotype of S. dongi was a subadult and thus not fully grown.

The dentition of Sinraptor was very similar to that of Allosaurus and indicated that it likely would have preyed upon medium-sized dinosaurs such as stegosaurs (such as Jiangjunosaurus junggarensis) by using its blade-like teeth to inflict massive, fatal wounds.

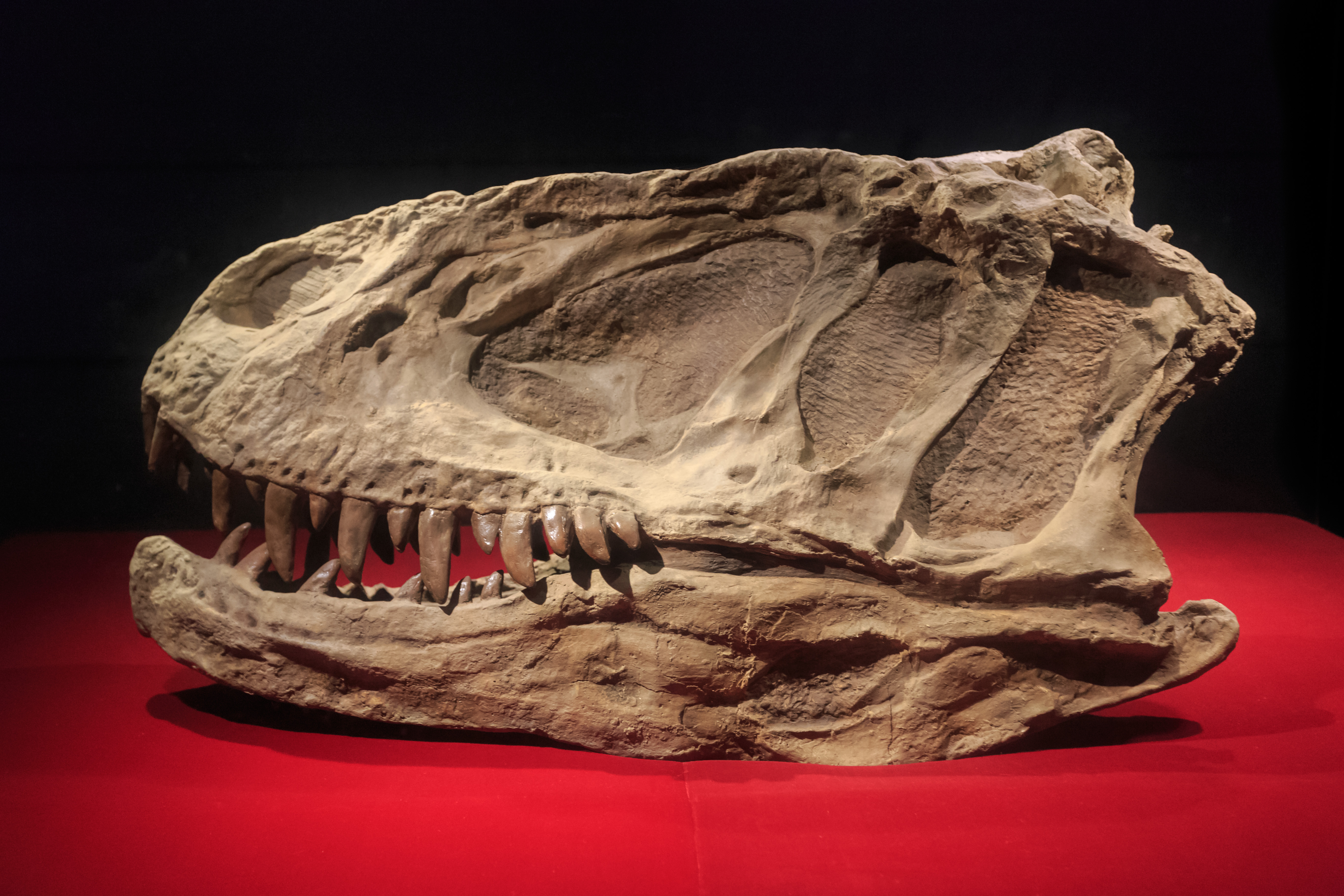
Skull of S. hepingensis at the Zigong Dinosaur Museum

== Classification ==
Sinraptor hepingensis, formerly referred to as Yangchuanosaurus, is a second species referred to this genus. However, the identity of this species within Sinraptor is questioned by other paleontologists, and the describers of Alpkarakush included this species within Yangchuanosaurus based on their phylogenetic analysis in 2024.

== Paleopathology ==
Sinraptor dongi skull specimen IVPP 10600 exhibits "a variety of gently curving tooth drags or gouges, shallow, circular punctures and one fully penetrating lesion." One rib was broken and healed via telescoping of its capitular shaft.
