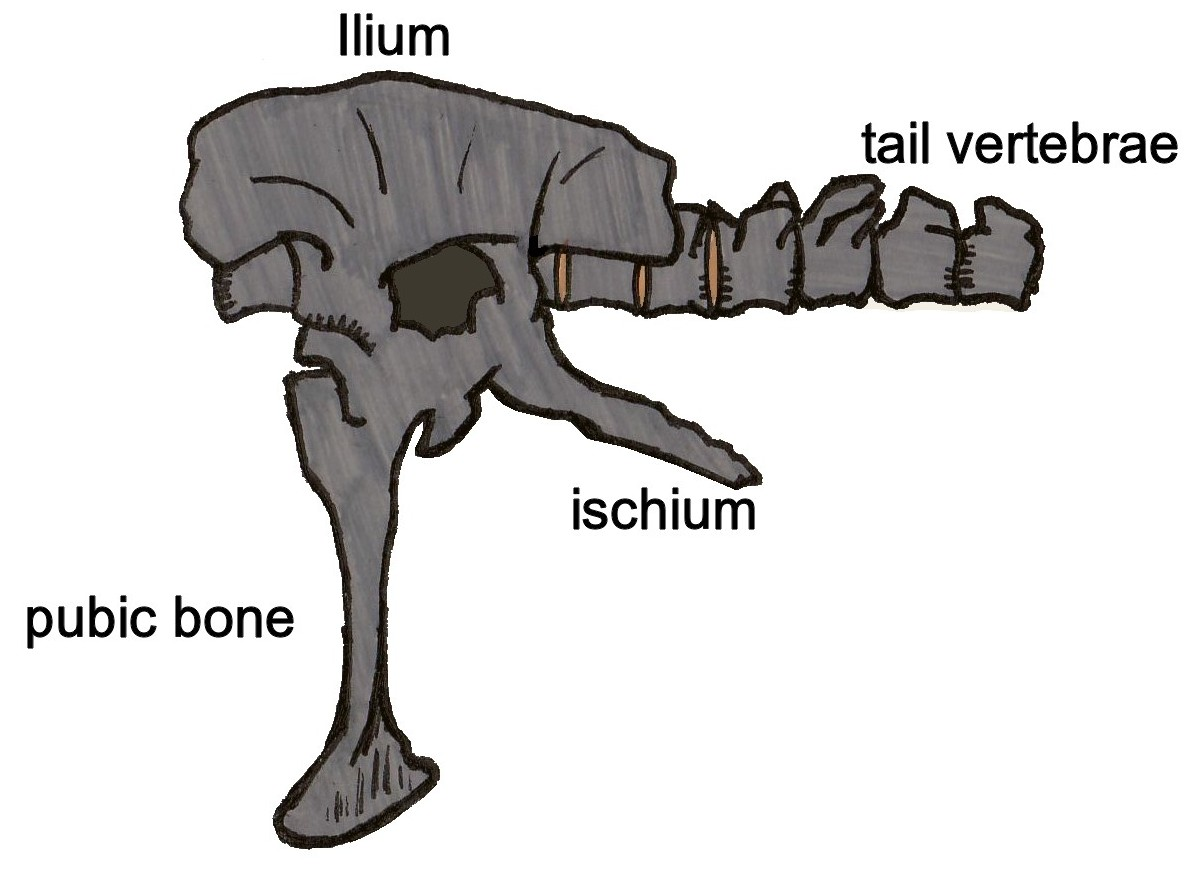
- Illustration of the pelvic bones and tail vertebrae

Scientific classification
- Kingdom: Animalia
- Phylum: Chordata
- Class: Reptilia
- Clade: Dinosauria
- Clade: Saurischia
- Clade: Theropoda
- Clade: Avetheropoda
- Genus: †Siamotyrannus; Buffetaut, Suteethorn & Tong, 1996
- Species: †S. isanensis

Binomial name
- †Siamotyrannus isanensis Buffetaut, Suteethorn & Tong, 1996

= Siamotyrannus =

Siamotyrannus Temporal range: Early Cretaceous, Berriasian–Barremian, 145–120 Ma

Extinct genus of dinosaurs

Siamotyrannus (meaning "Siamese tyrant") is a genus of possibly allosauroid theropod dinosaur from the Early Cretaceous Sao Khua Formation of Thailand.

== Discovery and naming ==
In 1993, Somchai Traimwichanon found a partial skeleton of a large theropod at the Phu Wiang 9 site in Khon Kaen.

In 1996, Eric Buffetaut, Varavudh Suteethorn and Haiyan Tong named and described the type species Siamotyrannus isanensis. The generic name is derived from the old Thai kingdom of Siam, and a Latinised Greek tyrannus, meaning "tyrant", in reference to a presumed membership of the Tyrannosauridae. The specific name is derived from Thai isan, "northeastern part", referring to the provenance from northeast Thailand.

The holotype, PW9-1, was found in the Sao Khua Formation, dating from the Berriasian-Barremian. It includes the left half of the pelvis, five rear dorsal vertebrae, the sacrum with five sacrals, and thirteen front tail vertebrae. In 1998, a tibia and some individual teeth were referred to the species.

== Description ==
Siamotyrannus is a large theropod. Buffetaut estimated its length at seven meters. In 2010, Gregory S. Paul estimated the length at 6 meters (20 ft), the weight at 500 kg. In 2016 Molina-Pérez and Larramendi gave a higher estimation of 10 meters (33 ft) and 1.75 tonnes (1.93 short tons). A possible autapomorphy, unique derived trait, is the possession of two vertical ridges on the ilium. The second and third sacrals are strongly transversely flattened.

== Classification ==
As evidenced by its name, it was originally thought to be a tyrannosauroid and even a tyrannosaurid, though due to lacking some of the primary tyrannosauroid synapomorphies that define the clade, its position there is not certain. Some analyses have categorized Siamotyrannus as a primitive carnosaur rather than a basal tyrannosauroid, and it has several features that may determine it to be an allosaurid or a sinraptorid. In 2012 Matthew Carrano et al. found a position in the Metriacanthosaurinae. Later studies consider its position uncertain within Avetheropoda, finding it to be either an allosauroid or a primitive coelurosaur. In his 2024 review of theropod relationships, Cau recovered it as a tetanuran outside of the Orionides, as a close relative of Siamraptor. In the same year, the describers of Alpkarakush included Siamotyrannus within Metriacanthosauridae based on their phylogenetic analysis.
