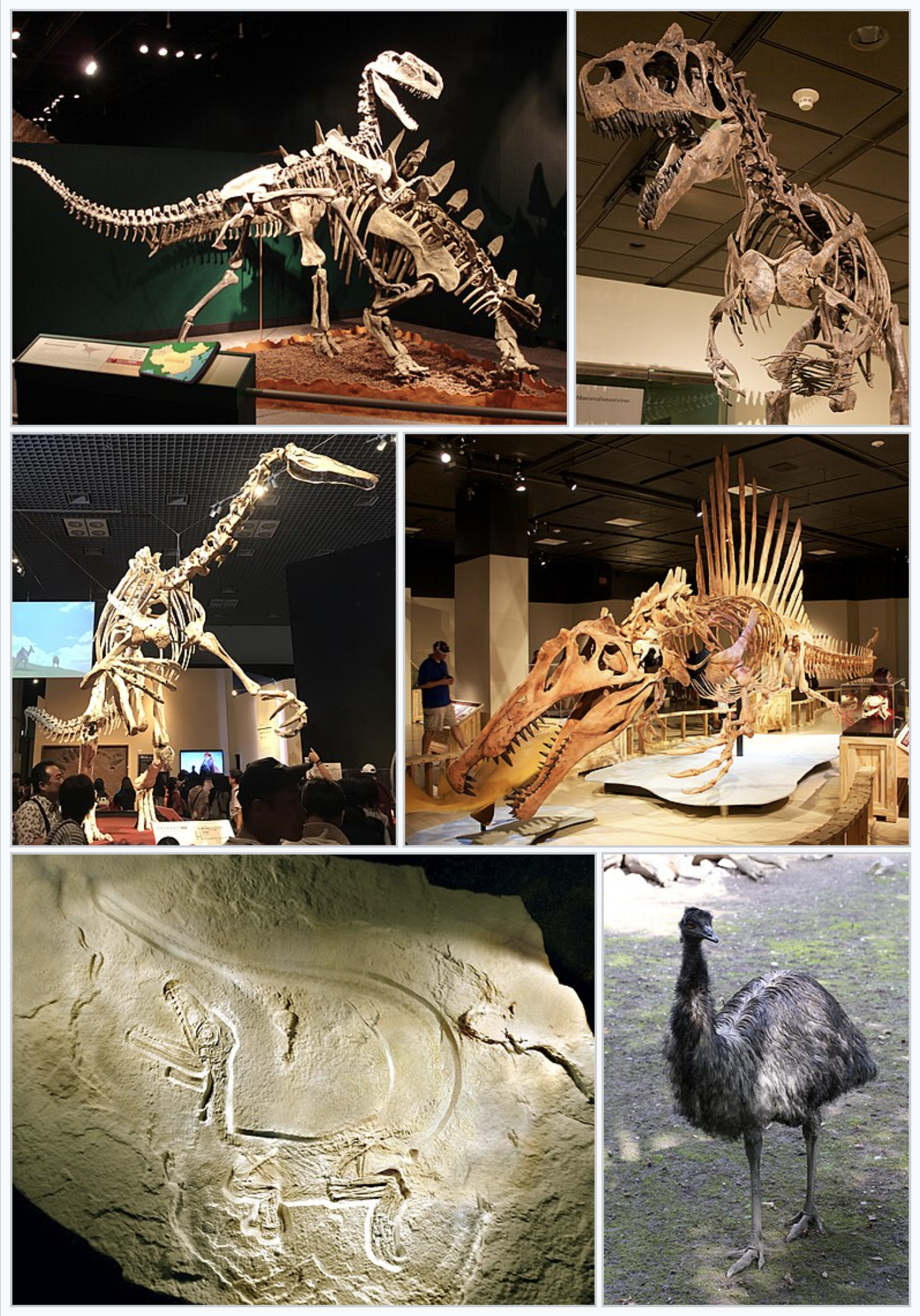
- Six tetanurans (top left to bottom right): Monolophosaurus in combat with non-tetanuran dinosaur Tuojiangosaurus, Allosaurus, Deinocheirus, Spinosaurus, Sciurumimus, and an emu

Scientific classification
- Kingdom: Animalia
- Phylum: Chordata
- Class: Reptilia
- Clade: Dinosauria
- Clade: Saurischia
- Clade: Theropoda
- Clade: Averostriformes
- Clade: Averostra
- Clade: Tetanurae; Gauthier, 1986

Subgroups
- †Chilesaurus?
- †Chuandongocoelurus?
- †Cryolophosaurus?
- †Dandakosaurus?
- †Dornraptor?
- †Kaijiangosaurus
- †Kakuru?
- †Kayentavenator
- †Monolophosaurus
- †Pandoravenator
- †Sinosaurus?
- †Vectaerovenator
- Orionides Carrano et al., 2012
  - †Megalosauroidea (possibly paraphyletic)
  - Avetheropoda Paul, 1988
    - †Carnosauria
    - Coelurosauria
Tetanurans of uncertain affinity
- †Altispinax
- †Aorun
- †Chilantaisaurus
- †Cruxicheiros
- †Datanglong
- †Gasosaurus
- †Juravenator
- †Lourinhanosaurus
- †Scipionyx
- †Sciurumimus
- †Shaochilong
- †Siamotyrannus
- †Siats
- †Ulughbegsaurus
- †Zuolong
- †Megaraptora
- †Piatnitzkysauridae

Synonyms
- Avetheropoda? Paul, 1988; Avipoda Novas, 1992; Neotetanurae? Sereno, 1999; Orionides? Carrano et al., 2012

= Tetanurae =

Tetanurans Temporal range: Early Jurassic–Present, 201–0 Ma

Clade containing most theropod dinosaurs

Tetanurae (/ˌtɛtəˈnjuːriː/; meaning "stiff tails") is a clade that includes most theropod dinosaurs, including megalosauroids, allosauroids, and coelurosaurs (which includes tyrannosauroids, ornithomimosaurs, compsognathids and maniraptorans, the latter including living birds). Tetanurans are defined as all theropods more closely related to modern birds than to Ceratosaurus and contain the majority of predatory dinosaur diversity. Tetanurae likely diverged from its sister group, Ceratosauria, during the late Triassic. Tetanurae first appeared in the fossil record by the Early Jurassic about 190 mya and by the Middle Jurassic had become globally distributed.

The group was named by Jacques Gauthier in 1986 and originally had two main subgroups: Carnosauria and Coelurosauria, the clade containing birds and related dinosaurs such as compsognathids, tyrannosaurids, ornithomimosaurs, and maniraptorans. The original Carnosauria was a polyphyletic group including any large carnivorous theropod. Many of Gauthier's carnosaurs, such as tyrannosaurids, have since been re-classified as coelurosaurs or primitive tetanurans. Carnosauria has been reclassified as a group containing allosaurids that split from the Coelurosauria at the Neotetanurae/Avetheropoda node. Members of Megalosauroidea are believed to represent basal tetanurans, but recent discoveries have shown that they might be members of Carnosauria expanding Carnosauria back to its original meaning. It is however agreed that Megalosauroids, Allosauroids and Coelurosaurians are all members of the Orionides, a subset within Tetanurae that contains dinosaurs more derived than animals such as Chuandongcoelurus and Kayentavenator.

Tetanuran evolution was characterized by parallel diversification of multiple lineages, repeatedly attaining large body size and similar locomotor morphology. Cryolophosaurus has been claimed as the first true member of the group, but subsequent studies have disagreed on whether it is a dilophosaurid or tetanuran. Arcucci and Coria (2003) classified Zupaysaurus as an early tetanuran, but it was later placed as a sister taxon to the clade containing dilophosaurids, ceratosaurs, and tetanurans.

Shared tetanuran features include a ribcage indicating a sophisticated air-sac-ventilated lung system similar to that in modern birds. This character would have been accompanied by an advanced circulatory system. Other tetanuran characterizing features include the absence of the fourth digit of the hand, placement of the maxillary teeth anterior to the orbit, a strap-like scapula, maxillary fenestrae, and stiffened tails. During the Late Jurassic and Early Cretaceous, large spinosaurids and allosaurs flourished but possibly died out in the northern hemisphere before the end of the Cretaceous, and were replaced as apex predators by tyrannosauroid coelurosaurs. At least in South America, carcharodontosaurid allosaurs may have persisted until the end of the Mesozoic Era, and died out at the same time as the non-avian coelurosaurs.

== Morphology ==
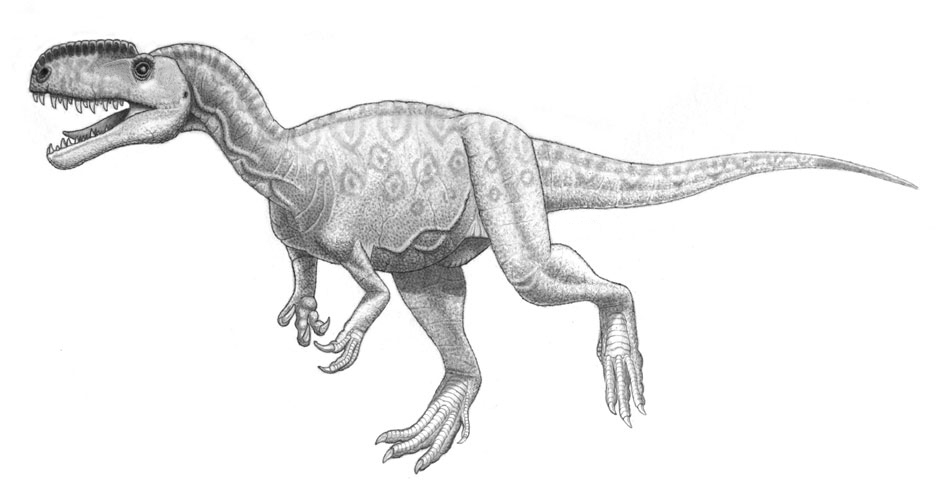
Illustration of Monolophosaurus jiangi

=== Anatomy ===
Tetanurans have two basic skull morphologies. The first skull type, typical in large theropods such as Allosaurus, is common within ceratosaurs and may be primitive for tetanurans. In this type, the skull is about three times longer than tall, with a blunter snout and frequent elaborations such as horns or spikes along the lacrimals, nasals, and frontals. In the second skull type, the skull is lower and longer, with a less elaborated skull roof and a more elongated snout. Shared tetanuran features include the maxillary fenestra (an opening in the antorbital fossa), a pneumatic excavation in the jugal, and the position of the maxillary teeth anterior to the orbit. The posterior skull is little modified in tetanurans, except within Spinosauridae. The presence of an antorbital tooth row in tetanurans may be associated with macropredatory habits.

In the postcranial skeleton, tetanurans transition between the most primitive theropod morphologies in basal tetanurans towards more derived, bird-like states in coelurosaurs. Most tetanurans possess specialized wrist bones, the absence or reduction of the fourth digit of the hand, a strap-like scapula, stiffened tails, and a laminar astragalar ascending process. Advanced tetanurans would have possessed a sophisticated air-sac-ventilated lung system similar to birds, and an advanced circulatory system. In megalosaurids and allosaurids, the orientation of the femoral head is anteromedial such as in ceratosaurs, but in avetheropods this orientation is fully medial. Tetanuran locomotor morphology is relatively generalized, with few variations between taxa.

The hands of tetanurans, unlike those of the closely related ceratosaurs, lack a fourth finger. Early tetanurans still possessed metacarpal IV, but it was vestigial and not part of a finger anymore. The tridactyl manus was preserved in birds. Evidence from the basal ceratosaur Saltriovenator indicates the tetanuran digits are I, II and III instead of II, III and IV.

=== Body Size ===
Basal tetanurans were the first theropods to achieve truly giant body sizes, with both megalosauroid and allosauroid taxa weighing over 1 ton. Sequential temporal appearances of large body size in subsequent clades suggest a pattern of size-cycles, with the extinction of incumbent giant forms allowing for replacement with a new, more bird-like theropod group that then also evolved giant body size. It is, however, possible that more than one giant tetanuran existed at a time in the same paleoenvironment, perhaps with feeding habit variations. Within most dinosaur clades, body size tended to increase over time along a lineage according to Cope's rule. Coelurosaurian theropods are the notable exception to the pattern of body size increases.

== History of study ==
=== History of classification ===
Tetanurae was recognized and named by Gauthier in 1986. The earliest-discovered non-avian tetanuran is Megalosaurus. For a century after the description of Megalosaurus, most large carnivorous dinosaurs were serially arrayed into the family Megalosauridae within the order Theropoda. In 1914, Friedrich von Huene separated small, lightly built forms into the infraorder Coelurosauria and larger taxa into the infraorder Pachypodosauria. Later, he transferred large, carnivorous taxa to the new infraorder Carnosauria, which came to include all known large-bodied carnivores other than Ceratosaurus. The size-based arrangement persisted until Gauthier, who redefined Carnosauria and Coelurosauria based on new cladistic analyses but retained the terms. Gauthier defined Coelurosauria as a taxon comprising birds and theropods closer to birds than to Carnosauria, and listed within Carnosauria several large-bodied theropod taxa but did not formally define the group. Many of these original carnosaurs have since been reclassified as coelurosaurs or primitive tetanurans, and Carnosauria has now been defined as Allosaurus and all Avetheropods closer to Allosaurus than to birds.

Initial cladistics studies supported the arrangement of primitive megalosaurs as serial outgroups to a clade of allosaurids, followed by the Coelurosauria. Subsequent studies have discovered that many of these basal tetanurans formed a true clade, termed Megalosauroidea or alternatively Spinosauroidea.

=== Current phylogeny ===
Current phylogeny agrees on a monophyletic Tetanurae that includes a series of generally large-bodied basal taxa outside a monophyletic Coelurosauria. Coelophysoids are basal to Tetanurae, with Ceratosauria forming a sister taxa that diverged during the late Triassic.

After their initial appearance, Tetanurae radiated into two main clades, Spinosauroidea or Megalosauroidea and Avetheropoda or Neotetanurae. Spinosauroidea are believed to represent basal Tetanurans. At the Neotetanurae/Avetheropoda node, allosaurids split from the Coelurosauria. Tyrannosauridae has been placed within Coelurosauria. The allosaurids and their closest relatives form a reconstituted Carnosauria. Debate persists about whether the allosaurids form a clade with spinosauroids/megalosauroids, and whether Allosauroidea belongs in Avetheropoda with Coelurosauria or forms a sister taxa to Megalosauroidea, and whether Megalosauroidea forms a valid clade.

Although many phylogenetic analyses found basal tetanurans that were outside both Megalosauroidea and Avetheropoda, the core dichotomy was named only in 2012. Carrano, Benson and Sampson (2012) named that clade Orionides, and defined it as the node comprising Megalosauroidea, Avetheropoda, their most recent common ancestor, and all its descendants. In 2015, Hendrickx, Hartman and Mateus clarified this definition, specifying it as the least inclusive clade including Allosaurus fragilis, Megalosaurus bucklandii, and Passer domesticus.

The clade name "Orionides" was first established by Matthew T. Carrano, Roger B. J. Benson and Scott D. Sampson in 2012. It is derived from Orion, the giant hunter of Greek mythology in references to the large size and carnivorism of basal orionidans. The name also refers to the alternative name for the constellation of Orion, Alektropodion, meaning "rooster foot".

The smaller clade, Avetheropoda was named by Gregory S. Paul in 1988, and was first defined as a clade by Currie and Padian in 1997, to include Allosaurus, modern birds, and other animals descended from their most recent ancestor. In 1999, Paul Sereno named another group, Neotetanurae, for the clade containing Allosauroidea and Coelurosauria, and excluding other tetanurans such as megalosauroids, but this definition was published slightly later. A monophyletic Avetheropoda is recovered in many papers; however, recent findings suggest a monophyletic Carnosauria model with allosauroids and megalosauroids as each other's closest relatives instead of Allosauroids and Coelurosaurs.

The cladogram presented below follows a phylogenetic analysis published by Zanno and Makovicky in 2013.

- Tetanurae
  - †Cryolophosaurus
  - †Sinosaurus
  - - †Chuandongocoelurus
    - †Monolophosaurus
    - Orionides
      - †Megalosauroidea
        - †Piatnitzkysauridae
        - †Megalosauria
          - †Spinosauridae
          - †Megalosauridae
      - Avetheropoda
        - Coelurosauria
        - †Allosauroidea
          - †Metriacanthosauridae
          - †Allosauria
            - †Allosauridae
            - †Carcharodontosauria
              - †Neovenatoridae
              - †Carcharodontosauridae

In 2019, Rauhut and Pol described Asfaltovenator vialidadi, a basal allosauroid displaying a mosaic of primitive and derived features seen within Tetanurae. Their phylogenetic analysis found traditional Megalosauroidea to represent a basal grade of carnosaurs, paraphyletic with respect to Allosauroidea.

- Tetanurae
  - Chuandongocoelurus
  - - Coelurosauria
    - Carnosauria
      - Monolophosaurus
      - - Spinosauridae
        - - Megalosauridae
          - Allosauroidea
            - Xuanhanosaurus
            - - Piatnitzkysauridae
              - - Asfaltovenator
                - - Metriacanthosauridae
                  - - Allosaurus
                    - Carcharodontosauria

== Paleobiology ==
=== Biogeography ===
The biogeographical history of non-avian Tetanurae spans over 110 million years and all continents. The presence of major lineages prior to the breakup of Pangaea implies wide dispersal of these clades, with later absences indicating regional extinctions or dispersal failure. The density of sampling is currently insufficient to provide a detailed analysis of biogeographical evolution for the Tetanurae.

=== Diversity ===
Tetanurae and Ceratosauria likely diverged during the late Triassic, more than 200 mya. By the Early Jurassic, Tetanurae fossils appear in the fossil record and reached global distribution by the Middle Jurassic. In the Late Jurassic, the fossil record demonstrates widespread presence of multiple clades within both megalosauroids and avetheropods. The Megalosauroidea contained high diversity with two Jurassic clades, Piatnitzkysauridae and Megalosauridae, as well as the Cretaceous Spinosauridae. Tetanuran evolution appears to exhibit waves of diversification, although this may be due to uneven sampling. During the Late Jurassic and Early Cretaceous, large spinosaurids and allosaurids flourished, but the latter possibly died out before the end of the Cretaceous due to the Cenomanian-Turonian boundary event, while spinosaurids are known from the Santonian. Soon afterwards the niche of terrestrial apex predator was filled by ceratosaurs and tyrannosaurids, which dominated terminal Cretaceous terrestrial ecosystems. Coelurosaurs persisted through the end of the Mesozoic Era. Modern birds are the only living representatives of the Tetanurae.
