= Kurek Formation =

Geologic formation in Uzbekistan

- Stratigraphic range: Late Oxfordian; ~160–157 Ma
- Type: Geological formation
- Unit of: Kugitang Svita

Lithology
- Primary: Limestone
- Other: Mudstone

Location
- Coordinates: 38.5°N 68.6°E
- Approximate paleocoordinates: 43.2°N 73.2°E
- Region: Lebap (Turkmenistan); Kashkadarya (Uzbekistan)
- Country: Turkmenistan, Uzbekistan

Type section
- Named for: Mount Kurek
- Kurek Formation (Uzbekistan)

The Kurek Formation (Russian: Kurek Svita) is a late Oxfordian (Late Jurassic) geologic formation of the Kugitang Svita in Turkmenistan and Uzbekistan. Fossil sauropod tracks have been reported from the formation.

== Etymology ==
The formation is named after Mount Kurek (2,280 metres (7,480 ft)), near Langar, Uzbekistan.

== Description ==
The mudstones and limestones of the formation comprise a 2 centimetres (0.79 in) thick, massive micrite (mudstone) with sporadic and poorly preserved thin-walled bivalves. Also tracks were preserved at that were probably made in shallow water, showing, in some parts, ripple marks.

== Fossil content ==
Among the following fossils have been found in the Kurek Formation:

Color key: Taxon / Reclassified taxon / Taxon falsely reported as present / Dubious taxon or junior synonym / Ichnotaxon / Ootaxon / Morphotaxon	Notes; Uncertain or tentative taxa are in small text; ~~crossed out~~ taxa are discredited.

=== Dinosaurs ===
Dinosaurs of the Kurek Formation
Genus	Species	Location	Stratigraphic position	Material	Notes	Images
Gissarosaurus	G. tetrafalangensis					

=== Ichnofossils ===
Ichnofossils of the Kurek Formation
Genus	Species	Location	Stratigraphic position	Material	Notes	Images
Megalosauripus	M. uzbekistanicus					
Mirsosauropus	M. tursunzadei					
Regarosauropus	R. manovi					
Shirkentosauropus	S. shirkentensis					
Therangospodus	T. pandemicus					

=== Molluscs ===
==== Bivalves ====
Bivalves of the Kurek Formation
Genus	Species	Location	Stratigraphic position	Material	Notes	Images
Bivalvia Indet.	Indeterminate					

== See also ==
- List of dinosaur-bearing rock formations
  - List of stratigraphic units with sauropodomorph tracks
    - Sauropod tracks
- Bissekty Formation
- Bostobe Formation
- Qiketai, Toutunhe, Shishugou and Qigu Formations, fossiliferous formations of the Junggar Basin, Xinjiang
- Haifanggou Formation, Hebei Basin, Hebei
- Oxfordian formations
  - Oxford Clay, England
  - Tendaguru Formation, fossiliferous formation of Tanzania
  - Cañadón Calcáreo Formation, fossiliferous formation of the Cañadón Asfalto Basin, Argentina
