= Kugitang Svita =

Geologic feature in Asia

- Stratigraphic range: Late Oxfordian-early Kimmeridgian; ~160–155 Ma
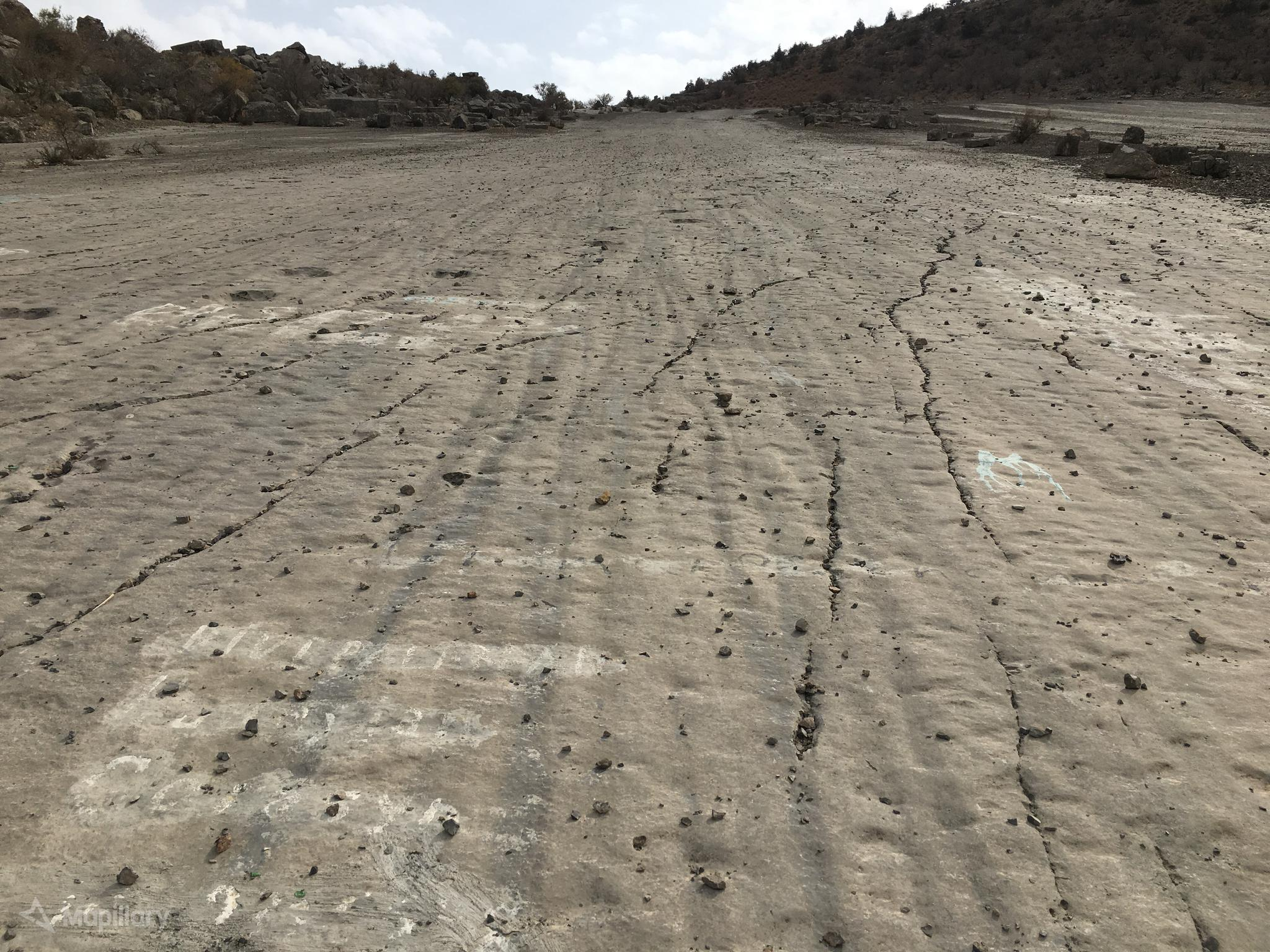
- Dinosaur Plateau
- Type: Formation or group
- Sub-units: Dinosaur Plateau (Turkmenistan); Kurek Formation (Turkmenistan)

Lithology
- Primary: Limestone
- Other: Mudstone

Location
- Coordinates: 38.5°N 68.6°E
- Approximate paleocoordinates: 43.2°N 73.2°E
- Region: Lebap (Turkmenistan); Kugitang, Shirkent (Tajikistan); Kashkadarya (Uzbekistan)
- Country: Turkmenistan (Group); Tajikistan; Uzbekistan (Formation)

Type section
- Named for: Kugitang, Kugitang Mountains
- Kugitang Svita (Uzbekistan)

The Kugitang Formation or Group (Russian: Kugitang Svita) is an Oxfordian geologic formation in Tajikistan and Uzbekistan and a geologic group in Turkmenistan. Dinosaur remains diagnostic to the genus level are among the fossils that have been recovered from the formation.

== Fossil content ==
Among the following fossils have been found in the Kugitang Svita:

Color key: Taxon / Reclassified taxon / Taxon falsely reported as present / Dubious taxon or junior synonym / Ichnotaxon / Ootaxon / Morphotaxon	Notes; Uncertain or tentative taxa are in small text; ~~crossed out~~ taxa are discredited.

=== Dinosaurs ===
Dinosaurs of the Kugitang Svita
Genus	Species	Location	Stratigraphic position	Material	Notes	Images
Chodjapilesaurus	C. krimholzi					
Gissarosaurus	G. tetrafalangensis					

=== Ichnofossils ===
Ichnofossils of the Kugitang Svita
Genus	Species	Location	Stratigraphic position	Material	Notes	Images
Megalosauripus	M. uzbekistanicus					
Mirsosauropus	M. tursunzadei					
Regarosauropus	R. manovi					
Shirkentosauropus	S. shirkentensis					
Therangospodus	T. pandemicus					

=== Insects ===
Insects of the Kugitang Svita
Genus	Species	Location	Stratigraphic position	Material	Notes	Images
Shurabia	S. hissarica					

=== Invertebrates ===
Invertebrates of the Kugitang Svita
Genus	Species	Location	Stratigraphic position	Material	Notes	Images
Apocladophyllia	A. koniakensis					
Bivalvia Indet.	Indeterminate					
Calamophylliopsis	C. kyrvakarensis					
Dorsoplicathyris	D. farcinata					
Kobyastraea	K. lomontiana					
Tubegatanella	T. repmanae					

== See also ==
- List of dinosaur-bearing rock formations
  - List of stratigraphic units with few dinosaur genera
- Bissekty Formation
- Bostobe Formation
- Qiketai, Toutunhe, Shishugou and Qigu Formations, fossiliferous formations of the Junggar Basin, Xinjiang
- Haifanggou Formation, Hebei Basin, Hebei
- Oxfordian formations
  - Oxford Clay, England
  - Tendaguru Formation, fossiliferous formation of Tanzania
  - Cañadón Calcáreo Formation, fossiliferous formation of the Cañadón Asfalto Basin, Argentina
