= Dinosaur Stomping Grounds =

Fossil locality in Utah, US

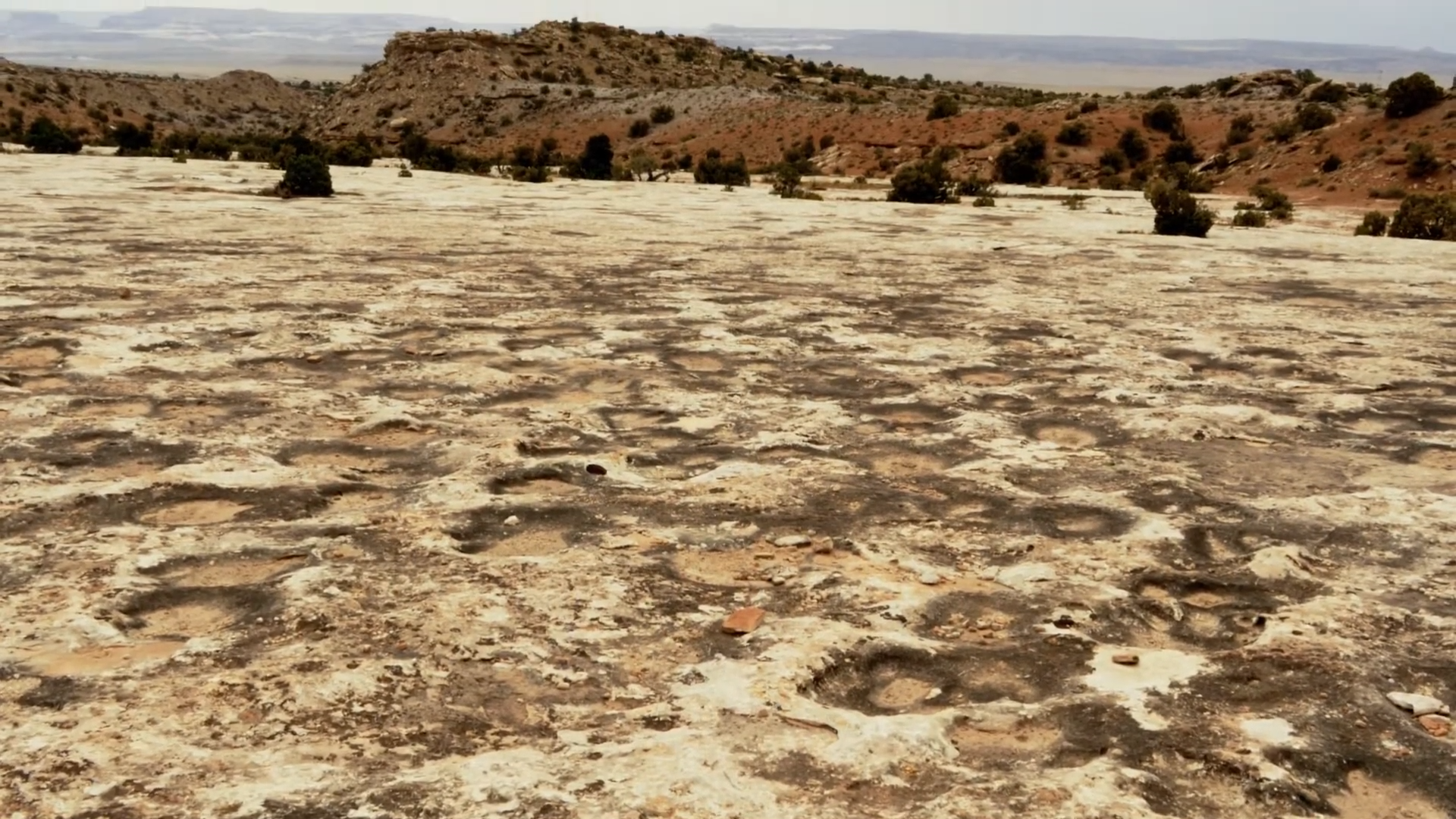
- View of parts of the tracksite
- Trailhead of Dinosaur Stomping Grounds (interactive map)
- Location: Grand County, Utah, US
- Nearest city: Moab
- Coordinates: 38°49′22.4″N 109°45′08.8″W
- Governing body: Bureau of Land Management
- Website: www.blm.gov/visit/dinosaur-stomping-grounds-trailhead

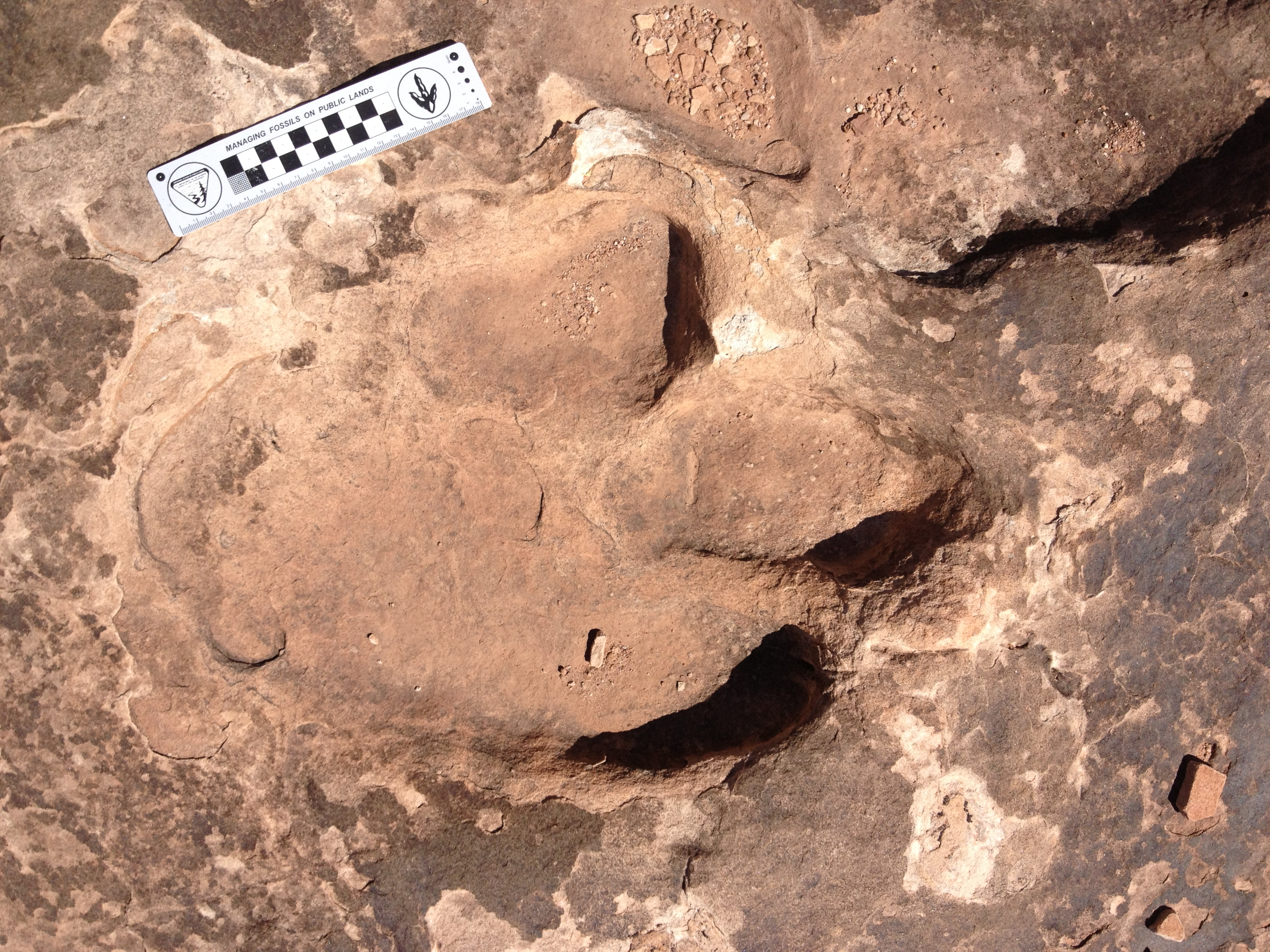
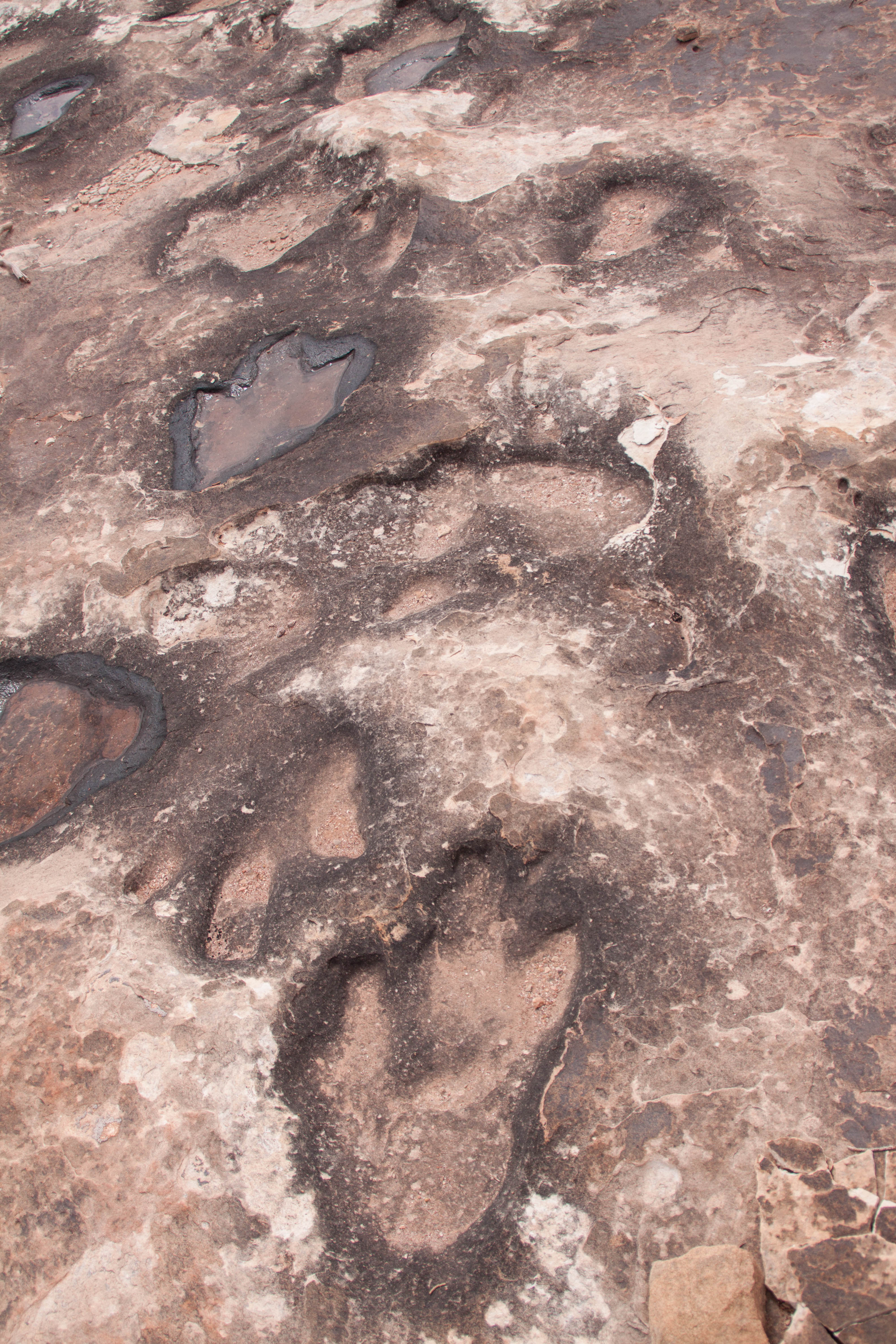
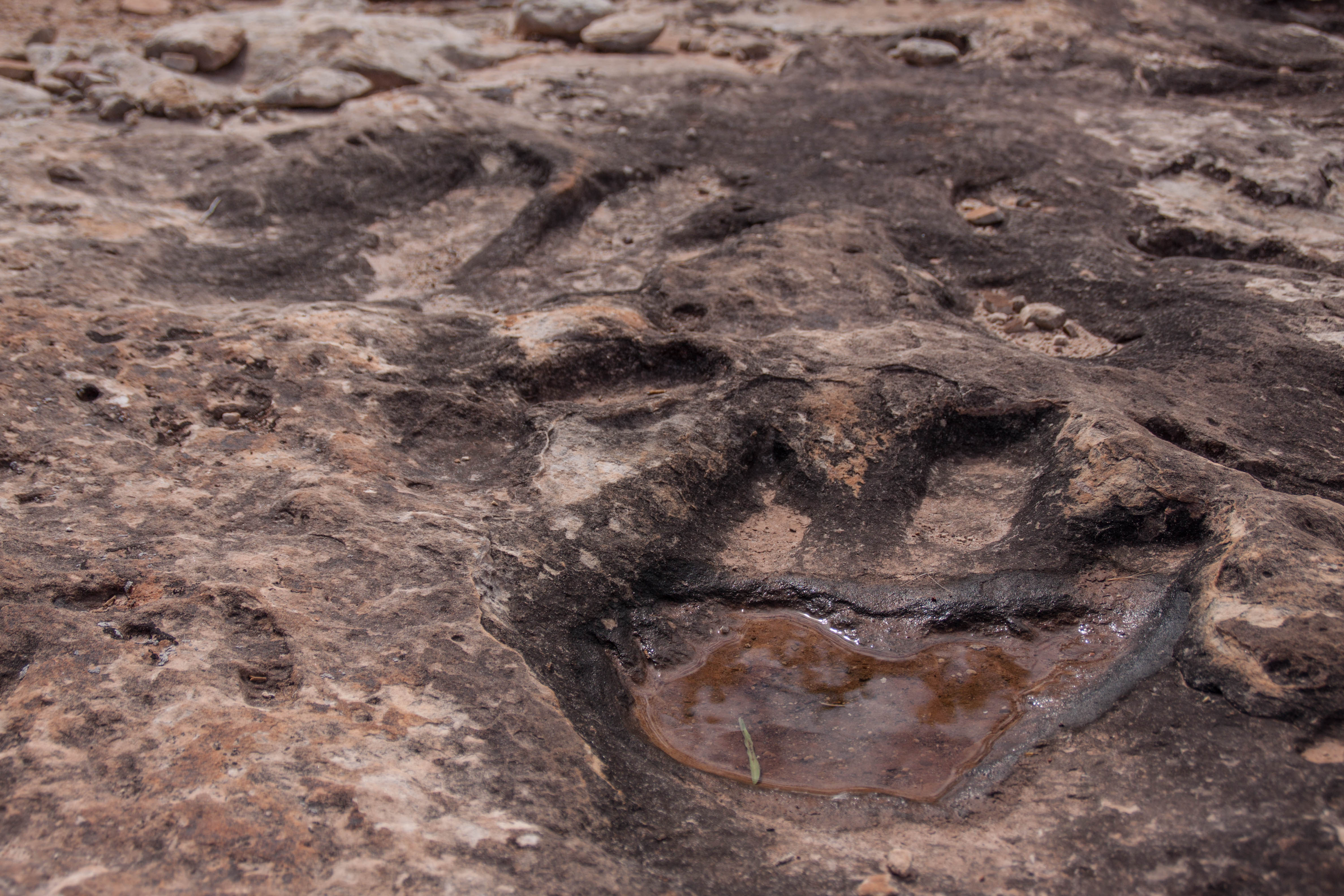
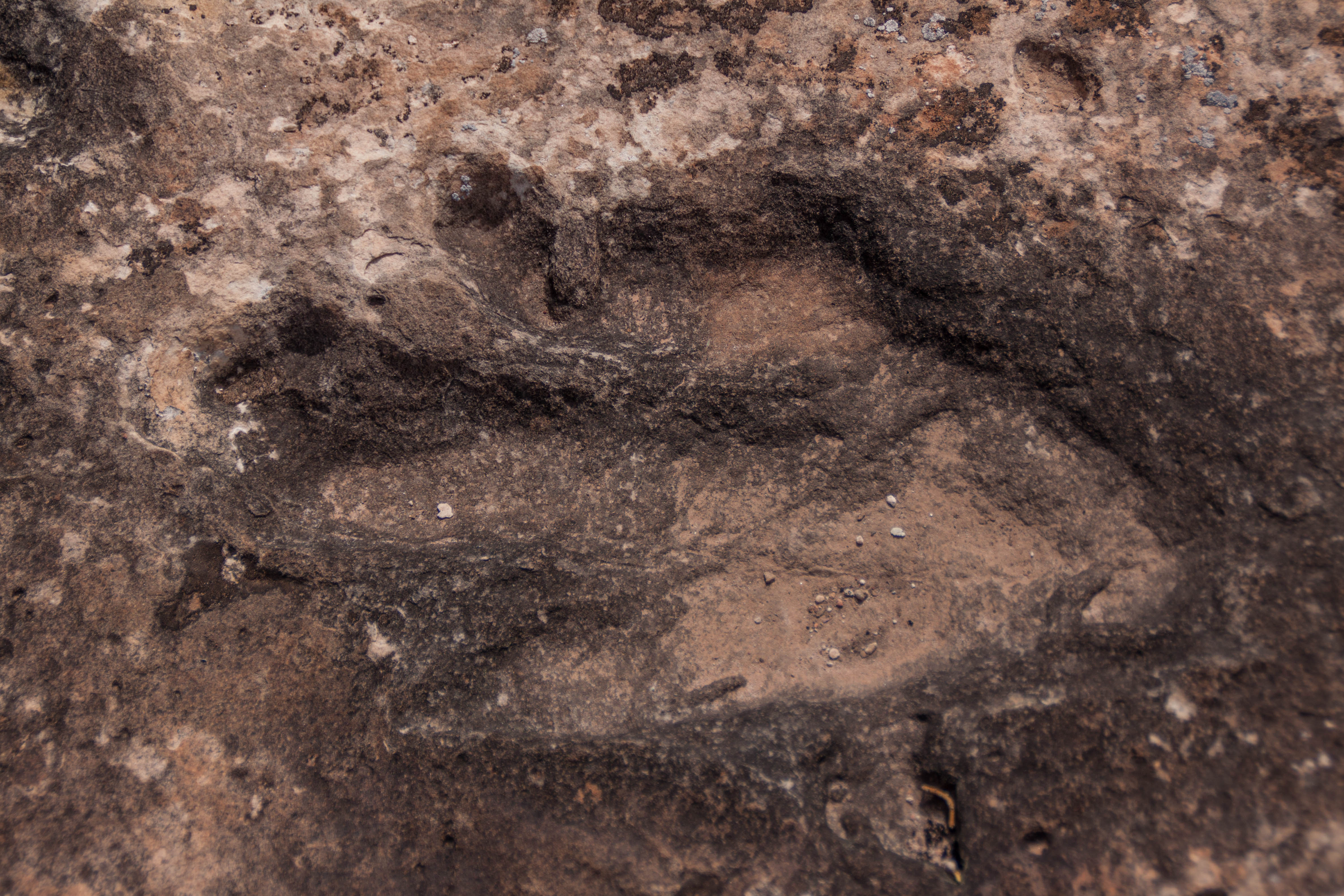
Tracks at Stomping Grounds

Dinosaur Stomping Grounds, also known as the MM Q site, is a fossil locality in Grand County, eastern Utah, US. The site preserves about 2300 fossil tracks of dinosaurs from the Late Jurassic (Oxfordian age, 72.2 to 161.5 million years ago). The tracks occur in such a high density that clear trackways (successive tracks left by the same animal) cannot be seen. The tracks are three-toed and belonged to carnivorous dinosaurs (theropods), and examples have been assigned to the ichnogenus Megalosauripus.

The tracksite has been scientifically documented in 1988 and is accessible to the public as an interpretive site managed by the Bureau of Land Management. The site is preserved in sandstones between the Curtis Formation and the Summerville Formation, and is the largest site of the Moab Megatracksite, a widespread surface in south-eastern Utah that contains dozens of tracksites.

== Discovery and locality ==
The site is located in Grand County, eastern Utah, US. In 1988, paleontologists from the University of Colorado mapped about 2300 tracks over an area of 2 acres (0.81 ha). Since then, the site has been made accessible to the public as an interpretive site managed by the Bureau of Land Management. It is one of three interpretive sites of the Moab Megatracksite, together with the Willow Springs and Bull Canyon Dinosaur Tracks. The site can be accessed via a marked round-trip trail that is about 3 miles (4.8 km) in length. It is also known as "MM Q" (Moab Megatracksite site Q).

Studies have ranked Dinosaur Stomping Grounds amongst the 10 most significant dinosaur tracksites in the US, and amongst the 30 most significant ones worldwide. These rankings assess sites in terms of Outstanding Universal Value, which is measured using multiple criteria such as size and number of tracks.

Geologically, the tracksite dates to the Oxfordian age (161.5 million years ago) of the Late Jurassic and is located in-between the Curtis Formation (Moab Tongue) and the overlaying Summerville Formation. It is part of the Moab Megatracksite, a surface, or thin sequence of sediments, that occurs in large parts of southeastern Utah and contains numerous tracksites (43 known sites as of 2022). The Moab Megatracksite contains a total of about 4300 known tracks, about half of which are preserved at Dinosaur Stomping Grounds.

== Dinosaur tracks ==
The tracks occur in such a high density that clear trackways (successive tracks left my the same animal) are not identifiable. The site preserves three-toed tracks of carnivorous (theropod) dinosaurs, with identifiable examples attributed to the ichnogenus Megalosauripus. Other sites of the Moab Megatracksite also exclusively preserve theropod tracks. In 2023, Martin Lockley and Christian Meyer suggested that the absence of plant-eating dinosaurs could be due to an arid climate, which is indicated by the occurrence of dune and sabkha deposits. The theropods might have patrolled the shoreline in this area in search for carcasses of marine reptiles and fish.

In 2022, Lockley reported a second site very close to the main Stomping Grounds site. This site is preserved in dune deposits and stratigraphically within one meter of the Stomping Grounds surface. It preserves 20 tracks, including three trackways, of small theropods.
