= Phu Kradung Formation =

Geologic formation in Thailand

- Stratigraphic range: Kimmeridgian-Berriasian; ~155–140 Ma
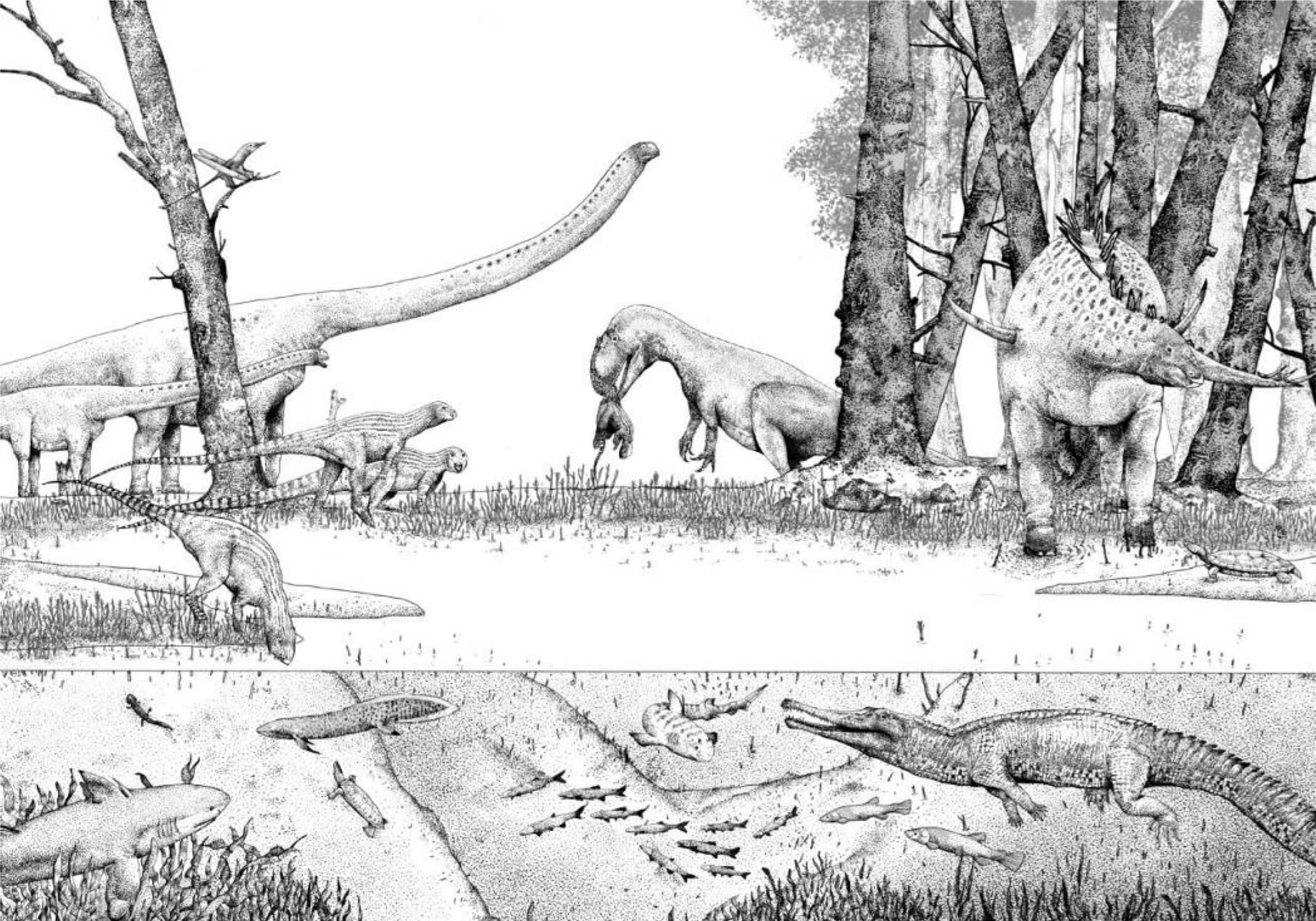
- Paleoenvironment of the Phu Kradung Formation
- Type: Geological formation
- Unit of: Khorat Group
- Underlies: Phra Wihan Formation
- Overlies: Nam Phong Formation

Lithology
- Primary: Siltstone, mudstone
- Other: Sandstone

Location
- Coordinates: 17.2°N 102.4°E
- Approximate paleocoordinates: 14.7°N 108.5°E
- Region: Isan
- Country: Thailand
- Extent: Khorat Plateau

Type section
- Named by: Ward & Bunnag
- Year defined: 1964
- Phu Kradung Formation (Thailand)

The Early Cretaceous Phu Kradung Formation is the lowest member of the Mesozoic Khorat Group which outcrops on the Khorat Plateau in Isan, Thailand. This geological formation consists of micaceous, brown to reddish-brown siltstone beds with minor brown and grey shale and sandstone beds. Occasional lime-noduled conglomerate occurs.

The Phu Kradung Formation sediments were deposited in a lake-dominated floodplain cut by meandering and occasionally braided river channels.

The Phu Kradung Formation is considered, on the basis of recent vertebrae fossil discoveries, to be Late Jurassic in age. However, new palynology and biostratigraphic data suggested an age of Early Cretaceous for the upper section.

More recent datations trought detrital zircon U–Pb ages of samples from the conglomerates have stablished a lowermost age of late Early Jurassic (Toarcian), with a maximum depositional age of 180 Ma, which is older than the previously estimated Late Jurassic–Berriasian age based on fossil evidence. This discrepancy suggests the absence of syn-depositional zircons. The zircon data also help clarify the timing of the Indosinian III Event, placing the Indosinian III Unconformity between 201 and 182 Ma, marking a hiatus of about 20 million years. The Phu Kradung Formation deposition likely occurred after the Nam Phong Formation and may correlate with the Upper part of the last in the Khorat Basin subsurface.

In 2026, detrital zircon uranium-lead dating produced precise ages for the Phu Kradung Formation, with the conclusion being the formation spans the Kimmeridgian to Berriasian stages of the Late Jurassic to the earliest Cretaceous.

Dinosaur remains have been recovered from this formation, although few have been referred to a specific genus.

== Fossil content ==
Color key: Taxon / Reclassified taxon / Taxon falsely reported as present / Dubious taxon or junior synonym / Ichnotaxon / Ootaxon / Morphotaxon

Notes
Uncertain or tentative taxa are in small text
~~crossed out~~ taxa are discredited.

=== Amphibians ===
Amphibians reported from the Phu Kradung Formation
Genus	Species	Presence	Material	Notes	Images
Brachyopidae indet.		Phu Noi locality, Kham Muang district, Kalasin province.	Posterior part of the skull (KS34-1481) and two intercentra (KS34-1474 and KS34-1489).		
Brachyopoidea indet.			Intercentra (TF 3328, TF 3329, and TF 3144).	Also found in the Klong Min Formation.	
Brachyopoidea indet.		Khao Wong locality, Khao Wong district, Kalasin province.	Intercentrum (KS37-8).		

=== Archosaurs ===
==== Dinosaurs ====
Dinosaurs reported from the Phu Kradung Formation
Genus	Species	Presence	Material	Notes	Images
Mamenchisauridae indet.	Indeterminate	Phu Dan Ma, Kalasin province	Isolated posterior cervical vertebra		
Mamenchisauridae indet.	Indeterminate	Phu Noi, Ban Khok Sanam, Dan Luang and Chong Chat localities	Dental remains		
Metriacanthosauridae indet.	Indeterminate		"a nearly complete left tibia"		
Metriacanthosauridae indet.	Indeterminate		Partial skull and appendicular elements of more than one individual		
Metriacanthosauridae indet.	Indeterminate	Mukdahan	A single tooth		
Minimocursor	M. phunoiensis	Phu Noi, Kalasin province	Partial articulated skeleton, isolated lower jaw, and left leg	A basal neornithischian	
Stegosauridae indet.	Indeterminate		Single dorsal vertebra	Informally known as "Siamodracon altispinus"	
Proceratosauridae indet.	Indeterminate	Phu Noi, Kalasin province	Three isolated teeth	A basal proceraosaurid tyrannosauroid; closely related to Guanlong wucaii and Proceratosaurus bradleyi.	
Uragasaurus	U. kalasinensis	Phu Noi, Kalasin province	Isolated anterior dorsal vertebra	A mamenchisaurid sauropod; other cranial and postcranial elements are present in the same locality but not referred to this taxon.	

==== Pseudosuchians ====
Pseudosuchians reported from the Phu Kradung Formation
Genus	Species	Presence	Material	Notes	Images
Chalawan	C. thailandicus	a road-cut near the town of Nong Bua Lamphu	a nearly complete mandible	A pholidosaurid tethysuchian	
Indosinosuchus	I. kalasinensis			A teleosaurid thalattosuchian	
Indosinosuchus	I. potamosiamensis		Skulls and postcrania.	A teleosaurid thalattosuchian	
Sunosuchus	S. thailandicus		A mandible.	Reassigned to Chalawan.	
Cf. Theriosuchus	Cf. T. sp.	Chong Chat, Nong Bua Lamphu province.	Part of a left dentary (CCC-1) and a lanceolate tooth (PRCMR 283).	A atoposaurid neosuchian	

==== Pterosaurs ====
Pterosaurs reported from the Phu Kradung Formation
Genus	Species	Presence	Material	Notes	Images
Rhamphorhynchidae indet.	Indeterminate		Humerus.	Originally identified as an azhdarchid.	

==== Turtles ====
Turtles reported from the Phu Kradung Formation
Genus	Species	Presence	Material	Notes	Images
Basilochelys	B. macrobios	Kham Phok, Mukdahan Province.		A trionychoid trionychian	
Eucryptodira indet.					
Kalasinemys	K. prasarttongosothi	Phu Noi locality, Kalasin Province.	Skull and shell material.	A xinjiangchelyid turtle	
Phunoichelys	P. thirakhupti	Phu Noi locality, Kalasin Province.	Shell remains.	A xinjiangchelyid turtle	
Yakemys	Y. multiporcata	Khorat Plateau.	Shell elements.	A macrobaenid turtle	

=== Fish ===
==== Bony fish ====
Bony fish reported from the Phu Kradung Formation
Genus	Species	Presence	Material	Notes	Images
Ferganoceratodus	F. annekempae	Phu Noi.		A ceratodontiform lungfish	
Ferganoceratodus	F. martini			A ceratodontiform lungfish	
Isanichthys	I. lertboosi	Phu Noi locality, Kalasin province.	4 specimens.	A Lepidotid fish	
Isanichthys	I. palustris		A single, nearly complete specimen.	A lepidoti fish	
Khoratichthys	K. gibbus		"Impression of a single articulated fish".	A lepisosteiform fish	
Thaiichthys	T. buddhabutrensis	Phu Nam Jun, Kalasin Province.		A lepisosteoidean lepisosteiform	

==== Cartilaginous fish ====
Multiple fin spines have been found in the Phu Kradung Formation which cannot be precisely identified.

Cartilaginous fish reported from the Phu Kradung Formation
Genus	Species	Presence	Material	Notes	Images
Acrodus	A. kalasinensis	Kalasin province.	Teeth.	A acrodontid hybodont	
Heteroptychodus	H. cf. H. kokutensis		One almost complete tooth and 20 fragmentary crowns.		
?Hybodontidae			Dermal denticles of 2 morphotypes.	A hybodontid hybodont.	
Hybodus	aff. H. sp.		"One almost complete anterior crown (SM2012-1-004) and a complete posterior tooth (SM2012-1-005)".		
Hybodus	H. sp.		Teeth.	"Similar to the teeth of H. huangnidanensis (which is probably a junior synonym of H. antingensis)".	
Jiaodontus	J. sp.		10 teeth.	A lonchidiid hybodontiform	
Lonchidion	L. sp. A		SM2012-1-015-6 and 12 crowns.	A lonchidiid hybodontiform	
Lonchidion	L. sp. B		Teeth and crowns.	A lonchidiid hybodontiform	

=== Plants ===
Plants reported from the Phu Kradung Formation
Genus	Species	Presence	Material	Notes	Images
Xenoxylon	X. phyllocladoides		Fossil wood.		

== See also ==
- Lists of dinosaur-bearing stratigraphic units
  - List of stratigraphic units with indeterminate dinosaur fossils
