= Bull Canyon Dinosaur Tracks Overlook =

Fossil locality in Utah, US

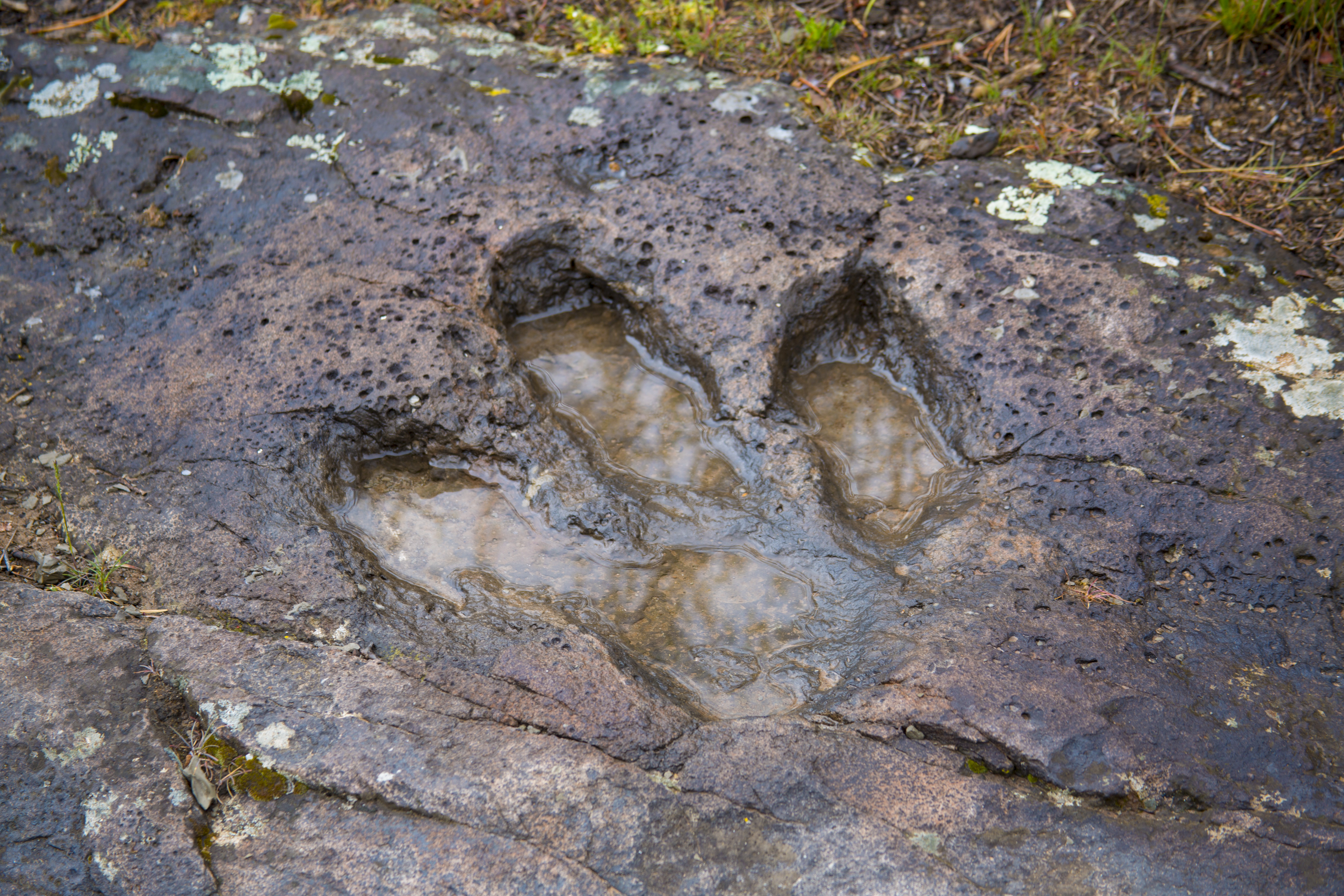
- Fossil track assigned to Megalosauripus
- Interactive map of Bull Canyon Dinosaur Tracks Overlook
- Location: Grand County, Utah, US
- Nearest city: Moab
- Coordinates: 38°36′57″N 109°13′24″W
- Governing body: US Forest Service
- Website: www.fs.usda.gov/r04/manti-lasal/recreation/bull-canyon-overlook-interpretive-site

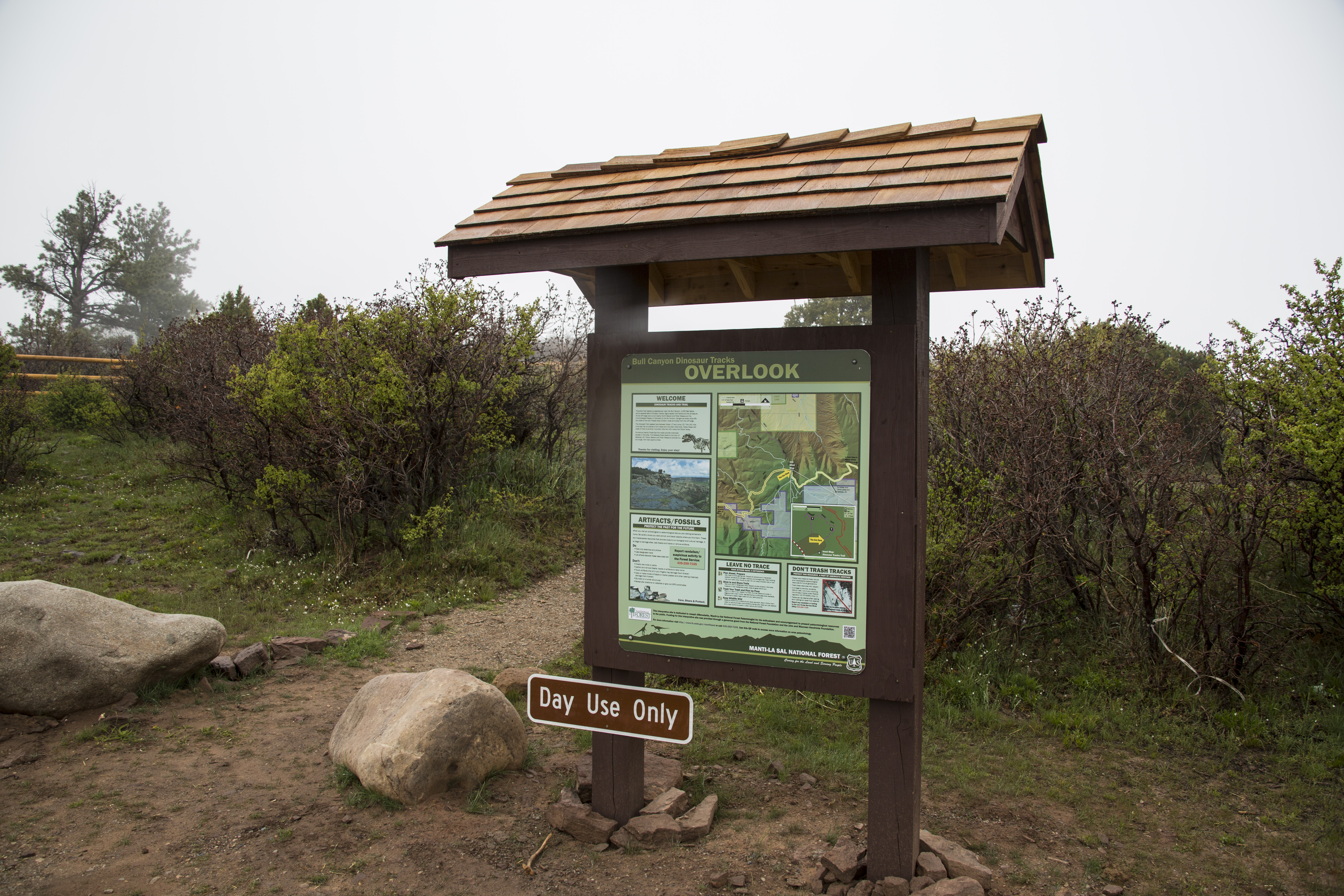
Interpretive sign at the tracksite

Bull Canyon Dinosaur Tracks Overlook, also known as the Fisher Mesa tracksite, preserves fossil tracks of dinosaurs from the Late Jurassic (Oxfordian age, 162 to 155 million years ago). The site is located east of Moab, Utah, US, in the La Sal Mountains at an altitude of 2,743 m (8,999 ft). An interpretive site managed by the United States Forest Service, it is open to visitors and provides views of both Bull Canyon and Fisher Mesa. The site preserves tracks of large theropod dinosaurs assigned to the ichnogenus Megalosauripus; tracks measure up to 46 cm (18 in) in length. A total of 46 tracks in 14 trackways has been recorded. The tracksite is part of the Moab Megatracksite, a widespread surface in south-eastern Utah that contains dozens of tracksites.

== Discovery and locality ==
The site is located in the La Sal Mountains west of the city of Moab, Utah, on public land that is part of the Manti-La Sal National Forest. Located at an altitude of 2,743 m (8,999 ft), it provides scenic views of both Bull Canyon and Fisher Mesa. According to a 1991 newspaper article, the tracks were discovered by the locals Marge and Desi Desormeaux. The tracks were mapped and studied by the paleontologist Martin Lockley, with results published in 2016 and 2022. One representative track has been collected (specimen number UCM 187.6) and is housed in the University of Colorado Museum.

The site is accessible to the public as an interpretive site managed by the United States Forest Service. Tracks do mostly occur in two areas, the East and West sites, which are separated by ca. 50 m (160 ft) and accessible through paths. The East Site is located at a cliff edge that has been described as dangerous to approach; parts of the surface have collapsed, and some tracks can be seen on fallen blocks. Ponderosa pine and scrub oak grow at the site.

Geologically, the tracksite dates to the Oxfordian age (162 to 155 million years ago) of the Late Jurassic and is located in-between the Curtis Formation (Moab Member) and the overlaying Summerville Formation. It is part of the Moab Megatracksite, a surface, or thin sequence of sediments, that occurs in large parts of southeastern Utah and contains numerous tracksites (43 known sites as of 2022). The Bull Canyon is the only tracksite within the Moab Megatracksite known from the La Sal Mountains. It is one of three tracksites within the megatracksites that have been developed as interpretive sites, together with the Willow Springs and Dinosaur Stomping Grounds sites.

== Tracks ==
All tracks are of the same type and attributed to large theropod dinosaurs. They are about 38–46 cm (15–18 in) in length and 30–37 cm (12–15 in) in width, and assigned to the ichnogenus Megalosauripus, which is widespread in the Moab Megatracksite. The tracks are three-toed, and one track shows an impression of the metatarsus. One representative track has an angle of 42° between the outer toe impressions.

A total of 46 tracks have been mapped, the majority of which are part of 14 trackways (7 in the East Site and 7 in the West Site). The trackmakers headed to various directions, though there was a slight preference towards the South East (in the East Site) and North West (in the West Site). The stride length (the distance covered by the same foot from lift-up to touch-down) has been measured at 212 cm (83 in) in one trackway. The speed of locomotion has been estimated at between 4 and 5.6 km/h (2.5 and 3.5 mph).
