= Dinosaur Plateau =

Large limestone slab in Turkmenistan

- Stratigraphic range: Late Oxfordian-early Kimmeridgian; ~160–155 Ma
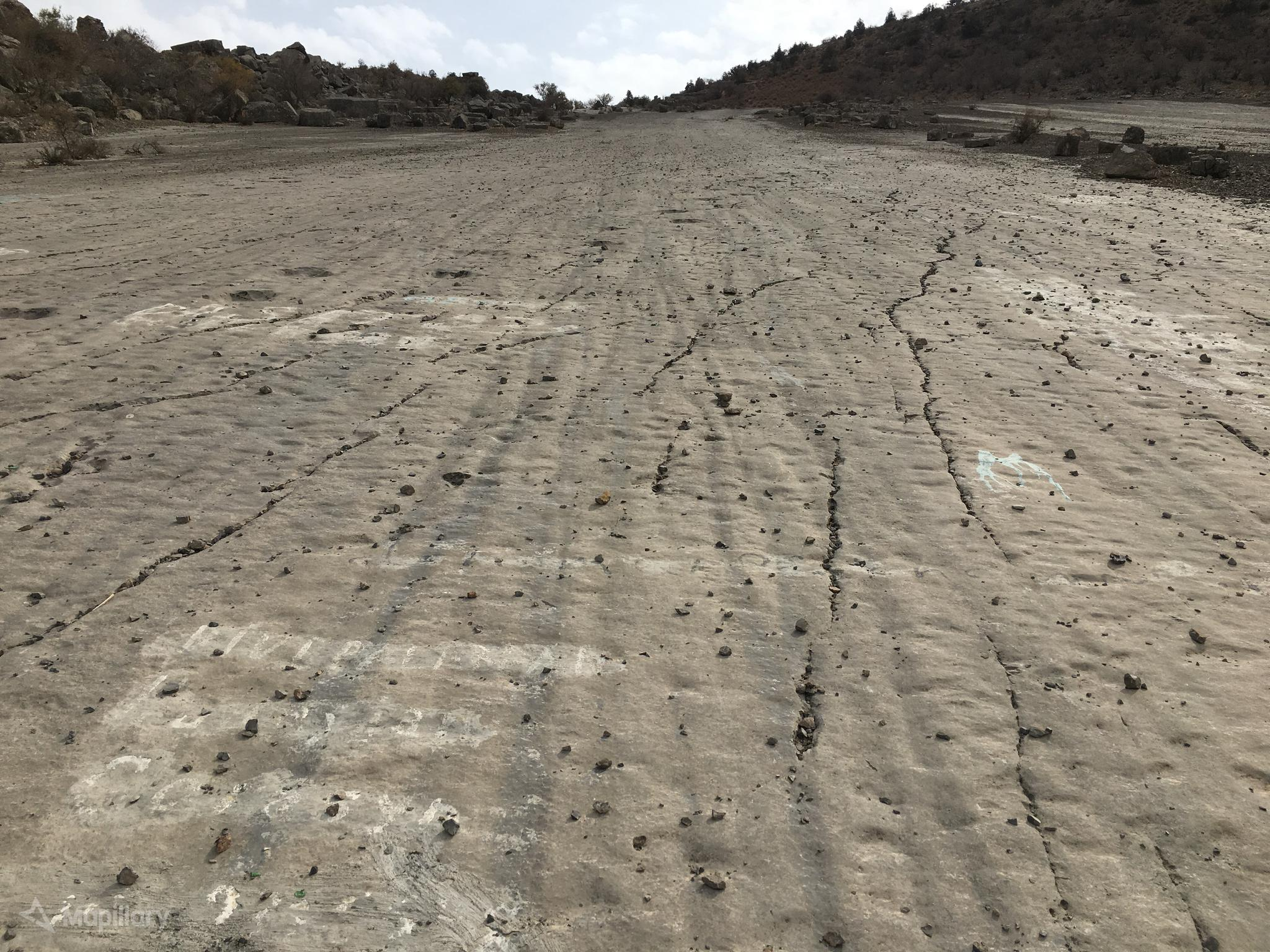
- The main trackways at Dinosaur Plateau in 2016
- Unit of: Kugitang Svita

Lithology
- Primary: Limestone
- Other: Mudstone

Location
- Coordinates: 37.9336°N 66.6294°E
- Region: Lebap Region
- Country: Turkmenistan
- Extent: Köýtendag Nature Reserve
- Dinosaur Plateau (Turkmenistan)

Dinosaur Plateau, also known as the Khodzapil-Ata Tracksite, (Turkmen: Dinozawrlar platosy) is a large limestone slab from the Kugitang Svita that is located on the slope of the Köýtendag mountains in the Lebap Region of Turkmenistan. The area is notable for preserving the largest concentration of dinosaur footprints in a single area.

== History ==
=== Geological history ===
During the late Oxfordian and early Kimmeridgian, the bottom of a shallow lagoon existed in what is today Turkmenistan, and dinosaurs would have walked within this lagoon. Soon after this, the water receded and the former bottom dried out, turning into a solid layer of limestone.

After millions of years, as a result of geological processes, tectonic plates collided and this area formed a pile of rocks which later became a slab of rocks. The slab, which previously lay horizontally, tilted and rose to its current height. After another few million years, the softer rocks were eroded by water and winds, and the area with the dinosaur tracks was exposed.

Dinosaur Plateau is today part of the Kugitang Svita.

=== Modern history ===
A local Turkmen legend states that the footprints of large animals from the Dinosaur Plateau belonged to the elephants from Alexander the Great's army which were left during his Asian campaign. Therefore, the nearby village was named Hojapil, which translates from the Turkmen as "sacred elephants".

The name of the village and the ancient legend about unusual footprints indicate that local residents were aware of them for many centuries. It was they who indicated the location of the traces to local Turkmen historians and geologists, who published the first scientific reports about Dinosaur Plateau during the 1950s.

Dinosaur Plateau was then examined by specialists from the Institute of Geology of the USSR Academy of Sciences in 1980, and it was also repeatedly visited by groups of students from various universities.

In more recent years, Dinosaur Plateau has been studied by Turkmen palaeontologist Anatoly Bushmakin, who specialises in the local area. It was placed on the UNESCO World Heritage Tentative List in 2009 and no later than 2014, the government of Turkmenistan began working to include the Dinosaur Plateau on the UNESCO World Heritage List.

== Description ==
The Dinosaur Plateau is approximately 400 metres (1,300 ft) long and 300 metres (980 ft) and within this area, around 2,500 well-preserved dinosaur tracks and 31 trackways have been discovered.

=== Known fossils ===
The footprints of theropods and ornithopods have been discovered at Dinosaur Plateau, with four ichnogenera having been identified: Chodjapilesaurus, Gissarosaurus, Therangospodus, and Turkmenosaurus.

The theropods, identified as Chodjapilesaurus, Therangospodus and Turkmenosaurus, moved along 26 trackways, the longest of which were 195 metres (640 ft), 226 metres (741 ft), 266 metres (873 ft), and 311 metres (1,020 ft) long, which is a "world record." These theropod footprints are also the largest known from the Jurassic (measurements indicate the trackmaker measured up to 6 metres (20 ft) long) and they also have the largest known stride lengths of any known theropod trackways.

The ornithopods, identified as Gissarosaurus, travelled along the remaining five known trackways; less is known about the ornithopod footprints than the theropod footprints at Dinosaur Plateau.

Besides this, the plateau has footprints of a humanlike creature that is equal to 10.5 shoe size and the poorly-preserved impressions of bivalve fossils have also been identified from Dinosaur Plateau.

=== Location ===
The Dinosaur Plateau is located 3 kilometres (1.9 mi) southwest of the mountain village of Hojapil at a 1.5 kilometres (0.93 mi) altitude on the territory of the Köýtendag Nature Reserve, within the Hojapil Sanctuary.

== Gallery ==
A theropod trackway at Dinosaur Plateau

A theropod trackway at Dinosaur Plateau

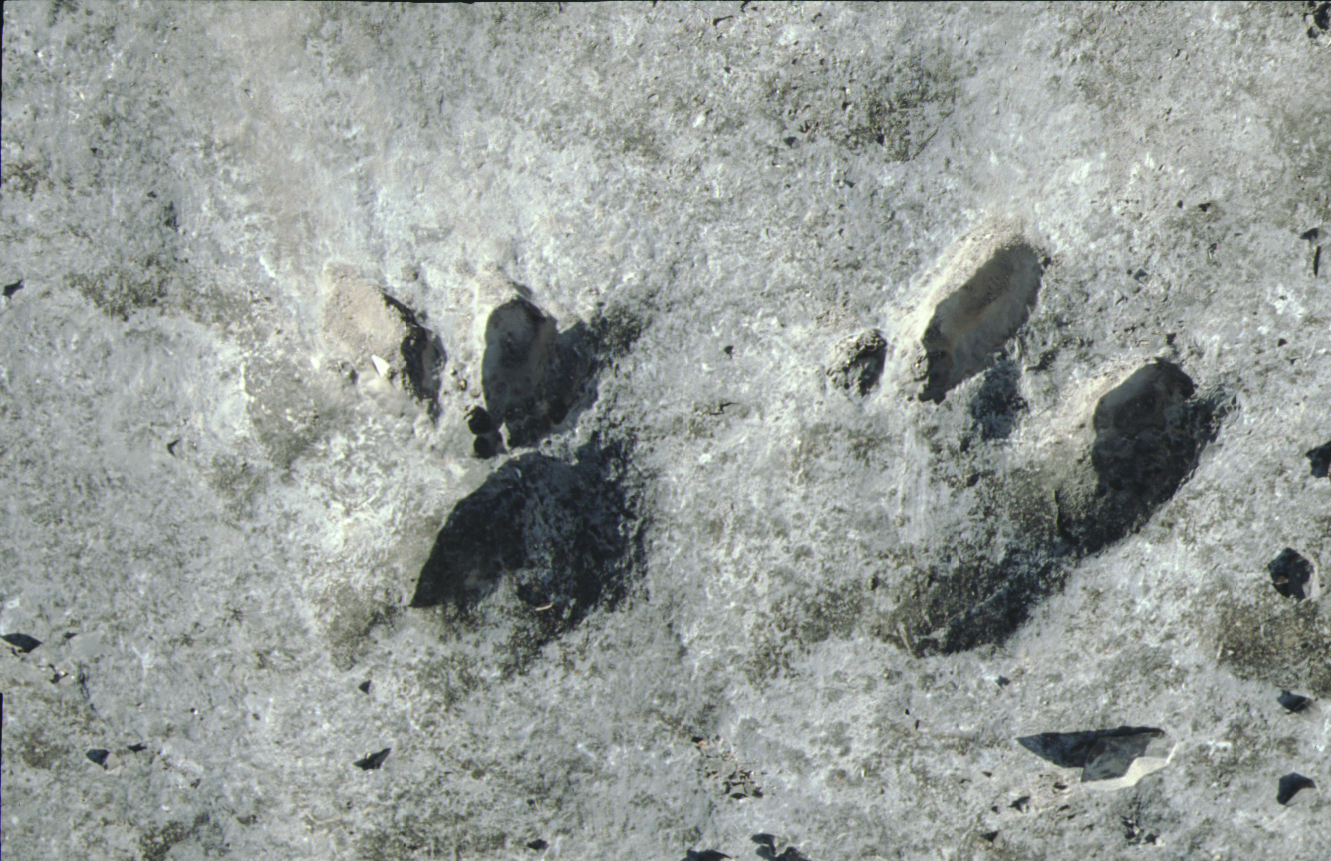
A pair of ornithopod footprints at Dinosaur Plateau
