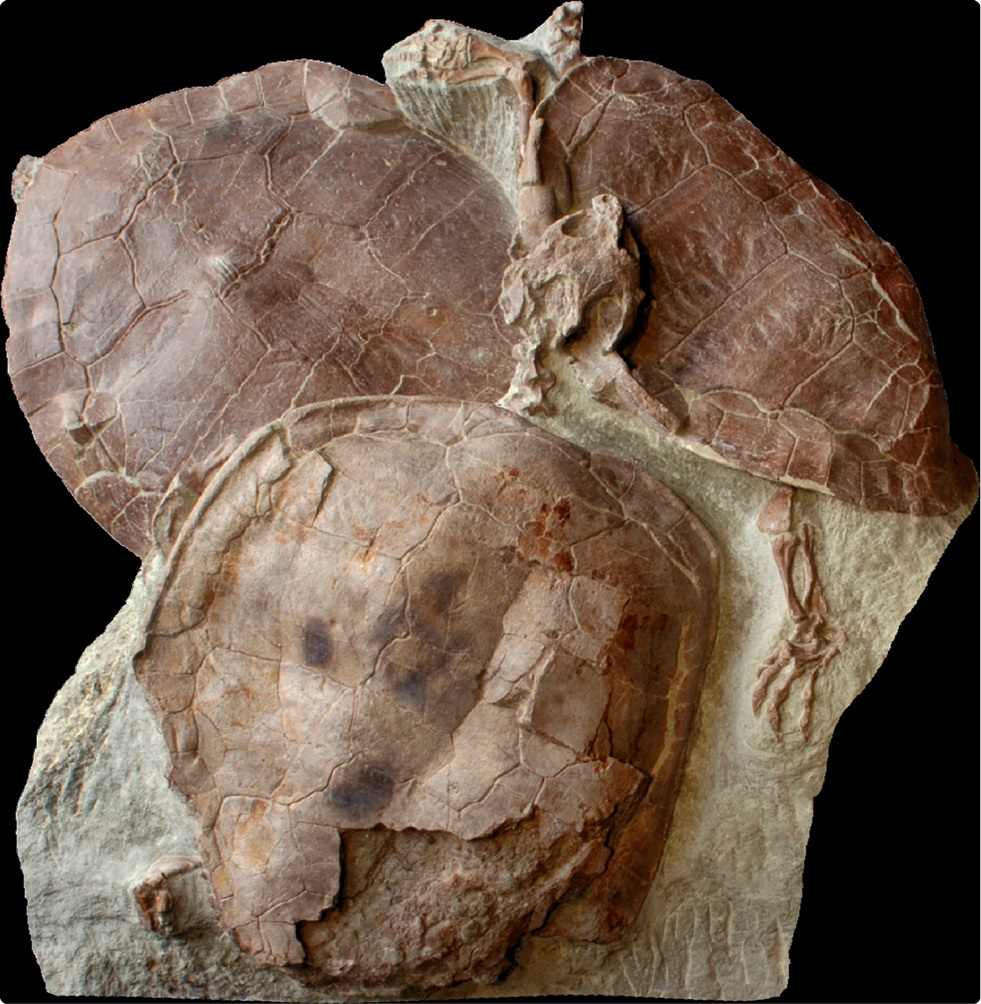
- Xinjiangchelys wusu

Scientific classification
- Kingdom: Animalia
- Phylum: Chordata
- Class: Reptilia
- Clade: Pantestudines
- Clade: Testudinata
- Clade: Perichelydia
- Family: †Xinjiangchelyidae; Nessov, 1990

Genera
- See text

= Xinjiangchelyidae =

Xinjiangchelyidae Temporal range: Toarcian–Albian

Extinct family of turtles

Xinjiangchelyidae is an extinct family of turtles known from the Lower Jurassic to the Middle Cretaceous of Asia and western Europe. They have generally been interpreted as either being basal cryptodires or placed outside of crown Testudines.

== Genera ==
- Annemys Itat Formation, Russia, Middle Jurassic (Bathonian) Qigu Formation, Shishugou Formation, China, Late Jurassic (Oxfordian) Ulan Malgait Formation, Mongolia, Late Jurassic (Tithonian)
- Brodiechelys Vectis Formation, United Kingdom, Early Cretaceous (Barremian) Arcillas de Morella Formation, Spain, Early Cretaceous (Aptian)
- Camerochelys Enciso Group, Spain, Early Cretaceous (Barremian-Aptian)
- Jastmelchyi
- Kalasinemys Phu Kradung Formation, Thailand, Tithonian
- Larachelus Pinilla de los Moros Formation, Spain, Early Cretaceous (Hauterivian-Barrmeian)
- Phunoichelys Phu Kradung Formation, Thailand, Tithonian
- Shartegemys Ulan Malgait Formation, Mongolia, Late Jurassic (Tithonian)
- Tienfuchelys Shaximiao Formation, China, Middle-Upper Jurassic
- Undjulemys Onjüül locality, Mongolia, Late Jurassic
- Xinjiangchelys Middle Jurassic-Early Cretaceous, Asia
- Protoxinjiangchelys Xintiangou Formation, China, Lower-Middle Jurassic

=== Phylogeny ===
Cladogram of Perichelydia after Miller et al. 2023, showing the two proposed positions of Xinjiangchelyidae.

- Perichelydia
  - †Mongolochelys
  - - †Meiolaniformes (Meiolania)
    - - †Paracryptodira
      - - †Sinemydidae+†Xinjiangchelyidae?
        - - - †Protostegidae?
            - †Thalassochelydia
          - - Pleurodira (side-necked turtles)
            - Pan‑Cryptodira
              - †Sinemydidae+†Xinjiangchelyidae?
              - Cryptodira (hidden-neck turtles)
                - Pan-Trionychia (soft-shelled and pig-nosed turtles)
                - - Pan-Testudinoidea (tortoises, pond turtles/terrapins, etc)
                  - - Pan-Chelonioidea (sea turtles, possibly including †Protostegidae)
                    - - Pan-Kinosternoidea (musk turtles, hickatee, etc)
                      - Chelydridae (snapping turtles)
