= Khorat Group =

- Stratigraphic range: Berriasian-Aptian; ~145–113 Ma
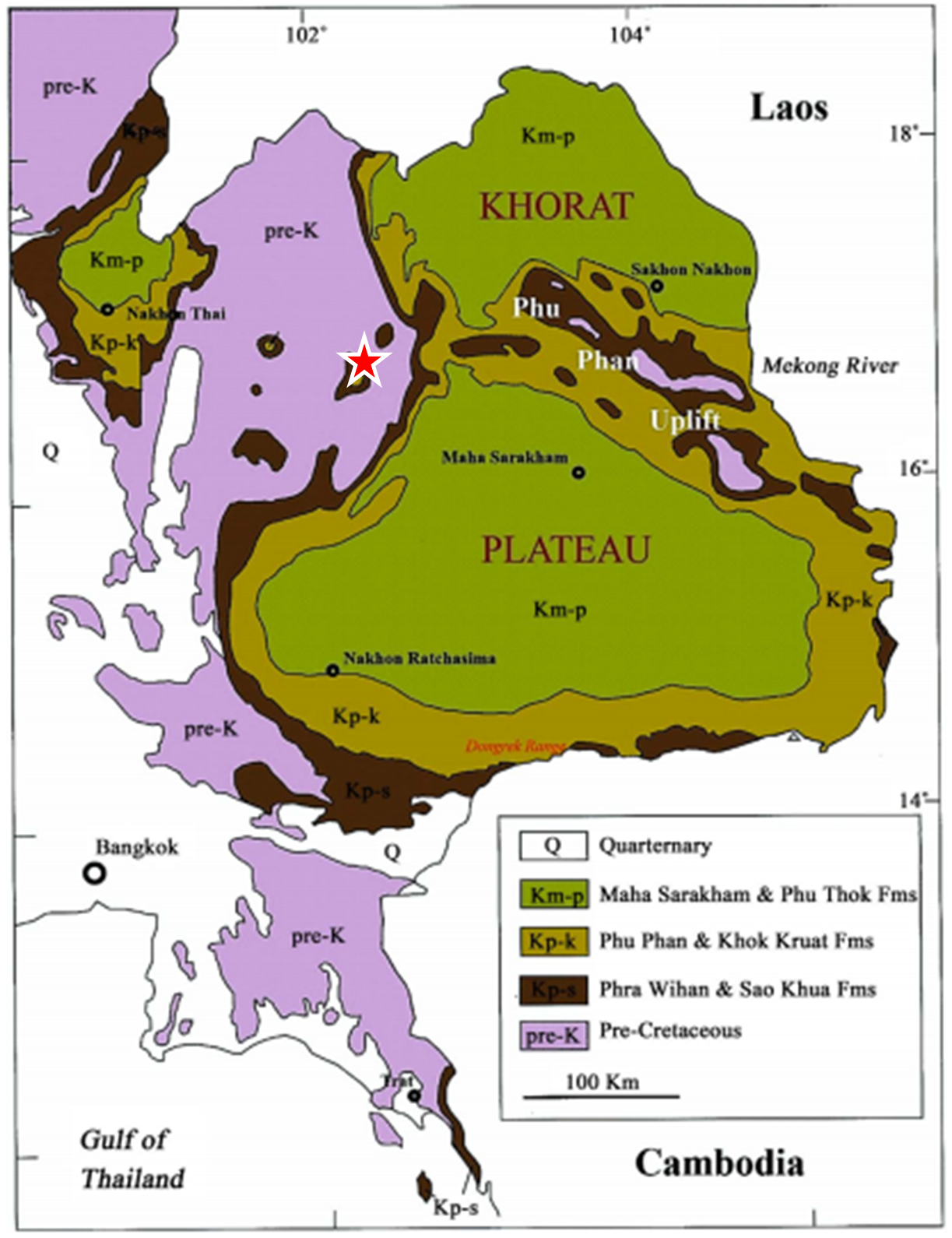
- Location of the Khorat Group within the Khorat Plateau (Brown and yellow)
- Type: stratigraphic group
- Sub-units: Khok Kruat Formation; Phu Phan Formation; Sao Khua Formation; Phra Wihan Formation; Phu Kradung Formation
- Underlies: Maha Sarakham Formation
- Overlies: Nam Phong Formation

Lithology
- Primary: Sandstone, mudstone

Location
- Region: Southeast Asia
- Country: Thailand
- Extent: Isan

Type section
- Named for: Khorat Plateau
- Named by: Ward & Bunnag
- Year defined: 1964

The Khorat Group is a stratigraphic group located within the Khorat Plateau in the Isan region of Thailand. It was first defined as the Khorat Series by Brown et al. in 1953 and was redefined as the Khorat Group by Ward and Bunnag in 1964, which gave it its current constituent formations as well as including the Nam Phong Formation, which is now excluded from the group. Subsequently, the sequence underwent several different stratigraphic proposals with several alternative divisions, but the formations proposed in Ward and Bunnag are the most widely used. Initially thought to be Triassic, the sequence has been shown to be of Early Cretaceous in age, Dating from the Berriasian to Aptian. It overlies the Nam Phong Formation and is overlain by the evaporitic deposits of the Maha Sarakham Formation. It consists of continental freshwater deposits largely of alternating sandstones and mudstones. The Group is notable for its fossil content, including those of dinosaurs.
