= Xintiangou Formation =

Geological formation in Sichuan, China

- Stratigraphic range: Late Toarcian-Aalenian 180–170 Ma
- Type: Geological formation
- Underlies: Shaximiao Formation
- Overlies: Ziliujing Formation
- Thickness: Over 400 metres (1,310 ft)

Lithology
- Primary: Mudstone, Sandstone
- Other: Limestone

Location
- Region: Sichuan
- Country: China
- Extent: Sichuan Basin

The Xintiangou Formation is a geological formation in China. Part of the stratigraphy of the Sichuan Basin, it is of an uncertain Middle Jurassic age, with preliminary U-Pb estimates giving an age range of 170 ma. It predominantly consists of interbedded mudstone and sandstone, with subordinate shelly limestone. At the Laojun site remains of lungfish, bony fish, freshwater sharks, temnospondyls, plesiosaurs, crocodyliformes, the Xinjiangchelyid turtle Protoxinjiangchelys and tritylodontids are known. The dinosaurs Sanxiasaurus, Yunyangosaurus, and indeterminate sauropods are also known from the formation. Theropod and ornithopod tracks have also been reported from the formation.
