= Phra Wihan Formation =

Geologic formation in Thailand

- Stratigraphic range: Berriasian-Valanginian; ~145–133.6 Ma
- Type: Geological formation
- Unit of: Khorat Group
- Underlies: Sao Khua Formation
- Overlies: Phu Kradung Formation
- Thickness: 150 m (490 ft)

Lithology
- Primary: Sandstone
- Other: Siltstone, mudstone, conglomerate

Location
- Coordinates: 16.1°N 103.9°E
- Approximate paleocoordinates: 14.3°N 111.4°E
- Region: Northeast Thailand (Khorat Basin)
- Country: Thailand
- Extent: Khorat Plateau

Type section
- Named for: Phra Wihan, an 11th-century Khmer Temple
- Named by: Ward & Bunnag
- Year defined: 1964
- Phra Wihan Formation (Thailand)

The Early Cretaceous Phra Wihan Formation is the second lowest member of the Mesozoic Khorat Group which outcrops in Northeast Thailand.

Comprises fine- to coarse-grained sheet and channelled sandstone beds and rarer variegated siltstone and mudstone. Intermittent conglomerate beds.

Deposited in a fluvial environment dominated by high-energy, shallow braided rivers with subordinate lower energy meandering river systems and associated flood plains.

The Phra Wihan Formation is considered to be Berriasian-Valanginian in age based on palynological analysis.

Sauropod (fossil) tracks have been recorded from this formation.

== See also ==
- List of dinosaur-bearing rock formations
  - List of stratigraphic units with sauropodomorph tracks
    - Sauropod tracks
