= Acrorhizodus =

Acrorhizodus Temporal range: Aptian –Albian

Scientific classification
- Kingdom: Animalia
- Phylum: Chordata
- Class: Chondrichthyes
- Order: †Hybodontiformes
- Genus: †Acrorhizodus; Cappetta, 2006

Type species
- †Acrorhizodus khoratensis Cappetta, 2006

Extinct shark genus

Acrorhizodus is an extinct genus of hybodont chondrichthyan currently containing only the species: Acrorhizodus khoratensis. It is known from the Albian to Aptian aged Khok Kruat formation of the Khok Pha Suam locality near the town of Si Mueang Mai, Thailand. It displays a mix of features which sets it apart from all hybodont families currently known.
