= Phu Phan Formation =

Geologic formation in Thailand

- Stratigraphic range: Barremian-Aptian; ~125–113 Ma
- Type: Geological formation
- Unit of: Khorat Group
- Underlies: Khok Kruat Formation
- Overlies: Sao Khua Formation

Lithology
- Primary: Sandstone
- Other: Siltstone, mudstone

Location
- Coordinates: 17.3°N 101.5°E
- Approximate paleocoordinates: 14.6°N 111.2°E
- Region: Indochina
- Country: Thailand
- Extent: Khorat Plateau

Type section
- Named by: Ward & Bunnag
- Year defined: 1964
- Phu Phan Formation (Thailand)

The Phu Phan Formation is an Early Cretaceous (Barremian to Aptian) geologic formation in Thailand. Fossil theropod tracks have been reported from the formation.

== See also ==
- List of dinosaur-bearing rock formations
  - List of stratigraphic units with theropod tracks
