= Khok Kruat Formation =

Geologic formation in Thailand

- Stratigraphic range: Aptian; ~120–113 Ma
- Type: Geological formation
- Unit of: Khorat Group
- Underlies: Maha Sarakham Formation
- Overlies: Phu Phan Formation

Lithology
- Primary: Sandstone, siltstone
- Other: Conglomerate, shale

Location
- Coordinates: 15.9°N 102.0°E
- Approximate paleocoordinates: 16.3°N 105.3°E
- Region: Indochina
- Country: Thailand
- Extent: Khorat Plateau

Type section
- Named by: Ward & Bunnag
- Year defined: 1964
- Khok Kruat Formation (Thailand)

The Khok Kruat Formation (Thai: หมวดหินโคกกรวด) is a rock formation found in northeastern Thailand. It is the uppermost formation of the Khorat Group.

It is dated to the Aptian stage of the Early Cretaceous period, and is notable for its fossils of dinosaurs. It is equivalent to the Gres superieurs Formation of Laos. The group is a fluvial formation consisting primarily of red siltstones and sandstones.

== Fossil content ==
| Color key: Taxon / Reclassified taxon / Taxon falsely reported as present / Dubious taxon or junior synonym / Ichnotaxon / Ootaxon / Morphotaxon | Notes; Uncertain or tentative taxa are in small text; ~~crossed out~~ taxa are discredited. |

The Khok Kruat Formation has yielded remains of sharks, fishes, turtles, crocodilians and pterosaurs. Phuwiangosaurus-like teeth, Siamosaurus teeth, and fragmentary postcranial remains of spinosaurids have also been recovered from it. Fukuiraptor-like teeth have also been recovered from the formation.

=== Reptiles ===
==== Dinosaurs ====
===== Ornithischians =====
Ornithischians reported from the Khok Kruat Formation
| Genus | Species | Location | Material | Notes | Images |
|---|---|---|---|---|---|
| Iguanodontia Indet. | Indeterminate | Khok Pha Suam locality, Ubon Ratchathani province. | Teeth, vertebrae and limb bones | | |
| Psittacosaurus | P. sattayaraki | Ban Dong Bang Noi, Chaiyaphum Province | "Well preserved left dentary and an incomplete maxilla." | A psittacosaurid ceratopsian | |
| Ratchasimasaurus | R. suranareae | Nakhon Ratchasima province. | A complete left dentary with no teeth | A styracosternan iguanodontian | |
| Siamodon | S. nimngami | Ban Saphan Hin | PRC-4, a well-preserved left maxilla, PRC-5, an isolated maxillary tooth and PRC-6, a braincase. | A styracosternan iguanodontian | |
| Sirindhorna | S. khoratensis | Muaeng Nakhon Ratchasima District, Nakhon Ratchasima Province. | | A styracosternan iguanodontian | |

===== Sauropods =====
Sauropods reported from the Khok Kruat Formation
| Genus | Species | Location | Material | Notes | Images |
|---|---|---|---|---|---|
| Macronaria Indet. | Indeterminate | Khok Pha Suam locality, Ubon Ratchathani province. | Femur of juvenile, isolated teeth | | |
| Nagatitan | N. chaiyaphumensis | Ban Pha Nang Sua | several vertebrae, parts of the pelvis, and parts of the forelimb and hindlimb. | A euelopodid somphospondylian | |

===== Theropods =====
Theropods reported from the Khok Kruat Formation
| Genus | Species | Location | Material | Notes | Images |
|---|---|---|---|---|---|
| cf. Asianopodus | cf. A. isp. | "Huai Dam Chum site, Ban Lao Nat, Tha Uthen District, Nakhon Phanom Province". | "At least 79 trackways composed of 341 consecutive tracks in total". | Theropod tracks. | |
| Ichnogen. et. sp. indet. | | "Huai Dam Chum site, Ban Lao Nat, Tha Uthen District, Nakhon Phanom Province". | "Two trackways: T23 composed of 6 consecutive tracks and T35 composed of 3 discontinuous tracks". | Flattened possible theropod tracks. | |
| Ornithomimosauria Indet. | Indeterminate | Ban Krok Duean Ha | "NRRU-F01020052, distal part of the right metatarsal III" | A ornithomimosaurian theropod | |
| Spinosaurinae Indet. | Indeterminate, some tentatively assigned to Siamosaurus | | Teeth, postcranial materials (SM-KK 14) | A spinosaurine spinosaurid | |
| Siamraptor | S. suwati | Muaeng Nakhon Ratchasima District, Nakhon Ratchasima Province. | "A composite cranial and postcranial skeleton comprising premaxilla, maxilla, jugal, surangular, prearticular, articular, vertebrae, manual ungual, ischium, tibia, and pedal phalanx". | A carcharodontosaurian theropod | |

==== Pseudosuchians ====
Pseudosuchians reported from the Khok Kruat Formation
| Genus | Species | Location | Material | Notes | Images |
|---|---|---|---|---|---|
| Atoposauridae indet. | Indeterminate | Lam Pao Reservoir, Ban Noi, Sahatsakhan district, Kalasin province. | An isolated lanceolate tooth (PRCMR 282). | May be attributable to Theriosuchus. | |
| Goniopholididae indet. | Indeterminate | Khok Pha Suam locality, Ubon Ratchathani province. | Complete left mandible (SM2021-1-112). | | |
| Khoratosuchus | K. jintasakuli | Ban Saphan Hin, Nakhon Ratchasima province. | A partial skull (NNRU-A 1803). | A neosuchian crocodylomorph | |

==== Pterosaurs ====
Pterosaurs reported from the Khok Kruat Formation
| Genus | Species | Location | Material | Notes | Images |
|---|---|---|---|---|---|
| Anhangueridae Indet. | Indeterminate | Khok Pha Suam locality, Ubon Ratchathani province. | Isolated teeth | | |

==== Turtles ====
Turtles reported from the Khok Kruat Formation
| Genus | Species | Location | Material | Notes | Images |
|---|---|---|---|---|---|
| Kizylkumemys | K. khoratensis | Ban Saphan Hin and Ban Khok Kruat localities, Nakhon Ratchasima province. | Shell material. | A carettochelyid turtle | |
| Shachemys | S. sp. | Ban Saphan Hin, Nakhon Ratchasima province. | Shell material. | A adocid turtle; remains too fragmentary for specific assignment. | |

=== Fish ===
==== Bony fish ====
Bony fish reported from the Khok Kruat Formation
| Genus | Species | Location | Material | Notes | Images |
|---|---|---|---|---|---|
| Ginglymodi Indet. | Indeterminate | Khok Pha Suam locality, Ubon Ratchathani province. | Scales | Two types are known. | |
| Khoratamia | K. phattharajani | Ban Krok Duean Ha, Nakhon Ratchasima province. | Holotype (NRRU-F01020023), paratype (NRRU-F01020024) and a patch of scales (NRRU-F01020025). | A amiid fish | |
| Lanxangichthys | L. sp. | Khok Pha Suam, Ubon Ratchathani province. | | A lepisosteiform fish | |

==== Cartilaginous fish ====
Cartilaginous fish reported from the Khok Kruat Formation
| Genus | Species | Location | Material | Notes | Images |
|---|---|---|---|---|---|
| Acrorhizodus | A. khoratensis | Khok Pha Suam locality, Ubon Ratchathani province. | 5 teeth, most of them incomplete. | A hybodont shark | |
| Heteroptychodus | H. aff. steinmanni | Khok Pha Suam locality, Ubon Ratchathani province. | 20 teeth, most incomplete. | A hybodont shark | |
| Hybodus? | H.? sp. | Khok Pha Suam locality, Ubon Ratchathani province. | 22 incomplete teeth. | Possibly represents a new genus, but the available material is too fragmentary to warrant erecting a new taxon. | |
| "Hybodus" | "H." aequitridentatus | Khok Pha Suam locality, Ubon Ratchathani province. | | A thaiodontid hybodont | |
| Khoratodus | K. foreyi | Khok Pha Suam locality, Ubon Ratchathani province. | | A thaiodontid hybodont | |
| Thaiodus | T. ruchae | Khok Pha Suam locality, Ubon Ratchathani province. | One incomplete tooth. | A thaiodontid hybodont | |

== See also ==
- List of dinosaur-bearing rock formations
