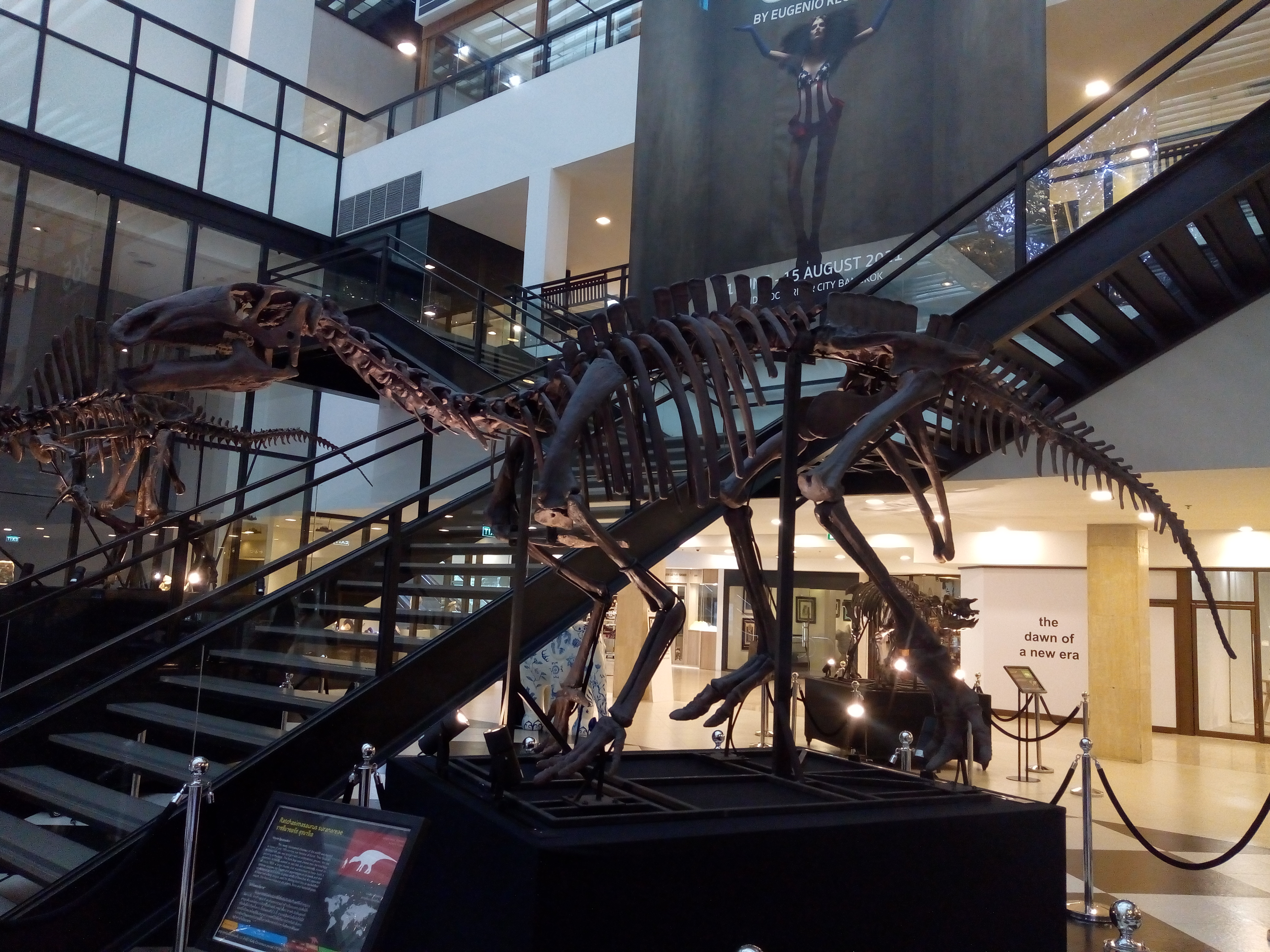
- Mounted skeleton

Scientific classification
- Kingdom: Animalia
- Phylum: Chordata
- Class: Reptilia
- Clade: Dinosauria
- Clade: †Ornithischia
- Clade: †Ornithopoda
- Clade: †Iguanodontia
- Genus: †Ratchasimasaurus; Shibata, Jintasakul & Azuma, 2011

Type species
- †Ratchasimasaurus suranareae Shibata, Jintasakul & Azuma, 2011

= Ratchasimasaurus =

Ratchasimasaurus Temporal range: Aptian ~120–113 Ma

Extinct genus of dinosaurs

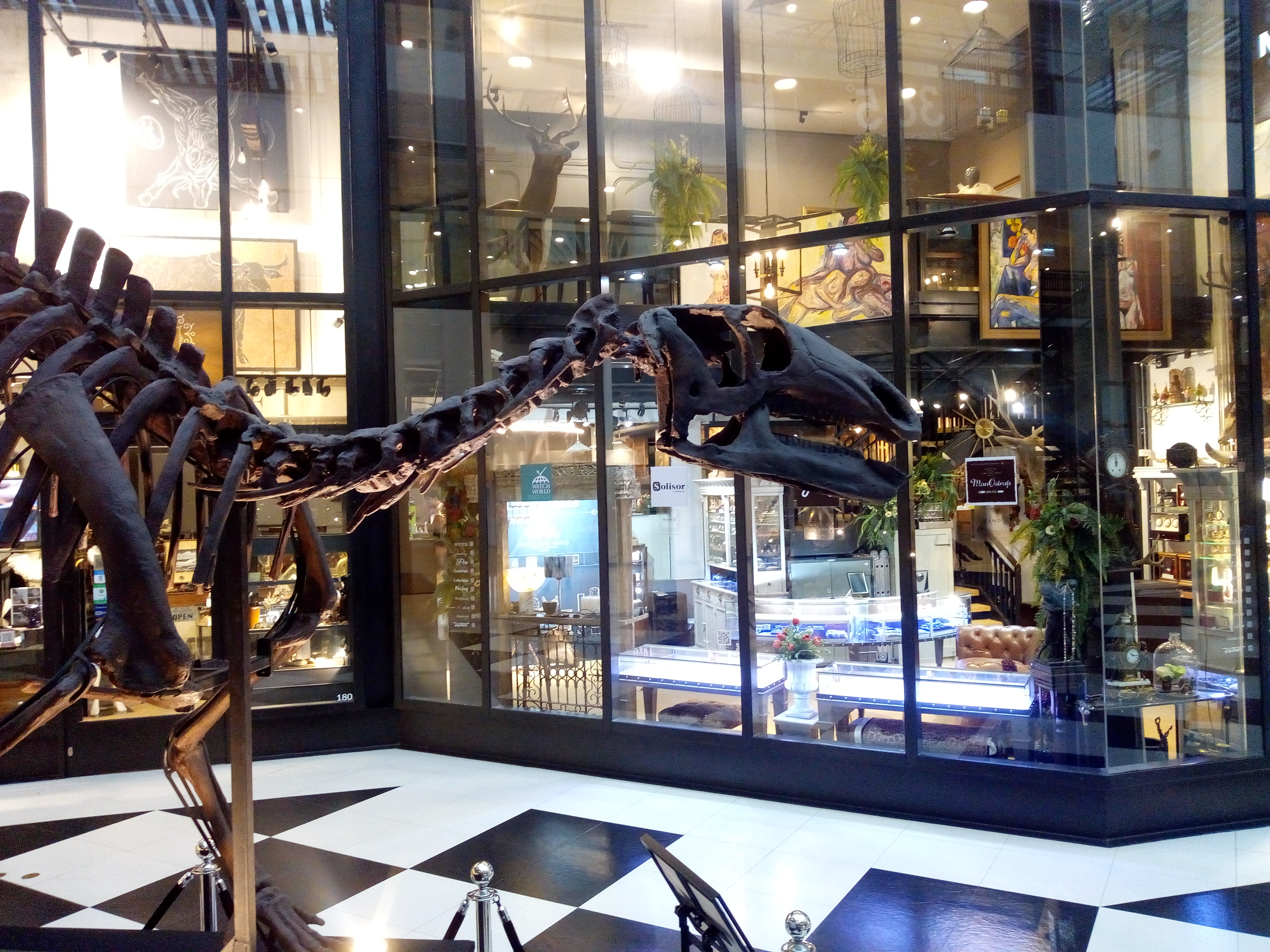
Different angle of the mounted skeleton

Ratchasimasaurus (meaning "Nakhon Ratchasima lizard") is a genus of iguanodontian ornithopod dinosaur from Early Cretaceous (Aptian stage) Khok Kruat Formation of Nakhon Ratchasima province in northeastern Thailand. The type and only species is R. suranareae, named after Thao Suranari, a 19th-century war heroine. It was considered by one study to be a nomen dubium, diagnosed with characters widespread in Styracosterna.

== Discovery and naming ==
Ratchasimasaurus was initially known as the "Probactrosaurus-like" iguanodontian and is only known from the holotype (specimen NRRU-A2064), a complete left dentary with no teeth that was found in the Khok Kruat Formation in Thailand by a local farmer near a pond, likely around c. 2002 – c. 2004; NRRU-A2064 was mentioned by Norman in 2004 in a phylogenenetic analysis. The genus was named in 2011 by Shibata, Jintasakul & Azuma. The holotype is currently housed in The Northeastern Research Institute of Petrified Wood and Mineral Resources (NRIPM) and a mounted skeleton exists in River City, Bangkok.

== Description ==
One autapomorphy (unique characteristic) of Ratchasimasaurus is its elongated and flat ramus of the dentary. Ratchasimasaurus shows both primitive and derived characters for Iguanodontia, such as "a caudally inclined coronoid process and alveolar trough with a primitive crown impression, and a derived buccal shelf between the tooth row and the coronoid process". The length of the dentary is 198.1 millimetres (7.80 in).
