= Larachelus =

Larachelus Temporal range: Early Cretaceous

Scientific classification
- Domain: Eukaryota
- Kingdom: Animalia
- Phylum: Chordata
- Class: Reptilia
- Order: Testudines
- Suborder: Cryptodira
- Genus: †Larachelus; Pérez-García & Murelaga, 2012

Type species
- †Larachelus morla Pérez-García & Murelaga, 2012

Extinct genus of turtles

Larachelus is an extinct genus of xinjiangchelyid turtle known from the Early Cretaceous (late Hauterivian to early Barremian stage) of Spain.
