= Hojapil Sanctuary =

Protected area in Turkmenistan

- Location: Lebap Province, Turkmenistan
- Area: 17,532 ha (43,320 acres)
- Established: 1986

Hojapil Sanctuary is a sanctuary (zakaznik) of Turkmenistan and a part of Köýtendag Nature Reserve. It was established in 1986.

== Sites ==
=== Dinosaur Plateau ===
An inclined limestone slab—spanning about 0.5 km in length and 0.2 km in width—preserving hundreds of dinosaur footprints, is a popular tourist attraction. The site was discovered by Soviet geologists in the 80s; Turkmen scientists propose the evidence to be suggestive of three new dinosaur species: Gissarosaurus, Hojapilosaurus, and Turkmenosaurus. In local tradition, the footprints were cast by elephants belonging either to the forces of Alexander the Great or some returning pilgrim from India.

=== Kyrk Gyz Cave ===
A sacred site in Turkmen tradition, the floor of the cave has a tomb. Local legends explain the cave to have been created in an act of God, when 40 women—fearing capture by rogues—prayed for protection.

=== Umbardepe Canyon ===
A waterfall with a height of 27 meters is popular among tourists.
