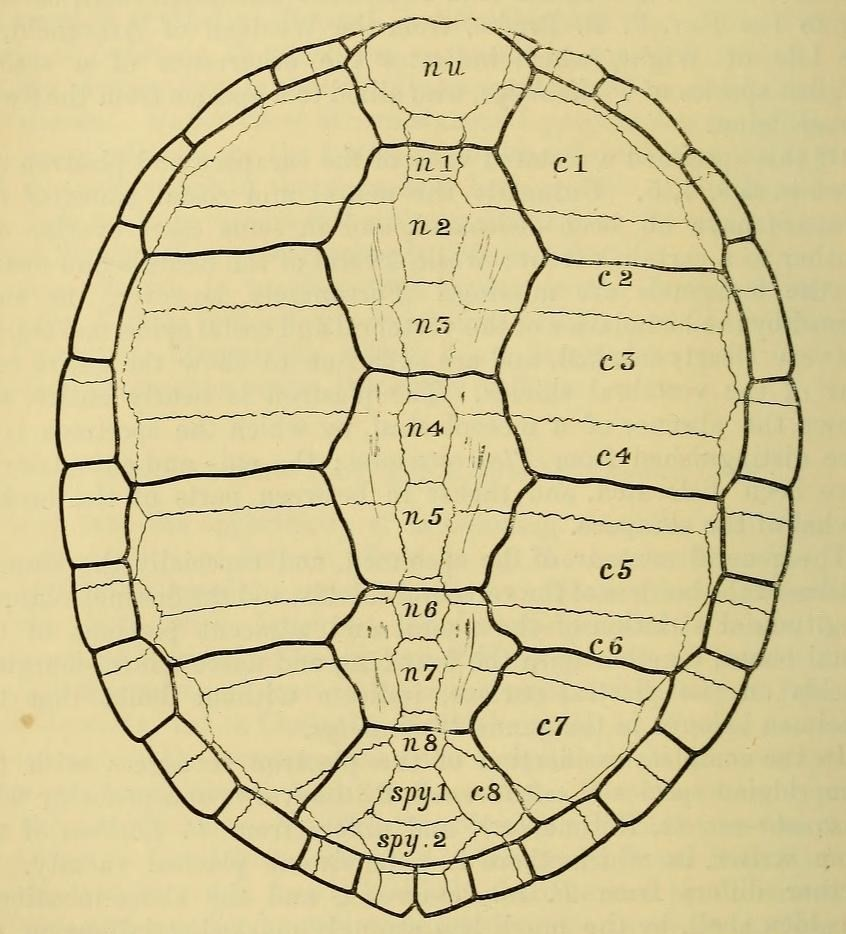
- Carapace of Brodiechelys restoration

Scientific classification
- Domain: Eukaryota
- Kingdom: Animalia
- Phylum: Chordata
- Class: Reptilia
- Clade: Pantestudines
- Clade: Testudinata
- Family: †Xinjiangchelyidae
- Genus: †Brodiechelys; Nopcsa, 1928

Type species
- †Plesiochelys brodiei Lydekker, 1889

Species
- †B. brodiei (Lydekker, 1889); †B. royoi Pérez-García et al., 2014

Synonyms
- Synonyms of B. brodiei: Plesiochelys brodiei Lydekker, 1889; Plesiochelys valdensis Lydekker, 1889; Plesiochelys vectensis Hooley 1990

= Brodiechelys =

Brodiechelys Temporal range: Berriasian to Barremian, 140.2–122.46 Ma

Extinct genus of turtles

Brodiechelys is an extinct genus of terrestrial turtle belonging to the family Xinjiangchelyidae. Remains of Brodiechelys dated back to the Early Cretaceous period (Berriasian to Barremian stages), and have been found in the United Kingdom and Spain.

The type species, B. brodiei, was thought to only come from the Wealden of the United Kingdom, however, specimens of ten shells were found in the locality of Brighstone Bay in the Wessex Sub-basin of the Isle of Wight, UK. Fragmentary specimens of shell corresponding to an indeterminate species were also found outside Wealden; these specimens were unearthed in the Weald Sub-basin of Sussex, UK. The discovery of the species B. royoi in the Maestrazgo Basin of Morella, Spain had made paleontologists realize that some freshwater turtle taxa had a wide European distribution during the Early Cretaceous, and at the same time being present in both the UK and the Iberian Peninsula. B. royoi was assigned to Brodiechelys due to the identified similarities it had with B. brodiei, however, B. royoi possessed several autapomorphies, and therefore its specimens could not have belonged to B. brodiei.
