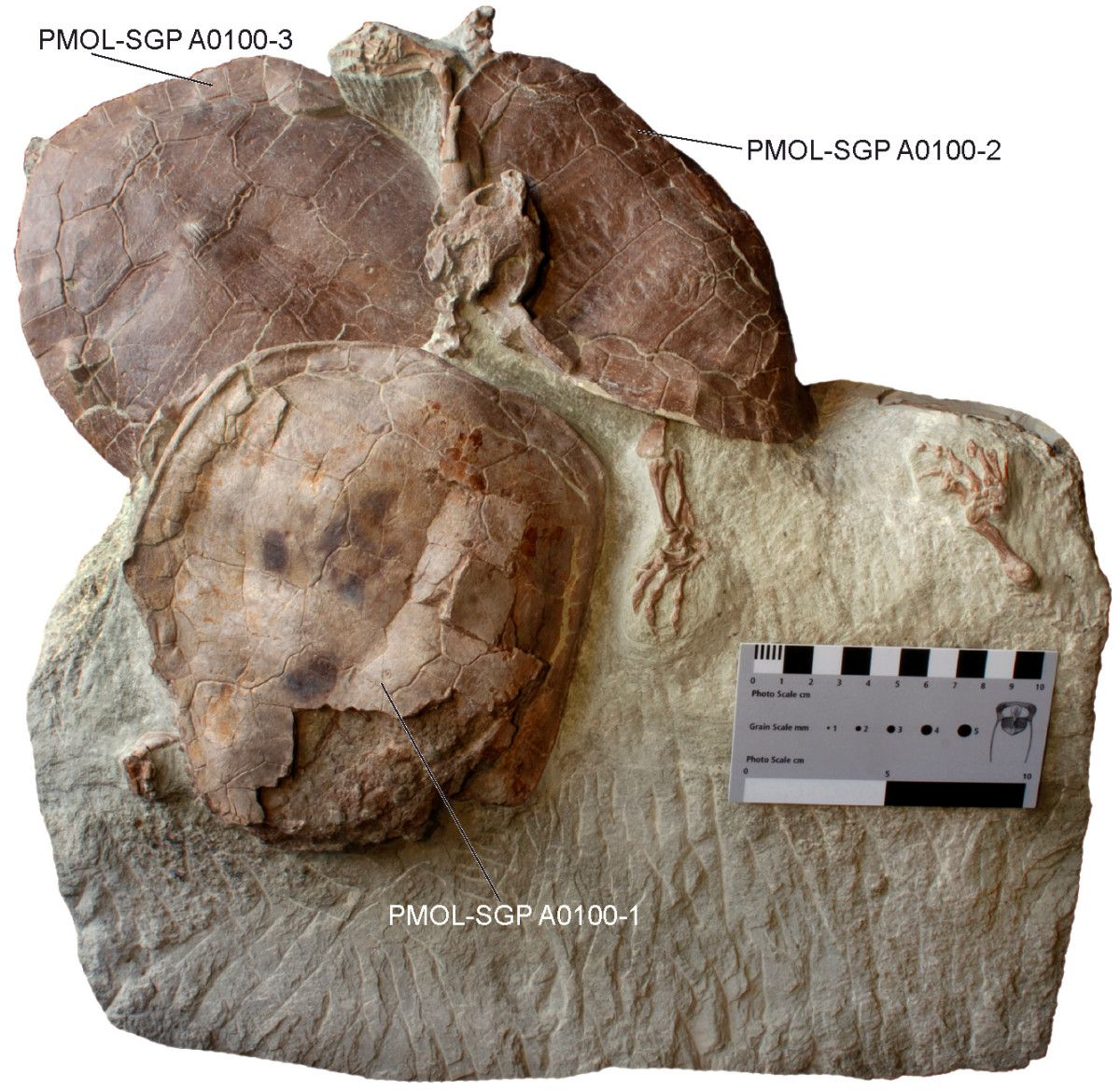
- Syntype specimens of X. wusu

Scientific classification
- Domain: Eukaryota
- Kingdom: Animalia
- Phylum: Chordata
- Class: Reptilia
- Clade: Pantestudines
- Clade: Testudinata
- Family: †Xinjiangchelyidae
- Genus: †Xinjiangchelys; Yeh, 1986

Type species
- Xinjiangchelys junggarensis Yeh, 1986

Species
- See text

= Xinjiangchelys =

Xinjiangchelys Temporal range: Callovian–Aptian

Extinct genus of turtles

Xinjiangchelys is an extinct genus of xinjiangchelyid turtle known from the Middle Jurassic to Early Cretaceous of China and Kyrgyzstan. It is known from over 11 different species.

== Taxonomy ==
- Xinjiangchelys chowi
- Xinjiangchelys jingyanensis
- Xinjiangchelys jinyanensis
- Xinjiangchelys junggarensis (= Xinjiangchelys latimarginalis)
- Xinjiangchelys latiens
- Xinjiangchelys levensis
- Xinjiangchelys naryensis
- Xinjiangchelys oshanensis
- Xinjiangchelys qiguensis
- Xinjiangchelys radiplicatoides
- Xinjiangchelys radiplicatus
- Xinjiangchelys tianshanensis
- Xinjiangchelys wuerhoensis
- Xinjiangchelys wusu
