= Basilochelys =

Basilochelys Temporal range: Early Cretaceous, Berriasian

Scientific classification
- Kingdom: Animalia
- Phylum: Chordata
- Class: Reptilia
- Order: Testudines
- Suborder: Cryptodira
- Superfamily: Trionychia
- Genus: †Basilochelys; Tong et al., 2009

Type species
- †Basilochelys macrobios Tong et al., 2009

Extinct genus of turtles

Basilochelys is an extinct genus of land turtle which existed during the early Cretaceous period (Berriasian). Containing the sole species Basilochelys macrobios, its fossils have been found in the Phu Kradung Formation of Northeast Thailand. It is considered to be the most basal member of the group Trionychoidae.
