= Yunyangosaurus =

Yunyangosaurus Temporal range: Middle Jurassic, 175–161 Ma

Scientific classification
- Kingdom: Animalia
- Phylum: Chordata
- Class: Reptilia
- Clade: Dinosauria
- Clade: Saurischia
- Clade: Theropoda
- Superfamily: †Megalosauroidea
- Genus: †Yunyangosaurus; Dai et al., 2020 vide Dai, 2019

Type species
- †Yunyangosaurus puanensis Dai et al., 2020

Genus of reptiles (fossil)

Yunyangosaurus (meaning "Yunyang County lizard") is a genus of possible megalosauroid dinosaur from the Xintiangou Formation in Chongqing, China. The type and only species is Yunyangosaurus puanensis. The name was first published in the 2019 SVP abstract book by Dai (2019) before it was formally described by Dai et al. (2020). Yunyangosaurus had a single specimen, CLGPR v00002.

The holotype specimen consists of a disarticulated partial skeleton consisting of "eleven presacral vertebrae, several cervical and dorsal ribs and chevrons." Judging from the remains, the animal would have been 4.7 meters (15.4 feet) long.
