= Nam Phong Formation =

Geologic formation in Thailand

- Stratigraphic range: Early Jurassic; Pliensbachian
- Type: Geological formation
- Underlies: Phu Kradung Formation
- Overlies: Indosinian II Unconformity
- Thickness: 1,465 m (4,806 ft)

Lithology
- Primary: Sandstone
- Other: Conglomerate, siltstone, mudstone

Location
- Coordinates: 16.3°N 102.0°E
- Approximate paleocoordinates: 20.9°S 93.0°E
- Region: Isan
- Country: Thailand
- Extent: Khorat Plateau

Type section
- Named by: Ward & Bunnag
- Year defined: 1964
- Nam Phong Formation (Thailand)

The Nam Phong Formation, which correlates to the Indosinian III Unconformity, is a geological formation in Thailand. It underlies the Khorat Group. It consists of resistant, red-brown micaceous sandstones, conglomerates, siltstones and mudstones of mainly fluvial origin. The sandstones are medium to very fine-grained and are usually calcareous. The conglomerates contain pebbles of quartz, brown and grey chert, and reddish brown siltstone. Cross bedding and plane-bed stratification are common in the sandstones and conglomerates. The sandstones and conglomerates make up approximately 30% of the formation. This sedimentary rock formation is found in Khon Kaen Province, Thailand. Originally thought to have dated to the Late Triassic, U-Pb zircon dating confidently supported that the rock layers bearing the fossils of Isanosaurus were deposited during the Pliensbachian stage of the Early Jurassic.

== Vertebrate paleofauna ==
Indeterminate prosauropod remains are present in Khon Kaen Province.

Vertebrates of the Nam Phong Formation
Genus	Species	Location	Stratigraphic position	Material	Notes	Images
Isanosaurus	I. attavipachi	Khon Kaen Province		"Associated fragmentary vertebrae, ribs, chevrons, scapula, sternal, femur."		

== Correlations ==
The formation has been correlated with the Lower Elliot Formation (Karoo Basin) and Forest Sandstone of Africa, the Caturrita Formation of the Paraná Basin in Brazil, the Laguna Colorada and Los Colorados Formations (Ischigualasto-Villa Unión Basin) of Argentina, the Chinle Formation of North America, the Trössingen Formation of the Keuper Group of Germany, and the Lower Dharmaram Formation of India.

== See also ==
- List of dinosaur-bearing rock formations
