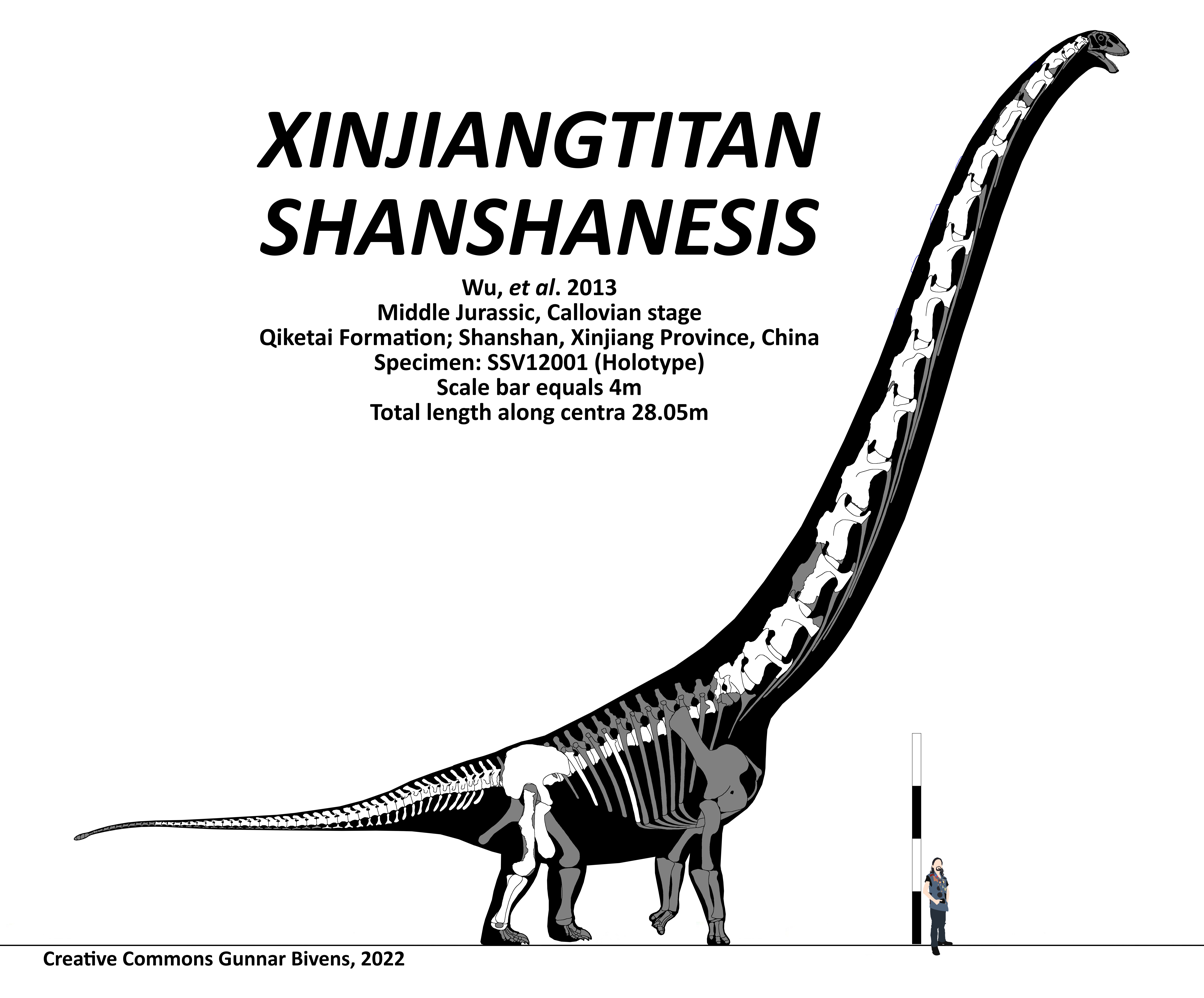
- Reconstructed skeleton showing known remains of the holotype in white

Scientific classification
- Kingdom: Animalia
- Phylum: Chordata
- Class: Reptilia
- Clade: Dinosauria
- Clade: Saurischia
- Clade: †Sauropodomorpha
- Clade: †Sauropoda
- Clade: †Eusauropoda
- Family: †Mamenchisauridae
- Genus: †Xinjiangtitan; Wu et al., 2013

Type species
- †Xinjiangtitan shanshanesis Wu et al., 2013

= Xinjiangtitan =

Xinjiangtitan Temporal range: Middle Jurassic, 164.6 Ma

Extinct genus of reptiles

Xinjiangtitan (Chinese: 新疆巨龙; pinyin: Xīnjiāngjùlóng) is an extinct genus of mamenchisaurid sauropod that lived during the Middle Jurassic of what is now Xinjiang, northwestern China. Its type and only species is Xinjiangtitan shanshanesis (Chinese: 鄯善新疆巨龙; pinyin: Shànshàn Xīnjiāngjùlóng), known from a single incomplete skeleton recovered from the Qiketai Formation. This holotype preserves one of the most complete vertebral columns of any sauropod found in Asia, and has the longest complete neck known for any animal.

== Discovery ==
The type specimen of Xinjiangtitan shanshanesis was discovered by a joint expedition of Jilin University, Shenyang Normal University, and Xinjiang Geological Survey Institute in 2012, from a quarry 8 kilometres (5.0 mi) south of Qiketai, Xinjiang. In 2013, before the specimen had been fully excavated, Wu Wen-hao, Zhou Chang-fu, Oliver Wings, Toru Sekiha and Dong Zhiming described it as a new genus and species, Xinjiangtitan shanshanesis. The generic name is derived from Xinjiang, and from titan, giant in Greek mythology. The specific name, shanshanesis, is derived from an alternative name for the county where it was found, Shanshan, named after the ancient Shanshan Kingdom. The specific name is occasionally misspelled as "shanshanensis" or "shashaensis", which are invalid spellings even though the correct form would indeed have been "shanshanensis" rather than shanshanesis, as the Latin suffix "-ensis" meaning "from", was used to create the name. Continued excavation of the type specimen revealed that the neck and tail were nearly complete.

The specimen was originally reported as being from the Qigu Formation (Late Jurassic), but it was subsequently considered to be from the Qiketai Formation (Middle Jurassic).

=== Fossils ===
Xinjiangtitan shanshanesis is known from a single specimen, the holotype SSV12001, which consists of a nearly complete vertebral column preserved in articulation, as well as a partial skull, partial pelvis, and most of the left hind limb. The neck, of which all 18 vertebrae are present, is nearly 15 m (49 ft) long and is the longest complete neck ever discovered of any animal; these cervical vertebrae were described in 2018. The dorsal vertebrae were described in 2022. Overall, the vertebral column is among the most complete of any sauropod specimen from Asia.

== Description ==
Size comparison

Xinjiangtitan was one of the longest known sauropods, measuring 30–32 metres (98–105 ft) long and weighing up to 40 metric tons (44 short tons). Xinjiangtitan was diagnosed based on the following traits: the presence of a ventral keel on the penultimate cervical centrum that forms a small semicircular process under the distal articular facet; both cervical vertebrae are relatively elongated; the sacricostal yoke except the first sacral rib; and an extremely robust femur. The series of dorsal vertebrae has a length of 3.72 m (12.2 ft). The femur is 1.65 m (5.4 ft) long, and the tibia is 0.98 m (3.2 ft) long. Its long neck is measured at least 14.9 m (49 ft) in length.

== Phylogeny ==
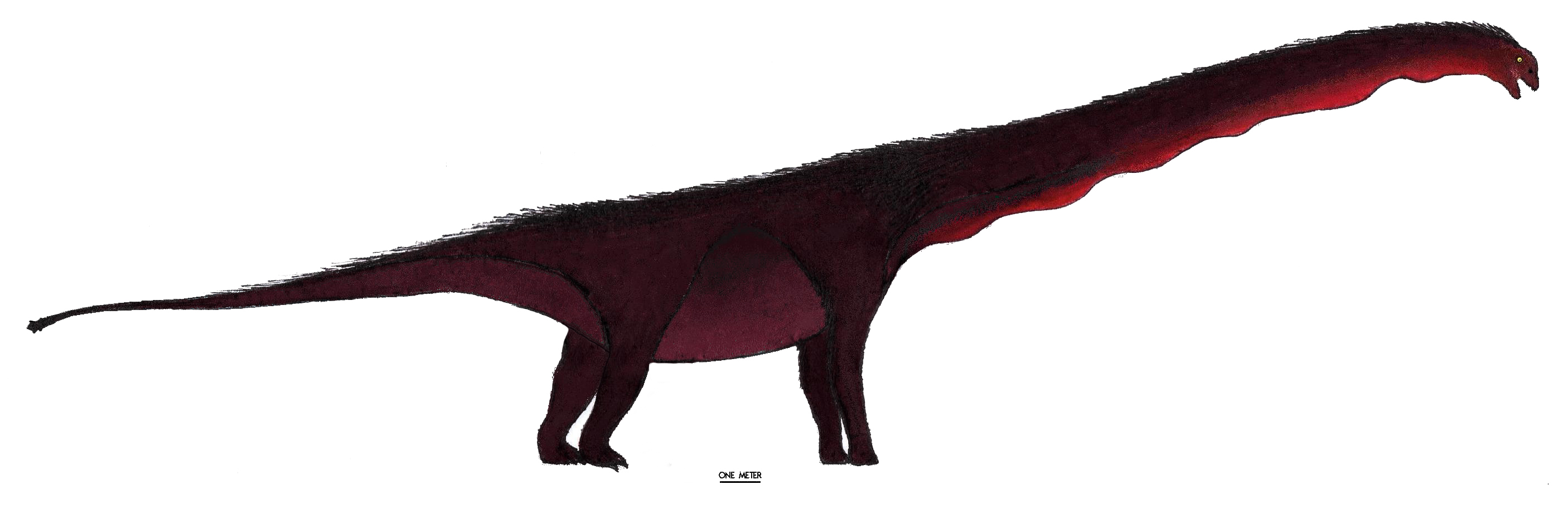
Restoration

Among sauropods, the phylogenetic analysis from its description places Xinjiangtitan as the sister taxon of Mamenchisaurus, the only other mamenchisaurid included. Xinjiangtitan shares several derived characters with diplodocids, including prominent ambiens process of pubis, relatively short hind limb and fourth trochanter on the femur that is caudomedially developed.
