= Sao Khua Formation =

Early Cretaceous geological formation in Thailand

- Stratigraphic range: late Valanginian-early Hauterivian; ~133.6–132.1 Ma
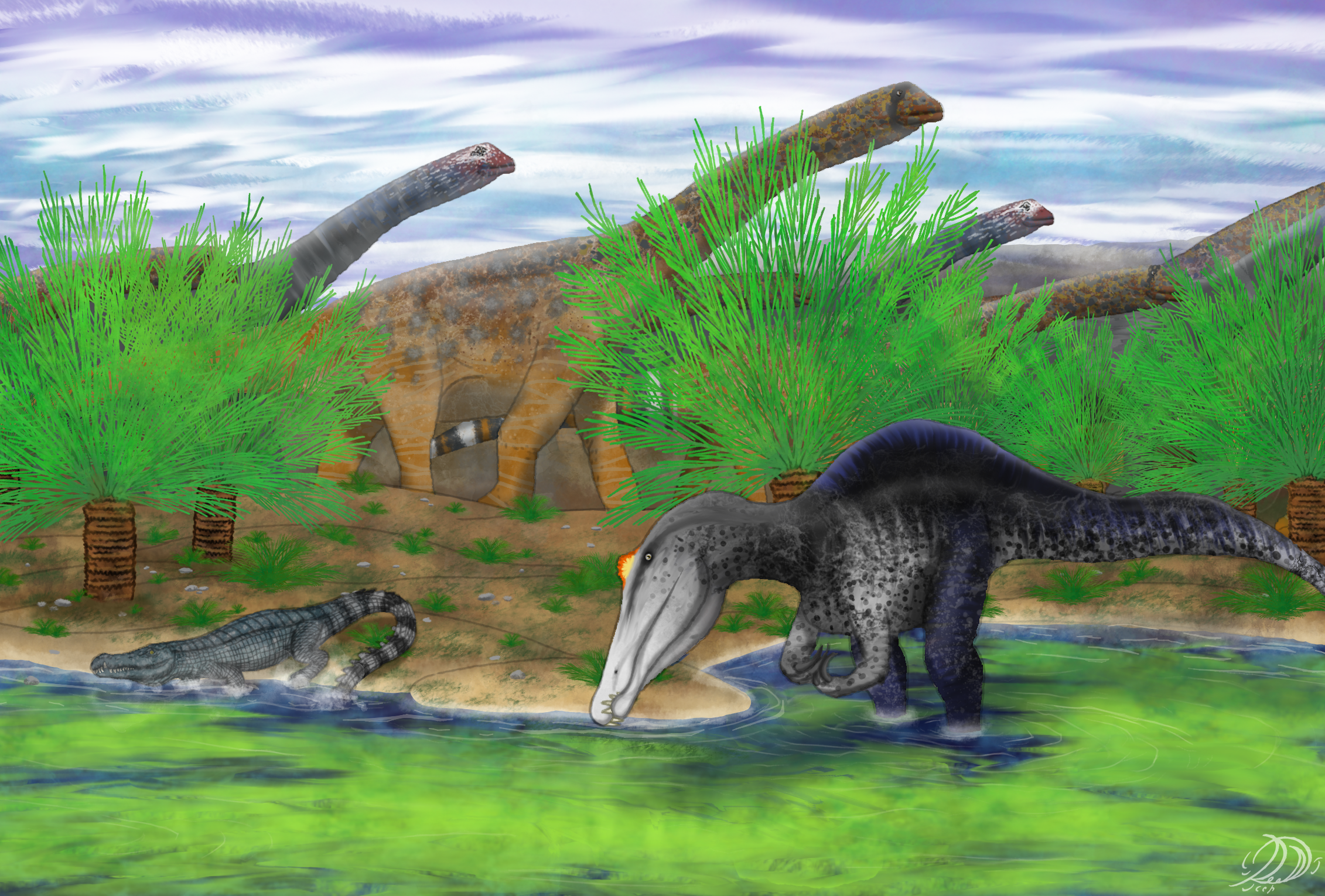
- Restoration of Siamosaurus, Sunosuchus and Phuwiangosaurus in the Sao Khua Formation palaeoenvironment.
- Type: Geological formation
- Unit of: Khorat Group
- Underlies: Phu Phan Formation
- Overlies: Phra Wihan Formation
- Thickness: ~120 m (390 ft)

Lithology
- Primary: Sandstone, conglomerate
- Other: Siltstone, claystone

Location
- Coordinates: 16.7°N 102.3°E
- Approximate paleocoordinates: 14.3°N 112.4°E
- Region: Indochina
- Country: Thailand
- Extent: Khorat Plateau

Type section
- Named by: Ward & Bunnag
- Year defined: 1964
- Sao Khua Formation (Thailand)

The Sao Khua Formation (Thai: หมวดหินเสาขัว) is a middle member of the Khorat Group. It consists of an alteration of pale red to yellowish-gray, fine to medium-grained sandstone and grayish-reddish brown siltstone and clay. Rare pale red to light gray conglomerates, containing carbonate pebbles, are also characteristic of this formation. This geological formation in Thailand dates to the Early Cretaceous age, specifically the Valanginian through Hauterivian stages.

Dinosaur remains are among the fossils that have been recovered from the formation.

== Depositional environment ==
Based on paleosols and lithostratigraphy, the Sao Khua Formation is believed to have been deposited in a warm to slightly cool semi-arid climate by a meandering river system. Geochemistry is indicative of a stable humid subtropical climate regime, and sedimentation is thought to have occurred in a floodplain setting which was fed by bedload-rich large meandering channels. Paleocurrent analysis suggests the sand channels at the time of deposition of the formation probably formed a braided channel environment.

== Fossil content ==
| Color key: Taxon / Reclassified taxon / Taxon falsely reported as present / Dubious taxon or junior synonym / Ichnotaxon / Ootaxon / Morphotaxon | Notes; Uncertain or tentative taxa are in small text; ~~crossed out~~ taxa are discredited. |

=== Amphibians ===
Amphibians reported from the Sao Khua Formation
| Genus | Species | Presence | Material | Notes | Images |
|---|---|---|---|---|---|
| Anura indet. | Indeterminate | Nong Bua Lamphu province. | Humeri (SHM-PT 529 and SHM-PT 530) and a pelvic girdle (SHM-HY 231). | A frog | |

=== Reptiles ===
==== Dinosaurs ====
Dinosaurs reported from the Sao Khua Formation
| Genus | Species | Presence | Material | Notes | Images |
|---|---|---|---|---|---|
| Brachiosauridae indet. | Indeterminate | Phu Wat B Locality, Phu Kao Mountain range | Dental remains | A brachiosaurid sauropod; similar to other brachiosaurid teeth. | |
| Carcharodontosauridae indet. | Indeterminate | Locality Phu Wiang 1a, Khon Kaen province. | PRC-61, "Fragment of the posterior part of a right maxilla". | A carcharodontosaurid theropod | |
| Compsognathidae? indet. | Indeterminate | | | A very small compsognathid theropod | |
| Dicraeosauridae indet. | Indeterminate | Phra Prong | Single tooth | A dicraeosaurid sauropod | |
| Diplodocoidea indet. | Indeterminate | | Two cervical vertebra from same individual | A diplodocoid sauropod | |
| Kinnareemimus | K. khonkaenensis | Locality Phu Wiang 5, Phu Wiang district, Khon Kaen province. | Vertebral, pelvic and limb elements. | An ornithomimosaurian theropod | |
| Ornithurae? Indet. | Indeterminate | Khok Kong, Kalasin province. | A humerus fragment. | A ornithurine ornithuran; may represent an early ornithurine, and probably is not an enantiornithine. | |
| Phuwiangosaurus | P. sirindhornae | Khon Kaen province. Nong Bua Lamphu Province. | "Partial skeletons, juvenile - adult", & 2 additional vertebrae. A scapula and a partial skeleton have also been referred. | A euhelopodid somphospondylian | |
| Ceratosuchini Indet. (Phuwiang spinosaurid B) | Indeterminate | PW9 'Hin Lad Yao' locality site A and site B, Phu Wiang district, Khon Kaen province. | Caudal vertebrae. | A ceratosuchin baryonychine | |
| Phuwiangvenator | P. yaemniyomi | Phu Wiang Site 9B, Phu Wiang Mountain, Khon Kaen province. | Partial skeleton including vertebral and limb elements. | A megaraptoran theropod | |
| Siamosaurus | S. suteethorni | | Isolated teeth. | A potentially dubious spinosaurine spinosaurid. | |
| Siamotyrannus | S. isanensis | | "Pelvis, dorsal, sacral, and caudal vertebrae." | A avetheropodan tetanuran | |
| Somphospondyli Indet. | indeterminate | Nong Sung locality, Phu Singha locality and Phu Kum Kao locality | Dental remains | A somphospondylian sauropod; wear facet on crown apex shows difference from Phuwiangosaurus | |
| Vayuraptor | V. nongbualamphuensis | Phu Wat Site A1 Locality, Nong Sang, Nong Bua Lamphu province. | Partial skeleton including pectoral, limb and pelvic elements | A megaraptoran theropod | |

- Sauropoda indet. 1 and 2

==== Lizards ====
Lizards reported from the Sao Khua Formation
| Genus | Species | Presence | Material | Notes | Images |
|---|---|---|---|---|---|
| Anguimorpha indet. | | Phu Phok (SK1), Sakhon Nakhorn Province. | Fossilized eggs containing embryos. | Eggs originally thought to be of theropods like Epidendrosaurus. | |

==== Pseudosuchians ====
Pseudosuchians reported from the Sao Khua Formation
| Genus | Species | Presence | Material | Notes | Images |
|---|---|---|---|---|---|
| Goniopholis | G. phuwiangensis | Phu Wiang district. | A dentary. | Reassigned to Sunosuchus. | |
| Siamosuchus | S. phuphokensis | Phu Phok, Kok Prasil Sub-district, Phu Phan district, Sakon Nakhon province. | A partly articulated skeleton (PPC-1). | A goniopholidid neosuchian | |
| Sunosuchus | S. phuwiangensis | Phu Wiang district. | A dentary. | A gobionopholid neosuchian; originally reported as Goniopholis phuwiangensis. | |
| Theriosuchus | T. grandinaris | Phu Phok, Kok Prasil Sub-district, Phu Phan district, Sakon Nakhon province. | "PPC-2, a nearly complete rostrum and dentary". | A atoposaurid neosuchian | |
| Varanosuchus | V. sakonnakhonensis | Phu Sung locality near Mueang Sakon Nakhon district, Sakon Nakhon province. | A nearly complete skull and skeleton (SM-2021-1-97/101), a nearly complete skull (SM-2023-1-16), and a partial skull table (SM-2023-1-17). | A atoposaurid neosuchian | |

==== Pterosaurs ====
Pterosaurs reported from the Sao Khua Formation
| Genus | Species | Presence | Material | Notes | Images |
|---|---|---|---|---|---|
| Anhangueridae Indet. | Indeterminate | Phu Phok, Sakon Nakhon province. | An isolated tooth crown (SMP25). | Most comparable to anhanguerid teeth from the Cambridge Greensand and Kem Kem beds. | |

==== Turtles ====
Turtles reported from the Sao Khua Formation
| Genus | Species | Presence | Material | Notes | Images |
|---|---|---|---|---|---|
| Isanemys | I. srisuki | Kalasin, Khon Kaen and Sakon Nakhon provinces. | Over 20 shells & additional isolated shell plates. | A adocid turtle | |
| Kizylkumemys | K. sp. | Khon Kaen, Kalasin and Nong Bua Lamphu provinces. | Abundant but very fragmentary shell plates. | A carettochelyid turtle | |
| Protoshachemys | P. rubra | Phu Din Daeng, Nakhon Phanom province. | Shell material. | A adocid turtle | |

=== Fish ===
==== Bony fish ====
Bony fish reported from the Sao Khua Formation
| Genus | Species | Presence | Material | Notes | Images |
|---|---|---|---|---|---|
| Siamamia | S. naga | Phu Phok. | | A sinamiid fish | |

==== Cartilaginous fish ====
Cartilaginous fish reported from the Sao Khua Formation
| Genus | Species | Presence | Material | Notes | Images |
|---|---|---|---|---|---|
| Heteroptychodus | H. steinmanni | | Over 130 fragmentary teeth. | A hybodont shark | |
| Hybodontiformes Indet. | Incertae sedis | | 2 dermal denticles and a cephalic spines. | A hybodont shark | |
| Hybodus | "H." sp. A | | 18 fragmentary crowns. | A hybodontid hybodont | |
| Hybodus | H. sp. B | | Over 170 incomplete teeth. | A hybodontid hybodont | |
| Isanodus | I. paladeji | Phu Phan Thong, Nong Bua Lamphu province. | 185 incomplete teeth. | A lonchidiid hybodont | |
| Lonchidion | L. khoratensis | Phu Phan Thong, Nong Bua Lamphu province. | 25 teeth. | A lonchidiid hybodont | |
| Mukdahanodus | M. trisivakulii | Nong Sung district, Mukdahan province. | 11 isolated crowns. | A hybodont shark | |
| Parvodus | P. sp. | | 19 teeth. | A lonchidiid hybodont | |
| Ganopristidae Indet. | Indeterminate | Base of Phu Kum Khao hill in Sahatsakhan, Kalasin province. | A tip of rostral denticle (SM2012-1-021). | A ganopristid sawskate. The denticle has a single barb similar to Onchopristis, Onchosaurus, and Pucapristis, but is distinguished from all other genera by having a row of enameloid "droplets" on each side. It is one of the earliest sclerorhynchoids, along with Celtipristis and Onchopristis which also appeared in the Barremian. | |

=== Invertebrates ===
==== Bivalves ====
Bivalves reported from the Sao Khua Formation
| Genus | Species | Presence | Material | Notes | Images |
|---|---|---|---|---|---|
| Pseudohyria | P. (Matsumotoina) somanai | South of Phu Noi, Khon Kaen province. | | | |

== See also ==
- List of dinosaur-bearing rock formations
