= Protoxinjiangchelys =

Protoxinjiangchelys Temporal range: Early-Late Jurassic, 180–155.7 Ma

Scientific classification
- Kingdom: Animalia
- Phylum: Chordata
- Class: Reptilia
- Clade: Pantestudines
- Clade: Testudinata
- Family: †Xinjiangchelyidae
- Genus: †Protoxinjiangchelys; Tong et al., 2012
- Species: †P. salis

Binomial name
- †Protoxinjiangchelys salis Tong et al., 2012

Synonyms
- Chengyuchelys cf. zigongensis Ye, 1994

Extinct genus of turtles

Protoxinjiangchelys is an extinct genus of xinjiangchelyid turtle known from the Early to Late Jurassic of China (Xintiangou Formation and possibly also the Shaximiao Formation). It is known from the single species P. salis, which was named and described in 2012. It contains only the holotype, ZDM 3009, which consists of a complete shell with an articulated carapace and a complete plastron and possibly another, older specimen.
