= Phunoichelys =

Phunoichelys Temporal range: Late Jurassic

Scientific classification
- Kingdom: Animalia
- Phylum: Chordata
- Class: Reptilia
- Clade: Pantestudines
- Clade: Testudinata
- Family: †Xinjiangchelyidae
- Genus: †Phunoichelys; Tong et al., 2015

Type species
- Phunoichelys thirakhupti

Extinct genus of turtles

Phunoichelys is an extinct genus of xinjiangchelyid turtle that inhabited Thailand during the Jurassic period and is known from a single species, P. thirakhupti.
