= Qiketai Formation =

Geologic formation in Xinjiang, China

- Stratigraphic range: Callovian,164.6 Ma
- Type: Geological formation
- Underlies: Unnamed formation equivalent to the Qigu Formation
- Overlies: Sanjianfang Formation

Lithology
- Primary: Sandstone
- Other: Tuffite

Location
- Region: Xinjiang
- Country: China
- Extent: Turpan-Hami Basin

Type section
- Named for: Qiketai

The Qiketai Formation is a geological formation in Xinjiang, China. It is found within the Turpan-Hami Basin. It is roughly equivalent in age to the nearby Toutunhe Formation and Wucaiwan Formation of the Southern and Northern Junggar Basin, respectively. Tuffites within the unit have been dated to the Callovian stage of the Jurassic approximately 164.6 ± 1.4 ma. The dinosaur Xinjiangtitan is known from the formation.

== Fossil content ==
Sauropods of the Qiketai Formation
Taxa	Species	Material	Location	Notes	Images
Xinjiangtitan	X. shanshanesis	Partial skeletons		A Mamenchisaurid Sauropod	
