= Therangospodus =

Trace fossil classification
- Kingdom: Animalia
- Phylum: Chordata
- Class: Reptilia
- Clade: Dinosauria
- Clade: Saurischia
- Clade: Theropoda
- Ichnogenus: †Therangospodus

Dinosaur footprint

Therangospodus is an ichnogenus of dinosaur footprint.

== See also ==
- List of dinosaur ichnogenera
