= Toutunhe Formation =

Geologic formation in China

- Stratigraphic range: Oxfordian-Kimmeridgian, 161–153 Ma
- Type: Geological formation
- Underlies: Qigu Formation
- Overlies: Xishanyao Formation
- Thickness: Around 400 metres

Lithology
- Primary: Mudstone, Sandstone

Location
- Region: Xinjiang
- Country: China
- Extent: Southern Junggar Basin

The Toutunhe Formation is a Late Jurassic geological formation in China, specifically dating to the Oxfordian and Kimmeridgian stages. Dinosaur remains diagnostic to the genus level are among the fossils that have been recovered from the formation. The lower portion of the formation consists of grey to reddish mudstone with medium to coarse grained cross bedded sandstone, while the upper portion consists primarily of brown-red-purple mudstone, interbedded with fine to medium grained laminated sandstone.

== Paleofauna ==
Tianchisaurus nedegoapeferima - "Partial skeleton."

== See also ==
- List of dinosaur-bearing rock formations
  - List of stratigraphic units with few dinosaur genera
