= Qigu Formation =

Geological formation in Xinjiang, China

- Stratigraphic range: Oxfordian-Early Kimmeridgian, 160.8–155.3 Ma
- Type: Geological formation
- Underlies: Kalaza Formation
- Overlies: Toutunhe Formation (Junggar) Qiketai Formation (equivalent unit in the Turpan Basin)
- Thickness: Over 520 m (1,710 ft)

Lithology
- Primary: Siltstone, sandstone

Location
- Coordinates: 43.6°N 87.3°E
- Approximate paleocoordinates: 42.9°N 97.5°E
- Region: Xinjiang
- Country: China
- Extent: Southern Junggar Basin (blue); Turpan Basin (disputed) (cyan)
- Qigu Formation (China) Qigu Formation (Dzungaria)

The Qigu Formation is a Late Jurassic (Oxfordian) geologic formation in the Southern Junggar Basin in China. Indeterminate dinosaur remains are among the fossils that have been recovered from the formation, including the stegosaur remains, theropod teeth and a fibula, and a eusauropod tooth. Xinjiangtitan was erroneously thought to be from this formation, but it is actually from the older Qiketai Formation, which is in a different basin. The term "Qigu Formation" is also used to sediments of equivalent age in the Turpan Basin, but this might better be treated as a separate formation. It is laterally equivalent to the Shishugou Formation.

== Fossil content ==
The mass accumulation of Jurassic freshwater turtle fossils belonging to the genus Annemys, discovered in 2009 at a site nicknamed "Mesa Chelonia" in Shanshan County, Xinjiang is thought to likely belong to the Qigu Formation, though it belongs to the strata of the Turpan Basin. Remains of indeterminate dinosaurs, including ankylosaurs, metriacanthosaurids, and dromaeosaurids are known from the formation.

The remains of indeterminate rhamphorhynchid pterosaurs have been recovered from the formation. Among others, the following fossils have been found in the formation:

Crocodyliformes of the Qigu Formation
Taxa	Species	Material	Location	Notes	Images
Nominosuchus	Indeterminate		Liuhuanggou bonebed		
Sunosuchus	Indeterminate				
Theriosuchus	Indeterminate				

Mammaliamorphs of the Qigu Formation
Taxa	Species	Material	Location	Notes	Images
Nanolestes	N. mackennai		Liuhuanggou bonebed		
Tegotherium	Indeterminate				
Dsungarodon	D. zuoi			Docodontan	
Sineleutherus	S. uyguricus				
Eutriconodonta	Indeterminate				

Stegosaur of the Qigu Formation
Taxa	Species	Material	Location	Notes	Images
"Angustungui"	"A. qiketaiensis"	Partial skeletons		A stegosaurid; nomen nudum	

== See also ==
- List of dinosaur-bearing rock formations
- List of pterosaur-bearing stratigraphic units
