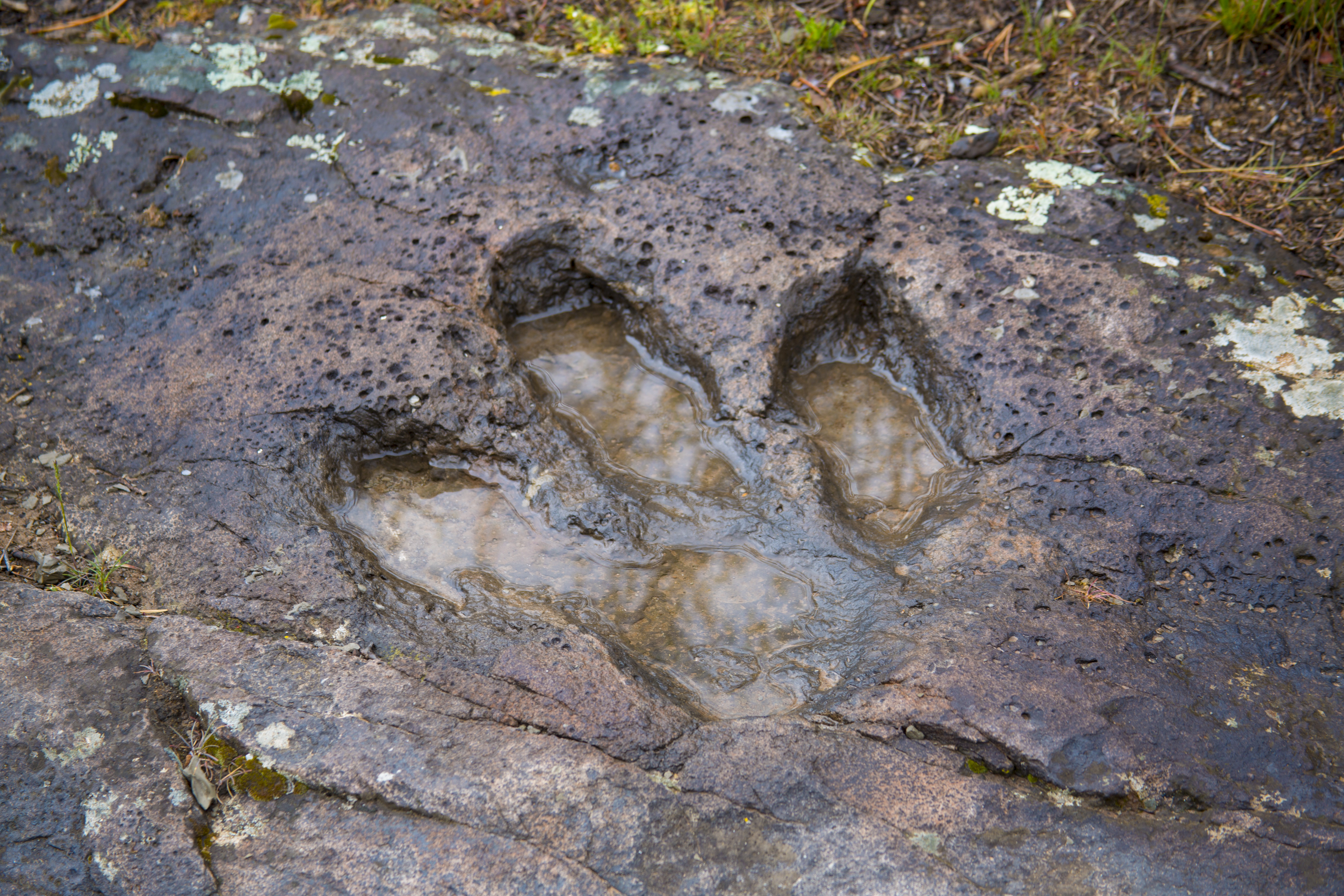
- Fossil track assigned to Megalosauripus

Trace fossil classification
- Ichnofamily: Eubrontidae
- Ichnogenus: Megalosauripus; Lessertisseur, 1955

Ichnospecies
- Megalosauripus uzbekistanicus; Megalosauripus krimholzi; Megalosauripus maximus

= Megalosauripus =

Megalosauripus Temporal range: 201.6–125.45 Ma Jurassic to Cretaceous

Dinosaur trace fossil

Megalosauripus is an ichnogenus that has been attributed to dinosaurs. The first ever appearance of this ichnospecies is 201 - 197 million years ago during the Early Jurassic period. The last recorded appearance was 156 - 151 million years ago during the Jurassic period.

Shape the footprint

The confusing history of dinosaur footprints means many kinds of theropod tracks have been put into the Megalosauripus ichnogenus, even though they were an entirely different ichnospecies. This makes it hard to piece together what exactly is Megalosauripus, and what is not. Here is a general summary of what paleontologists use to identify a Megalosaripus footprint. These footprints typically have three toes and a digitigrade stance. This is also known as a theropod. Sometimes their toes of this type are skinny; in other examples, they show pads. They are all typically between twenty centimeters to seventy-two centimeters long. They all have long heels and have varying types of locomotion including wide and short gates.

Life While Alive

Most of the creatures with the iconologies Megalosauripus lived in a terrestrial environment. Their feet enabled them to move fast, be agile and catch their prey. Their prey mostly was of other animals, as they were carnivores. To reproduce they laid eggs of their young.

Name Establishment and Changes

- Megalosauripus was first named by Lessertissuer in 1955.
- Lessertisseur named it Megalosaruipus with an I to try to make a theme of naming dinosaur tracks with I's like the Tyrannosauripus. It would take a while before other scientists would start to use this name.
- It was synonymized subjectively with Bueckeburg Chnus by Haubold in 1971; it was later considered a nomen nudum by Lockley et al. 1996 because no species name or type specimen was designated.
- Formerly known as Bueckeburgichnus

Name of the Footprint

The name Megalosauripus means large saurian footprints and derives historically from an archaic and generalized concept of megalosaurid dinosaurs. The name may coincidentally, but by no means certainly, imply a relationship to dinosaurs like Megalosaurus and its relatives.

== See also ==
- List of dinosaur ichnogenera
- Ichnology
