= Huashanosaurus =

Huashanosaurus Temporal range: Early–?Middle Jurassic

Scientific classification
- Kingdom: Animalia
- Phylum: Chordata
- Class: Reptilia
- Clade: Dinosauria
- Clade: Saurischia
- Clade: †Sauropodomorpha
- Clade: †Sauropoda
- Clade: †Eusauropoda
- Genus: †Huashanosaurus; Mo et al., 2025
- Species: †H. qini

Binomial name
- †Huashanosaurus qini Mo et al., 2025

Genus of sauropod dinosaurs

External image
- Reconstructed skeleton, illustrating the fragmentary preserved material (dark grey).

Huashanosaurus (meaning "Huashan Mountain lizard") is an extinct genus of eusauropod sauropod dinosaurs known from the Early–Middle Jurassic Wangmen Formation of China. The genus contains a single species, Huashanosaurus qini, known from a fragmentary partial skeleton.

== Discovery and naming ==
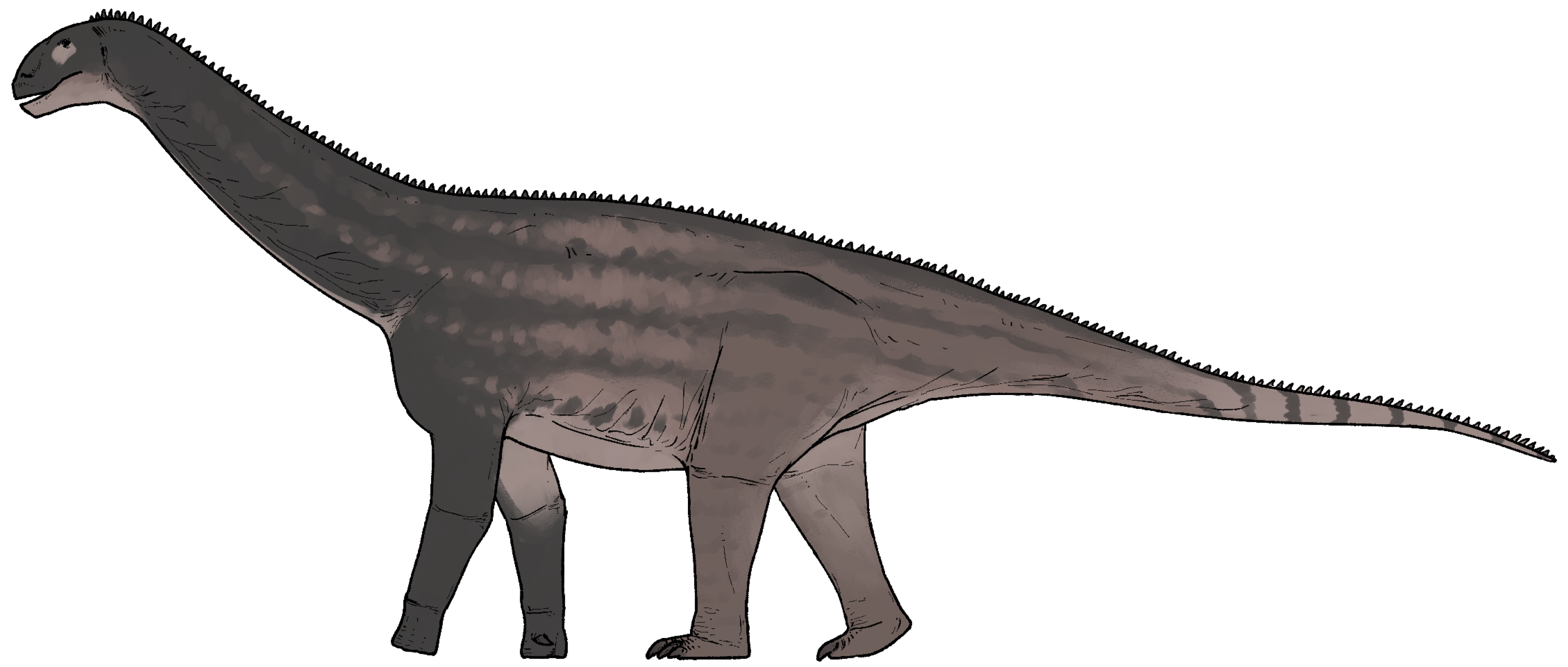
Speculative life restoration

The fossil material referred to Huashanosaurus was found in outcrops of the Wangmen Formation in the Huqiu Quarry near Dongshi Village in Guangxi Zhuang Autonomous Region of southern China. Fragmentary and disarticulated fossil material was first found in this area in 2002 by Jian Qin, a local teacher, while searching for stones near the river. Subsequent excavations were conducted in 2017 by the Natural History Museum of Guangxi (NHMG) and the Cultural Relics Administration of Ningming County (CRAN), during which fish scales and teeth, plesiosaur teeth, and additional fragmentary dinosaur remains were collected. While the specimens collected in 2002 and 2017 are accessioned as separate specimens in different institutions—the holotype, NHMG 034093, and paratype, CRAN 0001—they likely belong to the same individual based on their similar size and form. The holotype comprises one dorsal vertebral centrum, a partial dorsal rib, the end of a left humerus and top part of a left ulna, a manual phalanx (finger bone), part of the left ilium, the end of a femur and fibula, and part of a fifth metatarsal and pedal ungual (foot claw). The paratype includes three anterior (toward the front) caudal vertebrae and a neural spine, a middle caudal vertebra, and a pedal phalanx.

In 2025, Mo and colleagues described Huashanosaurus qini as a new genus and species of eusauropod dinosaurs based on these fossil remains. The generic name, Huashanosaurus, combines a reference to Huashan Mountain, a UNESCO World Heritage Site known for the Zuojiang Huashan Rock Art, with the Ancient Greek σαῦρος (sauros), meaning "lizard". The specific name, qini, honors Jian Qin, the discoverer of the specimen.

Huashanosaurus is the second eusauropod to be named from the Guangxi region, after the mamenchisaurid Jingiella, known from the Dongxing Formation, in 2024.

== Classification ==
To test the relationships and affinities of Huashanosaurus, Mo and colleagues (2025) scored it in the phylogenetic dataset of Carballido et al. (2017), incorporating several subsequent revisions by Tan et al. (2019), Tan et al. (2020), and Ma et al. (2021). This analysis recovered Huashanosaurus in an early-diverging position within the Eusauropoda, diverging after Shunosaurus and Patagosaurus, in an unresolved polytomy with Mamenchisaurus and two species of Omeisaurus (O. puxiani and O. tianfuensis). The earlier iterations of this analysis recovered Mamenchisaurus and Omeisaurus spp. in a monophyletic clade. An abbreviated version of these results is displayed in the cladogram below:

- Eusauropoda
  - Shunosaurus
  - - Patagosaurus
    - - Huashanosaurus
      - Mamenchisaurus
      - Omeisaurus puxiani
      - Omeisaurus tianfuensis
      - - Neosauropoda

== Paleoenvironment ==
The Wangmen Formation has historically been recognized as dating to the earliest Early Jurassic; the formation has yielded fossils of the plant Otozamites, as well as fossil spores (Lycopodiumsporites) and conifer pollen (Classopollis). These have been interpreted as indicative of an Early Jurassic age for the formation. However, in their description of Huashanosaurus, Mo and colleagues speculated that this formation ranged into the Middle Jurassic, as this is when eusauropods are known to have diversified.
