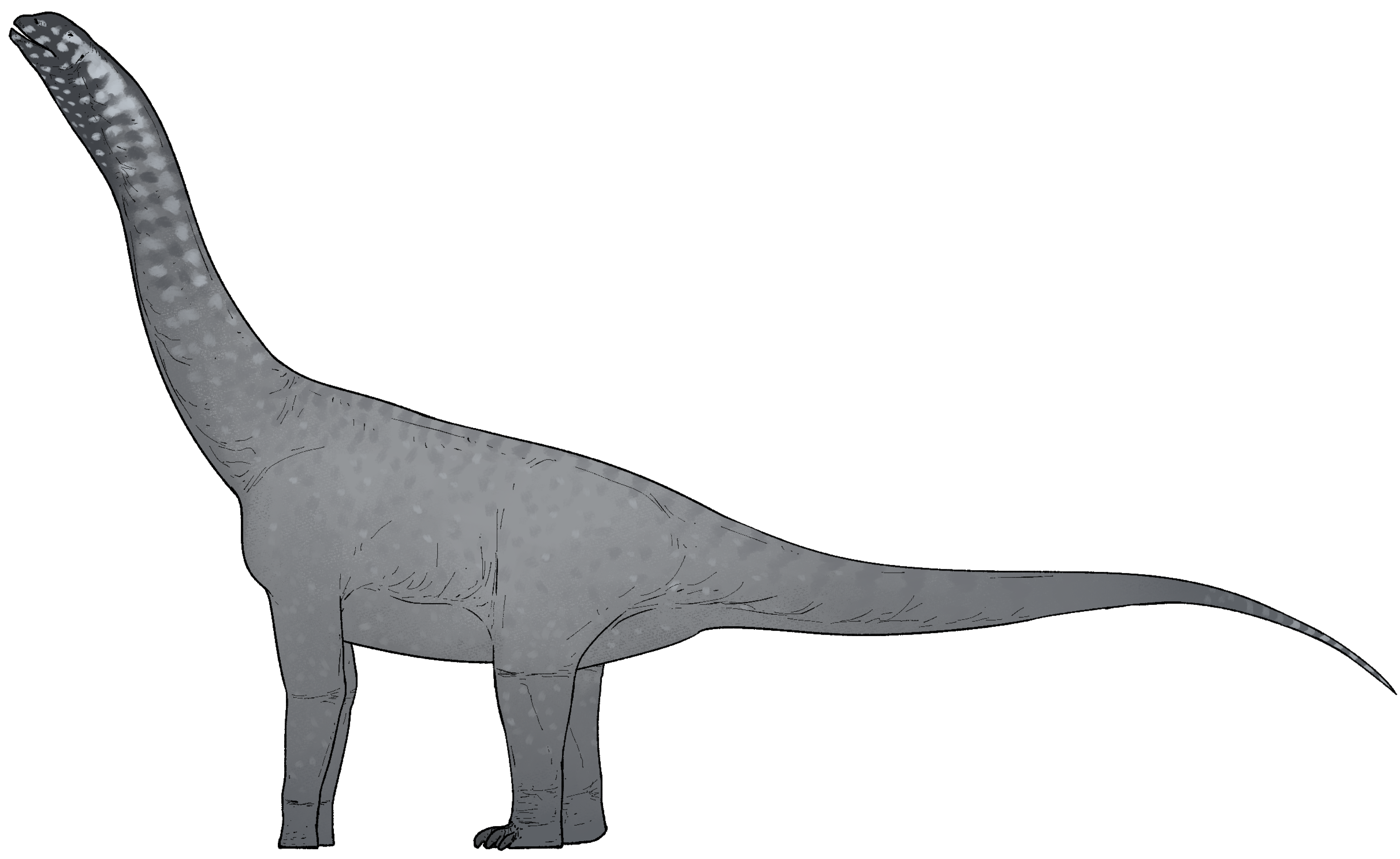
- Life restoration

Scientific classification
- Kingdom: Animalia
- Phylum: Chordata
- Class: Reptilia
- Clade: Dinosauria
- Clade: Saurischia
- Clade: †Sauropodomorpha
- Clade: †Sauropoda
- Clade: †Eusauropoda
- Genus: †Jinchuanloong; Li et al., 2025
- Species: †J. niedu

Binomial name
- †Jinchuanloong niedu Li et al., 2025

= Jinchuanloong =

Jinchuanloong Temporal range: Middle Jurassic, late Bathonian

Genus of sauropod dinosaurs

Jinchuanloong (meaning "Jinchuan dragon") is an extinct genus of eusauropod sauropod dinosaurs from the Middle Jurassic Xinhe Formation of China. The genus contains a single species, Jinchuanloong niedu, known from a partial skeleton including a nearly complete skull.

== Discovery and naming ==
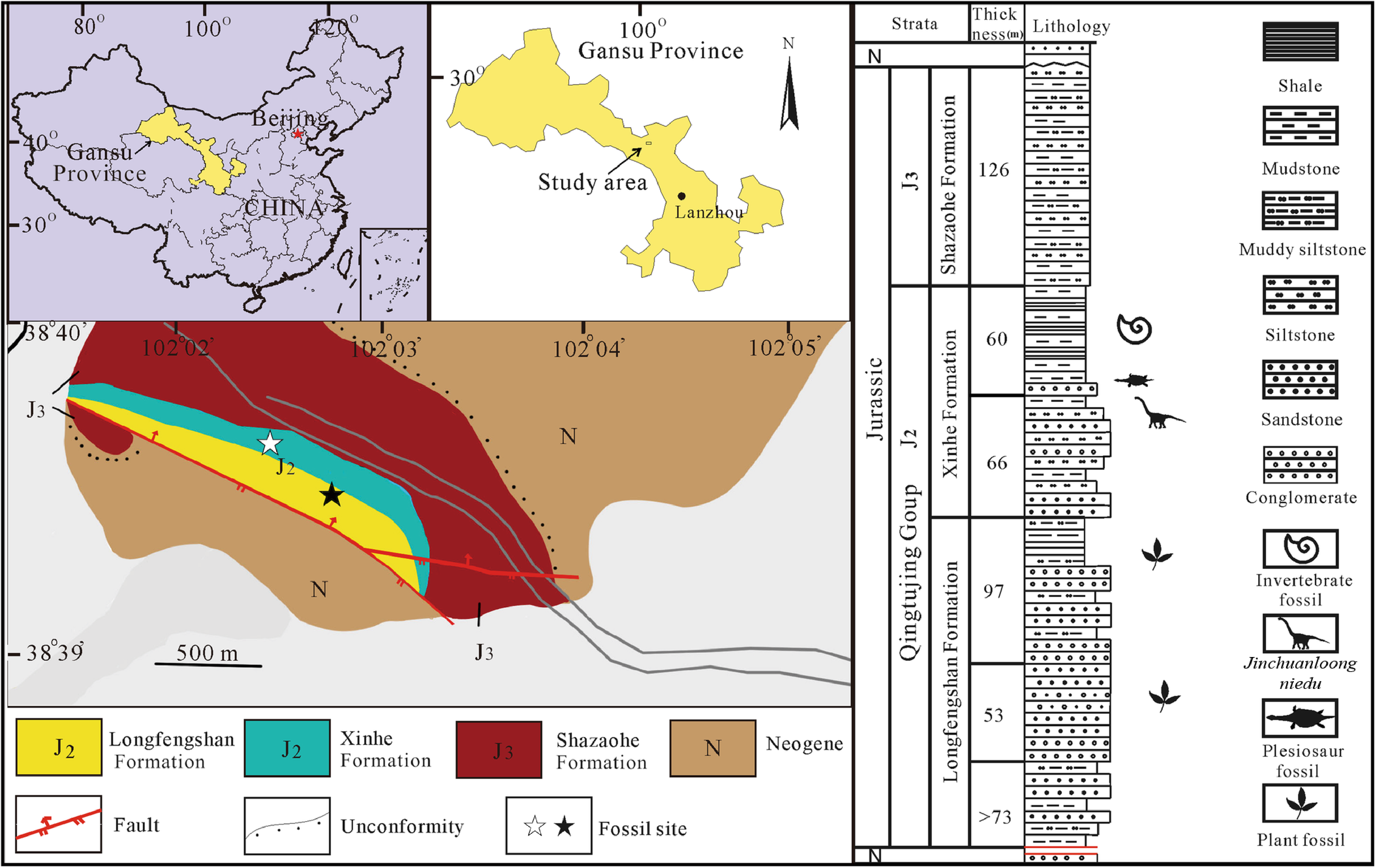
Jinchuanlong type locality (white star)

The Jinchuanloong holotype specimen, JCMF 0132, was discovered as the result of fieldwork conducted in 2017 by Dr. Li Daqing in outcrops of the Xinhe Formation in the Jinchuan District, of Gansu Province in northwest China. The specimen consists of a well-preserved, nearly complete skull and mandible articulated with the first five cervical vertebrae (including the atlas-axis complex) and 29 of the posteriormost (toward the end) caudal vertebrae, some of which are preserved with associated haemal arches. In the approximately 5-metre (16 ft) gap between the neck and tail, there are preserved impressions of the pelvic girdle and sacral vertebrae. The first three preserved caudals preserve only the neural spine. The remaining vertebrae are all articulated, exposed in right lateral view. Unfortunately, the caudal vertebrae were not yet collected at the time of their description in 2025, so protective fences were installed around them in the outcrop they are embedded in.

In 2025, Li et al. described Jinchuanloong niedu as a new genus and species of eusauropod dinosaurs based on these fossil remains. The generic name, Jinchuanloong, combines a reference to the type locality in Jinchuan District with the Mandarin Chinese word long, meaning "dragon". The specific name, niedu, combines the Mandarin words nie, meaning "nickel" and du, meaning "city", in reference to Jinchuan's well-known nickel resources.

== Description ==
The holotype skull of Jinchuanloong measures 31 centimetres (12 in) long and 12.5 centimetres (4.9 in) tall. It generally resembles the skulls of related taxa such as Mamenchisaurus youngi. In comparison to this taxon and Shunosaurus, the skull of Jinchuanloong appears to have a broader snout in dorsal view, though this may be the result of taphonomic deformation.

Jinchuanloong is known only from anteriormost (toward the front) and posteriormost (toward the back) parts of the skeleton, specifically the skull, the beginning of the neck, and the end of the tail. Based on the relative location of these preserved elements, Jinchuanloong is estimated to be 10 metres (33 ft) long. There is no fusion between the neural arch and neural spine or the cervical and first preserved caudal vertebrae, which implies the holotype belongs to an individual that was not skeletally mature. Furthermore, the intercentrum and neurapophyses of the atlas are unfused, and the pineal foramen is large, both raising the possibility that the holotype is a juvenile.

== Classification ==
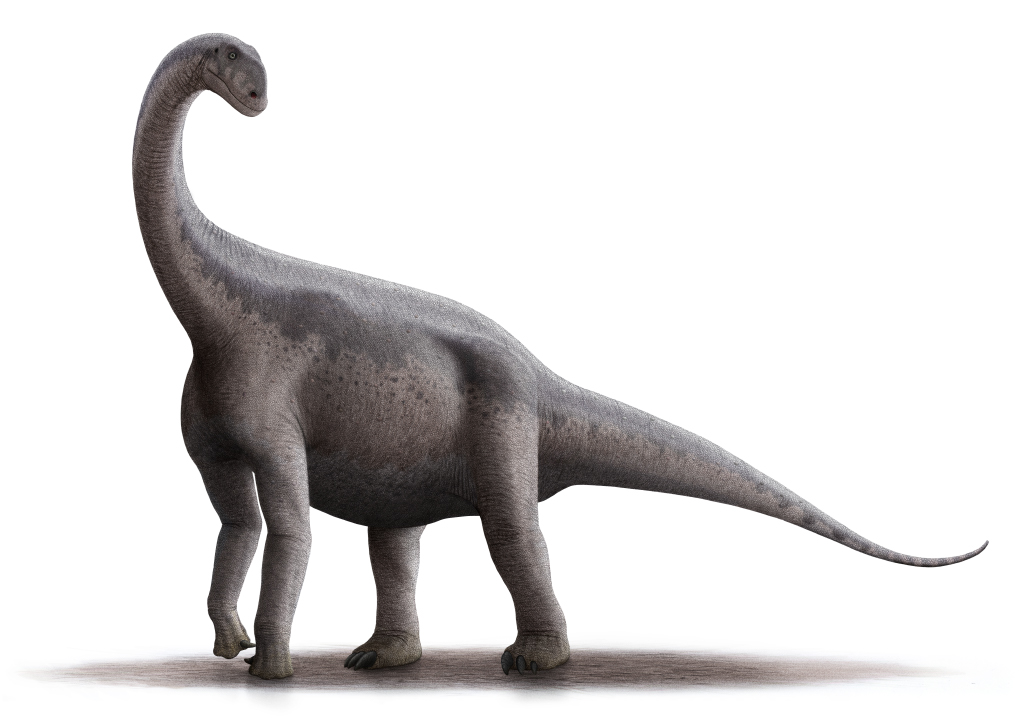
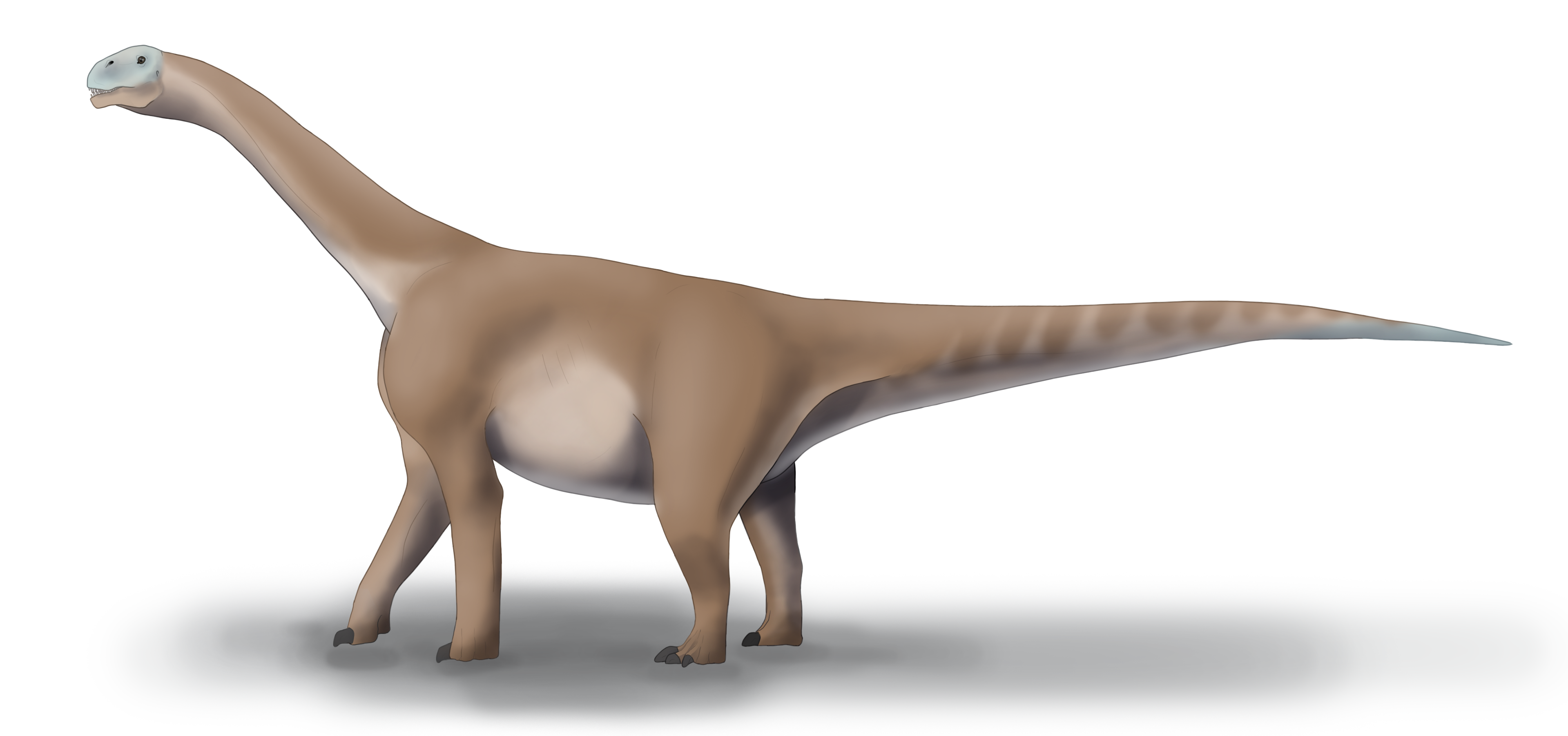
Speculative life restorations of the more basal Jobaria (top) and a more derived turiasaur, Moabosaurus (bottom)

In their phylogenetic analysis, Li et al. (2025) recovered Jinchuanloong as a basal member of the sauropod clade Eusauropoda, outside of Neosauropoda (the group containing diplodocoids and macronarians). Their analysis placed it in a position diverging after a roughly coeval clade comprising Jobaria from Niger and Lapparentosaurus from Madagascar, but before the Turiasauria. These results are displayed in the cladogram below:

- Eusauropoda
  - Shunosaurus
  - - Omeisaurus
    - - Mamenchisauridae
      - - - Jobaria
          - Lapparentosaurus
        - - Jinchuanloong
          - - Turiasauria
            - Neosauropoda
              - Diplodocoidea
              - Macronaria

== Paleoenvironment ==
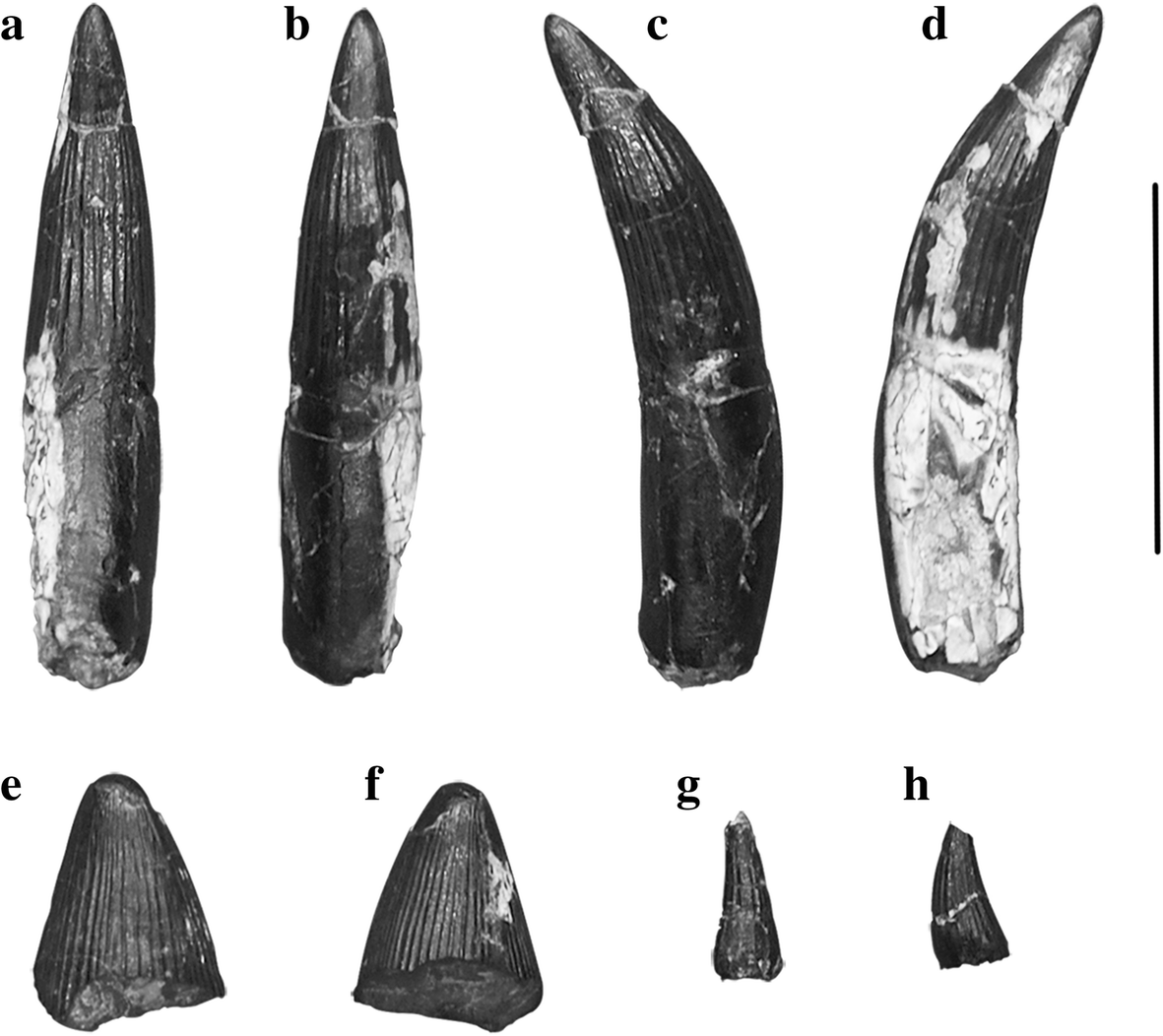
Plesiosaur teeth from the upper Xinhe Formation

Jinchuanloong was collected from the lower outcrops of the Xinhe Formation, a member of the Qingtujing Group, which dates to the late Bathonian age of the Middle Jurassic. The lower section of the formation is made up of yellow conglomerates, sandstone, and siltstone, which are interbedded with silty mudstone. Fossil plants and pollen are also preserved in the lower part. The upper section has yielded turtle remains and teeth of an indeterminate plesiosaur, in what is assumed to be a freshwater depositional environment.
