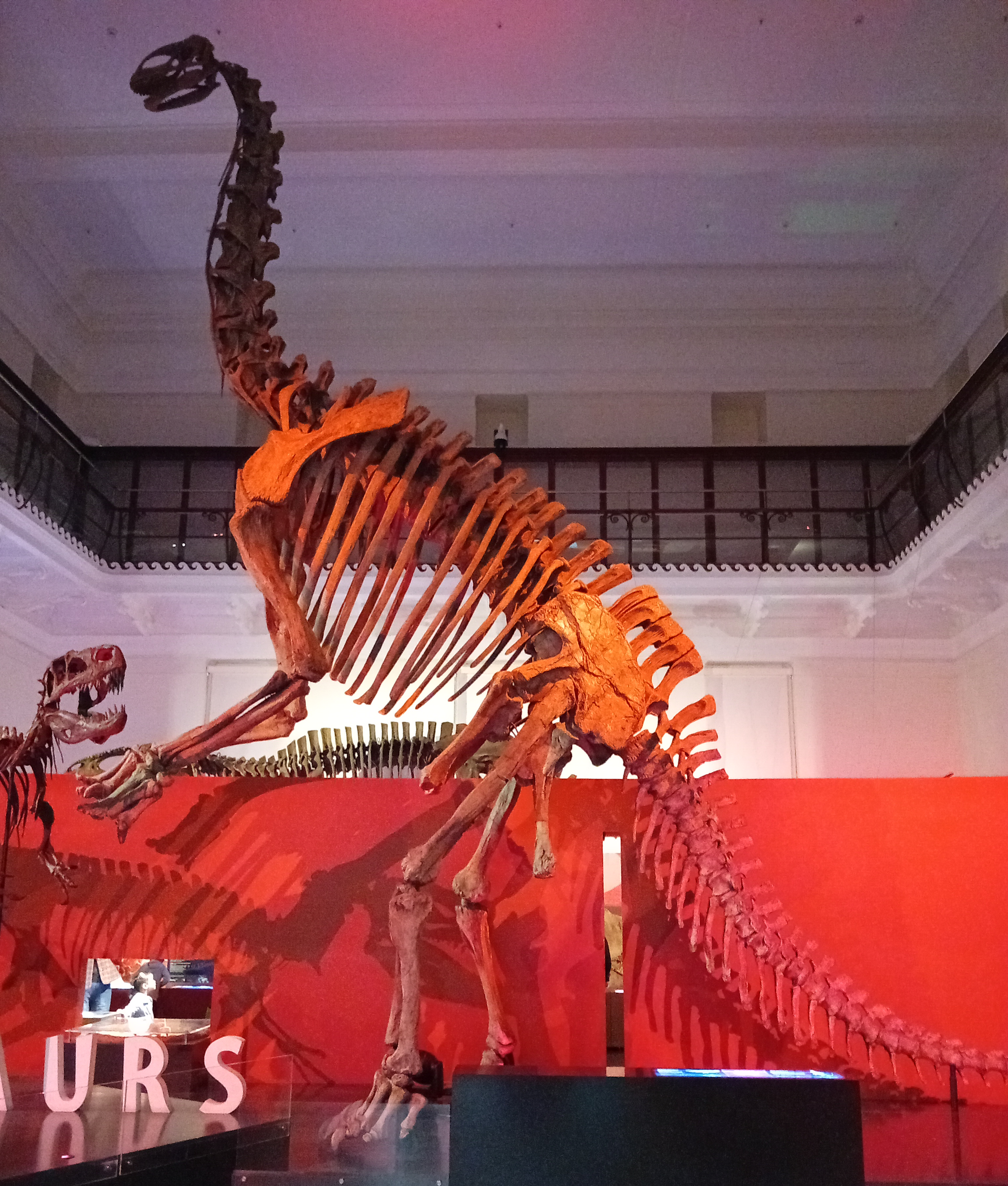
- Cast mounted in rearing pose, Australian Museum

Scientific classification
- Kingdom: Animalia
- Phylum: Chordata
- Class: Reptilia
- Clade: Dinosauria
- Clade: Saurischia
- Clade: †Sauropodomorpha
- Clade: †Sauropoda
- Clade: †Eusauropoda
- Genus: †Jobaria; Sereno et al., 1999

Type species
- †Jobaria tiguidensis Sereno et al., 1999

= Jobaria =

Jobaria Temporal range: Middle Jurassic, 167–161 Ma

Extinct genus of dinosaurs

Jobaria is a genus of sauropod dinosaur that lived in what is now Niger during the middle Jurassic Period, between 164 and 161 million years ago. Jobaria is currently the only known valid sauropod from the Tiouraren, where it was discovered in 1997.

== Discovery ==
Discovered in the fall of 1997, during a four-month expedition to the Sahara desert led by paleontologist Dr. Paul Sereno, it was found in a mass-death site in the Tiourarén Formation of Niger. With over 95% of its skeleton preserved it is among the most complete sauropods ever found.

The genus is named after a local mythical giant beast, Jobar, whose bones some Tuaregs believed the fossils to be. The specific name tiguidensis comes from the cliff of Tiguidi, the site of discovery.

The sediments in which it was found were originally thought to represent the Hauterivian to Barremian stages of the early Cretaceous Period, dating Jobaria to approximately 132 million years ago. However, re-interpretation of the sediments showed that they are more likely from the Bathonian to Oxfordian stages of the middle Jurassic in age, between 167 and 161 million years ago.

== Description ==
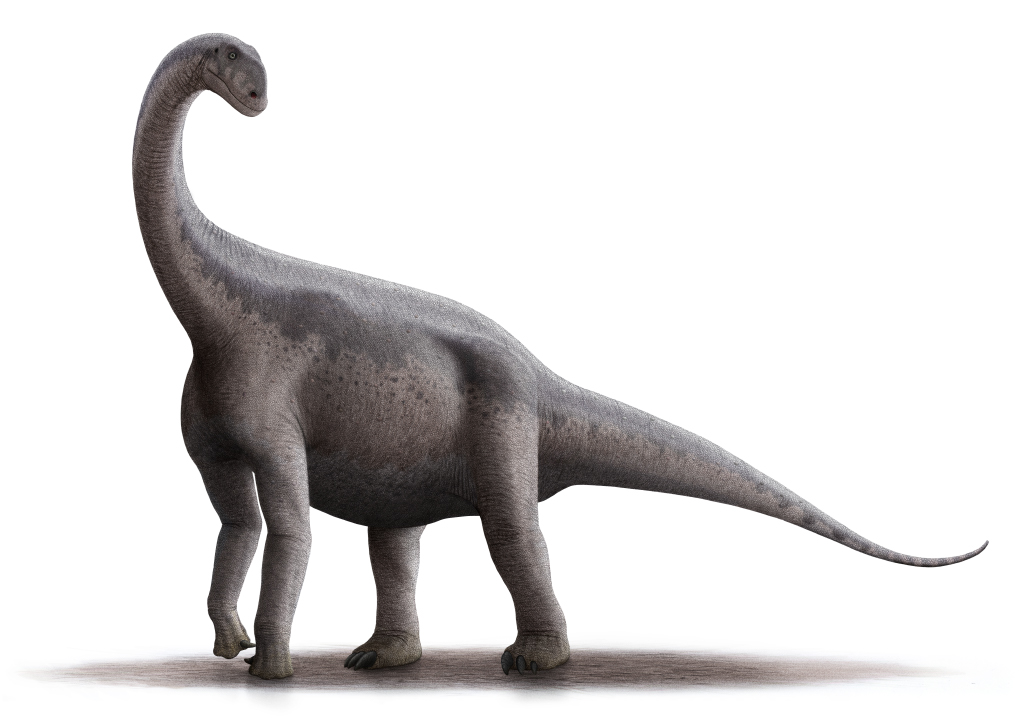
Life restoration

Size of Jobaria compared to a human

Jobaria was a primitive sauropod, about 18.2 metres (60 ft) long and estimated to weigh about 22.4 tonnes (24.7 short tons). In 2016 Gregory S. Paul gave a lower estimation of 16 metres (52 ft) and 16 tonnes (18 short tons). Its backbone and tail were simple compared to the complex vertebrae and whiplash tail of the later North America sauropods Diplodocus and Apatosaurus.

It may also have been able to rear up on its hind legs as Paul Sereno concluded, after comparing the ratios of humerus and femur circumferences in Jobaria to extant elephants. The weight distribution of Jobaria indicates that it was supported by the rear limbs rather than the forelimbs (as in elephants) and is speculated that as elephants can rear up, then Jobaria would have been able to more easily.

== Classification ==
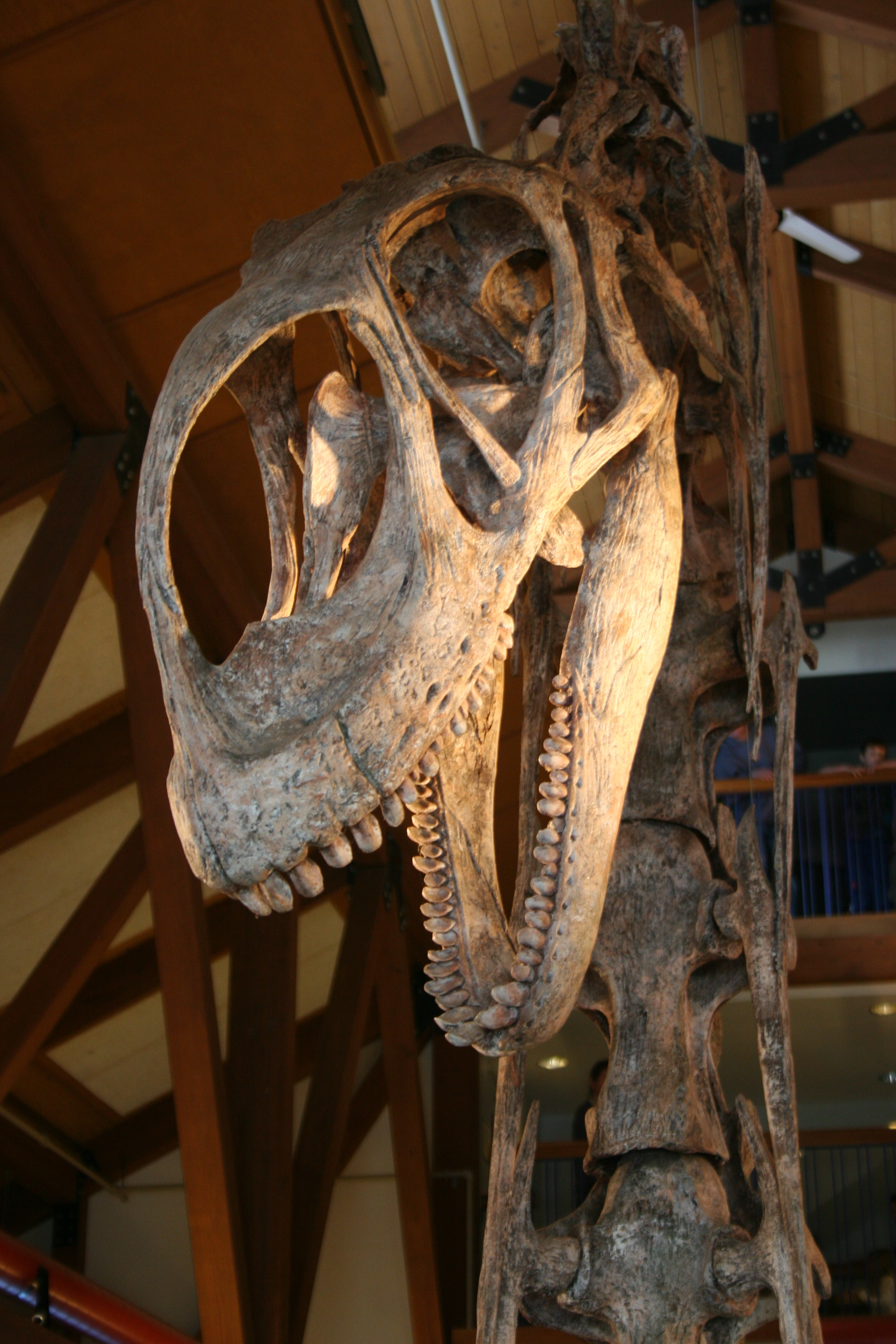
Head cast, Montshire Museum of Science

The phylogenetic relationships of Jobaria are uncertain; it has been interpreted either as a basal macronarian, or as a non-neosauropod eusauropod, basal to the neosauropod clade.

The following cladogram shows the position of Jobaria within the Eusauropoda.

- Eusauropoda
  - Shunosaurus
  - - Barapasaurus
    - - Patagosaurus
      - - Mamenchisauridae
          - Omeisaurus
          - Mamenchisaurus
        - - Cetiosaurus
          - - Jobaria
            - Neosauropoda
              - Haplocanthosaurus
              - Diplodocoidea
                - Rebbachisauridae
                  - Limaysaurus
                  - Nigersaurus
                - - Dicraeosauridae
                    - Amargasaurus
                    - Dicraeosaurus
                  - Diplodocidae
                    - Apatosaurus
                    - Brontosaurus
                    - - Barosaurus
                      - Diplodocus
              - Macronaria
                - Camarasaurus
                - Titanosauriformes
                  - Brachiosaurus
                  - - Phuwiangosaurus
                    - Titanosauria
                      - Malawisaurus
                      - - Rapetosaurus
                        - - Isisaurus
                          - - Opisthocoelicaudia
                            - Saltasaurus
