= Jobar (monster) =

Nigerian folklore creature

- Amateur depiction

Creature information
- Grouping: Mythical creature
- Folklore: Tuareg

Jobar is a monster from folklore of the Tuareg of Niger. It was described as a giant beast (in some accounts like a camel), and was as a boogeyman that would eat naughty children and those that strayed from the camp.

The dinosaur Jobaria was named after Jobar, as the bones of Jobaria eroding out of rocks were identified as belonging to Jobar. The rocks showed evidence of a flood, hence why there is a story of Jobars dying in a flood and a palaeontological theory Jobaria died in a flood.
