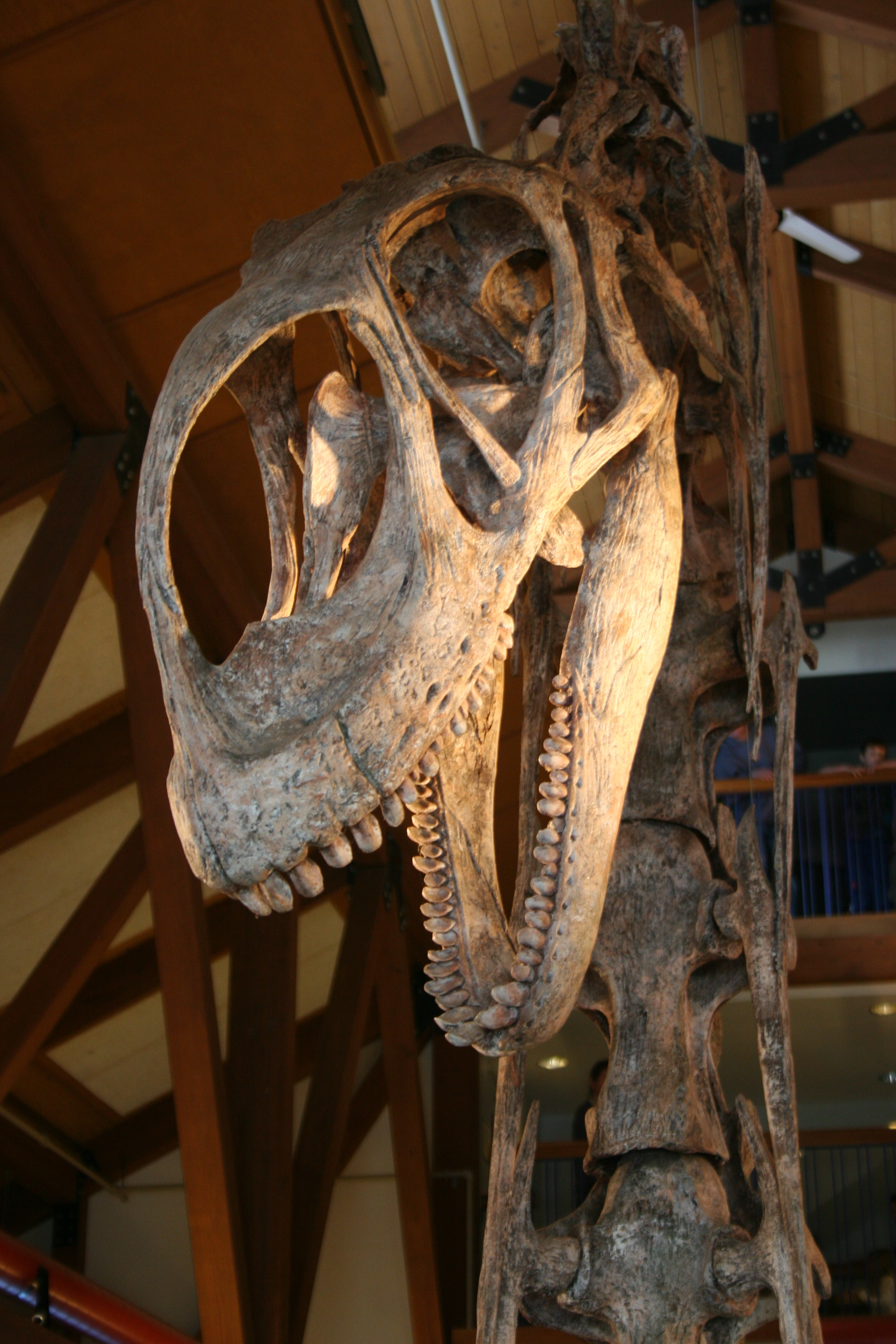
- Skull of Jobaria

Scientific classification
- Kingdom: Animalia
- Phylum: Chordata
- Class: Reptilia
- Clade: Dinosauria
- Clade: Saurischia
- Clade: †Sauropodomorpha
- Clade: †Sauropoda
- Clade: †Gravisauria
- Clade: †Eusauropoda; Upchurch, 1995

Subgroups
- †Cetiosauridae
- †Mamenchisauridae
- †Turiasauria
- †Neosauropoda
Uncertain affinity and basal genera
- †Algoasaurus?
- †Asiatosaurus?
- †Atlasaurus?
- †Bagualia
- †Barapasaurus?
- †Bellusaurus
- †Cetiosauriscus
- †Chebsaurus
- †Chondrosteosaurus?
- †Datousaurus
- †Ferganasaurus?
- †Huashanosaurus
- †Jinchuanloong
- †Jobaria
- †Klamelisaurus?
- †Kotasaurus?
- †Lapparentosaurus
- †Liubangosaurus?
- †Nebulasaurus
- †Ohmdenosaurus?
- †Qinlingosaurus?
- †Rhoetosaurus?
- †Shunosaurus
- †Spinophorosaurus?
- †Tharosaurus
- †Volkheimeria?
- †Yantaloong

= Eusauropoda =

Eusauropods Temporal range: Early Jurassic—Late Cretaceous, 184.5–66 Ma

Extinct clade of dinosaurs

Eusauropoda (meaning "true lizard foot") is a derived clade of sauropod dinosaurs. Eusauropods represent the node-based group that includes all descendant sauropods starting with the basal eusauropods of Shunosaurus, and possibly Barapasaurus, and Amygdalodon, but excluding Vulcanodon and Rhoetosaurus. The Eusauropoda was coined in 1995 by Paul Upchurch to create a monophyletic new taxonomic group that would include all sauropods, except for the vulcanodontids.

Eusauropods are herbivorous, quadrupedal, and have long necks. They have been found in South America, Europe, North America, Asia, Australia, and Africa. The temporal range of Eusauropoda ranges from the early Jurassic to the Latest Cretaceous periods. The most primitive forms of eusauropods are not well-known because the Vulcanodon cranial material is not available, and the distribution of some of these shared derived traits that distinguish Eusauropoda is still completely unclear. However the discovery of Tazoudasaurus, which does preserve cranial material, did help refine some of the characteristics.

== Description ==
Eusauropods are long-necked, strictly herbivorous, obligate quadrupeds. They have a highly specialized set of skeletal adaptions due to their large size, and are graviportal.

=== Teeth and mouth ===
Yates and Upchurch described eusauropod evolution as moving towards a "bulk-browsing mode of feeding". They describe the development of lateral plates on the alveolar margins of tooth-bearing bones. These plates can be used to strip foliage, the eusauropod's "U-shaped" jaws create a wide bite, and their loss of "fleshy cheeks" increased the gape. The crowns of eusauropod teeth also have "wrinkled enamel textures", but it is unclear what this meant for their feeding habits.

=== Head and neck ===
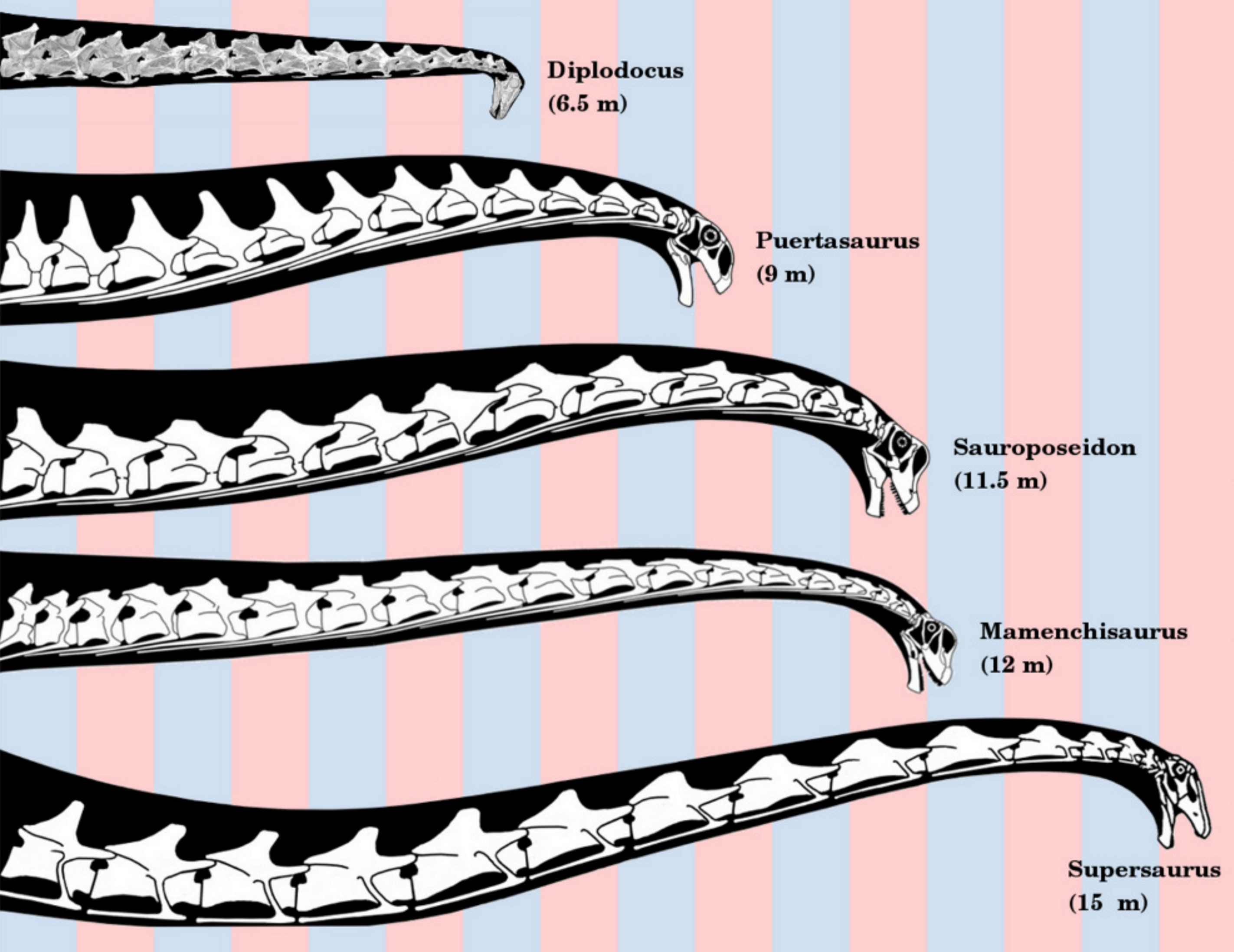
Reconstruction of selected sauropod necks, showing posture and length

The skull length of the basal eusauropod, Patagosaurus, is about 60 centimetres (24 in). One of the most basal eusauropods, Shunosaurus, has two characteristic features of the eusauropod elongated neck: the incorporation of the equivalent of the first dorsal vertebra into the cervical region of the spine, and the addition of two cervical vertebra in the middle of the cervical vertebrae.

Other synapomorphies of Eusauropoda includes a retracted position of the external nares. Unlike prosauropods and theropods, which have a snout with smooth, unprotruding alveolar and subnarial regions, eusauropods have snouts with "stepped anterior margins". Further distinguishing features of eusauropods include the absence of the contact between the squamosal and the quadratojugal, the absence of the anterior (front) process of the prefrontal, and a distally elongated anterior ramus of the quadratojugal. Separating the anteroventral process of the nasal from the posterolateral process of the premaxilla, eusauropods also have a long maxilla that forms the posteroventral margin of the external naris.

=== Feet and limbs ===
Eusauruopods are hypothesized to have had a semi-digitigrade foot posture, demonstrated by footprint evidence. This differs from theropods and prosauropods, which had a digitigrade pes (foot) where the heel and metatarsals were lifted off the ground. Eusauropods show asymmetry in their metatarsal shaft diameters where metatarsal I was broader than the others, suggesting that their weight was mostly assumed by their inner feet. According to Steven Salisbury and Jay Nair, basal eusauropods retained four pedal unguals (the toe bones which supported claws) but reduced their phalangeal count in their fourth digit to three. The metatarsus in eusauropods is less than a quarter of their tibial length, unlike sauropod outgroups that have long hindlimbs and metatarsus that are almost half of their tibial length.

== Distribution ==
Eusauropods are found on all major continents, with diplocodoids being widespread in the Northern Hemisphere, and titanosaurs being found in Southern Hemisphere. However, basal eusauropods that do not fall into either group are fairly well represented.

Early eusauropods such as Volkeimeria and Amygdalodon, and more derived eusauropods such as Patagosaurus have been found in South America. Volkeimeria is classified as a basal eusauropod, though in 2004 Paul Upchurch was suspicious of its placement, because of its "opisthoceolous cervical centra, the absence of a femoral anterior trochanter, and laterally projecting cnemial crest of the tibia", and instead thought it may be a generic sauropod.

African eusauropods may include Spinophorosaurus, from Niger, although that taxon may instead be closer to Vulcanodon and outside Eusauropoda. Also, Atlasaurus was found in Morocco, and Jobaria was found in Niger. However, both genera have been found as possible Macronarians, but Atlasaurus was found to be a turiasaurian, and Jobaria a eusauropod, by a phylogenetic analysis of Xing in 2012.

In Europe, the clade Turiasauria has been found in France, Spain, and possibly England, with multiple genera from the same locality in Spain. Cetiosaurus skeletons have also been found in England, along with the possibly eusauropod genera Cardiodon and Oplosaurus, known only from teeth.

The family Mamenchisauridae is found widespread throughout Asia. A majority of the genera are found in China, although a possible specimen of Mamenchisaurus has been found in Thailand. Also in China, the basal eusauropod Nebulasaurus taito was found to be a sister taxon to Spinophorosaurus, and more derived than Mamenchisauridae, but less derived than Patagosaurus, and the genus Shunosaurus is likely one of the most basal eusauropods. The genus Barapasaurus has been found in India, and may represent a cetiosaurid, a basal eusauropod, or a genus outside Eusauropoda.

== Paleobiology ==
The data around sauropod evolution, as Novas points out, is largely based on a few formations mostly in the Northern Hemisphere. However, other beds in places such as Tanzania, specifically the Canadon Asfalto and Canadon Calcereo formations, reveal a more diverse and widespread paleobiology of eusauropods in the Late Jurassic period.

== Classification ==
Cladogram of Eusauropoda after Gomez et al. (2024):

- Sauropoda
  - Antetonitrus
  - - Ingentia
    - Lessemsaurus
  - - Ledumahadi
    - Pulanesaura
    - - - Gongxianosaurus
        - Amygdalodon
        - NHMUK PVR 36834
      - - Archaeodontosaurus
        - Volkheimeria
        - Sanpasaurus
        - Vulcanodon
        - Tazoudasaurus
        - Eusauropoda
          - Shunosaurus
          - - Barapasaurus
            - - - Patagosaurus
                - - Bagualia
                  - - Nebulasaurus
                    - Spinophorosaurus
              - - Tonganosaurus
                - - Mamenchisauridae
                  - - Cetiosaurus
                    - - Turiasauria
                      - - Jobaria
                        - Neosauropoda

Cladogram of Sauropoda after Holwerda et al. (2021):

- Sauropoda
  - - Vulcanodon
    - Tazoudasaurus
  - - - Barapasaurus
      - - Spinophorosaurus
        - Volkheimeria
    - Eusauropoda
      - Shunosaurus
      - - Cetiosauridae
          - Cetiosaurus oxoniensis
          - - Patagosaurus
            - Cetiosaurus Rutland specimen
        - - Mamenchisauridae
            - Omeisaurus
            - Mamenchisaurus
          - - Turiasauria
            - - Jobaria
              - Neosauropoda

Cladogram after Li et al. (2025):

- Eusauropoda
  - Shunosaurus
  - - Omeisaurus
    - - Mamenchisauridae
      - - - Jobaria
          - Lapparentosaurus
        - - Jinchuanloong
          - - Turiasauria
            - Neosauropoda
