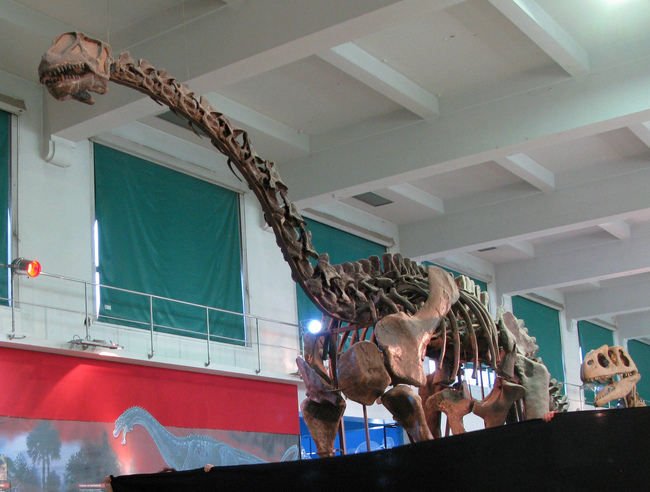
- Restored skeleton with reconstructed skull, Museo Argentino de Ciencias Naturales

Scientific classification
- Kingdom: Animalia
- Phylum: Chordata
- Class: Reptilia
- Clade: Dinosauria
- Clade: Saurischia
- Clade: †Sauropodomorpha
- Clade: †Sauropoda
- Family: †Cetiosauridae
- Genus: †Patagosaurus; Bonaparte, 1979
- Species: †P. fariasi

Binomial name
- †Patagosaurus fariasi Bonaparte, 1979

= Patagosaurus =

Patagosaurus Temporal range: Middle Toarcian~178.07 Ma

Extinct genus of dinosaurs

Patagosaurus (meaning "Patagonia lizard") is an extinct genus of eusauropod dinosaur from the middle Toarcian of Patagonia, Argentina. It was first found in deposits of the Cañadón Asfalto Formation, which date to around 178 million years ago. Although originally twelve specimens were assigned to the taxon, at least one of them may belong to a different genus. Patagosaurus probably lived alongside genera such as Piatnitzkysaurus, Condorraptor, and Volkheimeria.

Since Patagosaurus is known from many specimens, including at least one juvenile, its anatomy and growth are fairly well understood. Both ages exhibit the typical features of a sauropod: a long neck, small head, a long tail, and quadrupedal stance. The juvenile exhibits features different from the adult in regions like the mandible, pectoral girdle, pelvis, and hindlimb, although overall their anatomy is quite similar. The many known specimens help fill in gaps in the anatomy of the genus, such as the forelimb and skull. Parts of the skeleton, like the pectoral girdle, tibia, and pubis are more robust, while others, like the forelimb and ischium, are more gracile. The material of Patagosaurus is similar to closely related taxa like Cetiosaurus and Volkheimeria, more primitive genera such as Barapasaurus and Amygdalodon, and more derived sauropods like Diplodocus and Camarasaurus.

== Discovery and naming ==
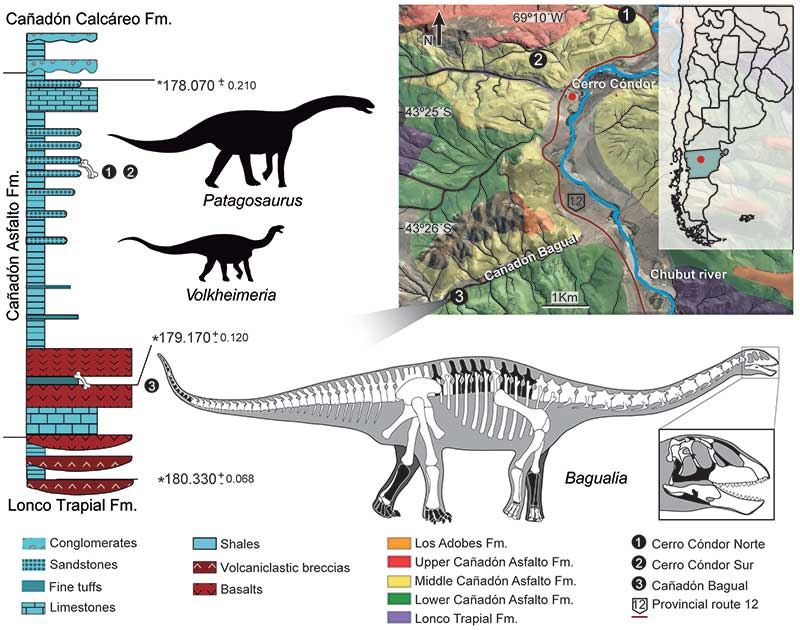
Location map and stratigraphic distribution of the main sauropods of the Cañadón Asfalto Formation

In the 1970s many specimens of a previously unidentified dinosaur were found associated together in the same bed and locality: a pebbly stratum near a route to Cerro Condor. The specimens were first described by José Bonaparte in 1979. For the fossil he erected the genus Patagosaurus, as well as its type species P. fariasi. The generic name of Patagosaurus comes from the location of its find in Patagonia, and the fact that it is a reptile. The specific name honours Ricardo Farias, on whose land the initial discovery was made. The genus was originally known from an almost complete postcranial skeleton lacking a skull as the holotype, and many referred specimens; however, in 2003 it was found that a dentary was referable to the species, so more specimens are probably this taxon. Its skeleton was found near those of Piatnitzkysaurus and Volkheimeria in the layers originally suggested as Callovian- to Oxfordian-aged Patagonian deposits of the Cañadón Asfalto Formation. These layers have been recently re-dated, finding out thanks to advanced zircon datation that the bones of the three genera and all the vertebrates of Las Charcitas member where deposited in between 179 and 178 million years, that is Middle-Late Toarcian. Patagosaurus is almost completely known with many articulated specimens found covering almost all of the skeleton, including parts of the skull. Over twelve specimens have been referred to the species, although some of the material is probably from a unique taxon. Bonaparte (1986) assigned three specimens other than the holotype PVL 4170, PVL 4076, MACN CH 934 and MACN CH 933 to the genus. While the holotype includes a postcranial skeleton, the others are known from cranial material and a nearly complete juvenile skeleton and skull. MACN CH 933 is directly comparable with the type material of Patagosaurus, which confirms its association with the genus. A specimen first referred to Patagosaurus in 2003, MPEF-PV 1670 (which includes just a lower jaw), is also very similar to MACN CH 933, and differences can be associated with age, so therefore, MPEF-PV 1670 presumably represents adult cranial material. However, the teeth of MACN CH 934 are very different from those of both lower jaws (MACN CH 933 and MPEF-PV 1670), so it can be identified as another sauropod from the same deposit as Patagosaurus. Thus, the taxon only certainly includes PVL 4170, MACN CH 933 and MPEF-PV 1670.

== Description ==
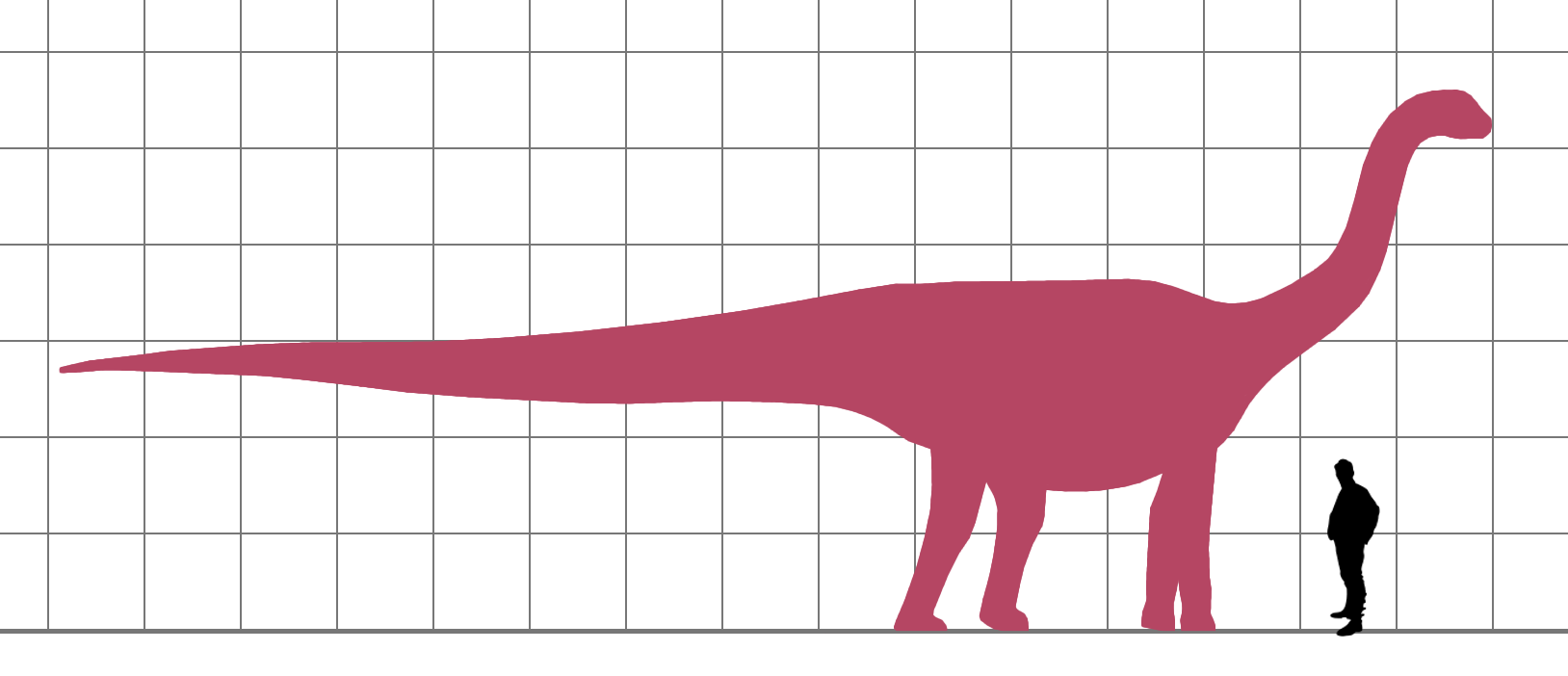
Size comparison with a human

Patagosaurus is a sauropod that possessed a general and unspecialized bauplan of being quadrupedal, having an elongate neck, a small head and a very long tail. Therefore, it is similar to Cetiosaurus and other related genera, who possessed the same morphology. It has been estimated that it was about 16.5 m (54 ft) long and weighed about 7.88 tonnes (7.8 long tons; 8.7 short tons). An earlier estimate by John S. McIntosh and his colleagues in 1997, found that Patagosaurus was approximately 15 m (49 ft) long, and also 9.44 metric tons (9.3 long tons; 10.4 short tons) in weight, similar to the later estimates by Holtz. A 2006 study by Donald M. Henderson calculated the weight of Patagosaurus to be 7.89 t (7.8 long tons; 8.7 short tons), a smaller estimate than McIntosh's.

The skull of Patagosaurus is not very well known, with a 2003 revision by Oliver Rauhut determining only a few jaws are certainly referrable to it, as opposed to nearly the entire skull. MPEF-PV 1670 shows what the morphology of the adult or subadult skull was like, while MACN CH 933 represents a juvenile individual. Based upon how broad, high and short the adult articulated mandibles of Patagosaurus are, its snout would have been short, high and broad as well, a typical feature of most sauropods.

The teeth of Patagosaurus are reminiscent of more derived sauropods. They are similar in morphology to Euhelopus, being concave on one side as well as having crowns with fairly great expansions. They are also similar to Camarasaurus, although the latter genus has less of a concavity and expansion. The teeth also possess marginal denticles on the crown. Based on histological studies, an individual of Patagosaurus would have replaced a tooth every 58 days, similar to 62 days for Camarasaurus, and 34 days for Diplodocus.

=== Postcranial skeleton ===
Cervical vertebra in right lateral view

Most of the postcranial skeleton is known in Patagosaurus. The cervical, caudal and dorsal vertebrae are generally similar to Camarasaurus, although the sacrum possesses many distinct features. The sacrum is well preserved, showing that Patagosaurus possessed five sacral vertebrae. All the vertebrae but the fifth are fused together. All the neural spines are tall, and the centra are occasionally transversely narrow. The neural canal of the vertebrae is unique among sauropods, however. Starting from the very end of the first vertebra, and extending to almost the end of the third there is an enlargement of the canal, forming a well-defined cavity. Even though the sacrum itself is distinguishing, its sacral ribs resemble Camarasaurus. The sacral vertebrae have a total length of 540 mm (21 in), with the total sacral length being 920 mm (36 in).

The pelvic girdle is well preserved and well studied. In the holotype, the pelvic girdle is almost complete, only lacking the proximal ends of each ischium. The ilia of the holotype are well known, and show many distinct features. The pubic peduncle, where the ilium articulates with the pubis, is long and straight and has an expansion on the end, as in many sauropods. The upper edge of the iliac blade is curved and thick, with rugosities (rough spots) for cartilage attachment. The pubic elements are large and robust in adults, more so than in juveniles. They are flat when viewed from in front, and convex when seen from behind. Lapparentosaurus resembles Patagosaurus when comparing their pubes. The ischia are much more gracile than the pubes, and only have a small distal expansion. While the ilia resemble Barapasaurus, and the pubes resemble Lapparentosaurus, the ischia are most similar to Diplodocus and Apatosaurus.

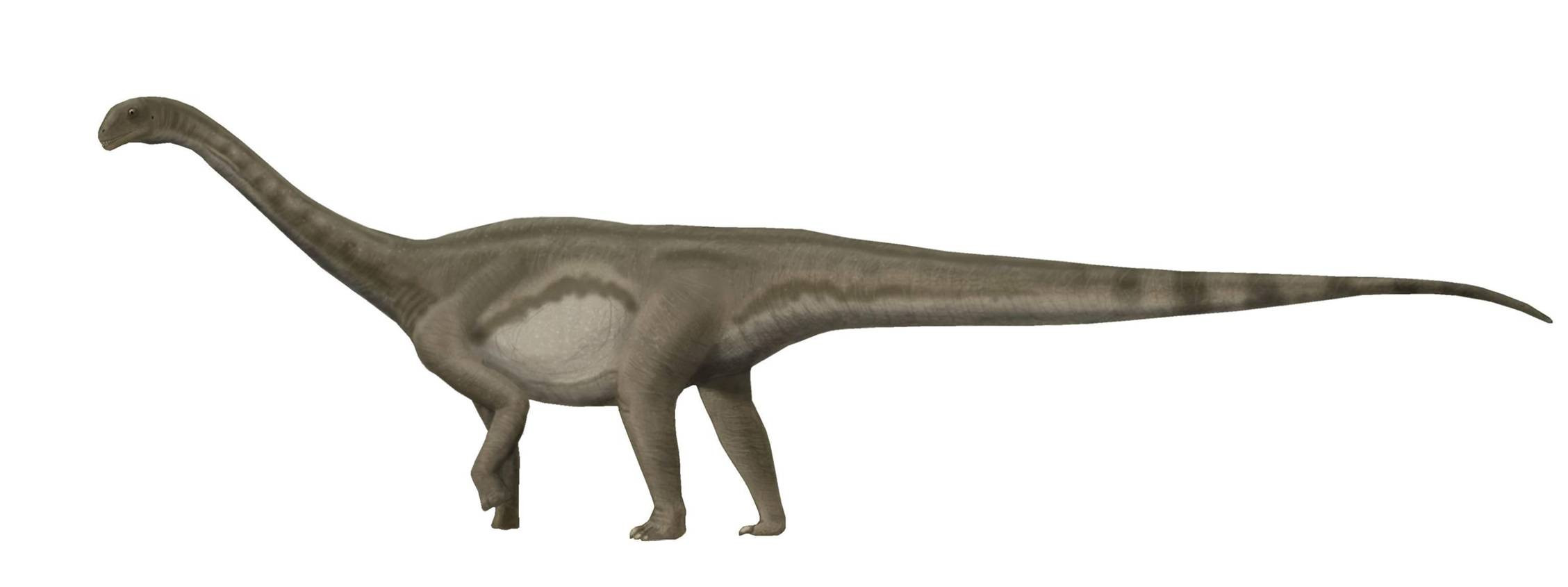
Life restoration

The hindlimbs of Patagosaurus are based on scant material, some femora, a tibia and a few nondescript pedal bones. Two femora come from an adult, with a single additional bone known from the juvenile. The adult femora are proportionately different from the juvenile, being mostly straighter and more ovoid in cross-section. The femoral head is well preserved, although lacking the greater trochanter. The distal end is rather symmetrical when viewed from behind, with two similarly sized condylar surfaces. In the juvenile, the fourth trochanter is completely in the proximal end. The tibia has a well-developed cnemial crest, and is also short and robust. The surface that would have articulated with the astragalus in life has the anterior half raised, and the posterior half lowered.

The pectoral girdle is well known. Both the left and right scapulae and coracoids are known, though incomplete. The scapulae are large and robust, and thicken as they near the glenoids. The scapular blades are flat, although they are both convex along the anterior edge. Where the scapulae and coracoids articulate, the coracoids are thickest, and they become gradually thinner as they gain distance from the scapulae. The younger specimen of Patagosaurus possesses a slightly different morphology of the pectoral girdle, with slightly differing proportions, such as a slightly smaller scapular blade. The coracoids resemble Barapasaurus in shape, and differ from Camarasaurus, although they cannot be directly compared with those of Cetiosaurus.

The forelimbs of Patagosaurus are only based on three bones from the juvenile specimen, and no manual elements are preserved. The humeri are slender and elongate, lacking great proximal and distal expansions. The incomplete deltoid crest, only shows that it was wide, and likely had a projection below and behind. Like the humeri, the radius is slender, and lacks large expansions on either end. On the edge closest to the ulna, the radius possesses a ridge along its edge, which corresponds to where radioulnar ligaments would have attached. The ulna is complete, although sediment-filled breaks might have altered its original shape. The forelimb of Patagosaurus is much more gracile and different from the robust later sauropods like Camarasaurus and Apatosaurus, and instead resembles more Diplodocus.

== Classification ==
When originally described, Patagosaurus was identified as a relative of Cetiosaurus in the family Cetiosauridae. It can be distinguished from Cetiosaurus, a similar genus, by features of the ischium and vertebrae. Another genus also identified as a cetiosaurid by Bonaparte, Volkheimeria, was named in the same paper as Patagosaurus. Features uniting the genera were identified in the pelvic structure and vertebrae, specifically the caudal neural spines and the ilium and ischium. These characteristics show that the genera are more derived than Amygdalodon, yet more primitive than Haplocanthosaurus.

Later in 1995, Paul Upchurch published a paper on early sauropods, finding Patagosaurus as a cetiosaurid again. He found that although earlier works had distinguished two groups, the shunosaurines and cetiosaurines, in the family, but that Shunosaurus and relatives were actually closer to Euhelopus, and cetiosaurines (Cetiosaurus, Patagosaurus and Amygdalodon) were the only true cetiosaurids. Upchurch noted, however, that further work on the group might reveal different conclusions.

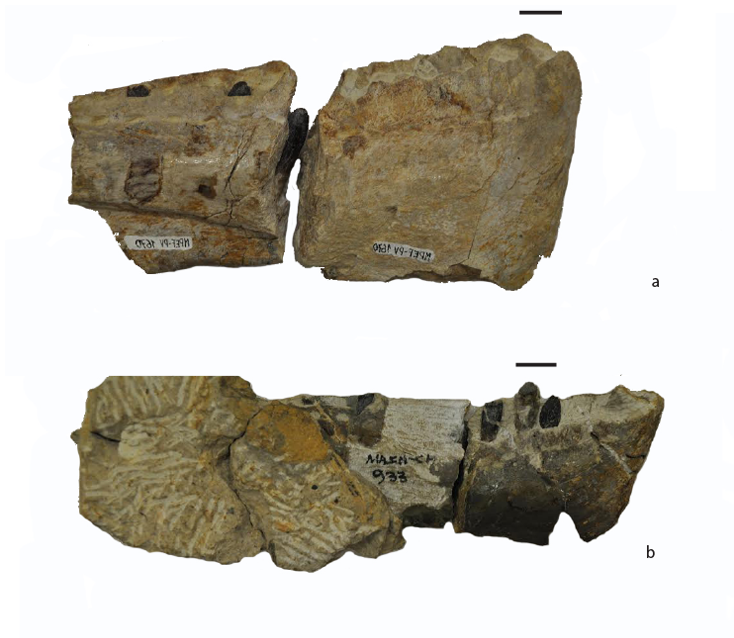
Two cranial specimens, MPEF-PV 1670 and MACN-CH 933

In a 2009 revision of Euhelopus, Jeffrey A. Wilson and Upchurch published a joint analysis on primitive eusauropodan relationships. They found that Patagosaurus was in fact not a sister taxon of Cetiosaurus, but instead more basal than the genus, effectively invalidating Cetiosauridae.

A 2021 study found Patagosaurus to be a member of Cetiosauridae.

- Sauropoda
  - Vulcanodontidae
    - Vulcanodon
    - Tazoudasaurus
  - - - Barapasaurus
      - - Spinophorosaurus
        - Volkheimeria
    - Eusauropoda
      - Shunosaurus
      - - Cetiosauridae
          - Cetiosaurus oxoniensis
          - - Patagosaurus
            - Cetiosaurus Rutland specimen
        - - Mamenchisauridae
            - Omeisaurus
            - Mamenchisaurus
          - - Turiasauria
            - - Jobaria
              - Neosauropoda

Successive phylogenetic analyses from 2020, 2021, and 2024 have confirmed a close relationship between Bagualia, Nebulasaurus, Patagosaurus, and Spinophorosaurus. The results of Gomez et al. (2024) are shown in the cladogram below:

- Sauropoda
  - Antetonitrus
  - - Ingentia
    - Lessemsaurus
  - - Ledumahadi
    - Pulanesaura
    - - - Gongxianosaurus
        - Amygdalodon
        - NHMUK PVR 36834
      - - Archaeodontosaurus
        - Volkheimeria
        - Sanpasaurus
        - Vulcanodon
        - Tazoudasaurus
        - Eusauropoda
          - Shunosaurus
          - - Barapasaurus
            - - - Patagosaurus
                - - Bagualia
                  - - Nebulasaurus
                    - Spinophorosaurus
              - - Tonganosaurus
                - - Mamenchisauridae
                  - - Cetiosaurus
                    - - Turiasauria
                      - - Jobaria
                        - Neosauropoda

== Paleoecology ==
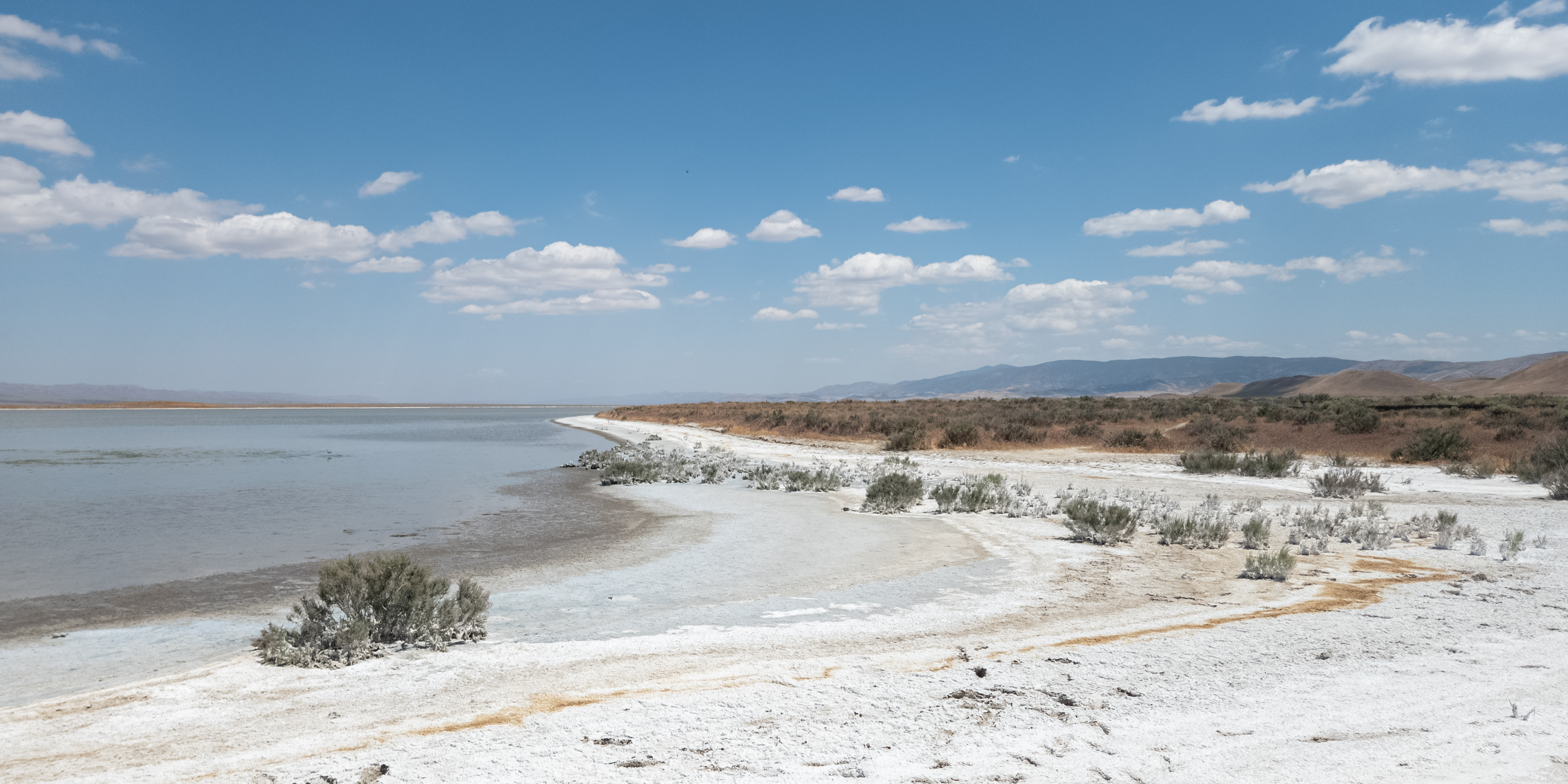
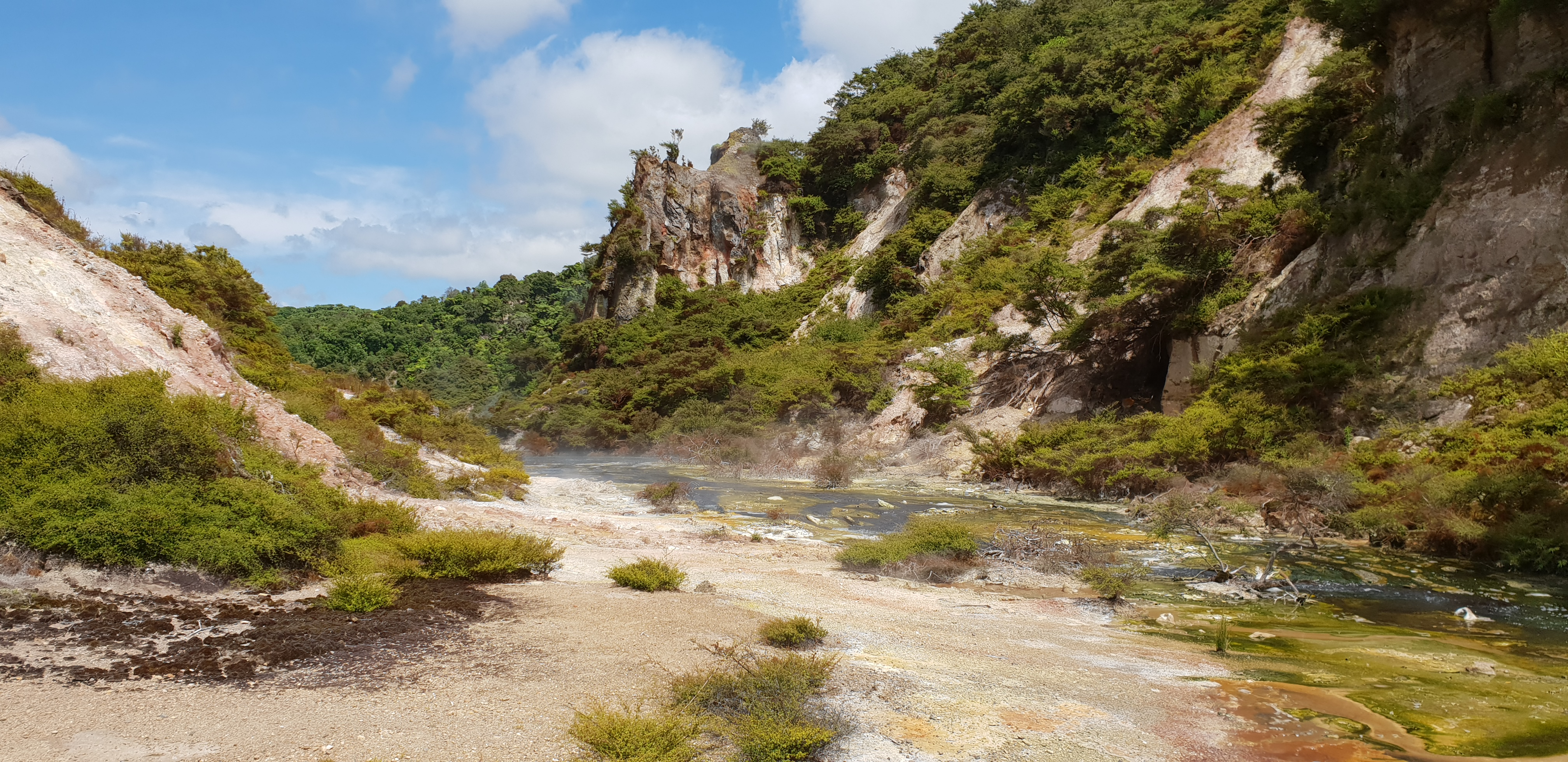
The Chacritas Member hosted volcanic-influenced soda lake (Example from modern California), while nearby environments hosted varied floral belts from coastal Cheirolepidaceous forests to highland Podocarps (Modern Equivalent from New Zealand), a rift area with nearby volcanic influence of the Chon Aike Province

Patagosaurus was uncovered in the Jurassic Cañadón Asfalto Formation, originally thought to be Middle or Late Jurassic, but found recently to be Late Early Jurassic (Middle Toarcian) in age. The Chacritas Member hosted and hypersaline and alkaline lake similar to modern Lake Magadi in Kenya, while nearby environments where developed in a similar way to modern Waimangu Volcanic Rift Valley of New Zealand, with nearby volcanic influence of the Chon Aike ProvinceThe holotype of Manidens comes from the Chacritas Member of the Cañadón Asfalto Formation. This member is mostly made of two major depositional settings: lacustrine and fluvial deposits, that have intervals of tuffaceous materials, suggesting this environments coevolved with volcanic activity. Palustrine littoral environments levels are seen at Cerro Cóndor and Estancia Fossati, characterized by the presence of lacustrine limestones interbedded with shales, tuffs and sandstones. The lacustrine section has been called the "Chacritas Paleolake", and seems to have been a rather saline or even hypersaline hydrologically closed pan lake, shallow in deep, with marginal zones and palustrine subenvironments made of low-energy ramp-like margins. This unit preserves a large variety of flora and fauna. Directly below the formation is a layer of ash, indicating a nearby volcano. Floral composition was made of Lycophytes, Equisetales, Ferns, Conifers, Bennettitales and Peltaspermales, all along abundance of charcoal particles, suggest frequent Wildfires and/or Forest fires. Deep lacutrine bodies show abundance of Charales. The fauna is dominated by tetrapods, ranging from aquatic amphibians to terrestrial turtles, mammals and dinosaurs. The sole amphibian known is Notobatrachus; turtles are represented by a distinct form that was named Condorchelys; mammals are known from a few genera, including Argentoconodon, Asfaltomylos and Henosferus; multiple dinosaurs have been identified, including the Heterodontosaur Manidens, sauropods Volkheimeria, Bagualia, Patagosaurus and a few other genera, and theropods include the related Piatnitzkysaurus and Condorraptor, as well Asfaltovenator & Eoabelisaurus.

Despite coexisting with multiple other sauropod taxa, Patagosaurus was able to avoid direct competition with them, as its tooth morphology differed substantially from coeval sauropod taxa, a feature indicative of significant dietary niche partitioning in its ecosystem. The thinner enamel of Patagosaurus may be related to its consumption of more abrasive vegetation.
