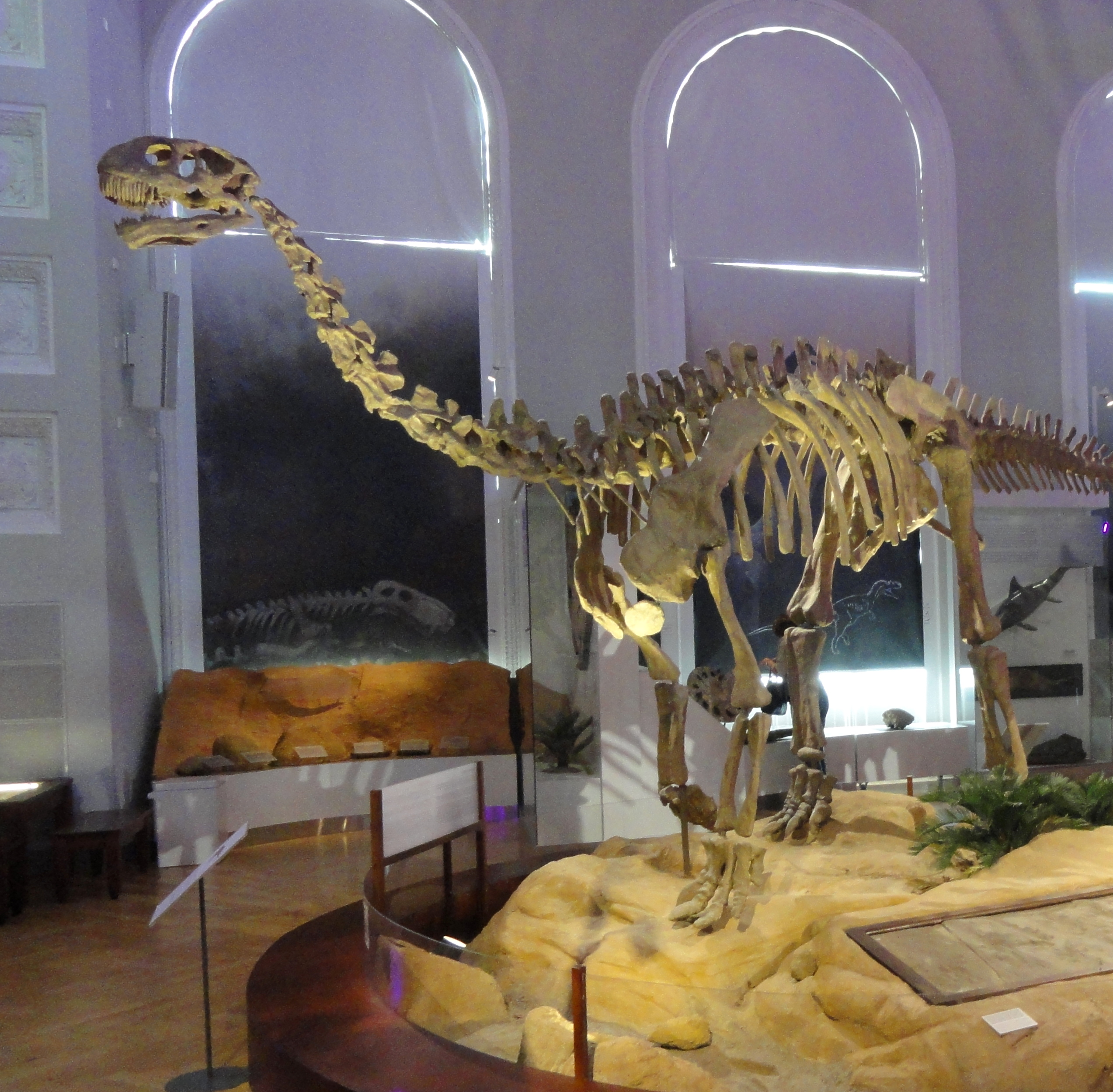
- Mount in the Finnish Museum of Natural History

Scientific classification
- Kingdom: Animalia
- Phylum: Chordata
- Class: Reptilia
- Clade: Dinosauria
- Clade: Saurischia
- Clade: †Sauropodomorpha
- Clade: †Sauropoda
- Clade: †Eusauropoda
- Genus: †Shunosaurus; Dong et al., 1983

Type species
- †Shunosaurus lii Dong et al., 1983

Other species
- †Shunosaurus jiangyiensis Fu & Zhang, 2004

= Shunosaurus =

Shunosaurus Temporal range: Late Jurassic (Oxfordian), 161–157 Ma

Extinct genus of dinosaurs

Shunosaurus (lit. 'lizard from Sichuan') is a genus of sauropod dinosaur from Late Jurassic (Oxfordian) beds in Sichuan Province in China, from 161 to 157 Million years ago. The name derives from "Shu", an ancient name for the Sichuan province.

== Discovery and species ==
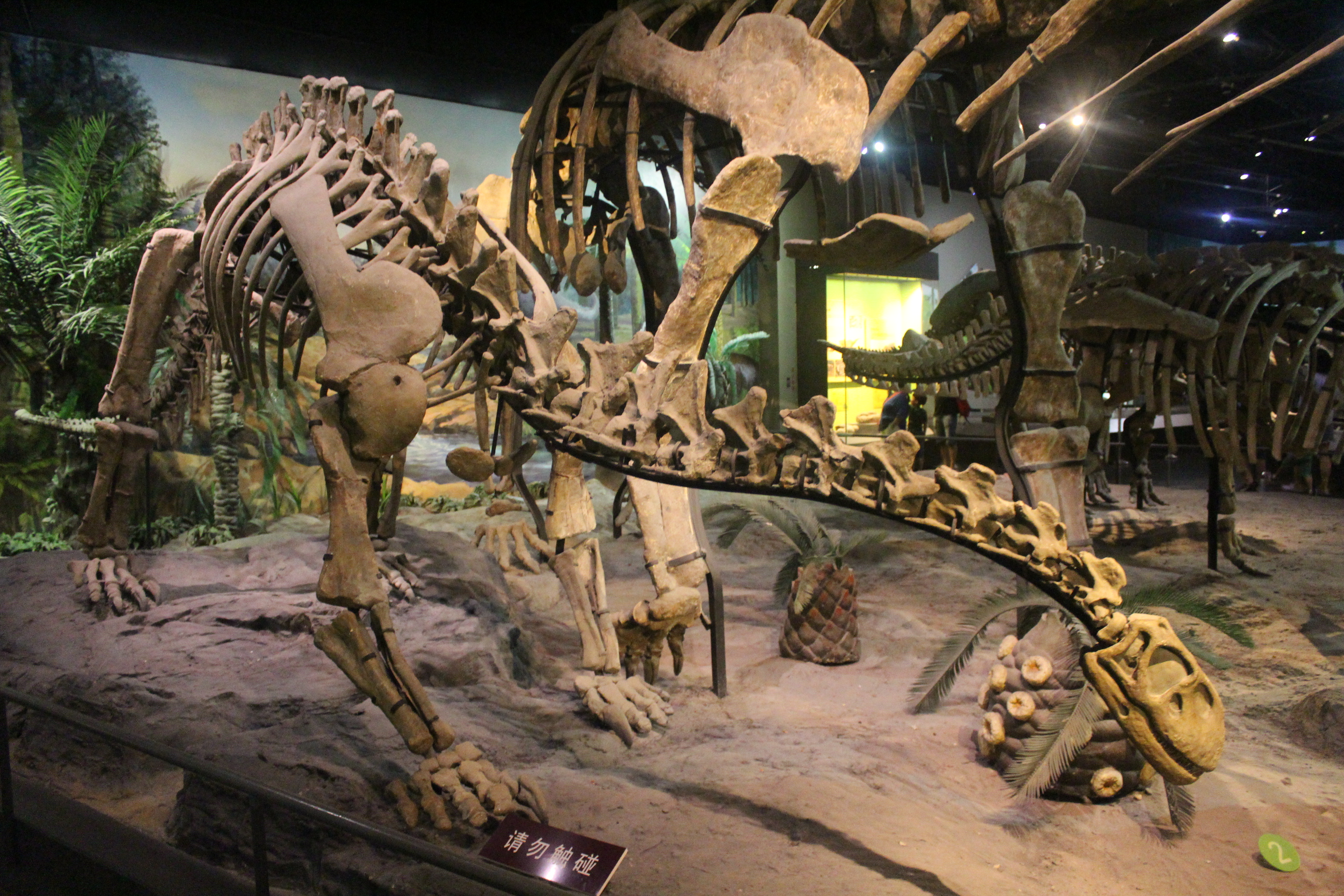
Skeletal cast mount, Tianjin Natural History Museum

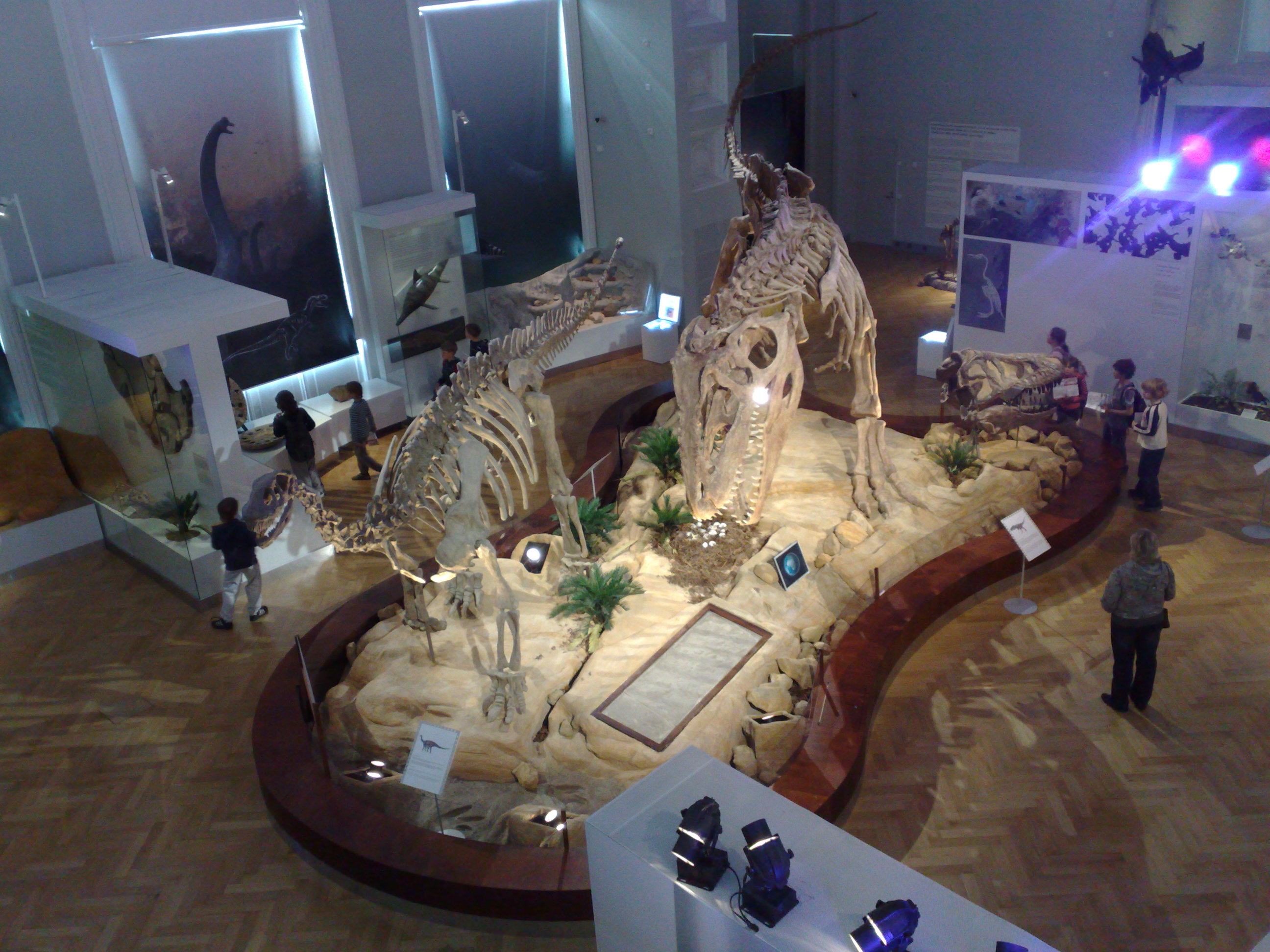
Skeletons of Shunosaurus (left) and Giganotosaurus (right) in the Natural History Museum of Helsinki, Finland

The first fossil of Shunosaurus, a partial skeleton, was discovered in 1977 by a group of students, practising paleontological excavation at a road bank at Dashanpu, Zigong, Sichuan. The new genus and species Shunosaurus lii were described and named based on this specimen by Dong Zhiming, Zhou Shiwu and Zhang Yihong in 1983. The generic name derives from "Shu", an ancient name for Sichuan. The specific name honours hydrologist Li Bing, the governor of Sichuan in the third century BC. The following year, about twenty more specimens were reported, including several complete or near-complete skeletons, skulls and juveniles, making Shunosaurus one of the best anatomically known sauropods, with 94% of all skeletal elements identified. Shunosaurus skeletons are on display at the Zigong Dinosaur Museum in Zigong, Sichuan Province, and the Tianjin Natural History Museum.

A proposed second species, S. ziliujingensis, a name mentioned in the Zigong museum guide to indicate a smaller and older form, has never been formally described, and thus remains a nomen nudum.

In 2004 a partial semi-articulated specimen from Jiangyi Township in Yuanmou County was described as the new species Shunosaurus jiangyiensis. The species was separated from Shunosaurus lii based on its unique pectoral girdle, but was described as otherwise very similar to both Shunosaurus lii and Kunmingosaurus.

=== Fossil record ===
Shunosaurus lii is one of the most completely known sauropod species. It is one of only two sauropod species in which more than one specimen with a nearly complete neck is known, and among the few where the last caudal vertebra, at the very tip of the tail, is confirmed to be preserved. S. lii fossils are known from the lower Shaximiao Formation, the age of which is disputed; it has historically been considered to be of Middle Jurassic age, but detrital zircons suggest a maximum age of 159±2 million years for the formation, corresponding to the Oxfordian age of the Late Jurassic. Most specimens were collected at a single locality, the Dashanpu Quarry in Zigong, Sichuan, which is the type locality of the species. The holotype, IVPP V 9065, is a partial skeleton comprising five cervical vertebrae, 13 dorsal vertebrae, a fragmentary sacral centrum, two caudal vertebrae, the left radius and ulna, a carpal, a poorly preserved ilium, ischium, and pubis, and a left hind limb lacking some of the phalanges. Other known specimens from Dashanpu include two nearly complete skeletons, the juvenile ZDM 5006 (formerly T5401) and adult ZDM 5003 (formerly T5402), as well as two nearly complete skulls, ZDM 5009 (formerly T5403) and ZG65430, and a mostly complete skeleton lacking the skull, ZDM 5008 (formerly T5404). A partial skeleton of a juvenile individual, CLGPR V00007, was collected at a different locality, in Yunyang County, Chongqing.

Shunosaurus jiangyiensis is known from a single partial skeleton, the holotype YJ2001, which consists of nine cervicals, 15 dorsals, three sacrals, four caudals, both scapulae, the right coracoid and clavicle, the right forelimb lacking the hand, a pubis and ischium and the right hindlimb. This specimen was found in the lower Shaximiao Formation in Yuanmou County, Yunnan.

== Description ==
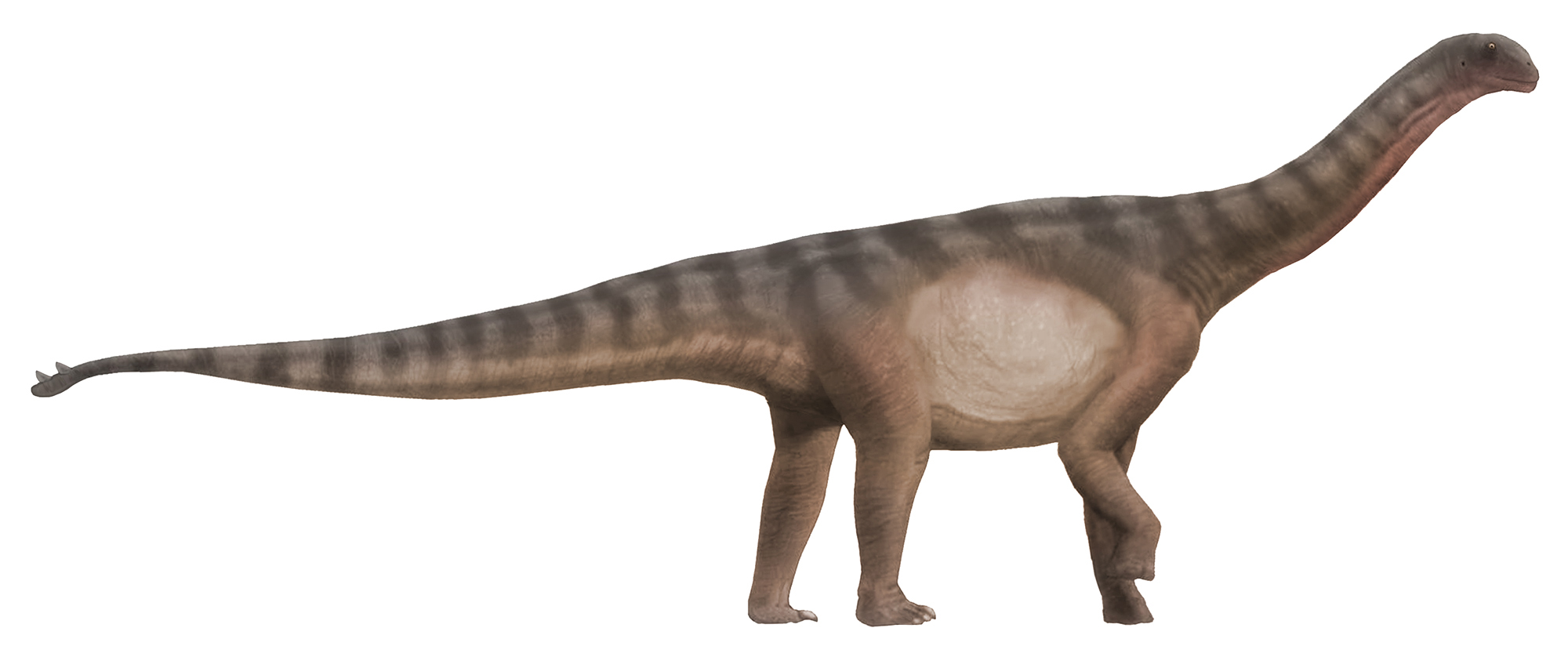
Life restoration

Size comparison

Shunosaurus was first estimated to be 11 metres (36 ft) long; later and more complete finds indicated a somewhat smaller size. In 2010 Gregory S. Paul estimated the length at 9.5 metres (31 ft), the weight at 3 metric tons (3.3 short tons). Shunosaurus was very short-necked for a sauropod, comparable to certain members of Dicraeosauridae. The skulls found are mostly compressed or disarticulated and the interpretation of the head form has varied from broad, short and deep to extremely narrow and pointed. The upper and lower jaws were strongly curved upwards, allowing them to function as a pair of garden shears. The teeth were fairly robust but elongated with a crown length of up to 8 centimetres (3.1 in). They show a unique combination of a cylindrical body ending in a spatulate tip. Published in 1989 was the discovery that the tail ended in a club, equipped on its top with two successive spikes formed by cone-shaped osteoderms with a length of 5 centimetres (2.0 in). The club was probably used to fend off predators.

== Classification ==
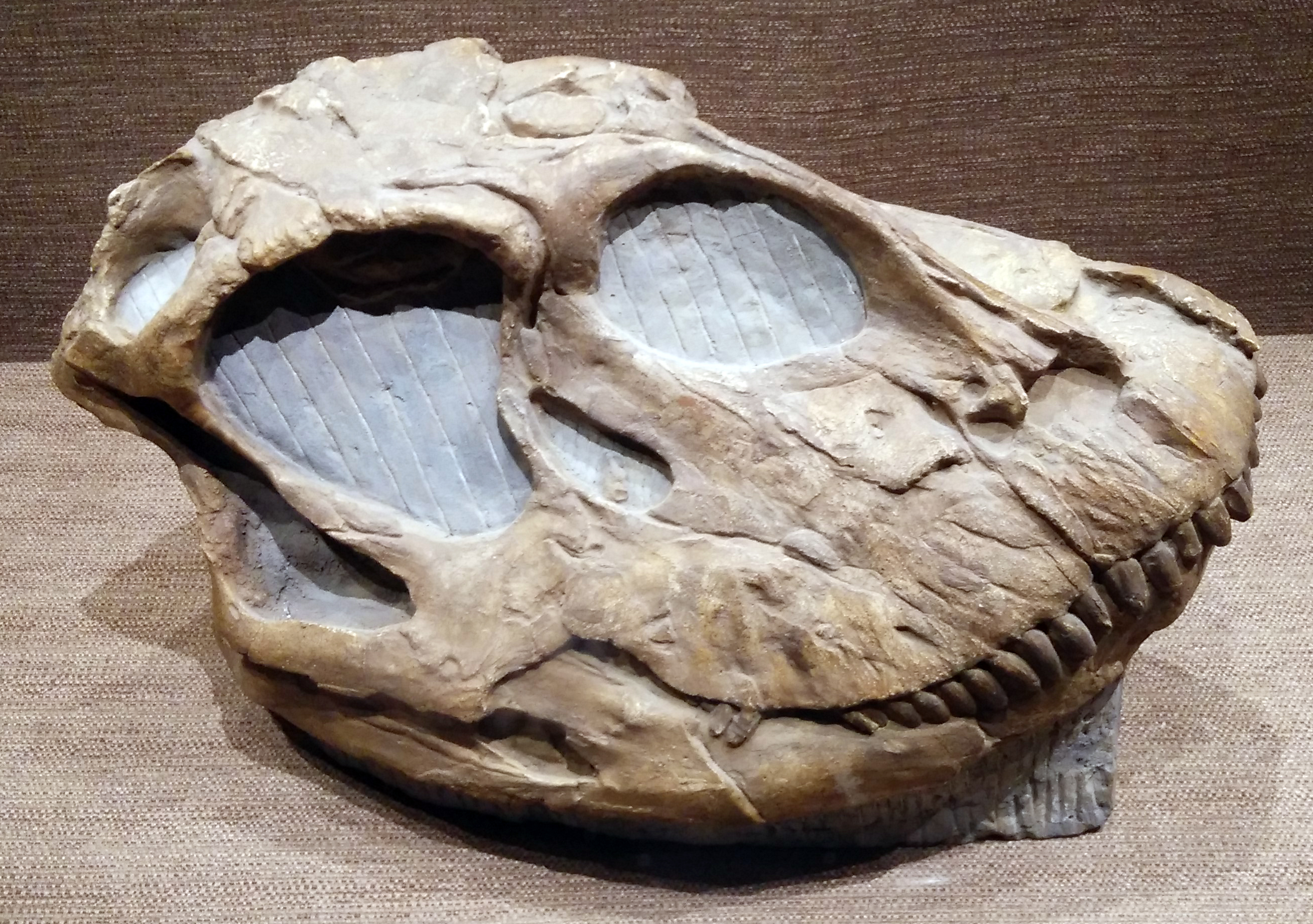
Skull

Shunosaurus was originally classified as a member of the Cetiosaurinae; in 1992 Dong assigned it to Shunosaurinae within the Cetiosauridae.

Cladistic analyses have rendered conflicting results. In 1995 Paul Upchurch published a study in which Shunosaurus belonged to the Euhelopodidae together with other Jurassic Chinese sauropods. However, an analysis by Jeffrey Wilson in 2002 indicated it had a very basal position within the Eusauropoda. Shunosaurus is perhaps related to Rhoetosaurus from Queensland in Australia.

Cladogram of Sauropoda after Holwerda et al 2021, showing the position of Shunosaurus:

- Sauropoda
  - - Vulcanodon
    - Tazoudasaurus
  - - - Barapasaurus
      - - Spinophorosaurus
        - Volkheimeria
    - Eusauropoda
      - Shunosaurus
      - - Cetiosauridae
          - Cetiosaurus oxoniensis
          - - Patagosaurus
            - Cetiosaurus Rutland specimen
        - - Mamenchisauridae
            - Omeisaurus
            - Mamenchisaurus
          - - Turiasauria
            - - Jobaria
              - Neosauropoda

== Paleobiology ==
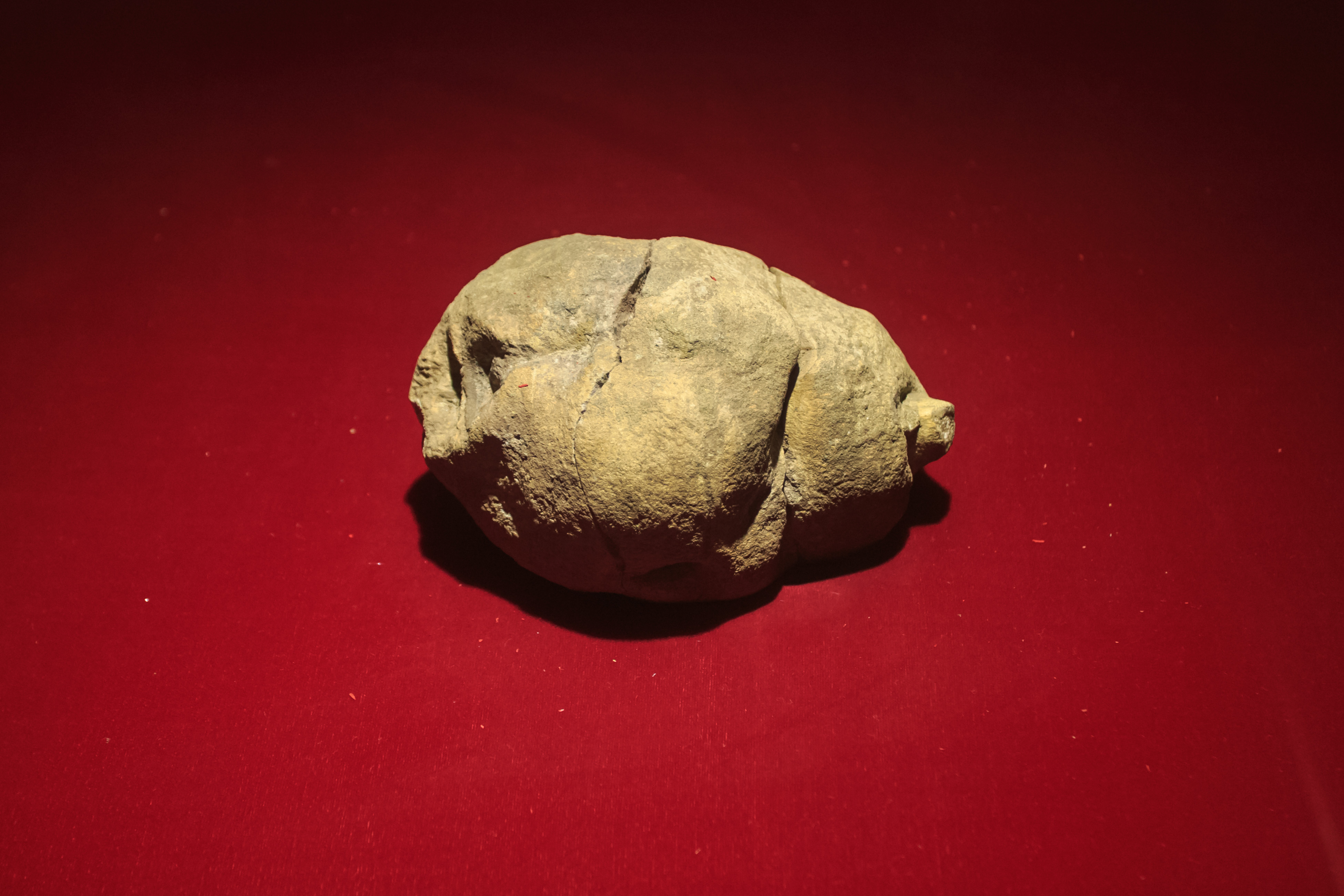
Tail-club

Its neck length indicates that Shunosaurus was a low browser. The form of its jaws is well-adapted to processing large amounts of coarse plant material.

Shunosaurus accounts for 90% of the fossils found in the Dashanpu fauna, showing it was a dominant and/ or common member of its habitat and environment. It shared the local Middle Jurassic landscape with other sauropods, Datousaurus, Omeisaurus and Protognathosaurus, the possible ornithopod Xiaosaurus, and the early stegosaur Huayangosaurus, as well as the carnivorous theropod Gasosaurus.
