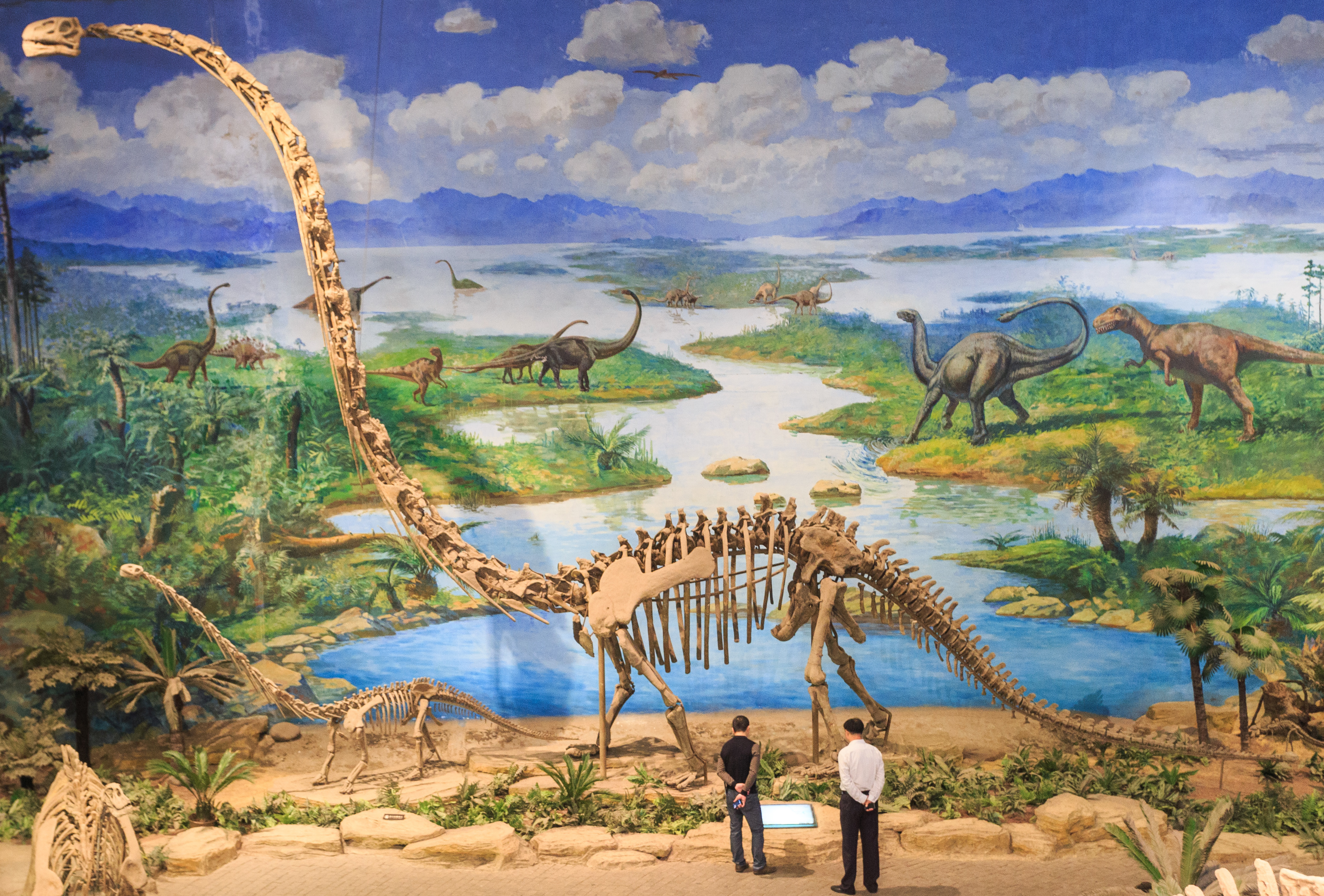
- O. tianfuensis on display at the Zigong Museum

Scientific classification
- Kingdom: Animalia
- Phylum: Chordata
- Class: Reptilia
- Clade: Dinosauria
- Clade: Saurischia
- Clade: †Sauropodomorpha
- Clade: †Sauropoda
- Family: †Mamenchisauridae
- Genus: †Omeisaurus; Young, 1939

Type species
- †Omeisaurus junghsiensis Young, 1939

Species
- †O. junghsiensis Young, 1939; †O. changshouensis Young, 1958; †O. fuxiensis Dong, Zhou & Zhang, 1983; †O. tianfuensis He et al., 1984; †O. luoquanensis He, Li & Cai, 1988; †O. maoianus Tang et al., 2001; †O. jiaoi Jiang et al., 2011; †O. puxiani Tan et al., 2021

= Omeisaurus =

Omeisaurus Temporal range: 168.2–154.8 Ma

Extinct genus of dinosaurs

Omeisaurus (meaning "Omei lizard") is a genus of sauropod dinosaur from the Middle to Late Jurassic Period (Bathonian-Oxfordian stage) of what is now China. Its name comes from Mount Emei, where it was discovered in the lower Shaximiao Formation of Sichuan Province.

Like most sauropods, Omeisaurus was herbivorous and large. The largest species, O. tianfuensis, measured 18–20.2 metres (59–66 ft) long, and weighed 8.5–9.8 metric tons (9.4–10.8 short tons). Other species were much smaller, as the type species O. junghsiensis reached a size of 14 metres (46 ft) in length and 4 metric tons (4.4 short tons) in body mass, and O. maoianus reached a size of 15 metres (49 ft) and 5 metric tons (5.5 short tons).

== Discovery and species ==
=== Initial discovery and O. changshouensis ===
The initial discovery of Omeisaurus was in 1936 when Charles Lewis Camp and Yang Zhongjian collected a partial skeleton from strata of the Shaximiao Formation in Sichuan, China. The material was taken to and prepared in what is now the Institute of Vertebrate Paleontology and Paleoanthropology in Beijing. The skeleton was named Omeisaurus junghsiensis in 1939 by Yang Zhongjian, the skeleton consisting of a partial postcranial skeleton that included four cervical (neck) vertebrae. It was named after the sacred mountain Omeishan, which is near where O. junghsiensis was found, and the species name after the locality. The skeleton of O. junghsiensis was lost during WWII. In 1955, Xuanmin Li and colleagues collected several Sauropod remains from the same strata as O. junghsiensis in Changshou during construction of a reservoir. The IVPP sent Youling Su to conduct the excavation in Changshou, the crew finding eleven vertebrae and several appendicular elements (IVPP V930). The specimen was described later in 1958, also by Yang Zhongjian, as a new species, O. changshouensis.

=== Discoveries at Wujiaba ===
During the construction of the Wujiaba Dam in Zigong during the mid-to-late 1970s, crews discovered many large Sauropod remains from strata of the Upper Shaximiao Formation. The amount of material was vast and was collected by the Chongqing Museum of Natural History over five years, and was prepped and briefly described. The material consisted of many partial skulls and skeletons, consisting of between thirteen and sixteen individuals and 2 composite skeletons were later mounted in Chongqing and Zigong. Wujiaba also saw the collection of a fragmentary partial skull of an additional species of Omeisaurus, Omeisaurus fuxiensis, that was described by Zhiming Dong and colleagues in 1983.

=== Dashanpu Quarry finds ===
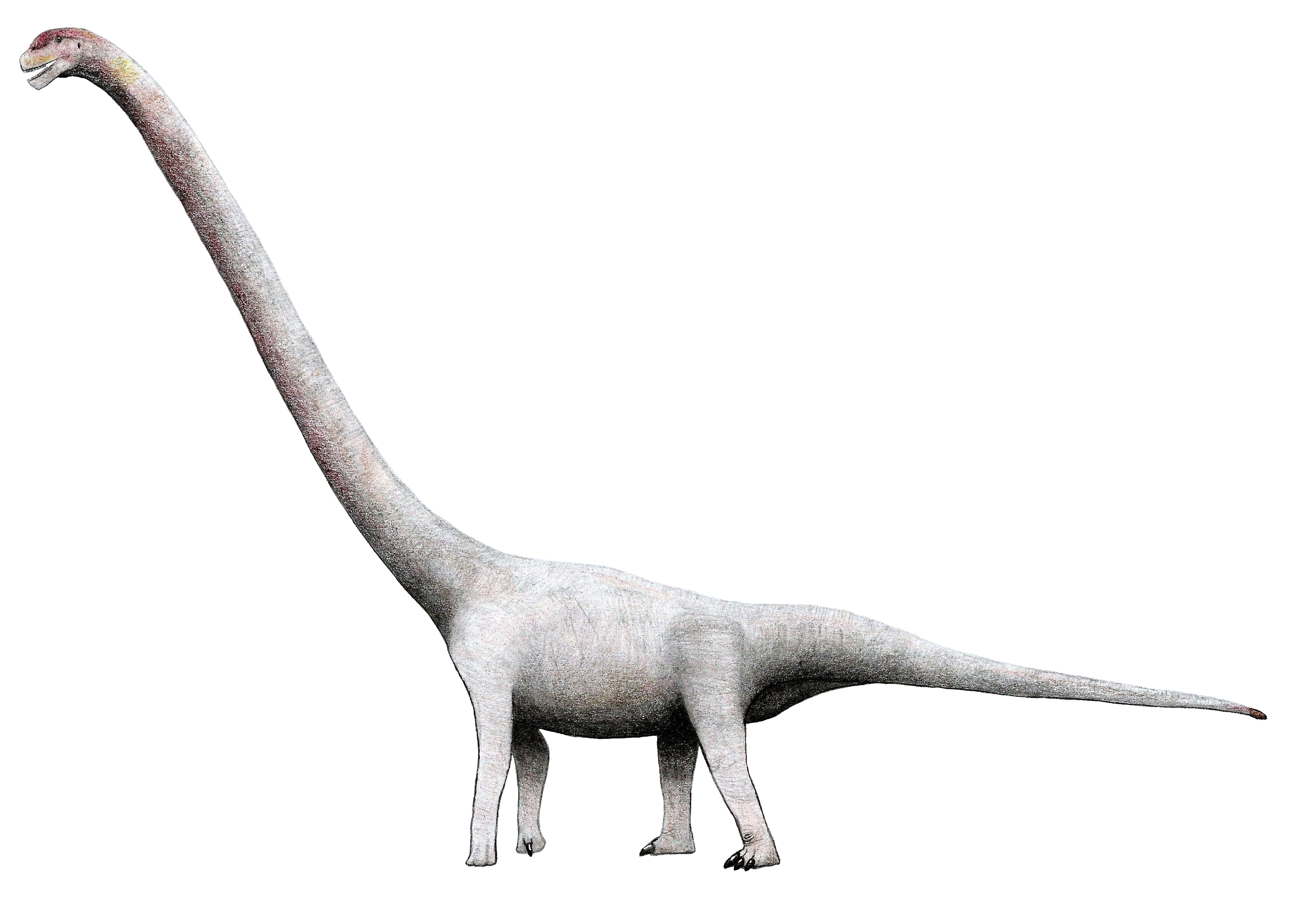
Life restoration of O. tianfuensis

The next and most bountiful Omeisaurus discovery came in the 1980s when many dinosaur remains were found at Dashanpu in Zigong, these remains including a nearly complete skeleton, several skulls, and additional postcrania from several individuals. The best of these skeletons, a nearly complete and semi articulated postcranial skeleton (ZDM T5701), was selected as the holotype and described by He et al in 1984. A nearly complete skull and partial postcranial skeleton (ZDM T5702) was selected as the paratype, and is one of the few known Omeisaurus specimens with a well preserved skull. The several specimens were described in much detail later in 1988, with a skeleton mounted at the Zigong Dinosaur Museum sometime later. Interestingly, O. tianfuensis was discovered to have a tail club on the end of its caudal vertebrae based on a specimen from Dashanpu. A second new species was named in 1988, O. luoquanensis, in the osteology of O. tianfuensis off of a partial postcranial skeleton.

=== Recent discoveries ===
Several Omeisaurus species have been named since the 1980s, with the most complete of them coming in 2001 with Omeisaurus maoianus from the Shaximiao Formation in Jingyan. O. maoianus was collected by Jin Xingshen and Zhang Guojin during the 1990s and the remains consisted of a skull, partial vertebral column, and several additional postcranial elements (ZNM N8510). O. maoianus was mounted at the Zhejiang Natural History Museum with its holotype skull on display. O. maoianus' generic assessment has been questioned, with several phylogenetic analyses finding it more closely related to Mamenchisaurus and Xinjiangtitan. 10 years later in 2011, Omeisaurus jiaoi was named based on a well preserved and partially articulated postcranial skeleton, also from Zigong and is deposited at the Zigong Dinosaur Museum (ZDM 5050). The most recently named Omeisaurus species, O. puxiani, was discovered in Yunyang and is one of the best preserved Omeisaurus species, with fossils from most of the vertebral column and girdles recovered. The specimen is deposited under CLGRP V00005 at the Chongqing Laboratory of Geoheritage Protection and Research.

== Classification ==
Size comparison of O. tianfuensis

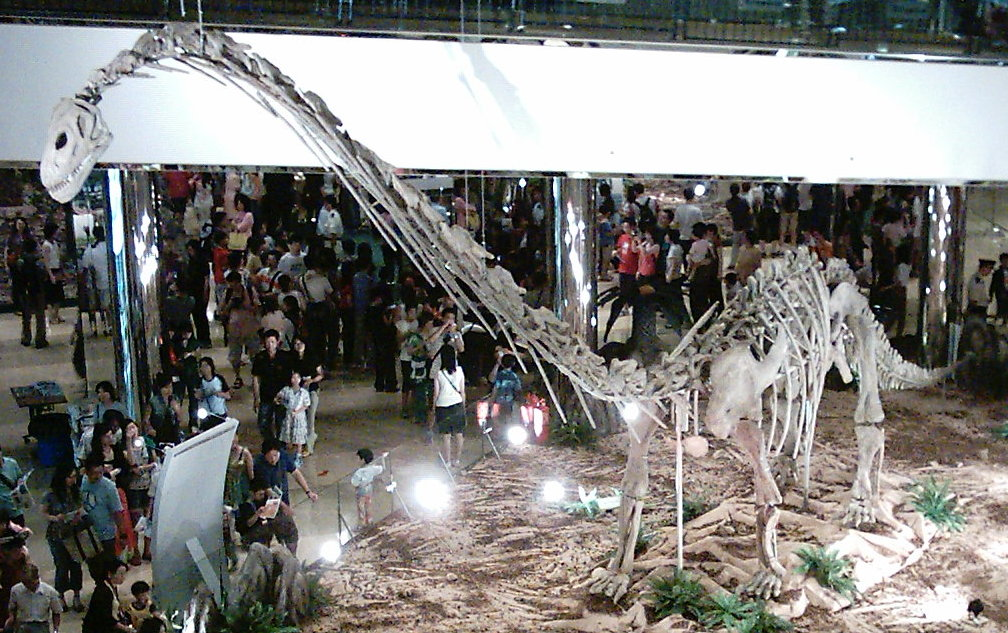
O. tianfuensis mount on display in Hong Kong

It was once classified as a member of the family Cetiosauridae, which had long been a wastebasket taxon. The species O. fuxiensis is sometimes confused with Zigongosaurus, but the two are based on different material despite having the same species name.

Omeisaurus was formerly assigned to Euhelopodidae. However, it and other Jurassic sauropods from Asia formerly assigned to Euhelopodidae are now placed in the separate family Mamenchisauridae, which is more basal in Sauropoda. In 2021, John D'Angelo determined that all Omeisaurus species, besides O. maoianus, were valid and likely members of the same genus, with O. junghsiensis as the most basal species.

The cladogram from Tan et al., 2020 below shows a possible phylogenetic position:

- Sauropoda
  - Plateosaurus
  - - Lessemsaurus
    - - Gongxianosaurus
      - Amygdalodon
      - - Vulcanodon
        - Isanosaurus
        - Sauropoda
          - Vulcanodon
          - Tazoudasaurus
          - - Cetiosaurus
            - Eusauropoda
              - Patagosaurus
              - Mamenchisauridae
                - Omeisaurus
                - - Mamenchisaurus
                  - Yuanmousaurus
              - - Turiasaurus
                - Neosauropoda

== Paleoecology ==
Omeisaurus lived in dense forests. Different species of Omeisaurus sometimes shared habitats with each other (O. junghsiensis and O. tianfuensis, for example). In addition to other species of Omeisaurus, Shunosaurus and Datousaurus are also known from the Xiashaximiao Formation, while Mamenchisaurus is present in the Shangshaximiao Formation. Yangchuanosaurus is a large theropod from the Shangshaximiao, and it probably preyed on sauropods. The smaller Xuanhanosaurus was also present. In the Xiashaximiao, another theropod, Gasosaurus, was also present, as was the herbivorous stegosaur Huayangosaurus. The latter probably did not compete with sauropods for food.
