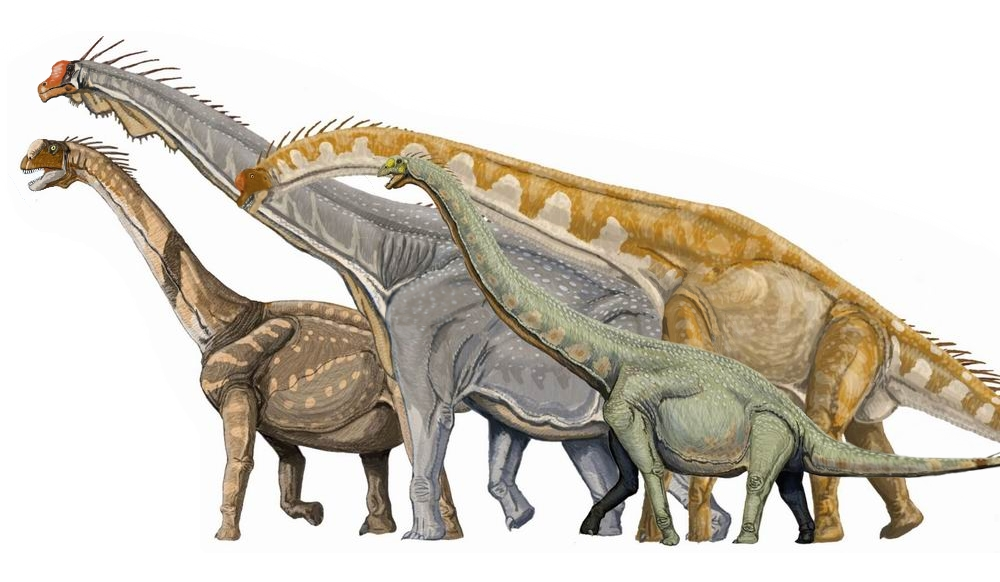
- Several macronarian sauropods

Scientific classification
- Kingdom: Animalia
- Phylum: Chordata
- Clade: Dinosauria
- Clade: Saurischia
- Clade: †Sauropodomorpha
- Clade: †Sauropoda
- Clade: †Eusauropoda
- Clade: †Neosauropoda; Bonaparte, 1986

Subgroups
- †Bothriospondylus; †Ultrasaurus; †Diplodocoidea; †Macronaria

= Neosauropoda =

Neosauropods Temporal range: Early Jurassic - Late Cretaceous, 174–66 Ma

Extinct clade of dinosaurs

Neosauropoda is a clade within Dinosauria, coined in 1986 by Argentine paleontologist José Bonaparte and currently described as Saltasaurus loricatus, Diplodocus longus, and all animals directly descended from their most recent common ancestor. The group is composed of two subgroups: Diplodocoidea and Macronaria. Arising in the early Jurassic and persisting until the Cretaceous–Paleogene extinction event, Neosauropoda contains the majority of sauropod genera, including genera such as Apatosaurus, Brachiosaurus, and Diplodocus. It also includes giants such as Argentinosaurus, Patagotitan and Sauroposeidon, and its members remain the largest land animals ever to have lived.

When Bonaparte coined the term Neosauropoda in 1986, he described the clade as comprising "end-Jurassic" sauropods. While Neosauropoda does appear to have originated at the end of the Jurassic period, it also includes members throughout the Cretaceous. Neosauropoda is currently delineated by specific shared, derived characteristics rather than the time period in which its members lived. The group was further refined by Upchurch, Sereno, and Wilson, who have identified thirteen synapomorphies shared among neosauropods. As Neosauropoda is a subgroup of Sauropoda, all members also display basic sauropod traits such as large size, long necks, and columnar legs.

== History of discovery ==
Paleontologist Richard Owen named the first sauropod, Cetiosaurus, in 1841. Due to the fragmentary evidence, he originally believed it to be a type of massive crocodile. Cetiosaurus has at times been classified as a basal member of Neosauropoda, which would make it the first member of this group discovered. Most current research, however, places Cetiosaurus outside Neosauropoda as a sister taxon. The first dinosaurs discovered which are conclusively known to fall within Neosauropoda were Apatosaurus and Camarasaurus, both found in North America in 1877, and Titanosaurus discovered the same year in India. There were other sauropods besides Cetiosaurus which were described before the 1870s, but most were known from only very fragmentary material and none were described in sufficient detail that they may conclusively be classified as neosauropods. A great number of neosauropod skeletons were unearthed in western North America during the late nineteenth and early twentieth centuries, primarily Apatosaurus, Camarasaurus, and Diplodocus.

== Evolution ==
Sauropodomorpha, of which Neosauropoda is a subclade, first arose in the late Triassic. Around 230 million years ago, animals such as Eoraptor, the most basal known member of Dinosauria and also Saurischia, already displayed certain features of the Sauropod group. These derived characters began to distinguish them from Theropoda. There were several major trends in the evolution of sauropodomorphs, most notably increased size and elongated necks, both of which would reach their culmination in neosauropods. Basal members of Sauropodomorpha are often collectively termed prosauropods, although this is likely a paraphyletic group, the exact phylogeny of which has not been conclusively determined. True sauropods appear to have developed in the Upper Triassic, with trackways from a basal member known as the ichnogenus Tetrasauropus being dated to 210 million years ago. At this point, the forelimbs had lengthened to at least 70% of the length of the hindlimbs and the animals moved from a facultatively bipedal to a quadrupedal posture. The limbs also rotated directly under the body, in order to better support the weight of the steadily increasing body size. During the Middle Jurassic, sauropods began to display increased neck length and more specialized dentition. They also developed a digitigrade posture in the hindlimbs, in which the heel and proximal metatarsals were raised completely off the ground. The foot also became more spread out, with the ends of the metatarsals no longer in contact with each other. These developments have been used to distinguish a new clade among sauropods, termed Eusauropoda.

Neosauropoda diverged from the rest of Eusauropoda in the Early Jurassic and quickly became the dominant group of large herbivores. The earliest known neosauropod is Lingwulong, a dicraeosaurid from the late Early Jurassic or early Middle Jurassic of China. Diplodocid and brachiosaurid members of the group composed the greater portion of neosauropods during the Jurassic, but they began to be replaced by titanosaurs in most regions through the Cretaceous period. By the late Cretaceous, titanosaurs were the dominant group of neosauropods, especially on the southern continents. In North America and Asia, much of their role as large herbivores had been supplanted by hadrosaurs and ceratopsians, although they remained in smaller numbers all the way until the Cretaceous-Paleogene extinction.

== Description ==
In addition to the basic features of sauropods in general and eusauropods in particular, neosauropods share certain derived features, which have been used to distinguish them as a cohesive group. In their 1998 paper, Sereno and Wilson identified thirteen characteristics that distinguish neosauropods from more basal sauropods (described below).

=== Skull ===
Neosauropods display a large opening in the skull located ventral to the antorbital fenestra, known as the preantorbital fenestra. This opening is differentially shaped among various species of neosauropods, and it has been proposed that the preanorbital fenestra is reduced or closes up completely in adult Camarasaurus, but is otherwise ubiquitous among neosauropods. The ventral process of the postorbital bone is broader when viewed from the anterior when compared to the width when viewed from the lateral side. Neosauropods lack a point of contact between the jugal bone and the ectopterygoid arch. Instead, the ecterpteryoid arch abuts the maxilla, anterior to the jugal. The external mandibular fenestra, present in prosauropods and some basal sauropods, is entirely closed.

=== Dentition ===
Neosauropods lack denticles on the majority of their teeth. In some species, including Camarasaurus and Brachiosaurus, they are retained on the most posterior teeth, but most advanced forms have lost them entirely. Certain members of the subgroup Titanosauria have ridges along their posterior teeth, but these are not large enough to be considered denticles of a form similar to those found in more basal sauropods.

=== Manus ===
The number of carpal bones in neosauropods is reduced to two or fewer. This continues a trend of successive carpal loss seen in the evolutionary record. Early dinosaurs such as Eoraptor tend to have four distal carpals. In prosauropods, this is reduced to three and the proximal carpals are usually lost or shrink in size. Basal sauropods also tend to have three carpal bones, but they are more block-like than in earlier forms. Neosauropods further reduce this number to two, and in some cases even fewer.

The metacarpals of neosauropods are bound together, allowing a digitigrade posture with the manus raised up off the ground. Prosauropods and basal sauropods have metacarpals which are articulated at the base, but this is further developed in neosauropods such that the articulation continues down the shafts. The ends of the metacarpals also form a tight arch with wedge-shaped shafts fitting closely together.

=== Tibia ===
The tibia of neosauropods has a subcircular proximal end. The transverse and anteroposterior dimensions of the proximal end are also equal or nearly so in neosauropods, whereas the transverse dimension of the tibia is always shorter than the anteroposterior dimension in prosauropods, theropods, and those basal sauropods for which evidence is available.

=== Ankle ===
The astragalus displays two unique features in neosauropods. When viewed from the proximal side, the ascending process extends to the posterior end of the astragalus. The astragalus is also wedge shaped when viewed from the anterior side due to a reduction in the medial portion.

=== Skin ===
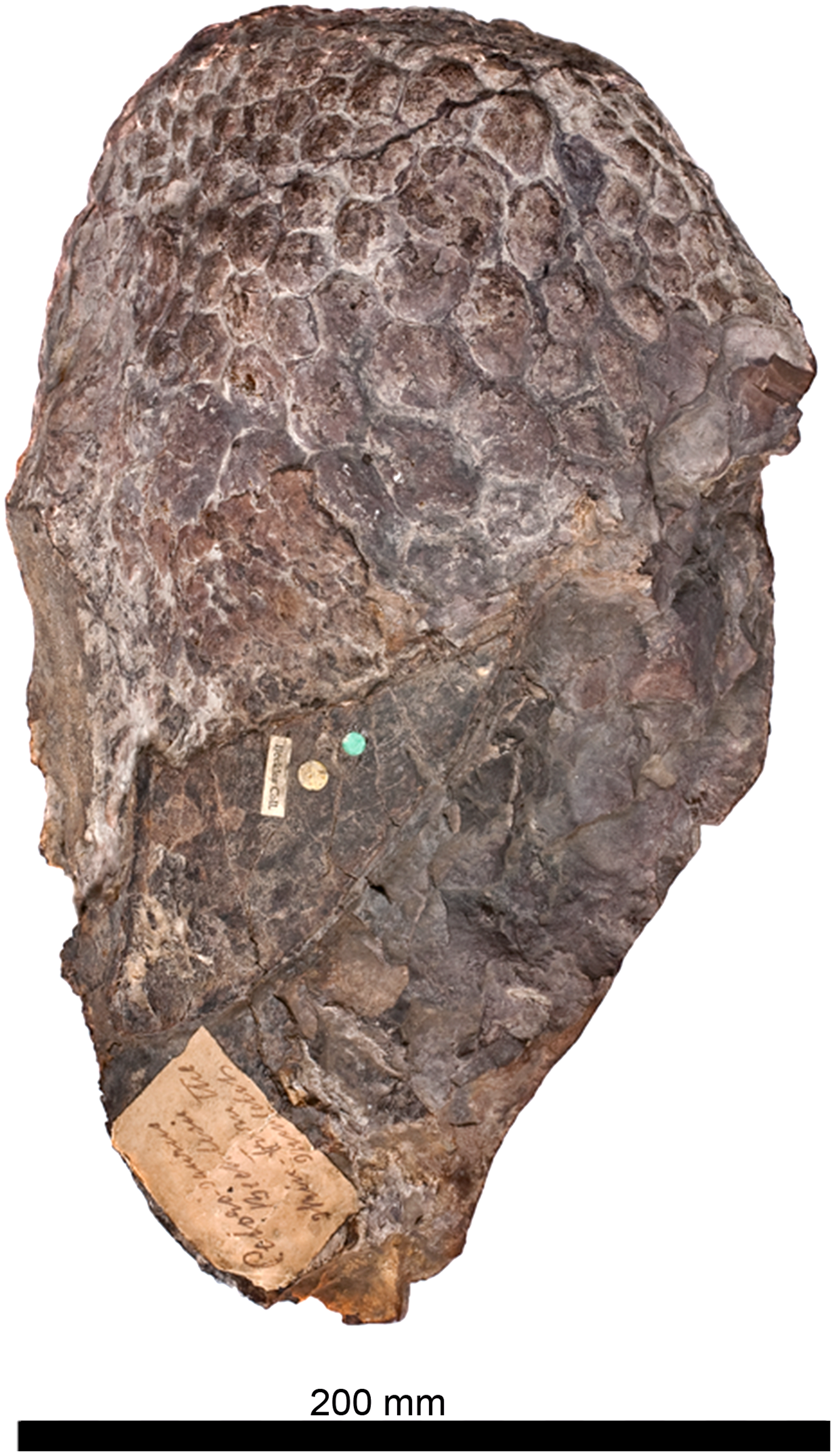
Skin impressions from Haestasaurus

Among macronarians, fossilized skin impressions are only known from Haestasaurus, Tehuelchesaurus and Saltasaurus. Haestasaurus, the first dinosaur known from skin impressions, preserved integument over a portion of the arm around the elbow joint approximately 19.5 by 21.5 cm (7.7 by 8.5 in) in area. Small, hexagonal scales are preserved, ranging from 1–2.5 cm (0.39–0.98 in) in diameter. It has been suggested that the convex surface of the scales was from the internal size of the integument, facing the bones, but this has been rejected as the convex surfaces are preserved on the outside of Saltasaurus and titanosaur embryos. Dermal impressions are more widespread in the material of Tehuelchesaurus, where they are known from the areas of the forelimb, scapula and torso. There are no bony plates or nodules, to indicate armour, but there are several types of scales. Skin associated with the scapular blade is the largest, arranged in rosettes (spiral formations) with a smooth, hexagonal shape. These largest tubercles are 2.5–3 cm (0.98–1.18 in), surrounded by smaller 1.5–2 cm (0.59–0.79 in) scales. The other type of scales are very small, only between 1 and 4 mm (0.039 and 0.157 in) in diameter, and are preserved in small fragments from the forelimb and thoracic region. These skin types are overall more similar to those found in diplodocids and Haestasaurus than in the titanosaur embryos of Auca Mahuevo. As the shape and articulation of the preserved tubercles in these basal macronarians are similar in other taxa where skin is preserved, including specimens of Brontosaurus excelsus and intermediate diplodocoids, such dermal structures are probably widespread throughout Neosauropoda.

== Classification ==
=== Phylogeny ===
José Bonaparte originally described Neosauropoda as comprising members of four sauropod groups: Dicraeosauridae, Diplodocidae, Camarasauridae, and Brachiosauridae.

Upchurch's 1995 paper on sauropod phylogeny proposed the current definition for Diplodocoidea, which was then classified as a subgroup of Titanosauridae. Cetiosaurus was linked to Neosauropoda by a trichotomy, as the genus' fragmentary and often dubious description meant that it could be placed as a sister taxon to the Titanosauridae-Diplodocoidae clade, the Brachiosauridae-Camarasauridae clade, or Neosauropoda as a whole.

From Upchurch 1995:

- Sauropoda
  - Vulcanodon
  - - Barapasaurus
    - Eusauropoda
      - Euhelopodidae
        - Shunosaurus
        - - Omeisaurus
          - - Mamenchisaurus
            - Euhelopus
      - Cetiosaurus
      - Neosauropoda
        - - Brachiosaurus
          - Camarasauridae
            - Haplocanthosaurus
            - Camarasaurus
        - - Titanosauroidea
            - Opisthocoelicaudia
            - Titanosauridae
              - Malawisaurus
              - - Alamosaurus
                - Saltasaurus
          - Diplodocoidea
            - Nemegtosauridae
              - Nemegtosaurus
              - Quaesitosaurus
            - - Dicraeosauridae
                - Dicraeosaurus
                - Amargasaurus
              - Diplodocidae
                - Apatosaurus
                - - Diplodocus
                  - Barosaurus lentus

In 1998, Sereno and Wilson published a cladistic analysis of the sauropod family which proposed Macronaria as a new taxon containing Camarasaurus, Haplocanthosaurus, and Titanosauriformes. Titanosauriformes was considered to include Brachiosaurus, Saltasaurus, and all descendants of their most recent common ancestor. This represented a significant deviation from Upchurch's 1995 phylogeny as well as much of the traditional understanding of neosauropod taxonomy. Conventional cladistics had long considered titanosaurs and diplodocoids to be more closely related, with brachiosaurids and camarasaurids together forming a sister taxon.

From Sereno and Wilson 1998:

- Sauropoda
  - Vulcanodon
  - Eusauropoda
    - Shunosaurus
    - - Barapasaurus
      - - Omeisaurus
        - Neosauropoda
          - Diplodocoidea
          - Macronaria
            - Haplocanthosaurus
            - - Camarasaurus
              - Titanosauriformes
                - Brachiosauridae
                - Somphospondyli
                  - Euhelopus
                  - Titanosauria

=== Subgroups ===
Neosauropoda is divided into two major subgroups: Macronaria and Diplodocoidea. These taxa are differentiated on the basis of several morphological features.

From Upchurch et al. 2004:

- Neosauropoda
  - Diplodocoidea
    - Rebbachisauridae
    - Dicraeosauridae
    - Diplodocidae
  - Macronaria
    - Camarasauromorpha
      - Brachiosauridae
      - Titanosauroidea
        - Titanosauria
          - Saltasauridae

==== Macronaria ====
Macronaria is defined as all neosauropods more closely related to Saltasaurus loricatus than Diplodocus longus. This classification was introduced by Wilson and Sereno in 1998. Macronaria comes from the Latin for "large nose," referring to the large external naris. The subgroup Titanosauriformes comprises all sauropods descended from the common ancestor of Brachiosaurus and Saltasaurus. Macronaria is an exceedingly diverse clade, with members ranging in size from anywhere between six and thirty-five meters in length and sporting a broad array of body shapes. Some synapomorphies which have been used to characterize macronarians include flared neural spines on the dorsal vertebrae and nearly coplanar ischial distal shafts.

==== Diplodocoidea ====
Diplodocoidea is defined as all neosauropods more closely related to Diplodocus longus than Saltasaurus loricatus. The group is named after Diplodocus, its best known member. Other prominent dinosaurs contained in this clade include Apatosaurus, Supersaurus, and Brontosaurus. Diplodocoids are distinguished by a unique head shape, which displays certain highly derived features when compared to other sauropods. The teeth are located entirely anterior to the antorbital fenestra and the snout is especially broad. In some rebbachisaurids, this is taken to such an extreme that the teeth are packed into a row along the transverse portion of the jaw. Several unique features are also noted in the tails of certain diplodocoids. Among the diplodocids, there was a marked increase in the number of caudal vertebrae. Most sauropods have between forty and fifty caudal vertebrae, but in diplodocids this number jumps to eighty or more. In addition, the most distal vertebrae develop a biconvex shape and together form a long, bony rod at the end of the tail, often referred to as a "whiplash tail." Increased caudal count and a whiplash tail may be features shared by all members of the Diplodocoid group, but, due to a scarcity of evidence, this has yet to be proven.
