= Tongnanlong =

Tongnanlong Temporal range: ?Late Jurassic, ~145? Ma

Scientific classification
- Kingdom: Animalia
- Phylum: Chordata
- Class: Reptilia
- Clade: Dinosauria
- Clade: Saurischia
- Clade: †Sauropodomorpha
- Clade: †Sauropoda
- Family: †Mamenchisauridae
- Genus: †Tongnanlong; Wei et al., 2025
- Species: †T. zhimingi

Binomial name
- †Tongnanlong zhimingi Wei et al., 2025

Genus of mamenchisaurid sauropod

Tongnanlong (meaning "Tongnan District dragon") is a genus of mamenchisaurid dinosaur from the Late Jurassic Suining Formation of Chongqing, China. The type species is Tongnanlong zhimingi.

== Discovery and naming ==
The Tongnanlong holotype specimen, TNM 0254, consists of three dorsal and six caudal vertebrae, left shoulder girdle (scapula and coracoid) and hindlimb elements (partial tibia, fibula, three metatarsals, and two unguals). It was discovered in 1998 during construction of a building along Dafo Street.

It was described as a new genus and species of dinosaur in 2025. The generic name, Tongnanlong, combines a reference to Tongnan District, Chongqing, where it was found, with the Chinese word long, meaning "dragon". The specific name, zhimingi, refers to prominent Chinese paleontologist Dong Zhiming.

== Description ==
Tongnanlong is estimated as being up to 25–26 m (82–85 ft) long, making it one of the largest mamenchisaurids.

== Classification ==
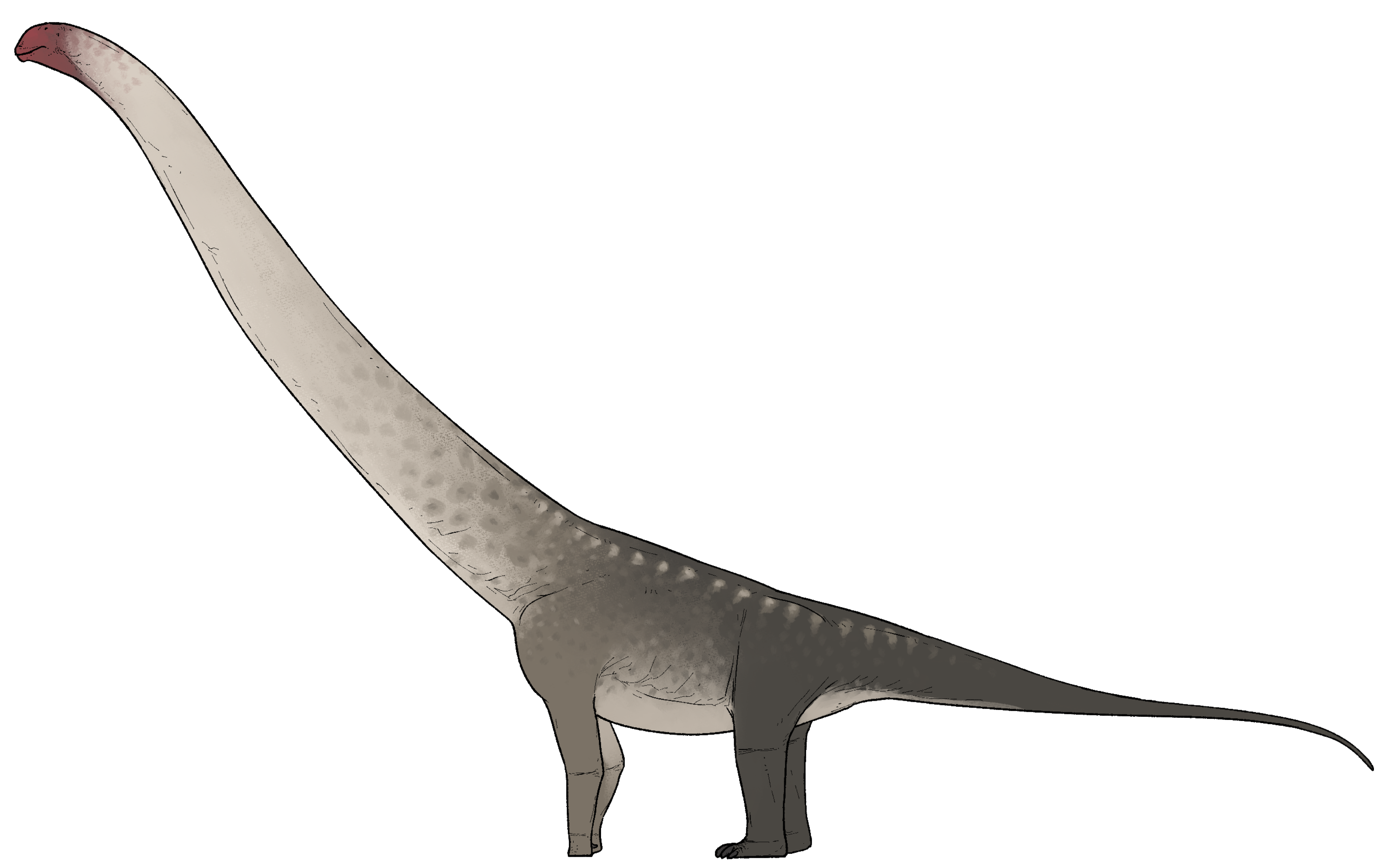
Speculative life restoration

Wei et al. (2025) inserted Tongnanlong into the phylogenetic analysis previously used in the description of Jingiella. It placed Tongnanlong as a derived member of the Mamenchisauridae close to Mamenchisaurus. A cladogram adapted from their analysis is shown below:

- Mamenchisauridae
  - Spinophorosaurus
  - - Analong
    - - - Omeisaurus tianfuensis
        - Omeisaurus puxiani
      - - Rhoetosaurus
        - - Yuanmousaurus
          - - Jingiella
            - - Tongnanlong
              - - Mamenchisaurus youngi
                - Chuanjiesaurus

== Paleoenvironment ==
Other animals from the Suining Formation include fellow mamenchisaurid dinosaurs Qijianglong guokr and Mamenchisaurus anyuensis, the lungfish Ceratodus szechuanensis, and the turtle Plesiochelys tatsuensis.
