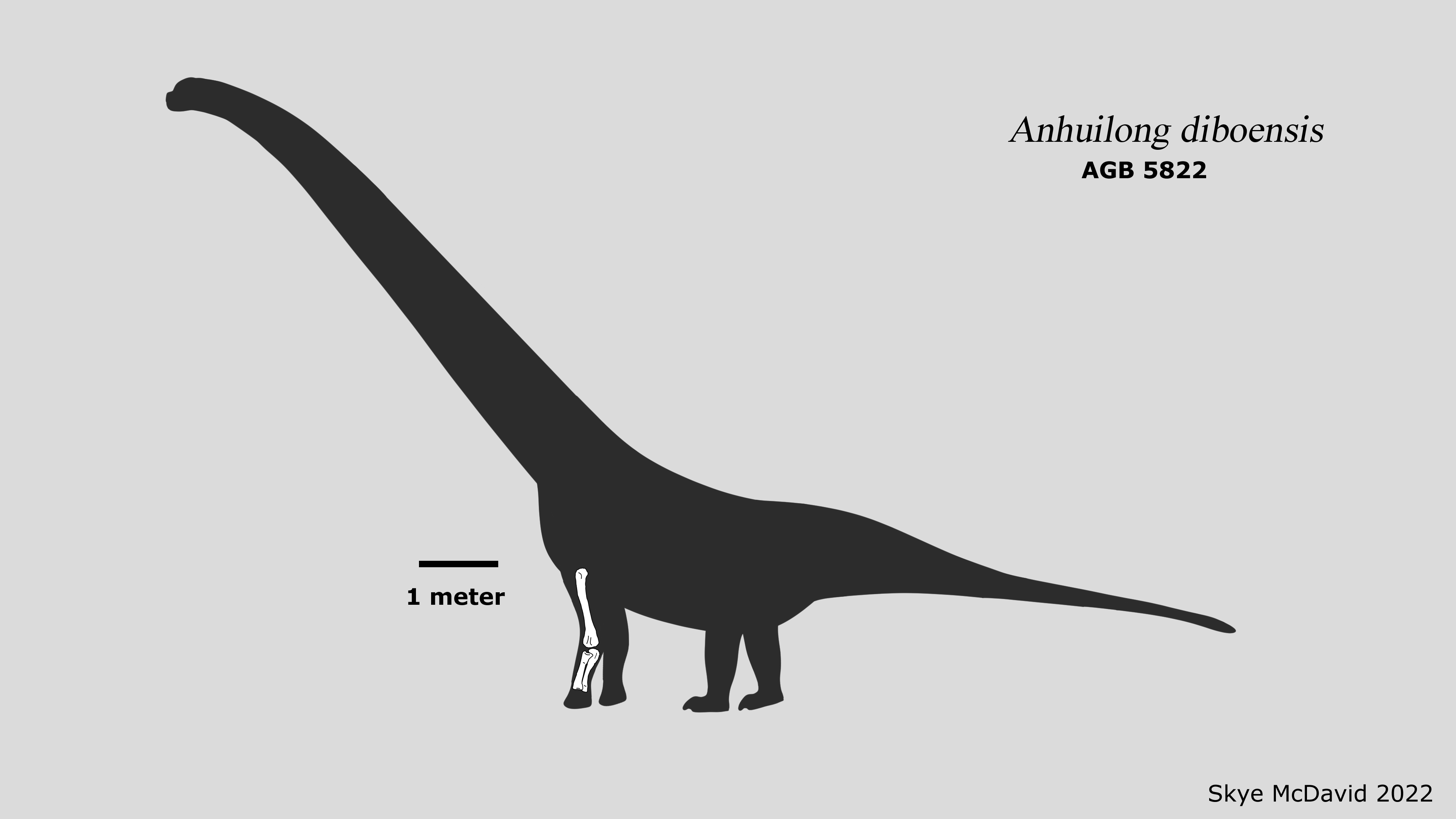
- Skeletal diagram

Scientific classification
- Domain: Eukaryota
- Kingdom: Animalia
- Phylum: Chordata
- Clade: Dinosauria
- Clade: Saurischia
- Clade: †Sauropodomorpha
- Clade: †Sauropoda
- Family: †Mamenchisauridae
- Genus: †Anhuilong; Ren et al., 2020

Type species
- †Anhuilong diboensis Ren et al, 2020

= Anhuilong =

Anhuilong Temporal range: Middle Jurassic, 174–162 Ma

Extinct genus of dinosaurs

Anhuilong (meaning "Anhui dragon") is a genus of mamenchisaurid dinosaur known from the Hongqin Formation of Anhui province, China. The genus contains a single species, Anhuilong diboensis.

== Discovery and naming ==
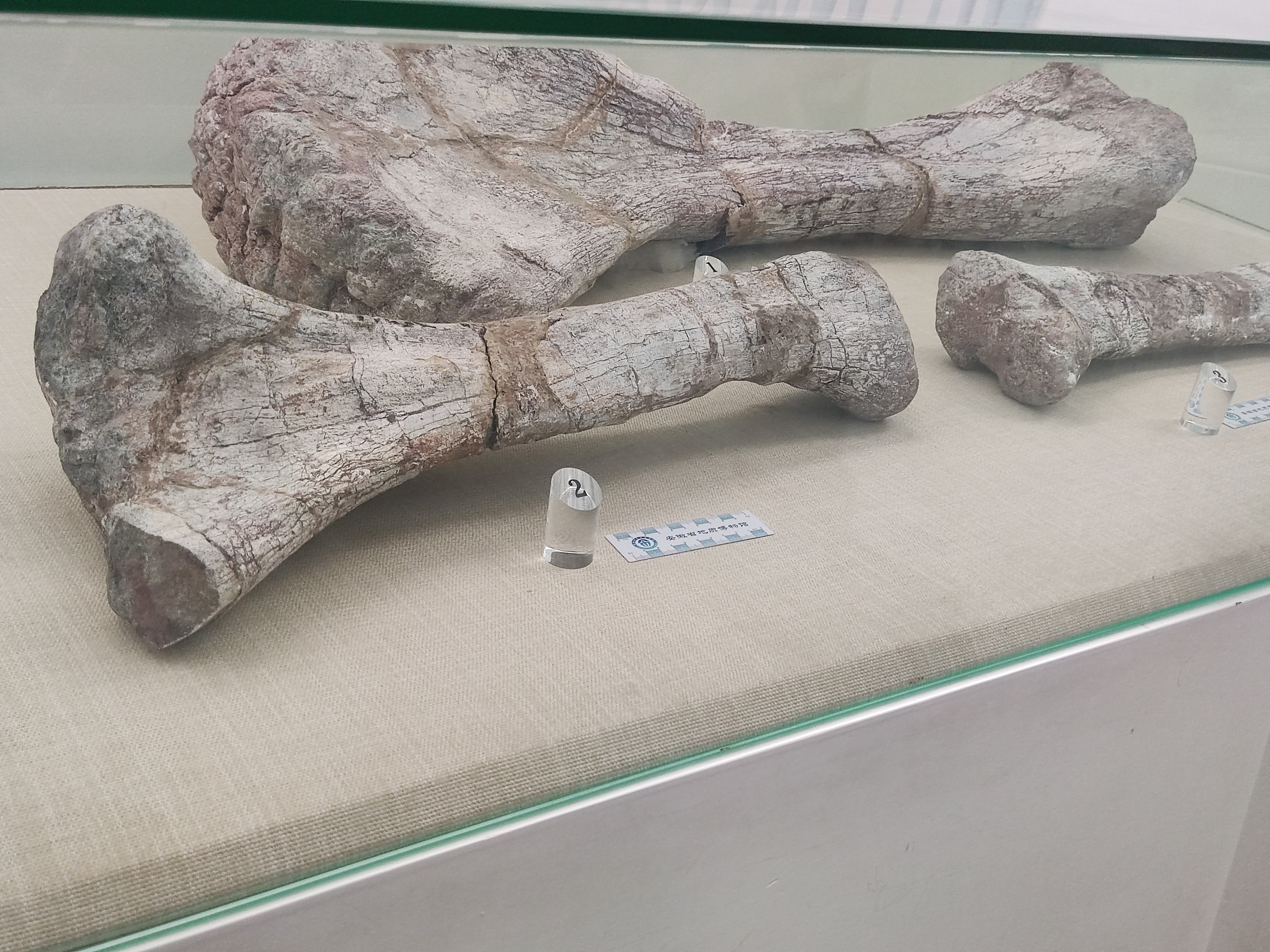
Holotype on display at Anhui Geological Museum in Hefei

Anhuilong is known from the holotype AGB 5822, a forelimb consisting of a left humerus, ulna, and radius. It is distinguished by the following combination of features: low ratios of the average of the greatest widths of the proximal end, mid-shaft and distal end of the humerus/length of the humerus, total length of ulna to humerus and total length of radius to humerus; the lateral edge of the deltopectoral crest directs caudolaterally, the lateral accessory condyle on the craniodistal edge of humerus is more robust than the medial one, and the cross-sectional shape of the ulna at mid-shaft is elliptical with highest ratio of transverse to craniocaudal diameter among mamenchisaurids.

== Phylogeny ==
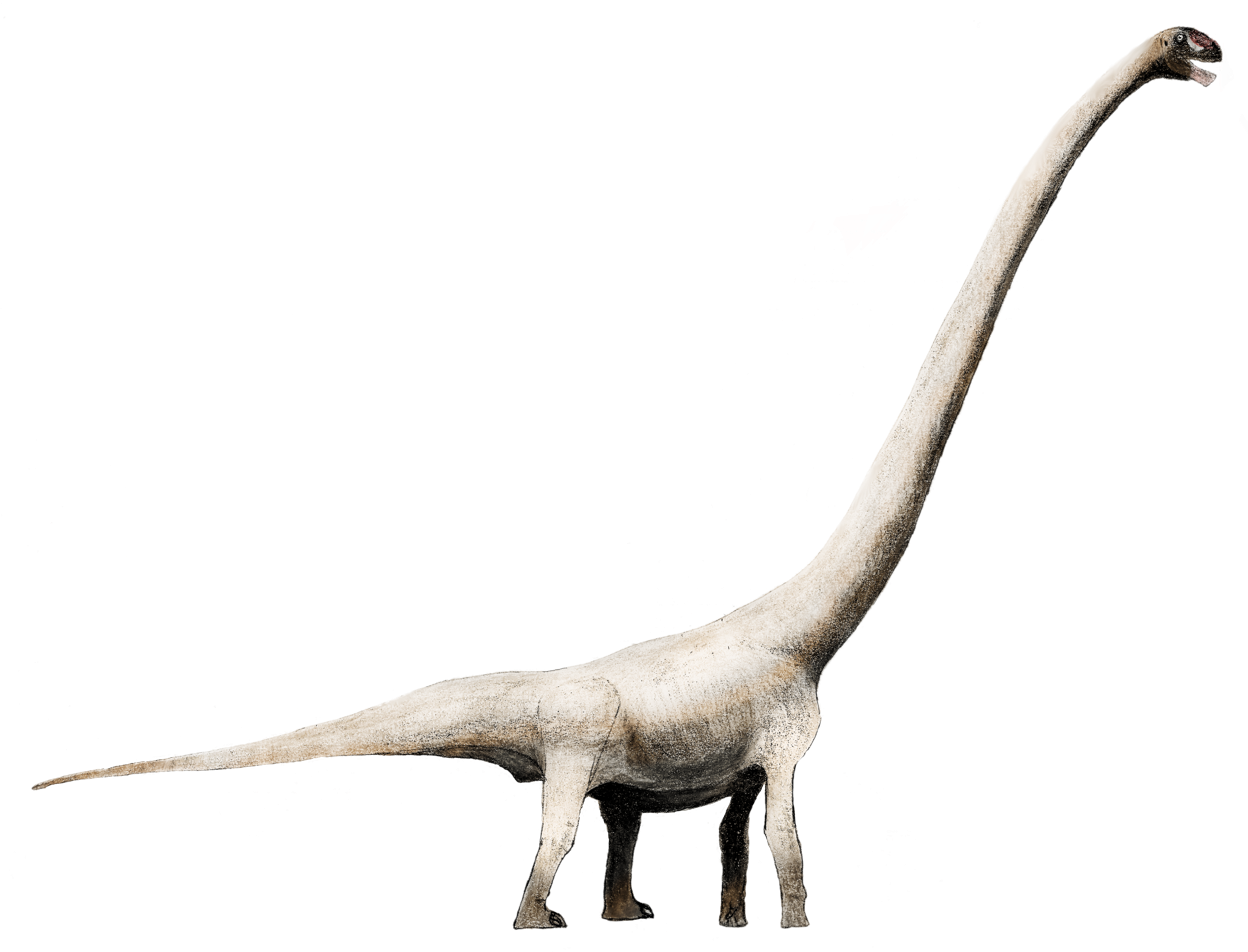
Speculative life restoration

Ren et al. (2020) (Note: Although the name first appeared online in 2018, it was only validly published in 2020.) recovered Anhuilong as the sister taxon of Huangshanlong, with the closest relative of this clade being Omeisaurus tianfuensis. The results of their phylogenetic analysis are shown in the cladogram below:

- Eusauropoda
  - Shunosaurus
  - - Mamenchisauridae
      - - Omeisaurus tianfuensis
        - - Anhuilong
          - Huangshanlong
      - - Qijianglong
        - Chuanjiesaurus
        - - Mamenchisaurus sinocanadorum
          - Mamenchisaurus youngi
          - Mamenchisaurus hochuanensis
          - Mamenchisaurus anyuensis
          - Mamenchisaurus constructus
          - Yuanmousaurus
          - "Omeisaurus maoianus"
    - - Barapasaurus
      - - - Spinophorosaurus
          - Nebulasaurus
        - - Patagosaurus
          - - - Turiasaurus
              - Atlasaurus
              - Losillasaurus
            - - Haplocanthosaurus
              - Neosauropoda
