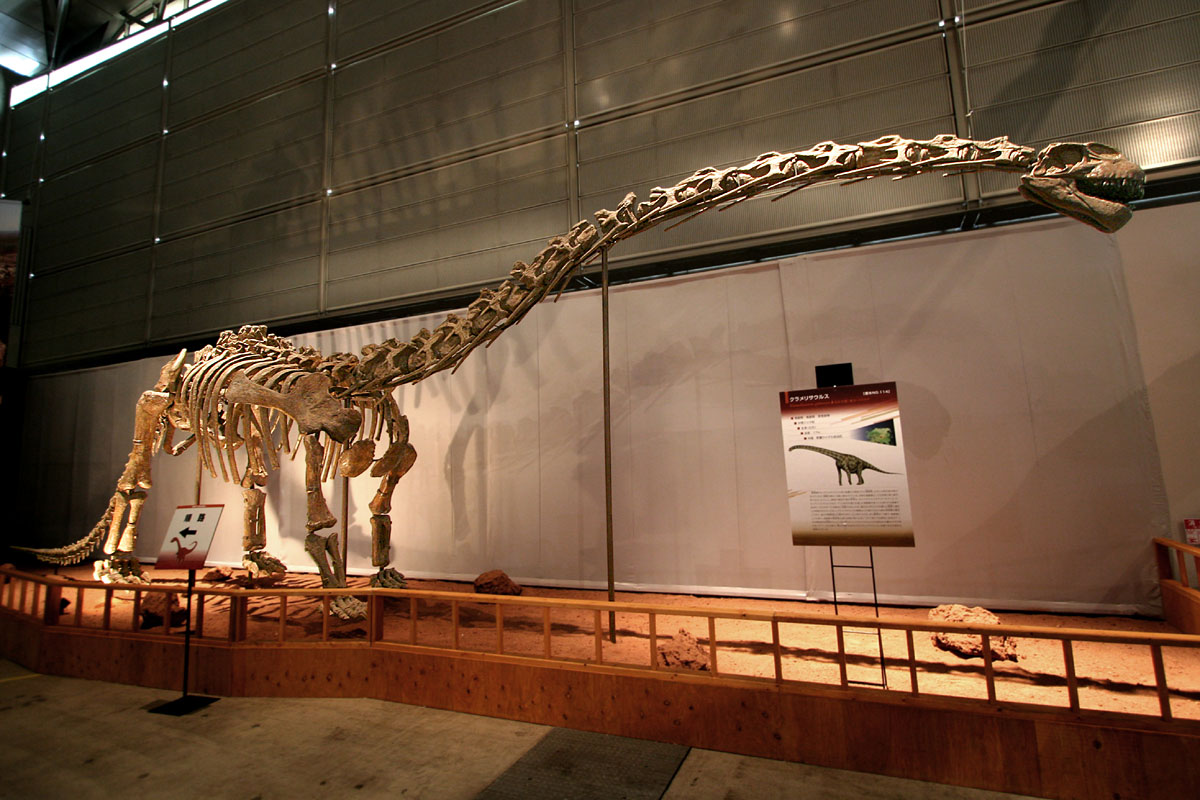
- Skeleton cast

Scientific classification
- Kingdom: Animalia
- Phylum: Chordata
- Class: Reptilia
- Clade: Dinosauria
- Clade: Saurischia
- Clade: †Sauropodomorpha
- Clade: †Sauropoda
- Family: †Mamenchisauridae
- Genus: †Klamelisaurus; Zhao, 1993
- Species: †K. gobiensis

Binomial name
- †Klamelisaurus gobiensis Zhao, 1993

= Klamelisaurus =

Klamelisaurus Temporal range: Callovian

Extinct genus of dinosaurs

Klamelisaurus (meaning "Kelameili Mountains lizard") is a genus of herbivorous sauropod dinosaur from the Middle Jurassic Shishugou Formation of China. The type species is Klamelisaurus gobiensis, which was named by Zhao Xijin in 1993, based on a partial skeleton discovered in 1982 near the abandoned town of Jiangjunmiao. Zhao described Klamelisaurus as the only member of a new subfamily, Klamelisaurinae, among the now-defunct primitive sauropod order Bothrosauropodoidea. Since Zhao's description, Klamelisaurus received limited attention from researchers until Andrew Moore and colleagues redescribed it in 2020.

A relatively large sauropod measuring approximately 13 metres (43 ft) long, with half of the length being its neck, Klamelisaurus can be distinguished from its relatives by characteristics of the vertebrae and humerus. Phylogenetic analyses have suggested that Klamelisaurus belonged to the Mamenchisauridae, a group of Middle to Late Jurassic and primarily Chinese sauropods, although its close relatives also include a mamenchisaurid from Thailand. While paleontologist Gregory S. Paul suggested that Bellusaurus, known only from juvenile specimens, was a juvenile Klamelisaurus, this proposal has been rejected based on anatomical evidence, and the fact that Bellusaurus was geologically younger.

== Discovery and naming ==
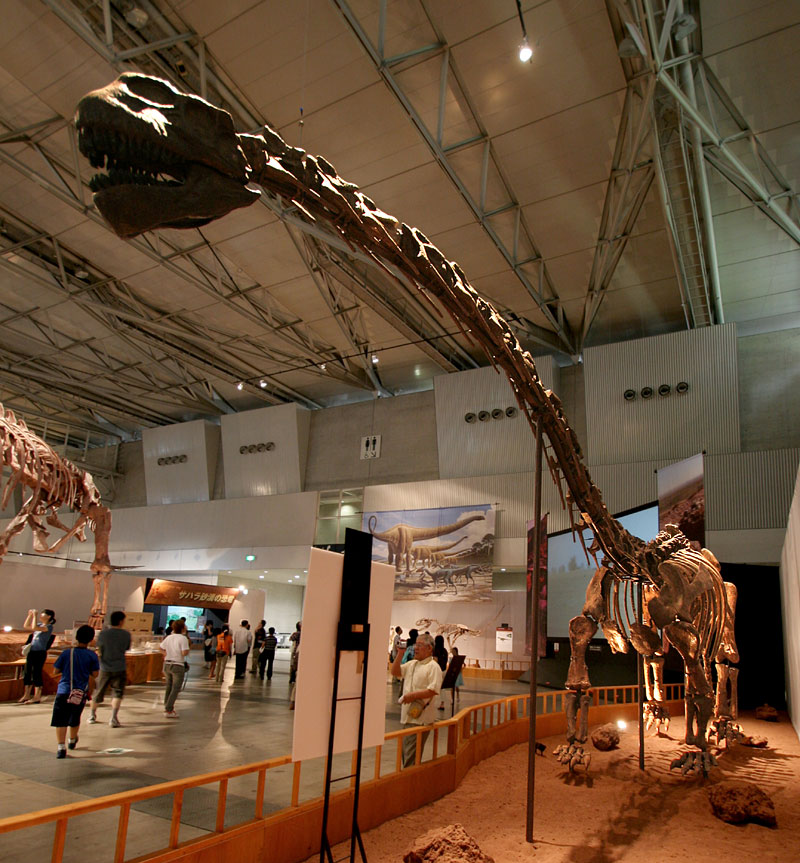
Cast of the holotype skeleton

Between 1981 and 1985, a field crew from the Institute of Vertebrate Paleontology and Paleoanthropology (IVPP) conducted excavations in the Junggar Basin of the Xinjiang Autonomous Region of China, as part of a research project titled "Evolution of the Junggar Basin and the Formation of Petroleum". The work was conducted in cooperation with the Chinese Academy of Sciences and the Xinjiang Office of Petroleum. In 1982, these excavations uncovered the skeleton of a sauropod dinosaur 35 kilometres (22 mi) north of the now-abandoned town of Jiangjunmiao, located in the eastern Junggar Basin. The skeleton was excavated and collected in 1984 by the IVPP field team.

The specimen, which was catalogued under the specimen number IVPP V9492, consists of teeth, most of the vertebral column (save for the first seven cervical vertebrae (neck vertebrae) and the end of the tail), ribs, the right shoulder girdle and arm (scapula, coracoid, humerus, ulna, radius, and phalanges), and the right hip girdle and leg (ilium, pubis, femur, tibia, fibula, and astragalus). At the time of its discovery, the specimen was already weathered. After it was transported to Beijing, with preparation and restoration work beginning in 1985, it deteriorated further due to fluctuations in temperature and humidity. Nearly all of the bones underwent reconstruction and painting, and many of them were encased in a metal armature for display. The referral of the fragmentary teeth to the specimen was unexplained, and they can no longer be located along with two ribs, two carpals of the wrist, a calcaneum of the ankle, and some bones of the tail. They also located several chevrons (from the underside of the tail), the bottom end of the left femur, and parts of the left hand that were not mentioned by Zhao.

In 1993, Xijing Zhao described IVPP V9492 as the type specimen of a new genus and species, Klamelisaurus gobiensis. Due to the condition of the specimen, he only conducted a "simple description". The generic name Klamelisaurus refers to the Kelameili Mountains to the north of Jiangjunmiao, of which "Klameli" is a variant spelling. The specific name gobiensis refers to the Gobi Desert, in which Jiangjunmiao is located. Following Zhao's description, IVPP V9492 received limited attention in the literature until it was redescribed by Andrew Moore and colleagues in 2020. They noted that the specimen's reconstruction had been altered since Zhao's description, namely by the addition of a frontward-projecting process on the 15th cervical rib and the removal of a fabricated connection to the centrum (vertebral body).

== Description ==
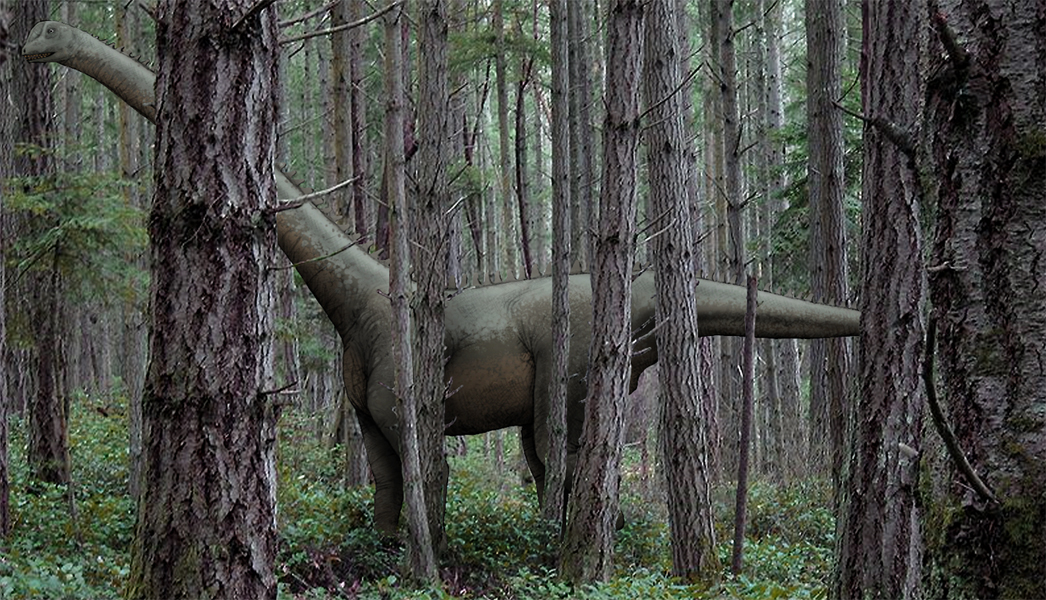
Artist impression of Klamelisaurus in a conifer forest

Klamelisaurus was described as a "relatively large" sauropod by Zhao in 1993. In 2016, American paleontologist Gregory S. Paul estimated its length at 13 metres (43 ft) in length and 6 tonnes (5.9 long tons; 6.6 short tons) in weight, albeit based on the hypothesis that Klamelisaurus represented the adult form of Bellusaurus. In 2020, Moore and colleagues listed a number of characteristics (following a 2013 study by Michael Taylor and Mathew Wedel) which identified the type specimen as an adult: the lack of unfused sutures in the vertebral centra; the fusion of the sacrals (hip vertebrae), the fusion of the cervical ribs to their corresponding centra; and the fusion of the scapula and coracoid in the shoulder.

=== Vertebrae ===
Zhao stated that the type specimen of Klamelisaurus preserved nine cervicals (neck vertebrae), out of an estimated total of sixteen with a total length of 6.5 metres (21 ft). Moore and colleagues concurred with the number of cervicals, but they noted that the tenth preserved vertebra shows characteristics of both cervicals and dorsals (back vertebrae). They estimated a total of fifteen to seventeen cervicals, based on other sauropods with similar patterns of vertebral variation, and indicated that Klamelisaurus had a shorter neck than Omeisaurus tianfuensis, Mamenchisaurus hochuanensis, and M. sinocanadorum. Zhao's original diagnosis or list of distinguishing characteristics (which have been reassessed as being widespread among sauropods) noted that the cervicals were opisthocoelous (with centra convex in front and concave behind); had centra 1.5 to 2 times the length of the dorsal centra; and had tall neural spines, which were bifid (two-pronged) at the back of the neck. Moore and colleagues noted two unique features (autapomorphies) in the cervicals. First, the spinoprezygapophyseal laminae (SPRLs), ridges of bone extending forward from the neural spines, bore irregular, plate-like extensions. Second, below the SPRLs and in front of depressions called the spinodiapophyseal fossae (SDFs), the sides of the centra bore a set of deep foramina (openings). Although these foramina were present only on the right side of the centra, Moore and colleagues considered them to be unique due to their consistency and the presence of similar structures in other sauropods.

A number of sauropods possess laminae or struts that cross the SDFs in their cervical vertebrae, linking the epipophyses projecting from the back of the vertebrae to the prezygapophyses extending from the front of the vertebrae. These include Euhelopus (where it is a distinguishing characteristic) and Nigersaurus; this structure has been named the "epipophyseal-prezygapophyseal lamina" (EPRL). Moore and colleagues considered two structures in Klamelisaurus to potentially correspond to the EPRL: extensions of the epipophyses that invade the SDFs from the rear, and isolated struts in the middle of the SDFs. Similar structures in Uberabatitan had previously been considered as evidence of a "segmented EPRL". However, for Klamelisaurus, Moore and colleagues interpreted the former to be an attachment for the intercristal muscles of the neck, based on the surface texture and comparisons with ostriches, while they considered the latter to be a pneumatic structure created by air sacs. Thus, they argued that previous literature had conflated distinct and diverse muscular and pneumatic structures as components of the EPRL.

Moore and colleagues identified twelve dorsals and six sacrals in the type specimen of Klamelisaurus. (Zhao previously identified the first sacral of Moore and colleagues as the last dorsal, giving thirteen dorsals and five sacrals.) Although sacral vertebrae are usually identified by contact with the ilium, these bones are not in association in the type specimen. Instead, Moore and colleagues noted a bridge of bone connecting the diapophysis and parapophysis (processes on the side of the vertebra), which was either fused to the lost sacral rib (as in other sauropods) or was not associated with a rib at all. Zhao's diagnosis noted that the dorsals were opisthocoelous; the dorsals had shallow pleurocoels (neurovascular openings) and simple lamination (ridging); the dorsal neural spines were low, with the first few being bifid and the last few having expanded tips; the sacral centra were fused such that their boundaries were not visible; and the first four sacral neural spines were fused. Moore and colleagues identified two unique features in the dorsals. First, the sides of some of the dorsals bore sets of three posterior centroparapophyseal laminae (PCPLs). Second, the spinodiapophyseal laminae (SPDLs) on the sides of the neural spines were bifurcated in the middle and rear dorsals, but unlike Bellusaurus the two prongs did not reach the SPRLs or the SPOLs (spinopostzygapophyseal laminae, the rear counterparts of the SPRLs).

Parts of nineteen caudals (tail vertebrae) were found by Moore and colleagues: parts of the first four caudals (labelled as caudals 1–4), five more neural spines from the front of the tail (labelled as caudals 6 and 8–11), and eleven centra from the middle of the tail (labelled as caudals 18–27 and 33). Zhao originally counted two complete caudals, ten neural spines from the front, and ten middle centra, based on which he estimated that sixty were originally present with a total length of 6.55 metres (21.5 ft). Zhao's list of characteristics indicated that the first few caudals were procoelous (with centra concave in front and convex behind), with the rest being amphicoelous (with centra concave on both ends); and the caudal neural spines were claviform (thicker at the tip) and slanted extremely to the rear. Characteristics of the caudals that differentiate Klamelisaurus from Tienshanosaurus include the procoelous front caudals, and the front edge of the tip of the neural spines being slanted to the point of reaching behind the rear edge of the processes known as postzygapophyses.

=== Limbs and limb girdles ===
In terms of limb proportions, Zhao indicated that the forelimb of Klamelisaurus was three-quarters the length of the hindlimb, and the ulna and tibia were respectively two-thirds the lengths of the humerus and femur. He considered these proportions to be distinguishing characteristics of Klamelisaurus.

According to Zhao, Klamelisaurus had a thin, elongated scapula and a slender, small coracoid (the former being 4.3 to 4.5 times the length of the latter), but Moore and colleagues did not consider his measurements of the scapula to be reliable as most of the bone was covered by plaster and paint. The acromion process, located at the outer bottom end of the scapula, was broader than in Cetiosaurus, Shunosaurus, and many early-diverging sauropodomorphs, and the top edge of the acromion was straight, not concave like Tienshanosaurus. Zhao observed that the top of the humerus was thick, and slightly curved. Unlike Bellusaurus and many neosauropods, the head of the humerus did not have an overhanging sub-circular process. Moore and colleagues noted a unique characteristic of the humerus: the front surface of the top inner end bore a depression, which was bordered by an S-shaped shelf ending in a rounded bump. Zhao n that the ulna was longer than the relatively straight radius, and he suggested that the degree of expansion of the upper ulna was unique; Moore and colleagues instead found that it was comparable to many other sauropods. Also unlike Bellusaurus, the anteromedial process at the top of the ulna had a convex (not flat) surface that sloped below the olecranon process. The bottom of the front of the radius bore a depression, which Haestasaurus also had, but was otherwise uncommon among sauropods.

Zhao's diagnosis for the hips and legs of Klamelisaurus included a robust ilium with an indistinct "laminar ridge" and a forward-projecting pubic peduncle (attachment to the pubis); a slender ischium; a robust, thin, flat, and weakly curved pubis (however, this bone appears to be reconstructed); a thick and flat femur with an indistinct head and a fourth trochanter (the attachment for the caudofemoralis muscle) located near the top of the bone; and a tibia shorter than the fibula (however, these bones are either incomplete or heavily reconstructed). Moore and colleagues noted that the anterolateral and anteromedial processes at the top of the tibia formed an acute angle in Klamelisaurus, unlike Bellusaurus where they formed an angle of 80°. They also identified a distinguishing characteristic in the first metatarsal of the (possibly right) foot: there was a flange-like ridge overhanging the inner edge of the shaft. This bone was shorter than the large and recurved claw of the third toe on the right foot. Both of these foot bones, among others, were described by Zhao as hand bones.

== Classification ==
=== Early classifications ===
In his 1993 description, Zhao placed Klamelisaurus as the only genus in a new subfamily, Klamelisaurinae, for which he also provided a diagnosis. (A number of Zhao's distinguishing characteristics listed above pertain to Klamelisaurinae instead of Klamelisaurus directly.) He considered it to be "early to middle stage sauropod" with "transitional characters". As for the higher-level taxonomy of Klamelisaurus, the sauropod classification used by Zhao was an antiquated scheme attributed by Zhao to a 1958 publication by C. C. Young (although in 1983 he had attributed it to a 1961 publication by Oskar Kuhn): the Sauropoda was divided into the primitive Bothrosauropodoidea (misspelt as "Bothrosauropodea" by Zhao) and the derived ("advanced") Homalosauropodoidea (misspelt as "Homolosauropodoidea" and "Homolosauropodea" by Zhao), which could be distinguished based on dental and vertebral characteristics. He assigned Klamelisaurus to the former.

Within the "early stage" Bothrosauropodoidea, Zhao considered Klamelisaurus to be part of the Brachiosauridae, which by his definition included the modern Brachiosauridae alongside Cetiosauridae (as "Cetiosaurinae"), Camarasaurinae, and Euhelopodidae (as "Euhelopodinae"). Among these groups, he considered Klamelisaurus to be closest to Camarasaurinae due to the cervicals being longer than the dorsals; the bifid cervical and dorsal neural spines; the "well-developed" pleurocoels; the relatively short forelimb; and the fibula-femur length ratio. However, he noted that the combination of more than twelve cervicals, thirteen dorsals, five sacrals with four fused, and other characteristics in Klamelisaurus was distinct from these other groups, warranting the creation of a new subfamily.

Subsequent literature has not used Zhao's taxonomy for Klamelisaurus. In the 2004 second edition of The Dinosauria, Paul Upchurch, Paul Barrett, and Peter Dodson considered Klamelisaurus to be a sauropod of uncertain phylogenetic relationships (incertae sedis), and suggested that it can be distinguished by fusion of the last three cervical neural spines. (However, in 2020, Moore and colleagues noted that it did not possess this trait.) Based on the broad, spatula-like teeth (considered by Moore and colleagues to be of questionable affiliation), the estimated presence of sixteen cervicals, the presence of five sacrals, and the forked chevrons, Upchurch and colleagues noted a resemblance between Klamelisaurus and Omeisaurus. Thus, they suggested that it could be a non-neosauropod eusauropod.

=== Redescription ===
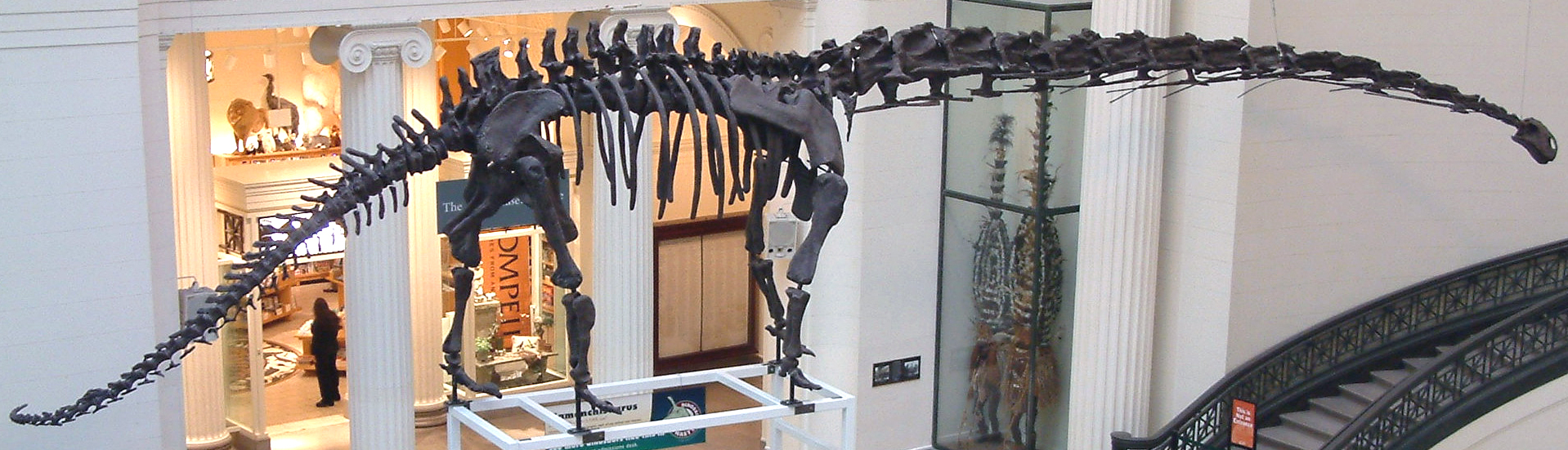
Phylogenetic analysis suggests that Klamelisaurus was closely related to Mamenchisaurus hocuanensis

In their 2020 redescription of Klamelisaurus, Moore and colleagues provided the first phylogenetic analysis of its relationships. They added Klamelisaurus to two different datasets: one used by José Carballido and colleagues in their 2015 description of Padillasaurus, and one used by Bernardo Gonzàlez Riga and colleagues in their 2018 redescription of Mendozasaurus. To both, they added various members of the Mamenchisauridae — a group that many Middle-to-Late Jurassic Chinese sauropods have been assigned to. Since previous analyses failed to find Mamenchisaurus and Omeisaurus species as unified (monophyletic) groups, their analysis focused on resolving the relationships of individual specimens rather than genera. They conducted three variants of each analysis: a parsimony-based analysis, an implied-weights analysis to optimize for homologous (i.e., derived from a shared ancestor) features, and a Bayesian (likelihood-based) analysis to account for the age of each specimen.

All of their analyses recovered Klamelisaurus as part of a group of Middle-to-Late Jurassic sauropods that also included Mamenchisaurus, Chuanjiesaurus, Analong (as a referred specimen of Chuanjiesaurus), Wamweracaudia, Qijianglong, a specimen from Thailand (the Phu Kradung taxon), and a specimen from Xinjiang (the Shishugou cervicodorsal vertebrae). They termed these the "core Mamenchisaurus-like taxa". The parsimony-based and implied-weights analyses for the Carballido dataset found Klamelisaurus close to the Phu Kradung and Shishugou specimens, as well as M. youngi; the Bayesian analysis found M. constructus and M. hochuanensis closer than the latter two. The parsimony-based analysis for the Gonzàlez Riga dataset found Klamelisaurus close to M. youngi, M. hochuanensis, and Qijianglong; and the implied-weights and Bayesian analyses found it close to the Phu Kradung and Shishugou specimens, with the latter also including Chuanjiesaurus, M. constructus, and Euhelopus.

Nearly all of their analyses found the "core Mamenchisaurus-like taxa" to be closely related to Euhelopus, Daxiatitan, and Dongbeititan, traditionally considered part of the more derived Macronaria. They recovered this wider group — which they termed the Euhelopodidae — outside of the Neosauropoda; the implied-weights analysis on the Carballido dataset placed it as an early-diverging macronarian lineage, also including Bellusaurus, while the implied-weights analysis on the Gonzàlez Riga dataset found Euhelopus among macronarians as a somphospondyl (in which case they called the group Mamenchisauridae). For all analyses, the support (or "likelihood") values for groupings within the Euhelopodidae were low. They considered the results of the implied-weights and Bayesian analyses of the Gonzàlez Riga dataset to be most favorable; still, the results of the two analyses differed profoundly. Thus, they highlighted a need for further redescriptions and revisions of these sauropods (particularly Mamenchisaurus and Omeisaurus) as well as the development of more distinguishing characteristics.

Below, two phylogenetic trees show the internal relationships of Euhelopodidae/Mamenchisauridae in the two analyses Moore and colleagues deemed most favorable, the implied-weights and Bayesian analyses of the Gonzàlez Riga dataset.

Topology A: Implied-weights analysis, Gonzàlez Riga dataset

- Mamenchisauridae
  - Tienshanosaurus chitaiensis
  - - Omeisaurus junghsiensis
    - Core Mamenchisaurus‑like taxa
      - Wamweracaudia keranjei
      - - - Qijianglong guokr
          - Mamenchisaurus sinocanadorum
        - - - Chuanjiesaurus anaensis
            - Analong chuanjieensis
          - - Mamenchisaurus hochuanensis (holotype)
            - Mamenchisaurus hochuanensis (referred)
            - - Mamenchisaurus youngi
              - - Shishugou cervicodorsals
                - - Phu Kradung taxon
                  - Klamelisaurus gobiensis

Topology B: Time-calibrated Bayesian analysis, Gonzàlez Riga dataset

- Euhelopodidae
  - - Omeisaurus junghsiensis
    - - Cetiosauriscus stewarti
      - - Omeisaurus maoianus
        - Omeisaurus tianfuensis
  - - Tienshanosaurus chitaiensis
    - Core Mamenchisaurus‑like taxa
      - - Chuanjiesaurus anaensis
        - - Analong chuanjieensis
          - - Qijianglong guokr
            - - Shishugou cervicodorsals
              - Mamenchisaurus sinocanadorum
      - - - - Mamenchisaurus hochuanensis (holotype)
            - Mamenchisaurus constructus
          - - Phu Kradung taxon
            - Klamelisaurus gobiensis
        - - Mamenchisaurus hochuanensis (referred)
          - Mamenchisaurus youngi
          - - Wamweracaudia keranjei
            - - - Xianshanosaurus shijiagouensis
                - Daxiatitan binglingi
              - - Euhelopus zdanskyi
                - Dongbeititan dongi

=== Suggested synonymy with Bellusaurus ===
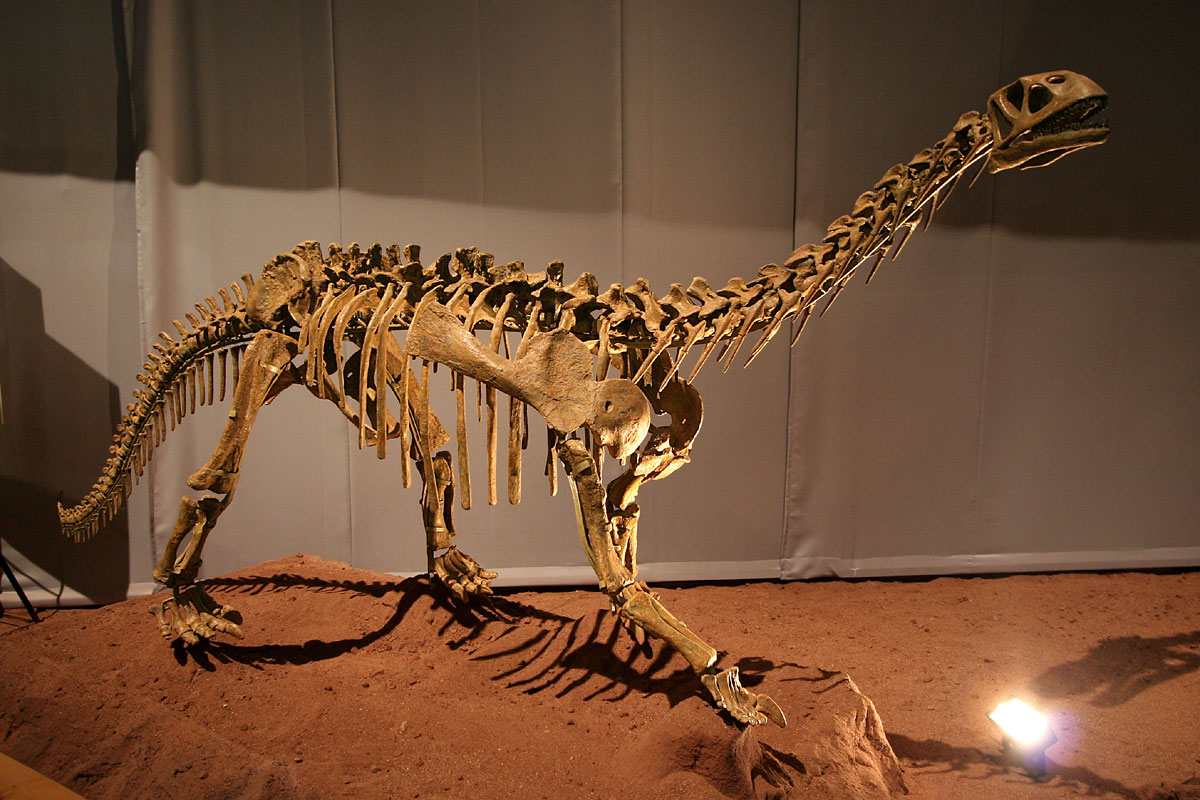
Bellusaurus has been suggested to represent a juvenile Klamelisaurus

In The Princeton Field Guide to Dinosaurs, a popular book with two editions published in 2010 and 2016, Paul has suggested that Klamelisaurus may have been be the adult form of Bellusaurus (known only from juvenile specimens). In 2018, Moore and colleagues redescribed Bellusaurus and provided several arguments to refute this notion. First, they noted that the two were not actually contemporaries; the holotype of Klamelisaurus originates from slightly older strata (rock layers). They also listed twenty-four characteristics in the vertebrae, coracoid, and humerus that differentiated the two genera. In their 2020 redescription of Klamelisaurus, they added four characteristics to this list, and also noted that Bellusaurus did not possess any of the unique features of Klamelisaurus.

Most of the characteristics on their list pertain to differences in pneumatic features in the vertebrae of Klamelisaurus and Bellusaurus that are not readily explainable by differences in age. In sauropods, vertebral air spaces typically become more extensive and invade more of the vertebrae with age. Bellusaurus possessed procamerate to weakly camerate air spaces (i.e., its air spaces were deep, leaving only a thin layer of bone at the midline, and were barely enclosed by bone) in its cervicals. Meanwhile, based on comparisons with its relatives, Moore and colleagues inferred that Klamelisaurus likely had camerate air spaces (i.e., enclosed by bone) in its cervicals. Based on the cervicals alone, they could not contradict the hypothesis that juvenile Bellusaurus could have grown into an adult with camellate air spaces in the cervicals, as is the case with Barosaurus. However, they noted that Bellusaurus possessed several pneumatic features in the dorsal neural spines and neural arches that Klamelisaurus lacked, which runs contrary to the expected pattern for euhelopodids and mamenchisaurids. Specifically, in the dorsals of Bellusaurus, the PCDLs (posterior centrodiapophyseal laminae) below the diapophyses bifurcated at the bottom; the CPOLs (centropostzygapophyseal laminae) at the rear of the centra had a sharp-edged branch situated in a relatively deep depression; and the diapophyses bore rimmed trough-like depressions.

Considering their temporal and anatomical differences, Moore and colleagues thus considered Klamelisaurus and Bellusaurus to be readily distinguishable. However, they also noted two characteristics on their list which may have varied with age: the bifurcated neural spines, and the presence of wing-shaped processes that projected further outwards than the postzygapophyses on the rear dorsals.

== Palaeoenvironment ==
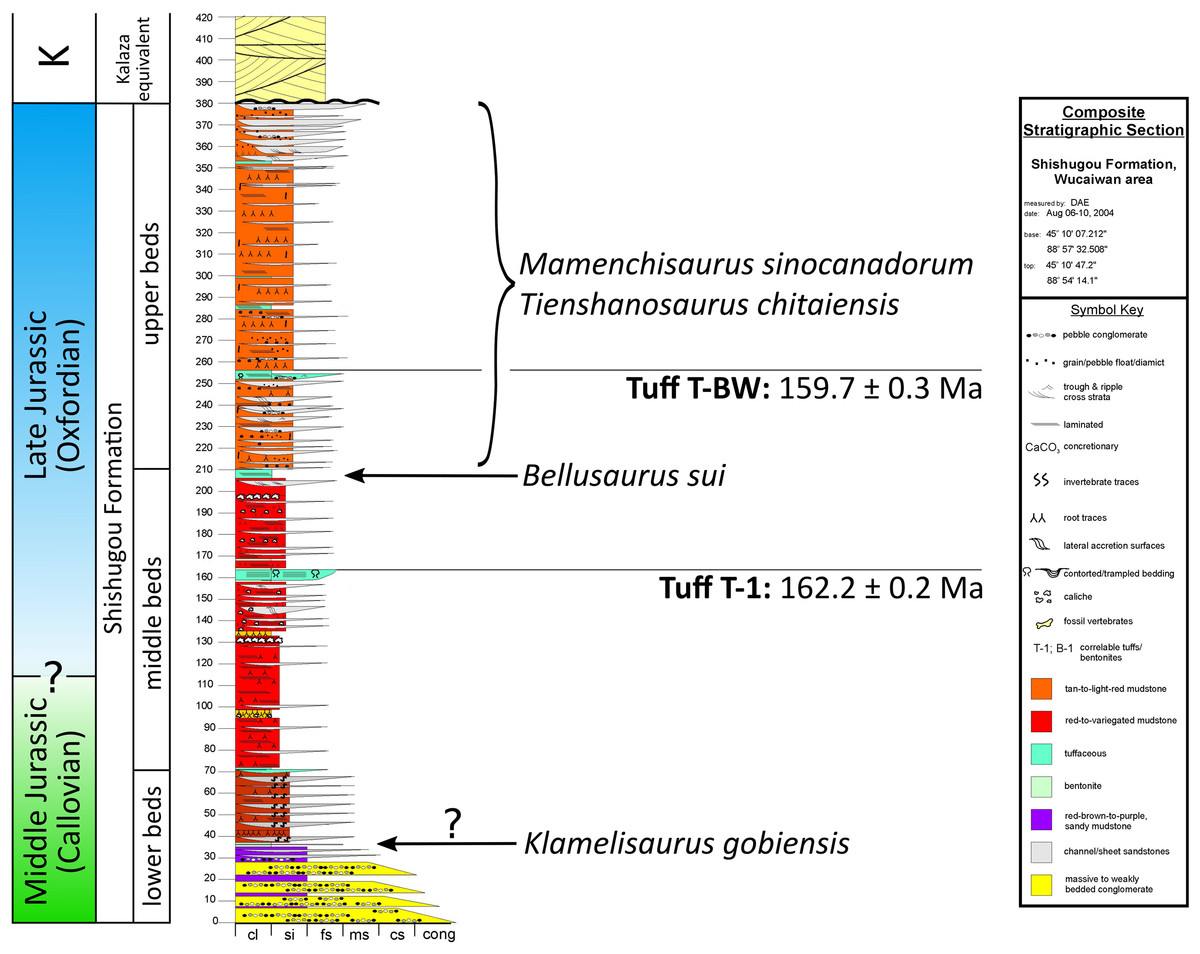
Stratigraphic position of sauropods in the Shishugou Formation

The holotype of Klamelisaurus originated from a rock layer that was described as being "gray-brown, purple-red sandy mudstone" by Zhao in 1993. This layer was situated at the top of what Zhao called the "Wucaiwan Formation", but a lack of differences in rock layers has led it to become subsumed into the Shishugou Formation as the "lower beds" or the Wucaiwan Member. Using stratigraphic correlation, this rock layer was found to lie below a tuff from the Shishugou Formation at the Wucaiwan locality, which has been dated radiometrically to 162.2 ± 0.2 Ma, or the Oxfordian age of the Jurassic period. Based on this, Moore and colleagues considered Klamelisaurus to have originated from the late Callovian age.

During the Callovian, the climate of the Shishugou Formation is considered to have been mesic (moderately and seasonally wet), with the environment at Wucaiwan having been an alluvial plain or marsh. Juliane Hinz and colleagues in 2010 reconstructed a petrified forest preserved in overlying Oxfordian rocks, located 17 km (11 mi) north of Jiangjunmiao. It would have consisted of Araucaria trees, with the undergrowth being occupied by Coniopteris tree ferns, Anglopteris and Osmunda ferns, Equisetites horsetails, and Elatocladus shrubs.

Three theropod dinosaurs have been discovered near Jiangjunmiao: Monolophosaurus, considered to have been no younger than the late Callovian and thus closest temporally to Klamelisaurus; Aorun, from layers in the "middle beds" that have been re-dated from the Callovian to the Oxfordian; and Sinraptor, from the Oxfordian "upper beds". The crocodylomorphs Sunosuchus and Junggarsuchus are known from other localities in the "lower beds". Meanwhile, the sauropods Bellusaurus, Mamenchisaurus sinocanadorum, and Tienshanosaurus are known from the "upper beds", above the level of the tuff at 162.2 Ma, and thus were not contemporaries of Klamelisaurus. Asides from these sauropods, Aorun, and Sinraptor, the Oxfordian portion of the Shishugou Formation preserves a diverse dinosaur fauna that also includes the theropods Haplocheirus, Shishugounykus, Zuolong, Guanlong, and Limusaurus; the ornithopod Gongbusaurus; the stegosaur Jiangjunosaurus; and the marginocephalians Yinlong and Hualianceratops.
