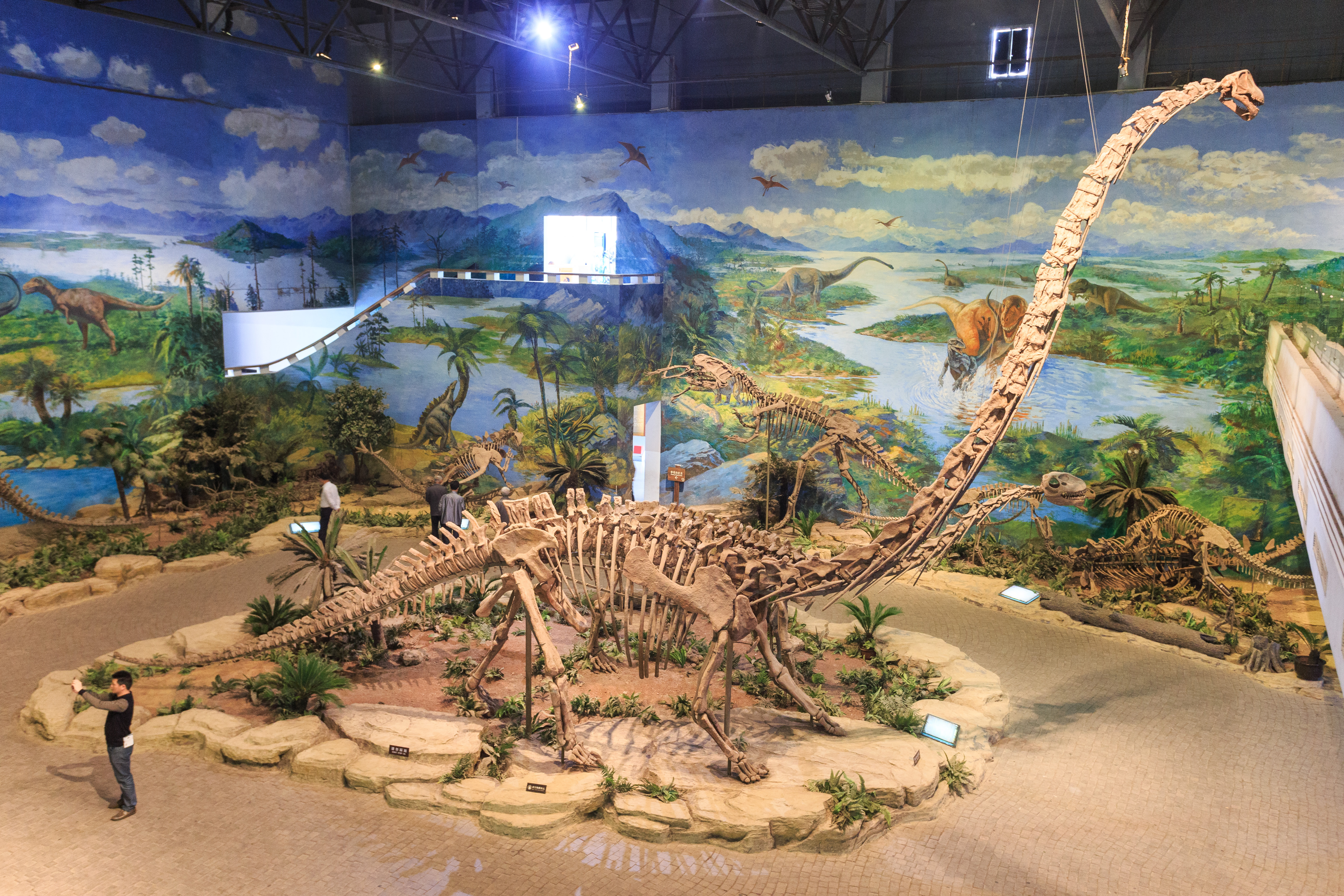
- Mounted skeleton of M. hochuanensis

Scientific classification
- Kingdom: Animalia
- Phylum: Chordata
- Class: Reptilia
- Clade: Dinosauria
- Clade: Saurischia
- Clade: †Sauropodomorpha
- Clade: †Sauropoda
- Clade: †Eusauropoda
- Family: †Mamenchisauridae
- Genus: †Mamenchisaurus; Young, 1954

Type species
- †Mamenchisaurus constructus Young, 1954

Other species
- †M. hochuanensis Young & Zhao, 1972; †M. sinocanadorum Russell & Zheng, 1993; †M. youngi Pi, Ouyang & Ye, 1996; †M. anyuensis He et al., 1996; †M. jingyanensis Zhang, Li & Zeng, 1998; †M. yunnanensis Fang et al., 2004; †M. sanjiangensis Dai et al., 2025

= Mamenchisaurus =

Mamenchisaurus Temporal range: Late Jurassic to Early Cretaceous (Oxfordian to Aptian), 161–114.4 Ma Possible record during the Albian

Sauropod dinosaur genus from Late Jurassic-Early Cretaceous Period

Mamenchisaurus (/məˌmʌntʃiˈsɔːrəs/ mə-MUN-chee-SOR-əs, or spelling pronunciation /məˌmɛntʃɪˈsɔːrəs/) is an extinct genus of sauropod dinosaurs known for their remarkably long necks, which made up nearly half the total body length. Numerous species have been assigned to the genus; however, the validity of these assignments has been questioned. Fossils have been found in the Sichuan Basin and Yunnan Province in China. Several species from the Upper Shaximiao Formation, whose geologic age is uncertain, have been described. However, evidence suggests this formation to be no earlier than the Oxfordian stage of the Late Jurassic. M. sinocanadorum dates to the Oxfordian stage (161.2 to 158.7 mya), and M. anyuensis to the Aptian stage of the Early Cretaceous (around 114.4 mya). Most species were medium-large to large sauropods, measuring roughly 15 to 26 meters (49 to 85 ft) in length—possibly up to 35 meters (115 ft), based on two undescribed vertebrae.

== History and species ==
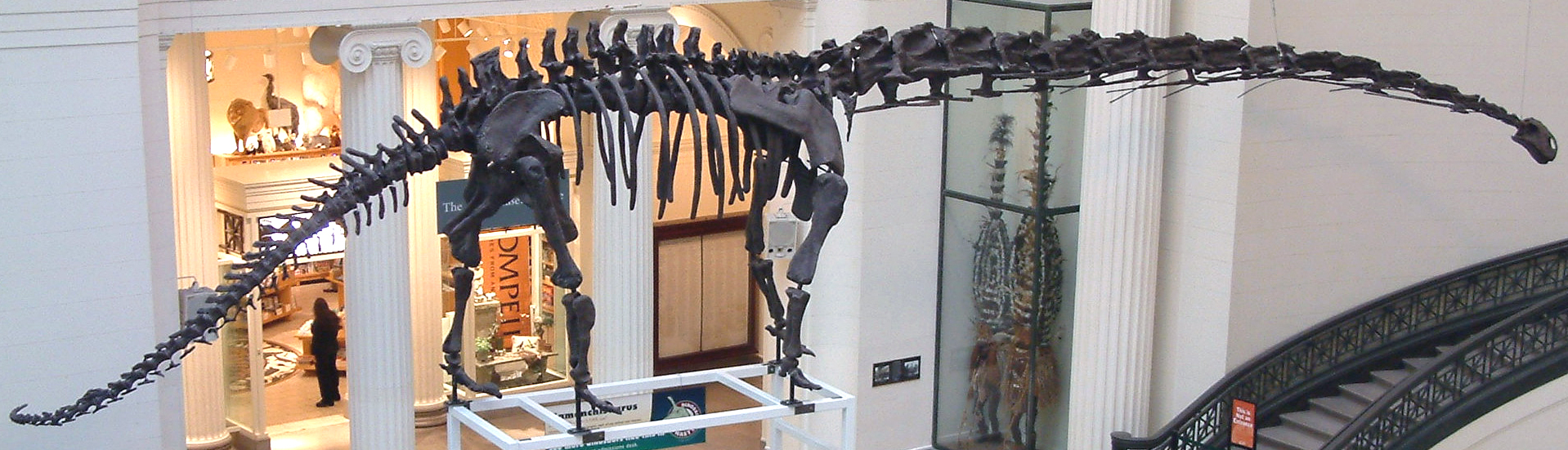
Mounted M. hochuanensis skeleton, Field Museum

Mamenchisaurus was first discovered in 1952 on the construction site of the Yitang Highway in Sichuan Province, China. The fossil site belonged to the Upper Shaximiao Formation, dating to at least the Late Jurassic. The partial skeleton fossil was later studied and named Mamenchisaurus constructus in 1954 by the renowned Chinese paleontologist Professor C. C. Young.

The type specimen (IVPP V. 790) was fragmentary, disordered, and not excavated in a technical way. Material included five dorsal vertebrae, 30 caudal vertebrae, rib fragments, dorsal neural spines, and chevrons. Fourteen neck vertebrae were preserved, but none were complete. Young noted that some neck vertebrae might have been missing. Limb material included two pieces of a femur, a complete tibia, fibula, astragalus, metatarsals, phalanges, and claws. The skull, forelimbs, and pelvic girdle were missing.

Mamenchisaurus means 'Mamenchi lizard', from the Chinese Pinyin mǎ (马 'horse') and mén (门 'gate'), while chi is an alternative transliteration of xī (溪 'stream' or 'brook'), combined with the suffix -saurus (from Greek sauros meaning 'lizard'). The intention was to name the genus after the place where its fossil was first found. However, due to an accentual mix-up by Young, the location name Mǎmíngxī (马鸣溪 'horse-neighing brook') was mistaken as Mǎménxī (马门溪 'horse-gate brook'). The fact that the first Mamenchisaurus fossil was found during construction work led Young to name the type species as Mamenchisaurus constructus.

In 1958, Young described additional sauropod remains collected from Gansu Province. The remains consisted of various partial specimens (IVPP V. 945, V. 946, V. 947, V. 948), most of which were assigned to M. constructus. In 1972, one of these specimens was reassigned to M. hochuanensis.

=== Mamenchisaurus hochuanensis ===
The holotype skulls of M. youngi, M. jingyanensis, M. sinocanadorum, and a skull referred to M. hochuanensis

In 1972, Young and Xijin Zhao described a second species, Mamenchisaurus hochuanensis. The fossils were found near a village in Hechuan, north of Chongqing (originally part of the Sichuan Province), China, 200 meters (660 ft) above the Fu River on the slope of a mountain. The M. hochuanensis fossil site also belonged to the Upper Shaximiao Formation, very close to the location of the M. constructus type specimen, dating to at least the Late Jurassic. Locals first discovered the remains sometime before the Chinese Communist Revolution. However, the remains were ultimately abandoned and left to weather in situ. Excavation of the specimen did not begin until 1957, when a team from the Sichuan Provincial Museum was dispatched to the site. Preparation, reconstruction, mounting, and description of the skeleton were completed in 1965.

The holotype specimen (CCG V 20401) consisted of an almost complete and articulated vertebral column, including 19 elongated cervical vertebrae, which were almost entirely preserved, 12 dorsal vertebrae, four sacral vertebrae, and 35 caudal vertebrae, with only the last several missing. Also missing from the skeleton were most of the forelimbs and the skull. When M. hochuanensis was first described, it was the largest sauropod known from China.

In 1958, Young described a mamenchisaur specimen (IVPP V. 946) from the Haishiwan region of Yongdeng, Gansu Province. This specimen was initially assigned to M. constructus. However, in 1972 it was reassigned to M. hochuanensis as a paratype. This specimen was slightly smaller than the holotype and consisted of less material overall. However, it contained some anatomical details missing in the type specimen.

In 2001, another specimen (ZDM0126) was described and referred to M. hochuanensis. It was found in 1995 at a construction site in Huidong New District, Zigong City, Sichuan Province. This specimen was nearly complete and mostly articulated, preserving features missing from the holotype, such as the skull, pectoral girdle, and forelimb material. However, a 2020 phylogenetic analysis by Moore and colleagues cast doubt on the referral of this specimen to M. hochuanensis.

=== Mamenchisaurus sinocanadorum ===
Location of the Junggar Basin in Xinjiang, China, where M. sinocanadorum is found.

In August 1987, Z.-M. Dong observed a cervical rib projecting out of a cliff during an expedition by the China-Canada Dinosaur Project. The fossil site was located in the Junggar Basin, Xinjiang, from the upper part of the Shishugou Formation, making it one of the few mamenchisaurs known from outside the Sichuan basin. The locality is thought to date to around 162.2 million years ago. The location of the quarry where the specimen was found was originally reported as being 22 kilometres (14 miles) north of an abandoned town, Jiangjunmiao. However, the original authors reported incorrect coordinates for the quarry that were later corrected by a subsequent study. The coarse and weak sandstone in which the specimen was preserved in, alongside the large and fragile nature of the bones, impeded excavation, leading to only the most anterior vertebrae being recovered despite more neck material being present. The specimen was named as a new species of Mamenchisaurus, coined M. sinocanadorum, in 1993 by Dale Russell and Zhong Zheng. The specific name refers to the China-Canada Dinosaur Project.

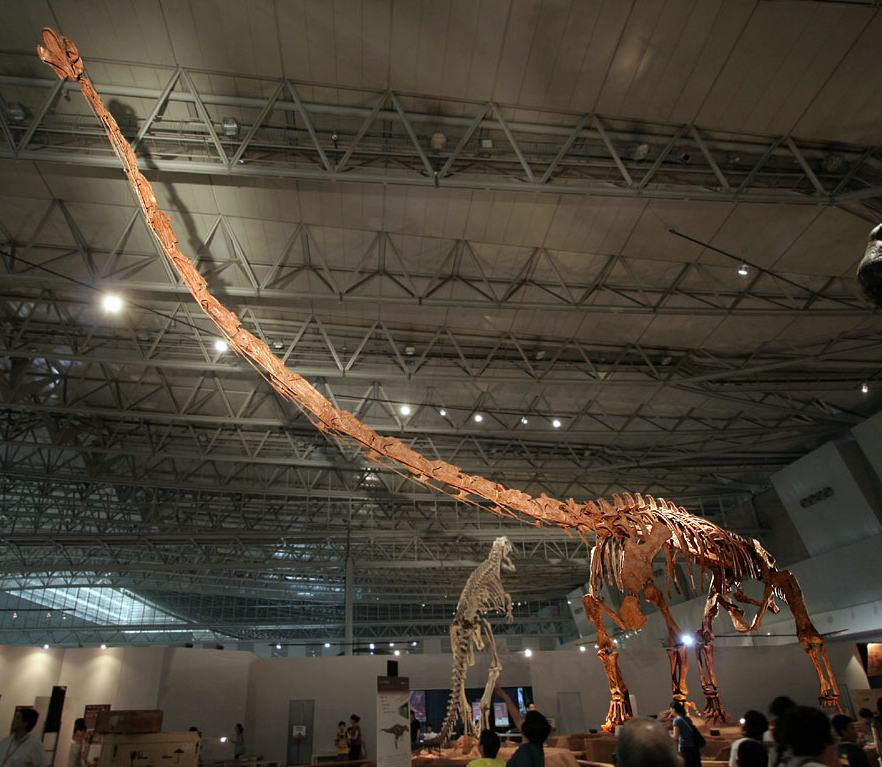
Mounted reconstruction of M. sinocanadorum in Makuhari Messe convention center in Chiba City, Japan as part of the "Dinosaur Expo 2009 - the Miracle of Deserts" Exhibition

Overall, the specimen, IVPP V10603, consists of a complete left mandible, a right dentary, a vomer, a right pterygoid, a possible ectopterygoid, a right quadrate, portions of the second through fourth cervical vertebrae, and an intact left cervical rib. The neural arches of the vertebrae were well fused to the centra, suggesting that the animal was mature. The authors noted that the teeth are fully erupted but unworn, possibly suggesting the animal starved. Due to the limited amount of bone at the cliff base, the authors proposed that the cervical vertebrae broke away before full decomposition. The head and part of the neck then drifted downstream until they came to rest in shallow water on a point bar, where they were eventually buried. In 2023, M. sinocanadorum was redescribed by Andrew Moore and colleagues. The authors could not locate the vomer, right pterygoid, the possible ectopterygoid, the right quadrate, and the right dentary for restudy. A phylogenetic analysis performed by the authors found it to be outside the clade of other Mamenchisaurus species, closely allied to Xinjiangtitan, but refrained from taxonomic action until the type species M. constructus received re-evaluation.

Two large cervical vertebrae, found from the same formation as M. sinocanadorum, were informally referred to the species by Gregory S. Paul in 2019 based on their large size and origin. However, these vertebrae have not yet been formally described. Paul has suggested these may represent one of the largest dinosaurs known. Moore and colleagues could not support the referral of these vertebrae to M. sinocanadorum in their redescription of the species because the vertebrae lack anatomical overlap with the known material of the type specimen, and cannot therefore be compared for diagnostic purposes. They also noted an undescribed specimen on display at the China University of the Geosciences in Beijing, labelled as belonging to the species, which has not been evaluated firsthand or mentioned in the scientific literature. Accordingly, they consider the referral to the species premature.

=== Mamenchisaurus anyuensis ===
M. anyuensis was described in 1996 by Xinlu He and colleagues. The remains were discovered in 1987 from two locations near the town of Longchiaoxiang in the Sichuan Basin. At one quarry, at least five to six individuals were found. At a second quarry, four individuals were found. One of these became the holotype, AL001, representing two-thirds of an articulated skeleton. Other specimens were also reported, AL002, AL003, and AL101-106, which provide more skeletal information. The species name references Anyue County, where it was discovered. M. anyuensis is known from both the top of the Suining Formation and the bottom of the Penglaizhen Formation. Uranium–lead dating places M. anyuensis in the Suining Formation at 114.4 Ma in age; as this would make it roughly 30 million years younger than the other Mamenchisaurus species, it is unlikely that M. anyuensis is actually a member of the genus.

The holotype specimen preserved eight posterior cervical vertebrae, twelve dorsal vertebrae, five sacral vertebrae, several caudal vertebrae, and a complete pelvis. Another specimen (AL102) preserved five articulated cervical vertebrae from the middle of the neck. Except for the digit bones, the forelimb is completely known and represented by multiple individuals.

=== Mamenchisaurus youngi ===
Also described in 1996 was Mamenchisaurus youngi from the Upper Shaximiao Formation. A local resident quarrying stone near a village in Zigong, Sichuan Province, found the remains in December 1988. In January the following year, a team from the Zigong Dinosaur Museum was organised to collect the specimen. The species was named in honour of C. C. Young.

The holotype specimen (ZDM 0083) was very complete, with the vertebral column entirely articulated from the first cervical down to the 8th tail vertebra. Also preserved were the pectoral girdle, pelvic girdle, and material from all four limbs, also nearly in articulation. This specimen also preserved a nearly complete skull.

=== Mamenchisaurus jingyanensis ===
M. jingyanensis skeleton, National Natural History Museum of China

M. jingyanensis was described in 1998 by Yihong Zhang, Kui Li, and Qinghua Zeng. The type specimen (CV00734) was located 200 meters (660 ft) away from the administrative headquarters of the town of Meiwang, Jingyan County. Another specimen (JV002) was found in the village of Sanjiang, approximately 10 kilometers (6 mi) from Meiwang, and was assigned the paratype. A third specimen (CV00219) was found near the village of Dujia, about 10 kilometers from Sanjiang. The fossils were located in the Sichuan basin, from the Upper Shaximiao Formation. The species name refers to Jingyan County, from which the majority of specimens were excavated. M. jingyanensis has a femur length of 2 metres (6.6 ft).

The type specimen includes a partial scapula and complete coracoid, forelimb material, a complete ischium, a relatively complete skull, and a hyoid bone. The paratype specimen included three anterior cervical vertebrae, several weathered dorsal vertebrae, a column of nearly articulated caudal vertebrae, relatively complete hind and forelimbs, and isolated teeth. The third specimen preserved a column of cervical vertebrae with articulated ribs, four fused sacral vertebrae, several caudal vertebrae, a complete scapulocoracoid, various limb bones, and isolated teeth.

=== Mamenchisaurus sanjiangensis ===
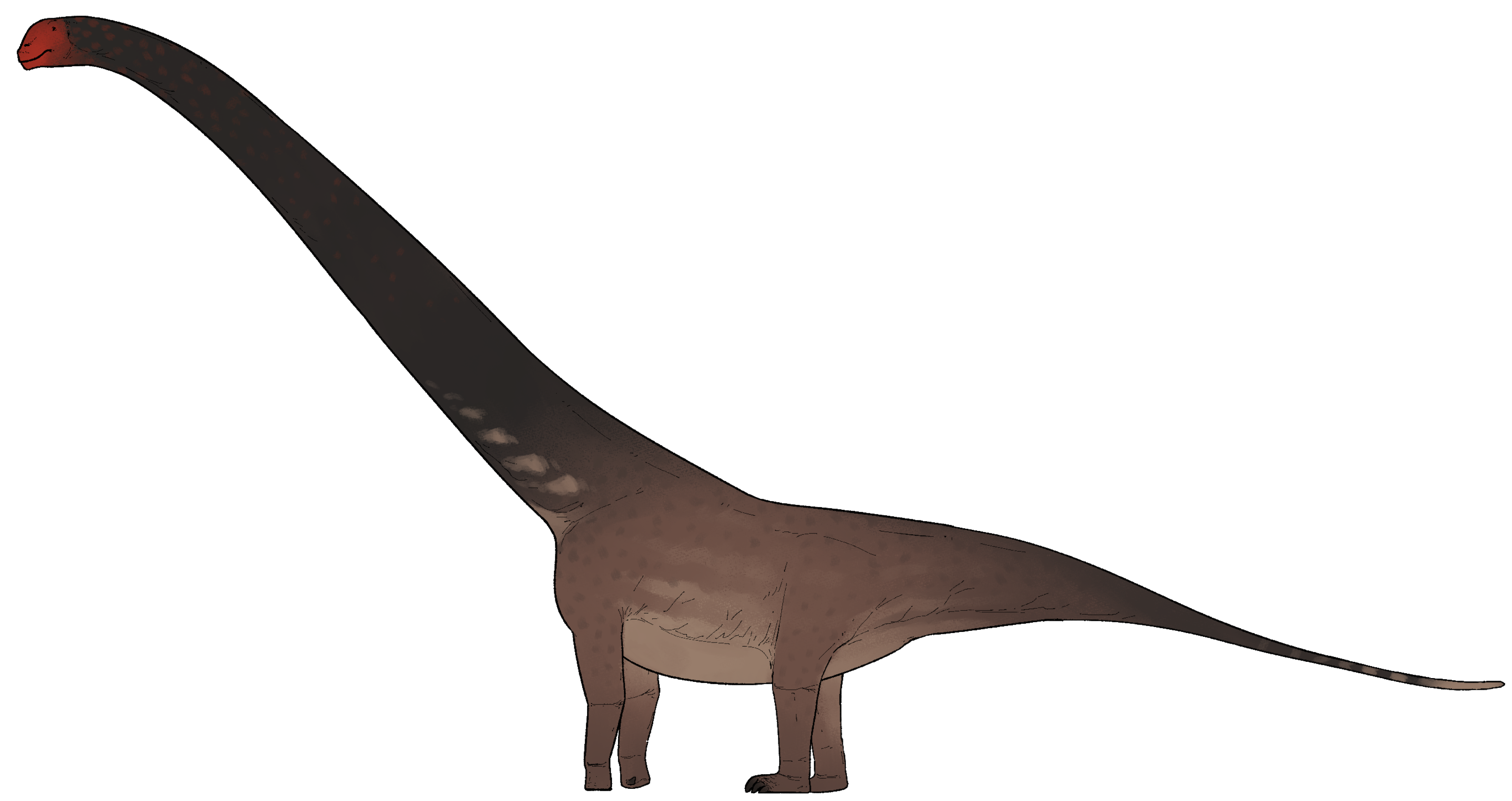
Restoration of M. sanjiangensis

M. sanjiangensis was described in 2025 by Hui Dai and colleagues based on a partial skeleton from the upper Shaximiao Formation (possibly early Oxfordian in age) in Hechuan district, Chongqing. The holotype specimen, CIP V0001, comprises a partial articulated skeleton, including the last two cervical vertebrae, a complete series of 12 dorsal vertebrae, five sacral vertebrae, and the first four caudal vertebrae, in addition to the pelvic girdle and a nearly complete left hindlimb (femur, tibia, and fibula). It can be distinguished from other Mamenchisaurus species based on the presence of an additional fossa (depression) on the posterior cervical and anterior dorsal vertebrae, as well as by the distinct arrangement of the spinodiapophyseal lamina (a ridge separating the vertebra's pneumatic chambers) on the third–seventh dorsal vertebrae. The researchers placed M. sanjiangensis based on the presence of procoelous anterior caudal vertebrae and camellate internal structure of the cervical and dorsal vertebrae. Additionally, although the authors acknowledged that the composition and validity of Mamenchisauridae and Mamenchisaurus remain controversial and in need of revision, they chose to use Mamenchisaurus as the generic name for this specimen "to avoid further nomenclatural confusion".

=== Other referred species and material ===
Other species of Mamenchisaurus have been named over the years. In some cases, species from other genera have been transferred to Mamenchisaurus, but the validity of the referrals is disputed by other researchers. Some of these species are based on fragmentary remains and have been considered undiagnostic. Others are considered invalid or as nomina nuda.

In 1976, Hou, Chao, and Chu named a new genus, Zigongosaurus fuxiensis. Known from at least four specimens from the Upper Shaximiao Formation. The type specimen (CV 02501) included skull material: maxilla, dentary, and basioccipital. Additional postcranial material includes dorsal vertebrae, pubis, and ischium. Since the description of Zigongosaurus, other researchers have disagreed over whether the genus is valid. In 1983, Dong, Zhou, and Zhang assigned some of the remains to the similarly named Omeisaurus fuxiensis, and the rest to Omeisaurus junghsiensis. Zhang and Chen assigned the remains to Mamenchisaurus as M. fuxiensis in 1996. Li and Cai considered it a nomen nudum in 1997. In 1999, Valérie Martin-Rolland considered Zigongosaurus a valid genus. Wang and colleagues considered it undiagnostic in 2019.

Another species, "Mamenchisaurus guangyuanensis", has not been formally described and is therefore a nomen nudum. It is known from the remains of several individuals, ranging from juvenile to adult, from the Upper Shaximiao Formation. The largest individuals were estimated to be 16 meters (52 ft) long. It was originally described by Zhang Suping in her 1981 thesis as "Omeisaurus guangyuanensis", but in 1997, Li and Cai listed it as a species of Mamenchisaurus. Like Mamenchisaurus, but unlike Omeisaurus, it shows bifurcated neural spines and procoelous caudal vertebrae. It was considered non-diagnostic by Wang and colleagues in 2019.

M. yunnanensis was described in 2004 by Fang and colleagues based on a specimen from the Anning Formation in the Sichuan Basin, Yunnan. The type specimen consisted of disarticulated forelimb, hindlimb, and pelvic material. Wang and colleagues questioned the assignment to Mamenchisaurus in 2019. In 2025, Dai and colleagues argued that, because the species lacks a detailed description and it has not been included in a phylogenetic analysis, its position within Mamenchisauridae, or even its validity, should be treated with caution.

In 1988, He and colleagues considered Omeisaurus changshouensis to be more closely related to Mamenchisaurus based on features of the caudal vertebrae. In 2019, Tan and colleagues agreed with this assessment. In 1996, Zhang and Chen considered Omeisaurus changshouensis and Omeisaurus gongjianensis as referable to Mamenchisaurus. However, in 2004, Upchurch considered O. changshouensis undiagnosable.

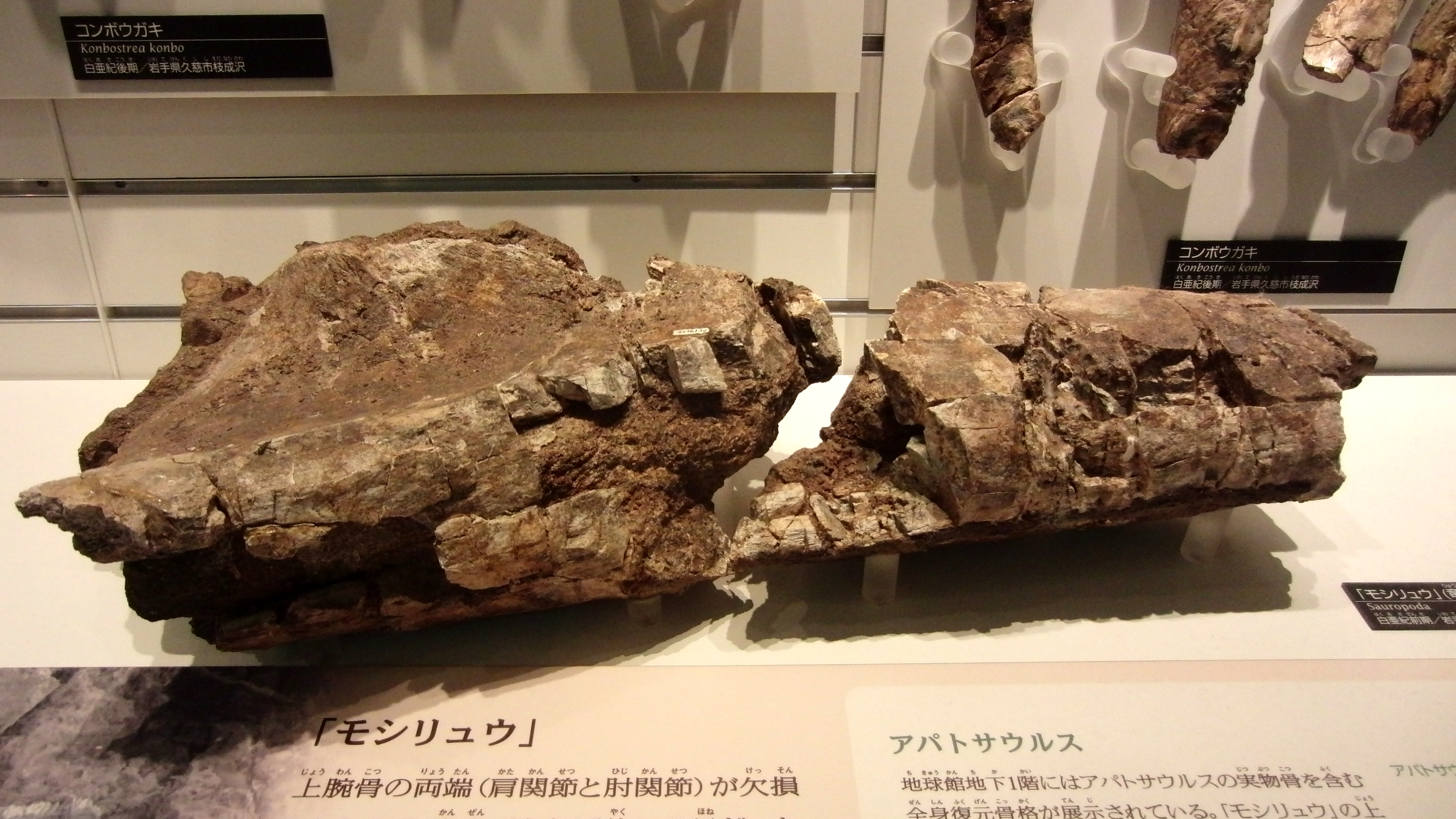
NSM PV17656

In 1978, an incomplete sauropod humerus (NSM PV17656) found in a layer of the Early Cretaceous-aged Miyako Group of Japan was considered to probably belong to Mamenchisaurus. In 1991, it was referred to ?Mamenchisaurus sp. by Hasegawa and colleagues. However, the humerus was reassessed by Azuma & Tomida in 1998, and Barrett and colleagues in 2002. These authors found no distinguishing features that could place the humerus into a specific sauropod group. They regarded it as an indeterminate sauropod. The remains were given an informal name "Moshi-ryu"; "Moshi" being the local name for the location it was discovered, and "ryu" being Japanese for dragon—also referred to as "Moshisaurus".

== Description ==
Size comparison of M. constructus, M. youngi, M. hochuanensis and M. sinocanadorum

The genus Mamenchisaurus contains several named species, but there is disagreement about whether all species assigned to it should be included. Some Mamenchisaurus species are almost completely known, and others are fragmentary. The various species differ in overall size and specific features of the skull and skeleton but share typical sauropod traits, such as quadrupedalism, large bodies, small heads, and long tails. The most distinctive feature of mamenchisaurids is their exceptionally long necks, which approach half their total length. The type specimens of M. youngi and M. hochuanensis preserve complete necks, which consist of 18 and 19 vertebrae, respectively. Mamenchisaurus cervical vertebrae are elongated, lightly constructed, and highly pneumatic. The neural spines on their posterior cervical and anterior dorsal vertebrae are bifurcated. Their shoulders were somewhat higher than their hips.

The type species, M. constructus, is not particularly well preserved but has been estimated to be around 13 to 15 meters (43 to 49 ft) in length, with a mass of around 5 tonnes (5.5 short tons). The neck of the type specimen was not completely preserved, but Young estimated the whole neck at 4.67 meters (15.3 ft).

The overall length of the M. hochuanensis type specimen is around 21 to 22 meters (69 to 72 ft) with a neck 9.3 meters (31 ft) long. Young and Zhao estimated the mass of M. hochuanensis at 45 tonnes (50 short tons). However, later volumetric mass estimates are lower at 14 to 18.2 tonnes (15.4 to 20.1 short tons). In 1972, Young and Chao described M. hochuanensis as having 19 cervical and 12 dorsal vertebrae. Paul Upchurch and colleagues suggested this vertebral count may be incorrect. The authors noted that the vertebra usually referred to as the second dorsal possessed a hyposphene, a feature not typically seen until the third or fourth dorsal in sauropods. They provisionally proposed that the actual vertebral count might be 18 cervicals and 13 dorsals in M. hochuanensis.

M. sinocanadorum is known from fragmentary remains, but these suggest that it was a large species. The cervical vertebrae are on average 1.19 times longer than those of M. hochuanensis; based on this, Russel and Zheng estimated the type specimen at 26 meters (85 ft) in length. Taylor and Wedel estimated the neck to be around 12 meters (39 ft) in length based on comparisons with M. hochuanensis. However, the 2023 redescription gave a longer estimate of between 14.4 meters (47 ft) and 15.1 meters (50 ft) based on comparison to Xinjiangtitan, though the authors stressed the level of uncertainty. The type specimen possessed the longest cervical rib of any described sauropod dinosaur, measuring 4.2 meters (14 ft). For comparison, a Sauroposeidon cervical rib measures 3.42 meters (11.2 ft). Based on CT imaging, Moore and colleagues estimated the cervical vertebrae of M. sinocandorum to be 69–77% air by volume, assuming complete removal of bone marrow. The mandible was 60.3 centimeters (23.7 in) in length and had 19 teeth. In contrast to the more squared-off jaws of diplodocids, the front of the mandibles met at an oblique angle. Two as-yet-undescribed cervical vertebrae may belong to one of the largest dinosaurs known. Gregory S. Paul suggested that these might belong to M. sinocanadorum and estimated a length of 35 meters (115 ft) and weighing 60 to 80 tonnes (66 to 88 short tons). However, the referral of these vertebrae to M. sinocanadorum has been questioned.

M. anyuensis shares morphological similarities with M. hochuanensis. He and colleagues estimated the length of this species at 21 meters (69 ft). Paul estimated it at 25 meters (82 ft) in length with a mass of 25 tonnes (28 short tons).

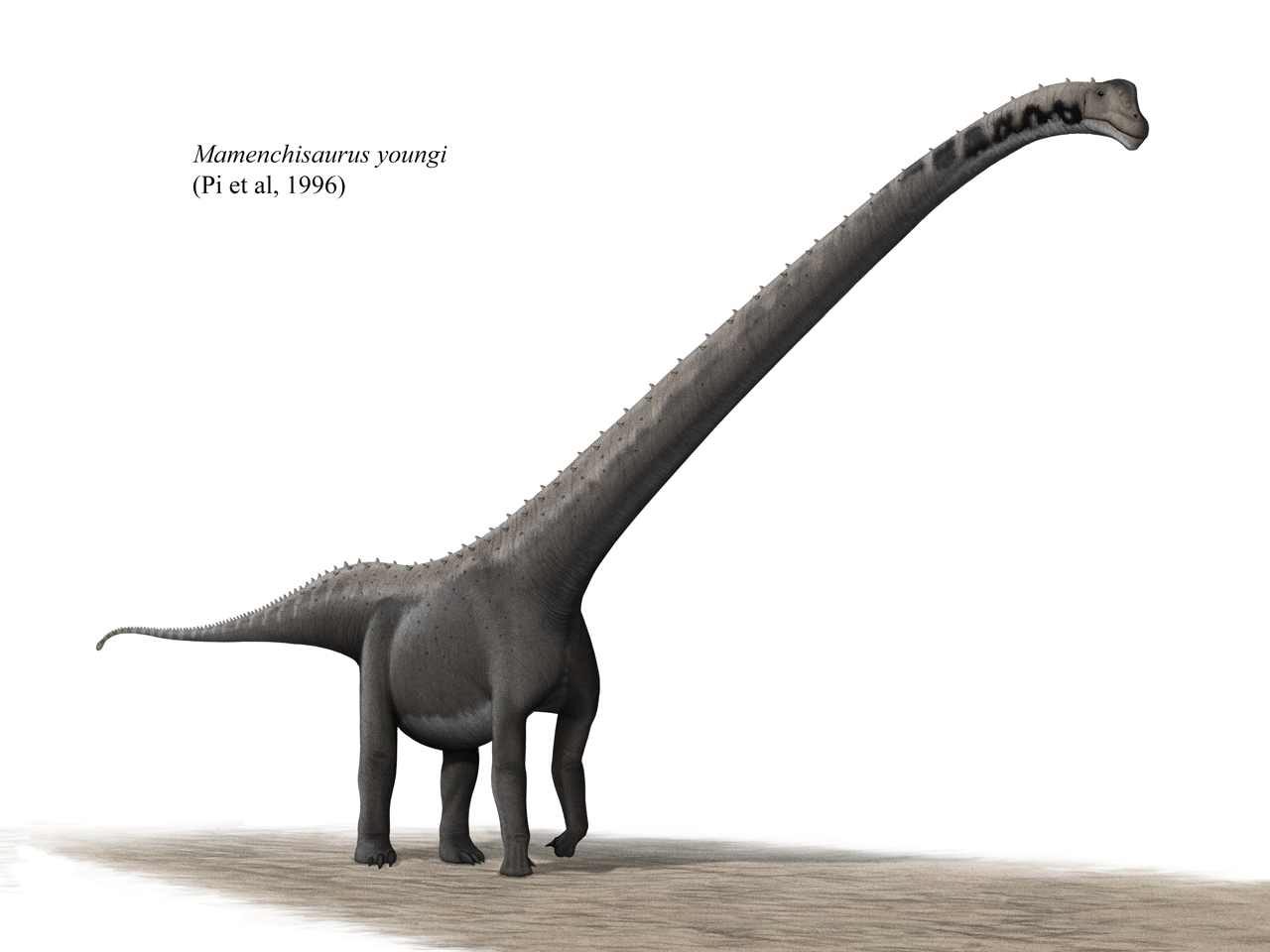
Artist's impression of M. youngi

M. youngi is one of the smaller species of Mamenchisaurus and is known from relatively complete remains. The type specimen was around 16 meters (52 ft) long with a 6.5-meter (21 ft) neck. The mass of M. youngi was estimated at 7.87 tonnes (8.68 short tons) using volumetric techniques. The holotype specimen preserves a nearly complete skull. There were four teeth in the premaxilla, 18 in the maxilla, and 22 to 24 in the dentary. An unusual part of the skeleton is the wedge-shaped sacrum; this causes the sacrum and the base of the tail to pitch up relative to the rest of the vertebral column.

M. jingyanensis was estimated by Zhang and colleagues to be between 20 and 26 meters (66 and 85 ft) in length. Paul estimated it at 20 meters (66 ft) with a mass of 12 tonnes (13 short tons). The skull was restored at 55 centimeters (22 in) in length. There were four teeth in the premaxilla, 14–16 in the maxilla, and 17–19 in the dentary.

Mamenchisaurus has forked chevrons (or sled chevrons) starting around the middle of the tail, similar to those seen in diplodocids; these chevrons curve strongly backwards and add a forward projection. Paul has argued that these types of chevrons are adaptations linked to rearing behaviour. In a tripodal stance, the tail acts as a prop, and the forked chevrons would help distribute the weight evenly. Paul also notes that the pelvises of mamenchisaurs are retroverted (tilted), which may have allowed slow bipedal walking.

ZDM0126, a specimen possibly referable to M. hochuanensis, possessed four fused caudal vertebrae near the tip of the tail. These vertebrae have expanded neural arches and taller neural spines, possibly representing a tail club. A study by Lida Xing and colleagues performed a finite element analysis on the club. The authors concluded that the club would have had limited ability to serve as a defensive weapon but might also have functioned as a sensory organ. Other Chinese sauropods, Shunosaurus and Omeisaurus, are also known to have had tail clubs, but they differ in shape from that of ZDM0126.

The neck posture and feeding strategies of sauropod dinosaurs are controversial. Andreas Christian and colleagues analysed the neck of M. youngi and found that when articulated in a neutral posture, the neck was almost straight, with a slight upward bend at the base and a slight downward bend towards the head. The base of the neck has comparatively high upward flexibility but limited downward flexibility. The region near the head had better downward flexibility and low upward flexibility. In the mid-region, downward flexibility was high, which led the authors to conclude that M. youngi frequently fed at low levels. Long overlapping cervical ribs may have limited flexibility. The authors also estimated the stress on the intervertebral joint cartilage. Their results suggest the neck was kept mostly straight, with the possible exception of the neck base and near the head.

A large ulna (GPIT SGP 2006/10) measuring less than 96 centimeters (38 in) in length, referred to Mamenchisaurus sp. from the Shishugou Formation, was used in a bone histology analysis. By sectioning the bone and counting the growth rings, the age at death was estimated at 43 years.

== Classification ==
Mamenchisaurus is sometimes referred to as a 'wastebasket taxon', with researchers questioning both the number of referred species and the number of fragmentary specimens assigned to the genus. The genus is poorly defined, and its taxonomy is increasingly confused, making it challenging to understand the phylogenetic relationships. Several analyses have failed to show Mamenchisaurus as monophyletic, suggesting the need to revise the genus. Additional research on the type species, M. constructus, is required to better understand the genus.

When M. constructus was first described, Young noted that the chevron bones indicated an affinity with Diplodocidae but was uncertain about its exact position. In 1958, Young assigned Mamenchisaurus to the Titanosauridae. With the description of M. hochuanensis in 1972, Young and Zhao created the family Mamenchisauridae. In 1978, when no Mamenchisaurus skulls were known, Berman and McIntosh assigned the genus to Diplodocidae based on diplodocid-like vertebral features such as the forked chevrons. In 1990, McIntosh assigned Mamenchisaurus to the subfamily Mamenchisaurinae, which was placed inside Diplodocidae.

An analysis by Upchurch in 1995 found that Mamenchisaurus belonged to the family Euhelopodidae, which, having been named first, would take priority over Mamenchisauridae. Several later analyses found Euhelopus to be a more distantly related macronarian, with Mamenchisaurus in Mamenchisauridae just outside of Neosauropoda.

Analyses by Sekiya in 2011 and Moore and colleagues in 2020 treated M. constructus, M. hochuanensis, ZDM 0126 (M. hochuanensis referred), M. sinocandadorum, and M. youngi separately. Moore and colleagues found the position of M. constructus to be unstable, probably due to the limited character information in its description. Depending on the dataset used, Euhelopus would either be within Macronaria, as other studies have found, or outside Neosauropoda in a more traditional position, grouped with other Mamenchisaurus-like taxa. The latter scenario would make mamenchisaurids members of Euhelopodidae. The analyses of Sekiya (2011) and Moore and colleagues (2020) did not recover ZDM 0126 as a sister taxon to the holotype of M. hochuanensis, casting doubt on its referral to the species.

The cladogram below shows a possible phylogenetic position of the genus within Sauropoda, from Allain and Aquesbi, 2008:

- Sauropoda
  - Antetonitrus
  - - Gongxianosaurus
    - - Isanosaurus
      - Gravisauria
        - Vulcanodontidae
          - Vulcanodon
          - Tazoudasaurus
        - Eusauropoda
          - Barapasaurus
          - Patagosaurus
          - - Omeisauridae
              - Omeisaurus
              - Mamenchisaurus
            - Neosauropoda

Below, two phylogenetic trees show the internal relationships of Euhelopodidae/Mamenchisauridae in the two analyses Moore and colleagues deemed most favourable, the implied-weights and Bayesian analyses of the Gonzàlez Riga dataset.

Topology A: Implied-weights analysis, Gonzàlez Riga dataset

- Mamenchisauridae
  - Tienshanosaurus chitaiensis
  - - Omeisaurus junghsiensis
    - Core Mamenchisaurus‑like taxa
      - Wamweracaudia keranjei
      - - - Qijianglong guokr
          - Mamenchisaurus sinocanadorum
        - - - Chuanjiesaurus anaensis
            - Analong chuanjieensis
          - - Mamenchisaurus hochuanensis (holotype)
            - Mamenchisaurus hochuanensis (referred)
            - - Mamenchisaurus youngi
              - - Shishugou cervicodorsals
                - - Phu Kradung taxon
                  - Klamelisaurus gobiensis

Topology B: Time-calibrated Bayesian analysis, Gonzàlez Riga dataset

- Euhelopodidae
  - - Omeisaurus junghsiensis
    - - Cetiosauriscus stewarti
      - - Omeisaurus maoianus
        - Omeisaurus tianfuensis
  - - Tienshanosaurus chitaiensis
    - Core Mamenchisaurus‑like taxa
      - - Chuanjiesaurus anaensis
        - - Analong chuanjieensis
          - - Qijianglong guokr
            - - Shishugou cervicodorsals
              - Mamenchisaurus sinocanadorum
      - - - - Mamenchisaurus hochuanensis (holotype)
            - Mamenchisaurus constructus
          - - Phu Kradung taxon
            - Klamelisaurus gobiensis
        - - Mamenchisaurus hochuanensis (referred)
          - Mamenchisaurus youngi
          - - Wamweracaudia keranjei
            - - - Xianshanosaurus shijiagouensis
                - Daxiatitan binglingi
              - - Euhelopus zdanskyi
                - Dongbeititan dongi

The 2023 redescription of M. sinocanadorum found a consistent sister taxon relationship with Xinjiangtitan, with Hudiesaurus and ZDM 0126 (previously referred to M. hochuanensis) also found to be consistent relatives.

- Mamenchisauridae
  - Tienshanosaurus
  - - Omeisaurus junghsiensis
    - - Wamweracaudia
      - - Qijianglong
        - - Mamenchisaurus constructus
          - Bellusaurus
          - - - Rhomaleopakhus
              - - Chuanjiesaurus
                - Analong
            - - Mamenchisaurus youngi
              - - - Mamenchisaurus hochuanensis (holotype)
                  - - Shishugou cervicodorsals
                    - - Phu Krandung taxon
                      - Klamelisaurus
                - - - Mamenchisaurus sinocanadorum
                    - Xinjiangtitan
                  - - Hudiesaurus
                    - - Daanosaurus
                      - Mamenchisaurus hochuanensis (referred)

Below is a cladogram from the description of Mamenchisaurus sanjiangensis.

- Mamenchisauridae
  - - Spinophorosaurus nigerensis
    - Nebulasaurus taito
  - - - Omeisaurus junghsiensis
      - Omeisaurus maoianus
    - - - Analong chuanjieensis
        - - Rhoetosaururs brownei
          - Yuanmousaurus jiangyiensis
      - - - Omeisaurus tianfuensis
          - Omeisaurus puxiani
        - - Jingiella dongxingensis
          - - Tienshanosaurus chitaiensis
            - - Wamweracaudia keranjei
              - Huangshanlong anhuiensis
              - Rhomaleopakhus turpanensis
              - Klamelisaurus gobiensis
              - Mamenchisaurus sanjiangensis
              - Mamenchisaurus hochuanensis
              - Mamenchisaurus youngi
              - Mamenchisaurus constructus
              - Mamenchisaurus sinocanadorum
              - - Anhuilong diboensis
                - Chuanjiesaurus anaensis
              - - Xinjiangtitan shanshanensis
                - Qijianglong guokr

== Paleochronology ==
Mamenchisaurus was originally thought to have ranged from the Middle to Late Jurassic. However, there is no reliable dating for the Upper Shaximiao Formation, where many of the Mamenchisaurus species are found.

A study published in 2018 used uranium–lead dating on the underlying Omeisaurus-bearing beds of the Lower Shaximiao Formation, previously thought to belong to the Middle Jurassic. However, the radiometric dating found the Lower Shaximiao Formation dated to the Late Jurassic, Oxfordian Stage, around 159 million years ago (mya). This finding suggests a younger age for the overlying Mamenchisaurus-bearing rocks of the Upper Shaximiao, implying them to be no older than the Oxfordian.

M. sinocanadorum was found from the Middle to Upper Shishugou Formation. Radiometric dating suggests this formation dates to the Oxfordian, ranging from 158.7 to 161.2 mya. M. anyuensis, was found in the Suining Formation, thought initially to be Middle to Late Jurassic. A 2019 study found these rocks belonged to the Early Cretaceous, Aptian Stage, with an average age of around 114.4 mya. This indicates that mamenchisaurids might have existed around 30 million years longer than previously thought.
