= Jingiella =

Jingiella Temporal range: Late Jurassic, Kimmeridgian?
- Skeletal diagram of the holotype

Scientific classification
- Kingdom: Animalia
- Phylum: Chordata
- Class: Reptilia
- Clade: Dinosauria
- Clade: Saurischia
- Clade: †Sauropodomorpha
- Clade: †Sauropoda
- Family: †Mamenchisauridae
- Genus: †Jingiella; Ren et al., 2024
- Species: †J. dongxingensis

Binomial name
- †Jingiella dongxingensis (Ren et al., 2024)

Synonyms
- "Jingia" Ren et al., 2024 (preoccupied)

Genus of mamenchisaurid sauropod

Jingiella is an extinct genus of mamenchisaurid sauropod dinosaur from the Late Jurassic Dongxing Formation of Guangxi, China. The genus contains a single species, J. dongxingensis, known from vertebrae and limb bones. The original description of Jingiella referred to it using the name "Jingia" which was preoccupied by a moth genus named in 1983, and an amendment was published shortly thereafter, establishing Jingiella as the new replacement name.

== Discovery and naming ==
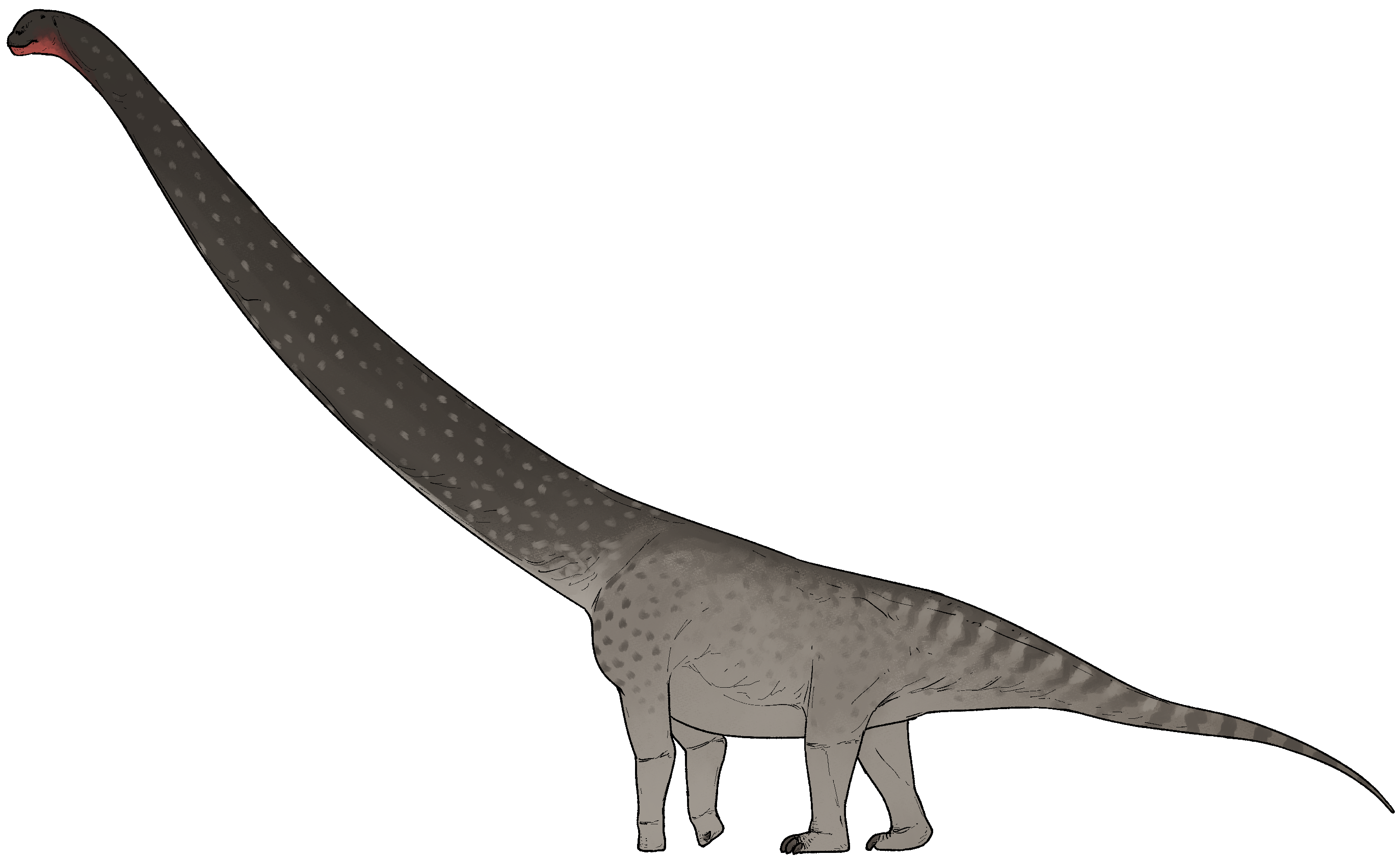
Life restoration

The Jingiella dongxingensis holotype specimen, DXJL2021001, was discovered in sediments of the Dongxing Formation in Dongxing town of Dongxing city in Guangxi Zhuang Autonomous Region, South China. The specimen consists of fragmentary remains, including partial dorsal, sacral, and caudal vertebrae, part of both ulnae, and the proximal end of the right femur. The bones were restored by the Chongzhou Tianyan Museum.

In 2024, Ren et al. proposed Jingia dongxingensis as a new genus and species of mamenchisaurid sauropod based on these fossil remains. The generic name, Jingia, was intended to honor Chinese people of the Jing Nationality who emigrated from Vietnam. The specific name, dongxingensis, references the type locality in Dongxing City, where many Jing people live. The genus name Jingia was preoccupied by a moth described in 1983. As such, a replacement name was needed. Ren et al. published an addendum shortly after the original description, amending the error and establishing Jingiella as the new generic name.

== Description ==
Jingiella exhibits a combination of characteristics of more basal, Omeisaurus-like mamenchisaurids and more derived, Mamenchisaurus-like mamenchisaurids. The neural arches of the dorsal vertebrae are relatively tall and narrow, with a neural spine height approximately 4.4 times their minimum width, more similar to Mamenchisaurus than Omeisaurus. The caudal vertebrae are amphicoelous, as in Omeisaurus and most other basal eusauropods, with distinctly concave anterior faces and shallowly concave posterior faces, unlike the procoelous caudal vertebrae in Mamenchisaurus.

== Classification ==
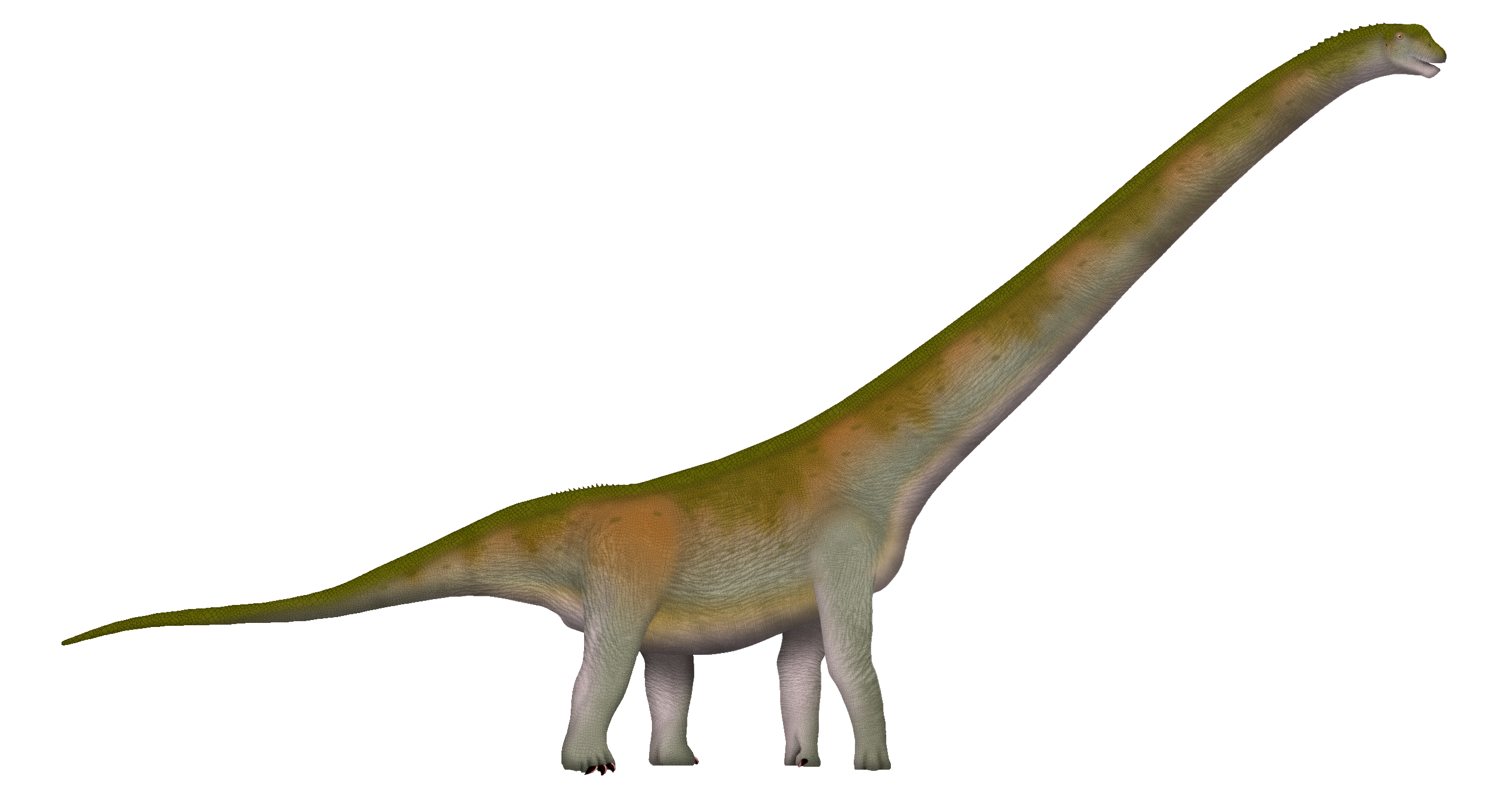
Life restoration

In their phylogenetic analyses, Ren et al. (2024) recovered Jingiella as a late-diverging member of Mamenchisauridae, as the sister taxon to the clade containing Mamenchisaurus youngi, Chuanjiesaurus, and Wamweracaudia. Their results are shown in the cladogram below:

- Mamenchisauridae
  - Spinophorosaurus
  - - Analong
    - - - Omeisaurus tianfuensis
        - Omeisaurus puxiani
      - - Rhoetosaurus
        - - Yuanmousaurus
          - - Jingiella
            - - Mamenchisaurus youngi
              - Chuanjiesaurus
              - Wamweracaudia
