= Dongxing Formation =

Geological formation in Guangxi, China

- Stratigraphic range: Upper Jurassic (Kimmeridgian?)
- Type: Geological formation

Location
- Region: Guangxi
- Country: China

The Dongxing Formation (Chinese: 东兴组) is a geological formation in Guangxi, China. It dates to the Late Jurassic. It is named for Dongxing County in Guangxi. It is made up of quartzitic arkose interbedded with purplish red mudstone. Jingiella dongxingensis, a species of sauropod dinosaur, is known from this formation.

== Fossil content ==
Color key: Taxon / Reclassified taxon / Taxon falsely reported as present / Dubious taxon or junior synonym / Ichnotaxon / Ootaxon / Morphotaxon	Notes; Uncertain or tentative taxa are in small text; ~~crossed out~~ taxa are discredited.

=== Dinosaurs ===
Genus	Species	Location	Stratigraphic position	Material	Notes	Images
Jingiella	J. dongxingensis			Dorsal, sacral, and caudal vertebrae, ulnae, and a femur	A mamenchisaurid sauropod	
