= Penglaizhen Formation =

Geological formation in Sichuan, China

- Stratigraphic range: Berriasian–Valanginian
- Type: Geological formation
- Underlies: Cangxi & Jiaguan Formations
- Overlies: Suining Formation

Location
- Region: Asia
- Country: China
- Extent: Sichuan Basin

The Penglaizhen Formation (simplified Chinese: 蓬莱镇组; traditional Chinese: 蓬萊鎮組; pinyin: Péngláizhèn Zǔ), is a geological formation in Sichuan, China. It was formerly thought to be Late Jurassic in age. The underlying Suining Formation has been dated to the Upper Aptian, about 114 Ma, which would suggest that the Penglaizhen Formation is Albian at the oldest. However, a subsequent study suggested that the dates for the Suining Formation have been altered by geologic processes. It dates the formation to the around the Jurassic-Cretaceous boundary, about 145 Ma, so the Penglaizhen Formation would likely be Berriasian or Valanginian in age. Dinosaur remains are among the fossils that have been recovered from the formation.

== Vertebrate paleofauna ==
Indeterminate ornithischian tracks have been recovered from Penglaizhen outcrops in Sichuan, China.

| Genus | Species | Presence | Notes | Images |
|---|---|---|---|---|
| Mamenchisaurus | M. anyuensis | Sichuan | | |
| ?Yangchuanosaurus | ?Y. "longqiaoensis" | Sichuan | Nomen nudum | |

== Plants ==
| Genus | Species | Presence | Notes | Images |
|---|---|---|---|---|
| Xenoxylon | X. shehongense | Sichuan | Fossil wood | |

== See also ==
- List of dinosaur-bearing rock formations
