= Suining Formation =

Geologic formation in China

- Stratigraphic range: ?Late Jurassic, ~145? Ma
- Type: Geological formation
- Unit of: Sichuan Basin
- Underlies: Penglaizhen Formation
- Overlies: Upper Shaximiao Formation
- Thickness: Several hundred meters

Lithology
- Primary: Mudstone
- Other: Sandstone, siltstone

Location
- Region: Asia
- Country: China

Type section
- Named by: Lee & Chen (1939)

The Suining Formation (simplified Chinese: 遂宁组; traditional Chinese: 遂寧組; pinyin: Suìníng Zǔ) is a geological formation in China whose strata likely date back to the Late Jurassic. Dinosaur remains are among the fossils that have been recovered from the formation.

== History ==
The Suining Formation was identified in 1939. The formation was initially dated to the Tithonian (Late Jurassic). A 2019 publication described zircons from the Suining Formation that implied a younger age, the average age being around 115.5–113.3 million years ago (Early Cretaceous, upper Aptian age). Later research suggested that a Late Jurassic age is more likely based on reinterpretations of the previous zircon-based ages and comparisons of the dinosaur and pollen fossils with other more confidently-dated formations.

== Paleobiota ==
=== Dinosaurs ===
==== Sauropods ====
Genus	Species	Presence	Materials	Notes	Images
Mamenchisaurus	M. anyuensis	Geographically located in Sichuan, China.		A mamenchisaurid	
Qijianglong	Q. guokr		A partial skeleton including cranial bones, most of the neck and tail, and other associated elements.	A mamenchisaurid	
Tongnanlong	T. zhimingi	Tongnan District in the Sichuan Basin	A holotype specimen, TNM 0254, consists of three dorsal and six caudal vertebrae, left shoulder girdle (scapula and coracoid), and hindlimb elements (partial tibia, fibula, three metatarsals, and two unguals).	One of the largest known mamenchisaurids	

=== Fish ===
Genus	Species	Presence	Notes	Images
Beiduyu	B. qijiangensis			
Ceratodus	C. szechuanensis			

=== Turtles ===
Genus	Species	Presence	Notes	Images
Plesiochelys	P. tatsuensis			

== See also ==
- Qijianglong
- List of dinosaur-bearing rock formations
