= Analong =

Analong Temporal range: Middle Jurassic, 170–168 Ma

Scientific classification
- Kingdom: Animalia
- Phylum: Chordata
- Class: Reptilia
- Clade: Dinosauria
- Clade: Saurischia
- Clade: †Sauropodomorpha
- Clade: †Sauropoda
- Family: †Mamenchisauridae
- Genus: †Analong; Ren et al. 2020

Type species
- †Analong chuanjieensis Ren et al. 2020

Genus of sauropod dinosaur (fossil)

Analong is an extinct genus of mamenchisaurid sauropod dinosaur from the Chuanjie Formation in Yunnan, China. The type and only species is Analong chuanjieensis.

== Discovery and naming ==
The fossils of Analong has a relatively convoluted history. The skeletons of two giant sauropods were discovered in 1995 by Tao Wang, who was working with the Lufeng Dinosaur Museum. The fossils were found in the village of A'na and the town of Chuanjie in the Lufeng County of Yunnan. The local villagers built a small shelter around the fossils because they could not be immediately excavated. They remained in situ for several years until 2000, when the two skeletons were described and given the name Chuanjiesaurus. One of these skeletons, given the specimen number Lfch 1001, was made the holotype of this new genus, and the other skeleton, given the specimen number LFGT LCD9701-1, was referred to the same genus and species. In 2008, the Lufeng World Dinosaur Valley exhibition was built around the skeletons. In 2011, the holotype and referred specimens of Chuanjiesaurus were given a full osteological description, which included an emended diagnosis for the genus and species. LFGT LCD9701-1 was reaffirmed as the same taxon as the holotype based on the anatomy of the caudal vertebrae.

In 2020, LFGT LCD9701-1 was re-examined by Xin-Xin Ren and colleagues. In this publication, Ren and colleagues determined that there were sufficient differences between LFGT LCD9701-1 and the holotype of Chuanjiesaurus were sufficient for them to erect a new genus and species to contain the specimen—Analong chuanjiensis. The genus name refers to the village of A'na and the suffix "-long" is a transliteration of the Mandarin word for "dragon". The specific epithet refers to the town of Chuanjie, where the fossils were unearthed.

== Description ==
The holotype of Analong is a partially complete skeleton lacking the skull. It includes 11 articulated cervical vertebrae, 8 dorsal vertebrae from the mid-posterior portion of the back, 4 or 5 sacral vertebrae, the first 24 caudal vertebrae with associated chevrons, several ribs, both pubic bones, the left ilium, a complete left forelimb, and the left femur. Analong can be distinguished from all other mamenchisaurids by several autapomorphies including: transverse processes on the first ten caudals, a 45 degree angle between two processes on the ulna, a metacarpal width 7% the width of the radius, and a pubis that is uniformly narrow along 40% of its distal width. Analong also has several synapomorphies including: bifid mid-caudal chevrons, a sub-equal length of the proximal condylar process of the ulna, and a weakly developed condyle of the anterior caudals.

== Classification ==
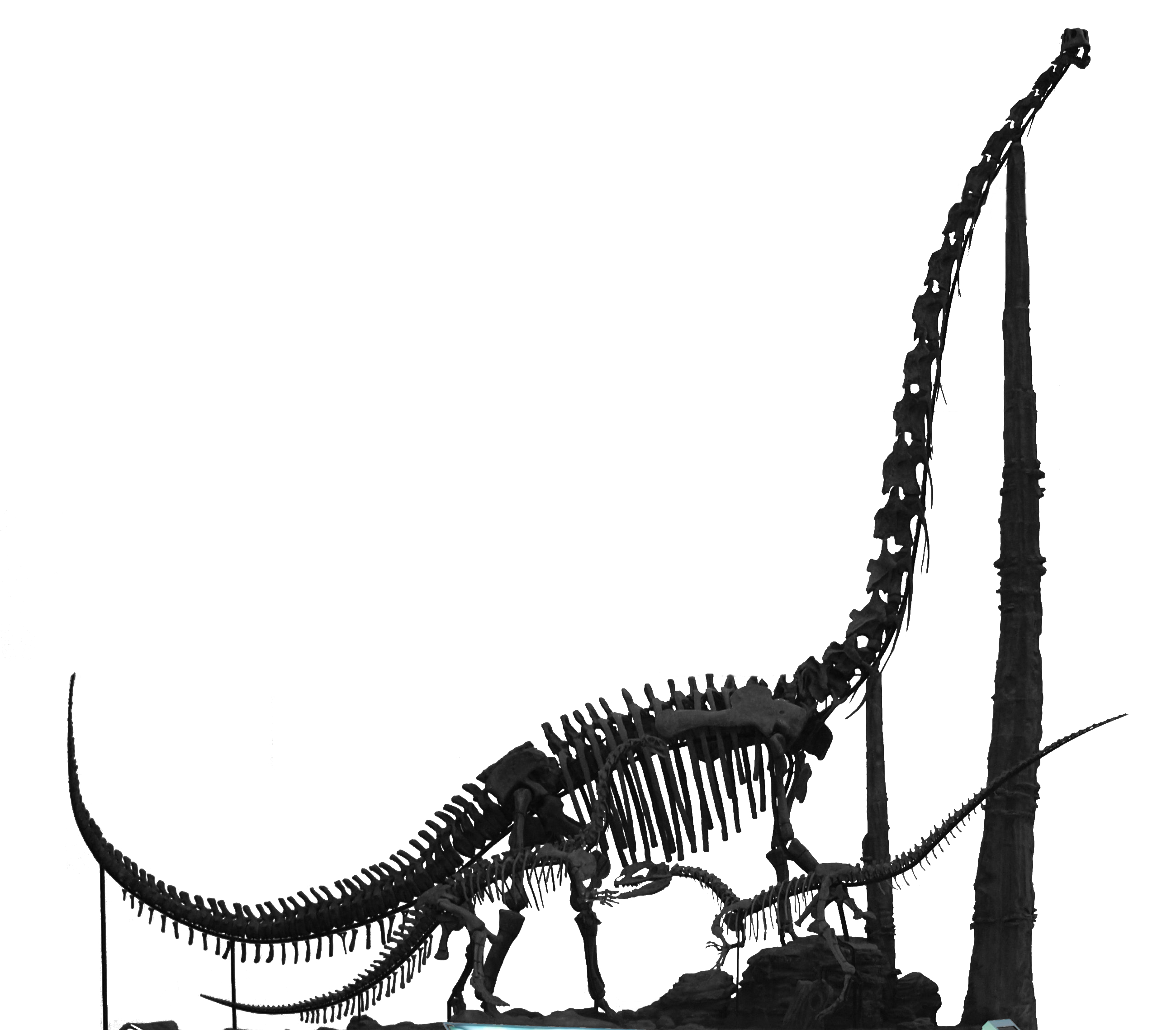
A skeletal mount of the closely related mamenchisaurid Chuanjiesaurus

In their initial description of Analong, Ren and colleagues found it as a basally-branching member of Mamenchisauridae. Subsequent authors have reaffirmed its affinities as a mamenchisaurid. A cladogram published by Moore and colleagues in 2023 illustrating the relationships of mamenchisaurids is shown below.

- Mamenchisauridae
  - Tienshanosaurus
  - - Omeisaurus
    - - Wamweracaudia
      - - Qijianglong
        - - Bellusaurus
          - M. constructus
          - - - Rhomaleopakhus
              - - Analong
                - Chuanjiesaurus
            - - M. youngi
              - - - M. hochuanensis (holotype)
                  - - Shishugou cervicodorsals
                    - - Phu Kradung taxon
                      - Klamelisaurus
                - - - M. sinocanadorum
                    - Xinjiangtitan
                  - - Hudiesaurus
                    - - Daanosaurus
                      - M. hochuanensis (referred)

== Paleoenvironment ==
The only known fossils of Analong were unearthed from the Chuanjie Formation in Yunnan. This formation is roughly 221 m (725 ft) thick and is composed of purple and red mudstones and siltstones interbedded with gray, green, and purple limestones. It unconformably overlies the Lufeng Formation and conformably underlies the Laoluocun Formation. This constrains the formation's age to the Middle Jurassic. Plant fossils from the area include pine and podocarp conifers. Invertebrates are also common and include a diverse assemblage of ostracod and bivalve remains. Vertebrate fossils from the formation include fragmentary turtle remains and fish scales alongside large dinosaurs (Shidaisaurus and Chuanjiesaurus) and the turtle Xinjiangchelys.

== See also ==
- 2020 in archosaur paleontology
- List of sauropod species
- List of sauropodomorph type specimens
- Yanliao Biota
