= Jingia =

Scientific classification
- Kingdom: Animalia
- Phylum: Arthropoda
- Clade: Pancrustacea
- Class: Insecta
- Order: Lepidoptera
- Superfamily: Noctuoidea
- Family: Noctuidae
- Genus: Jingia; Chen, 1983

Type species
- Jingia vestigialis Chen, 1983

Genus of moths

Jingia is a genus of moths in the family Noctuidae. The genus was named by Chen in 1983 and the type species is J. vestigialis.

In 2024, a sauropod dinosaur was given the same genus name, but a replacement name, Jingiella, was published later that year.
