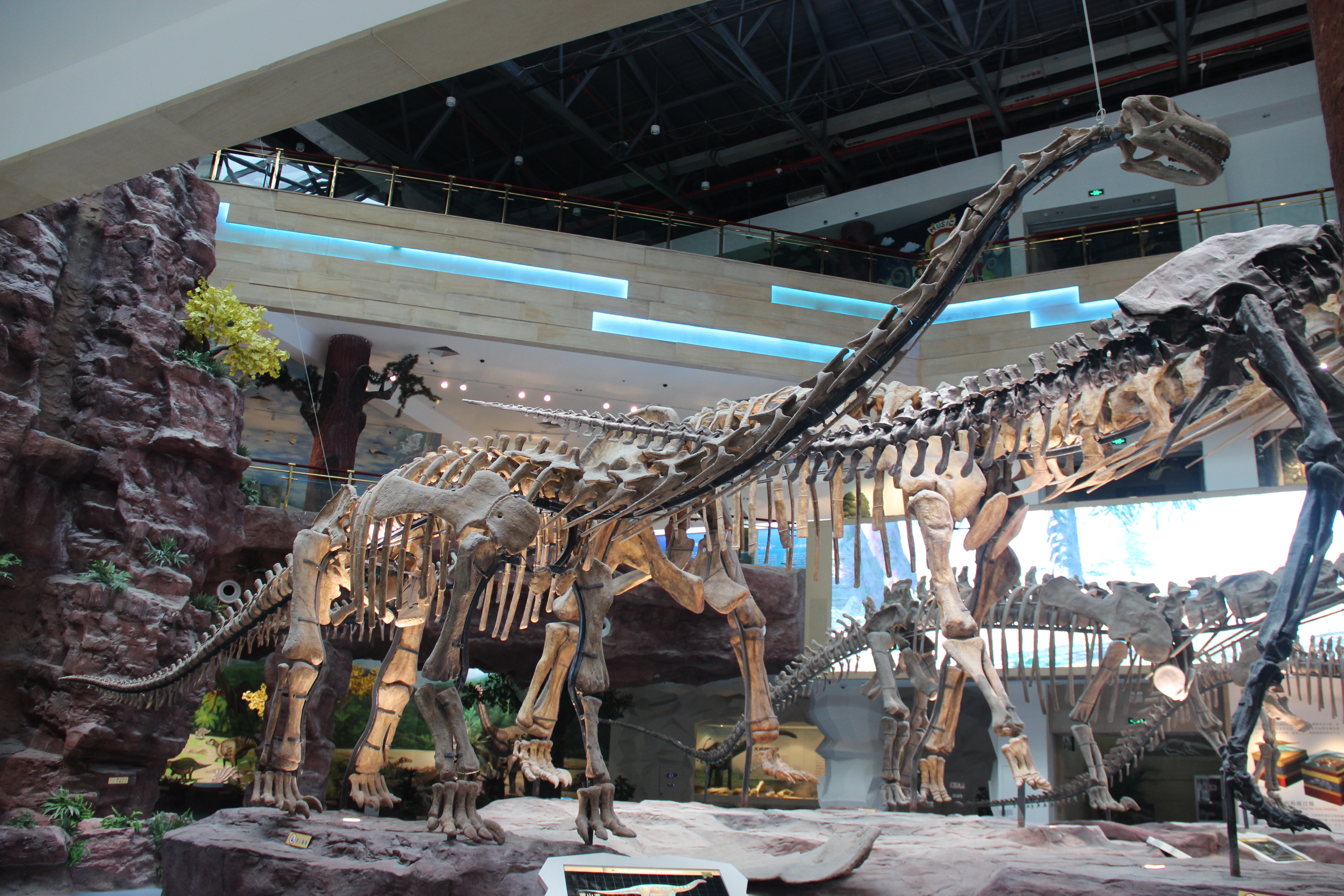
- Reconstructed skeleton, Anhui Geological Museum

Scientific classification
- Kingdom: Animalia
- Phylum: Chordata
- Class: Reptilia
- Clade: Dinosauria
- Clade: Saurischia
- Clade: †Sauropodomorpha
- Clade: †Sauropoda
- Family: †Mamenchisauridae
- Genus: †Huangshanlong; Huang et al., 2014

Type species
- †Huangshanlong anhuiensis Huang et al, 2014

= Huangshanlong =

Huangshanlong Temporal range: Middle Jurassic, 174–161 Ma

Extinct genus of dinosaurs

Huangshanlong (meaning "Huangshan dragon") is a genus of mamenchisaurid dinosaurs native to the Anhui province of China. It contains a single species, Huangshanlong anhuiensis, which represents, along with Anhuilong and Wannanosaurus, one of the three dinosaurs found in Anhui province.

== Discovery and description ==
The only specimen consists of a partial forelimb discovered in 2002 during the construction of the Huihang Highway. It can be distinguished from other mamenchisaurids in having the following unique combination of features: such as transverse length of the proximal end of the humerus is 36% of the total length of the humerus, accessory processes are located near the middle of the cranial edge of the distal end of the humerus, length of the radius is 58% of that of the humerus, length of the ulna is two thirds of that of the humerus, craniomedial process on the proximal end of the ulna is longer than the craniolateral one, and ridges develop on the cranial, caudomedial, and caudolateral faces of the distal portion of the ulna.

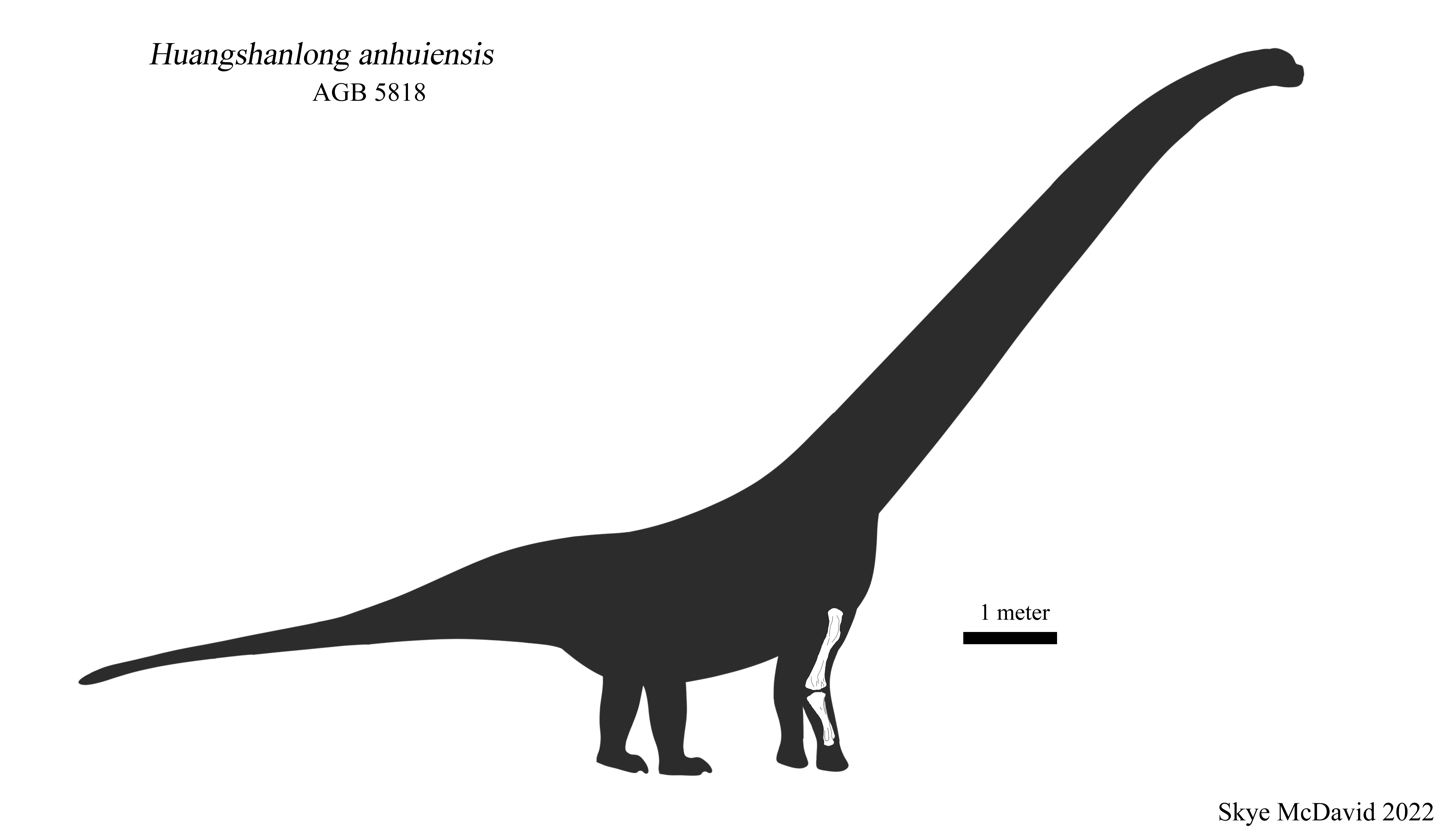
Skeletal diagram

Ren et al. (2018) recover Huangshanlong as sister to Anhuilong and Omeisaurus in a clade within Mamenchisauridae exclusive of other mamenchisaurids.
