= Qijianglong =

Qijianglong Temporal range: Late Jurassic or Early Cretaceous

Scientific classification
- Kingdom: Animalia
- Phylum: Chordata
- Class: Reptilia
- Clade: Dinosauria
- Clade: Saurischia
- Clade: †Sauropodomorpha
- Clade: †Sauropoda
- Family: †Mamenchisauridae
- Genus: †Qijianglong; Xing et al., 2015

Type species
- †Qijianglong guokr Xing et al., 2015

Genus of reptiles (fossil)

Qijianglong is a genus of herbivorous mamenchisaurid sauropod dinosaurs. It is known from the Suining Formation of China, which is of a debated age (reported as Late Jurassic or Early Cretaceous using different methods). The genus contains a single species, Qijianglong guokr, known from a partial skeleton including cranial bones, most of the neck and tail, and other associated elements.

== Discovery ==
A vertebra of Qijianglong was first discovered in the early 1990s by farmer Cai Changming of Heba village, Sichuan, in his backyard. Work at a nearby construction site at Qijiang District uncovered a rich fossil quarry in 2006. Its excavation caused an examination of the earlier find which led to the discovery of a skeleton. In 2015, the type species Qijianglong guokr was named and described by Xing Lida (China University of Geosciences), Tetsuto Miyashita (University of Alberta), Zhang Jianping, Li Daqing, Ye Yong (Zigong Dinosaur Museum), Toru Sekiya (Fukui Prefectural Dinosaur Museum), Wang Fengping and Philip John Currie. The generic name combines the district Qijiang with Mandarin long, "dragon". The specific name guokr, "nutshell", is that of a Chinese scientific social network.

The holotype specimen, QJGPM 1001, was found in a layer of the Suining Formation. The age of this formation is debated, with various methods supporting either a Late Jurassic or Early Cretaceous age. The specimen consists of a partial skeleton including the rear of the skull, a partial right lower jaw, a complete series of seventeen neck vertebrae, the first six back vertebrae, ribs, the probable tenth tail vertebra, a series of twenty-eight rear tail vertebrae, chevrons, the left pubic bone and two upper pedal phalanges. It likely represents a juvenile individual, large but immature.

The holotype of Qijianglong was about fifteen meters long and had a long neck. The describing authors established several distinguishing traits among which four autapomorphies. On the lower braincase the processus basipterygoideus has the form of a plate, is oriented along the body axis, and has an additional boss parallel to the tubera basilaria. The neck vertebrae have rear joint processes, postzygapophyses that next to their normal facets show on the outside an additional finger-shaped extension, stiffening the neck in the horizontal plane but allowing vertical movement. The rear neck vertebrae have pneumatopores, pneumatic openings, in the depression between the diapophysis, the upper rib joint process, and the neural spine. The pubic bone has a concave front edge, curving so strongly that its lower end is more directed to the front than to below.

== Systematics ==
Qijianglong was placed in the family Mamenchisauridae, in a relatively basal position but above Omeisaurus tianfuensis in the evolutionary tree.
