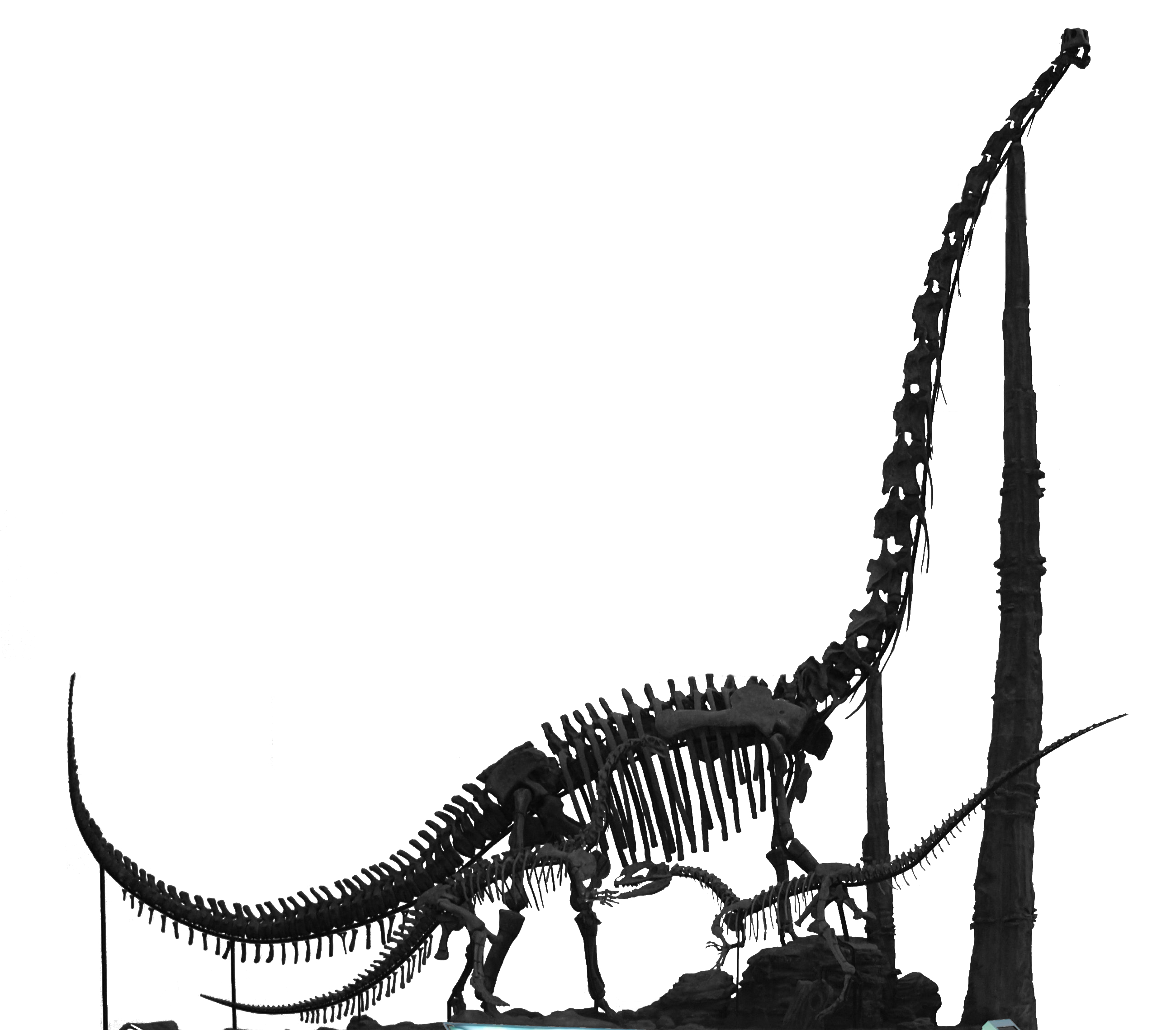
- Skeleton models of Chuanjiesaurus, Lufengosaurus and Sinosaurus, China Science and Technology Museum

Scientific classification
- Kingdom: Animalia
- Phylum: Chordata
- Class: Reptilia
- Clade: Dinosauria
- Clade: Saurischia
- Clade: †Sauropodomorpha
- Clade: †Sauropoda
- Family: †Mamenchisauridae
- Genus: †Chuanjiesaurus; Fang et al., 2000
- Species: †C. anaensis

Binomial name
- †Chuanjiesaurus anaensis Fang et al., 2000

= Chuanjiesaurus =

Chuanjiesaurus Temporal range: Middle Jurassic, 168 Ma

Extinct genus of dinosaurs

Chuanjiesaurus is a genus of sauropod dinosaurs from the middle Jurassic Period. They lived in what is now China. The type species, Chuanjiesaurus anaensis, was first described by Fang, Pang, Lü, Zhang, Pan, Wang, Li and Cheng in 2000. Fossils of the species were found in the village of Chuanjie, Lufeng County, Yunnan Province, (in Chuanjie Formation deposits) and are named after the location where the fossils were discovered. Holtz gave a length of 25 meters (82 ft).

Size comparison

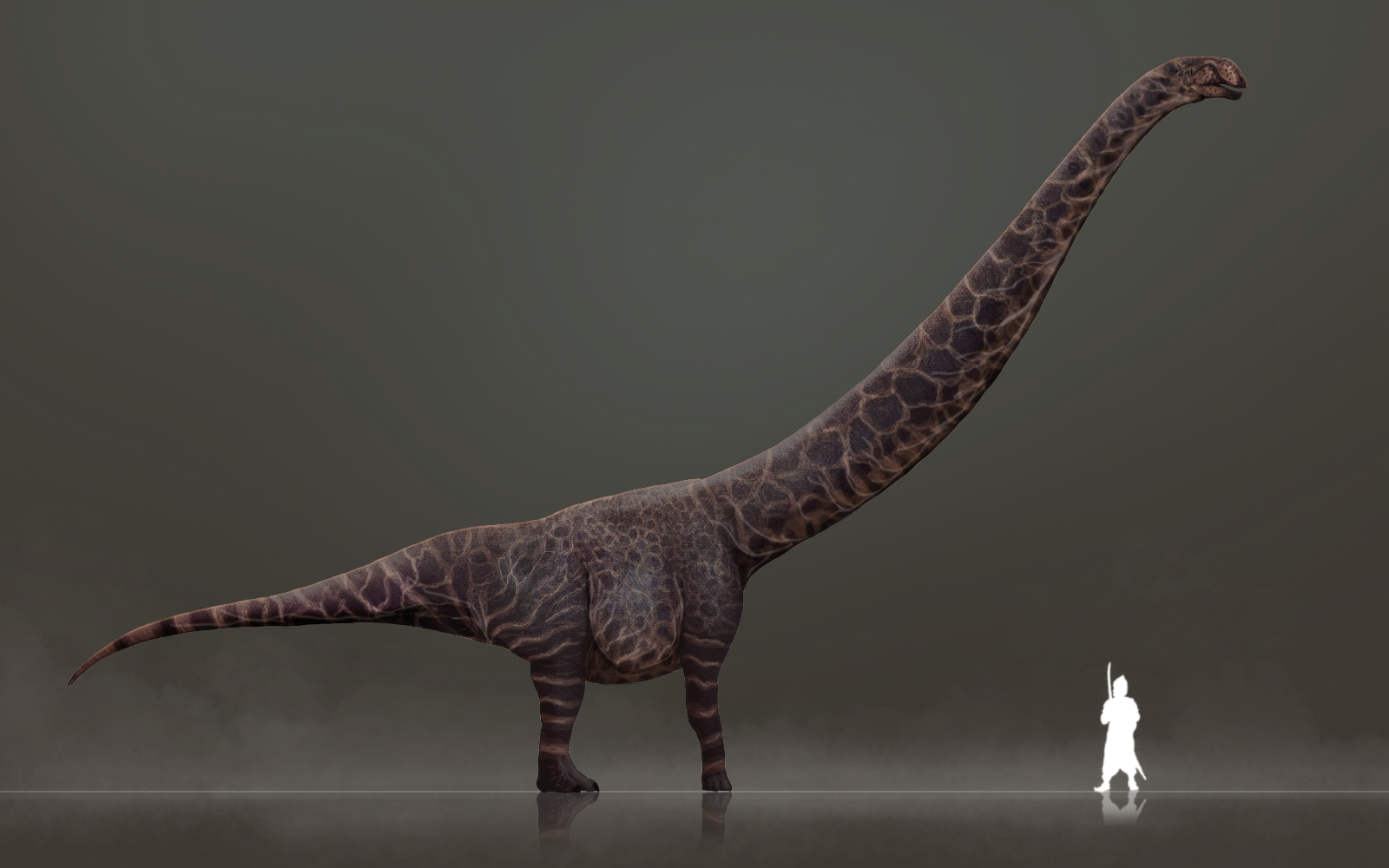
Life restoration with a human for scale
