= List of sauropod species =

Sauropoda is a clade of dinosaurs that consists of roughly 300 species of large, long-necked herbivores and includes the largest terrestrial animals ever to exist. The first sauropod species were named in 1842 by Richard Owen, though at the time, he regarded them as unusual crocodilians. Sauropoda was named in 1878 by Othniel Marsh.

== Scope ==
For historical value, this list includes every sauropod species that has been formally named, regardless of whether the species is currently considered to be valid. Invalid species (i.e., species that are regarded as dubious or as a junior synonym of another species) are given a darker gray background.

- Mussaurus
- - Aardonyx
  - - Melanorosaurus (paraphyletic)
    - - Blikanasaurus
      - - Camelotia
        - - - Lessemsaurus
            - Antetonitrus
          - - Leonerasaurus
            - - Gongxianosaurus
              - - Pulanesaura
                - - Vulcanodon
                  - Tazoudasaurus
                  - Isanosaurus
                  - Eusauropoda

Phylogenetic relationships of near-sauropod sauropodomorphs according to McPhee and Choiniere 2018, with Sauropoda sensu lato highlighted in pink and Sauropoda sensu stricto highlighted in red to show the difference between the two definitions

The precise definition of Sauropoda is disputed. One proposed dividing line is to consider as sauropods all species more closely related to derived sauropods than Melanorosaurus, one of the most sauropod-like taxa historically classified as a "prosauropod". The other is to exclude from Sauropoda any species more distantly related to derived sauropods than Vulcanodon, one of the earliest and most basal taxa historically accepted as a sauropod. This leaves an interval of species more closely related to derived sauropods than Melanorosaurus but not so closely as Vulcanodon that are sauropods under one definition but not the other. Many characteristics of sauropods, such as opisthocoelous cervical vertebrae and columnar limbs, evolved within this transitional region, so that species within it may exhibit a combination of characteristics regarded as sauropod-like or non-sauropod-like.

For the purposes of this list, species whose phylogenetic position may fall within the interval between Melanorosaurus and Vulcanodon, or whose status as a sauropod is otherwise regarded as uncertain, are listed separately from unambiguous sauropods.

The third section of this list covers species that were once classified as sauropods, but have been reidentified as belonging to other groups.

The fourth section of this list covers informally named sauropod species.

== Unambiguous sauropods ==
The following is a list of every species of sauropod that has ever been formally named, regardless of whether it is currently considered valid, dubious, or synonymous with another species. Invalid species are given a darker gray background. It does not contain species that have been recovered as basal to Vulcanodon by phylogenetic analysis, which are covered in a separate list below. The list contains the following information:

- Scientific name: The binomial name of the species, accompanied by a citation to the work in which the species was formally named.
- Status: The taxonomic status of the species, listing whether the species is currently regarded as valid, a nomen dubium, or as synonymous with another species.
- Authors: The list of people credited with naming the species.
- Date named: The date on which the species name is formally regarded as having first been published. According to the International Code of Zoological Nomenclature, only print publications and online works registered in ZooBank are considered to have been formally published, so the date given is the date recorded by ZooBank or the date of print publication, if different from the date of online publication.
- Parent clade: The most specific clade that the species is uncontroversially regarded as belonging to. When sorted, this column will place the clades in phylogenetic order, not alphabetical.
- Age: The geological age of the species in millions of years ago. Ranges generally indicate uncertainty, not the known duration of the species, so the range of ages listed does not imply that the species existed for the entire duration of that range. When a numerical age range is not directly available, it is converted from the date range of the reported chronostratigraphic units.
- Location: A list of countries where fossils of the species have been found. In the case of invalid species, only where the type specimen was found.
- Notes: Miscellaneous notes, including what the species was originally called, if its genus assignment has been changed.
- Skeletal diagram: A diagram showing a hypothetical silhouette of the animal, which bones are known of the species, and a size comparison if possible. For valid species, this may be a composite of multiple specimens, but for invalid species, this shows only the type specimen of the species.

List of sauropod species
Scientific name	Taxonomic status	Authors	Date named	Parent clade	Age	Location	Notes
Cetiosaurus longus Owen, 1842	Nomen dubium	Owen	1842		154.8–149.2 Ma; Late Jurassic: Kimmeridgian	United Kingdom	
Cetiosaurus medius Owen, 1842	Nomen dubium	Owen	1842	Sauropoda	161.5–143.1 Ma; Late Jurassic	United Kingdom	
Cetiosaurus brevis Owen, 1842	Unclear (Note: In 2004, Upchurch, Barrett, and Dodson listed Cetiosaurus brevis as a nomen dubium. In 2011, Upchurch, Mannion, and Barrett regarded Cetiosaurus brevis and Pelorosaurus conybeari to be objective synonyms and, based on both the caudal vertebrae associated with the name C. brevis and humerus associated with P. conybeari, regarded the taxon, which they called Pelorosaurus conybeari, to be a valid species.)	Owen	1842	Titanosauriformes	137.05–132.6 Ma; Early Cretaceous: Valanginian	United Kingdom	
Cardiodon rugulosus Owen, 1844	Nomen dubium	Owen	1844	Eusauropoda	174.7–161.5 Ma; Middle Jurassic	United Kingdom	
Cetiosaurus conybeari Melville, 1849	Objective junior synonym of Cetiosaurus brevis	Melville	1849	Titanosauriformes	137.05–132.6 Ma; Early Cretaceous: Valanginian	United Kingdom	
Pelorosaurus conybeari Mantell, 1850	Unclear (Note: Some authors have treated Cetiosaurus conybeari Melville, 1849 and Pelorosaurus conybeari Mantell, 1850 as distinct taxa, with the former being based on a series of four caudal vertebrae and the latter on a humerus. Others have regarded Pelorosaurus conybeari as simply Cetiosaurus conybeari assigned to a new genus. Among those who treated P. conybeari as having been named by Mantell and based on a humerus, Blows regarded P. conybeari as a nomen vanum and Upchurch et al. treated it as a valid taxon.)	Mantell	1850	Titanosauriformes	137.05–132.6 Ma; Early Cretaceous: Valanginian	United Kingdom	Treated as a distinct taxon from Cetiosaurus conybeari by some authors
Aepisaurus elephantinus Gervais, 1852	Nomen dubium	Gervais	1852	Sauropoda	113.2–100.5 Ma; Early Cretaceous: Albian	France	
Oplosaurus armatus Gervais, 1852	Valid	Gervais	1852	Eusauropoda	125.77–121.4 Ma; Early Cretaceous: Barremian	United Kingdom	
Haestasaurus becklesii (Mantell, 1852)	Valid	Mantell	1852	Eusauropoda	143.1–132.6 Ma; Early Cretaceous: late Berriasian–Valanginian	United Kingdom	Originally Pelorosaurus becklesii
Astrodon johnstoni Leidy, 1865	Nomen dubium	Leidy	May 1865	Titanosauriformes	121.4–113.2 Ma; Early Cretaceous: Aptian	United States	
Hypselosaurus priscus Matheron, 1869	Nomen dubium	Matheron	1869	Titanosauria	72.2–66 Ma; Late Cretaceous: Maastrichtian	France	
Macrurosaurus semnus Seeley, 1869	Nomen dubium	Seeley	1869	Titanosauriformes	113.2–100.5 Ma; Early Cretaceous: late Albian	United Kingdom	
Gigantosaurus megalonyx Seeley, 1869	Nomen dubium	Seeley	1869	Sauropoda	154.8–149.2 Ma; Late Jurassic: Kimmeridgian	United Kingdom	A chimera of sauropod and non-sauropod specimens
Ornithopsis hulkei Seeley, 1870	Valid	Seeley	1870	Titanosauriformes	125.77–121.4 Ma; Early Cretaceous: Barremian	United Kingdom	
Acanthopholis platypus Seeley, 1871	Nomen dubium	Seeley	1871	Titanosauriformes	113.2–100.5 Ma; Early Cretaceous: late Albian	United Kingdom	A chimera of sauropod and ankylosaur specimens
Cetiosaurus oxoniensis Phillips, 1871	Valid	Phillips	1871	Cetiosauridae	168.2–165.3 Ma; Middle Jurassic: Bathonian	United Kingdom	
Cetiosaurus glymptonensis Phillips, 1871	Valid	Phillips	1871	Diplodocoidea?		United Kingdom	
Morinosaurus typus Sauvage, 1874	Nomen dubium	Sauvage	1874	Sauropoda		France	
Duriatitan humerocristatus (Hulke, 1874)	Valid	Hulke	1874	Titanosauriformes	154.8–149.2 Ma; Late Jurassic: Kimmeridgian	United Kingdom	Originally Ceteosaurus humero-cristatus [sic]
Bothriospondylus suffossus Owen, 1875	Nomen dubium	Owen	1875	Neosauropoda	154.8–149.2 Ma; Late Jurassic: Kimmeridgian	United Kingdom	
Bothriospondylus elongatus Owen, 1875	Nomen dubium	Owen	1875	Sauropoda	143.1–132.6 Ma; Early Cretaceous: Berriasian–Valanginian	United Kingdom	
Bothriospondylus magnus Owen, 1875	Objective junior synonym of Ornithopsis hulkei	Owen	1875	Titanosauriformes	125.77–121.4 Ma; Early Cretaceous: Barremian	United Kingdom	
Bothriospondylus robustus Owen, 1875	Nomen dubium	Owen	1875	Macronaria	168.2–165.3 Ma; Middle Jurassic: Bathonian	United Kingdom	
Chondrosteosaurus gigas Owen, 1876	Nomen dubium	Owen	1876	Camarasauromorpha (Note: According to Naish and Martill, "sauropod experts seem in universal agreement that ʻC. gigasʼ is a camarasauromorph". Naish and Martill themselves regarded Chondrosteosaurus to be a camarasaurid; in contrast, Upchurch, Mannion, and Barrett regarded the specimen to be a titanosauriform.)		United Kingdom	
Iguanodon praecursor Sauvage, 1876	Nomen dubium	Sauvage	1876			France	
Titanosaurus indicus Lydekker, 1877	Nomen dubium	Lydekker	1877	Titanosauria		India	
Dystrophaeus viaemalae Cope, 1877	May be a nomen dubium	Cope	1877			United States	
Atlantosaurus montanus (Marsh, 1877)	Nomen dubium	Marsh	1877			United States	Originally Titanosaurus montanus (Note: Both Marsh and Lydekker named a sauropod genus Titanosaurus in 1877. Because Lydekker's Titanosaurus indicus was published first, Marsh renamed Titanosaurus montanus to Atlantosaurus montanus later that year.)
Camarasaurus supremus Cope, 1877	Valid	Cope	1877	Camarasauridae		United States	
Caulodon diversidens Cope, 1877	Subjective junior synonym of Camarasaurus supremus	Cope	1877	Camarasauridae		United States	
Amphicoelias altus Cope, 1877	Valid	Cope	Dec 10, 1877	Diplodocoidea	150.4–149.2 Ma; Late Jurassic: early Tithonian	United States	
Amphicoelias latus Cope, 1877	Subjective junior synonym of Camarasaurus supremus or C. grandis	Cope	Dec 10, 1877	Camarasauridae		United States	
Apatosaurus ajax Marsh, 1877	Valid	Marsh	Dec 1877	Apatosaurinae		United States	
Camarasaurus grandis (Marsh, 1877)	Valid	Marsh	Dec 1877	Camarasauridae		United States	Originally Apatosaurus grandis
Caulodon leptoganus Cope, 1878	Subjective junior synonym of Camarasaurus supremus	Cope	1878	Camarasauridae		United States	
Atlantosaurus immanis Marsh, 1878	Nomen dubium	Marsh	1878	Apatosaurinae		United States	
Morosaurus impar Marsh, 1878	Subjective junior synonym of Camarasaurus grandis.	Marsh	1878	Camarasauridae		United States	
Diplodocus longus Marsh, 1878	Disputed; either valid or nomen dubium (Note: In 2015, Tschopp, Mateus, and Benson argued that D. longus was a nomen dubium. In 2017, Carpenter disputed their claims regarding the status of D. longus)	Marsh	1878	Diplodocinae		United States	
Morosaurus robustus Marsh, 1878	Subjective junior synonym of Camarasaurus grandis	Marsh	1878	Camarasauridae		United States	
Maraapunisaurus fragillimus (Cope, 1878)	Disputed; may be valid or junior subjective synonym of Amphicoelias altus	Cope	1878	Rebbachisauridae?		United States	Originally Amphicoelias fragillimus. Only known specimen lost soon after publication.
Apatosaurus laticollis Marsh, 1879	Nomen dubium	Marsh	1879	Apatosaurinae		United States	
Brontosaurus excelsus Marsh, 1879	Valid	Marsh	1879	Apatosaurinae		United States	Known as Apatosaurus excelsus from 1903 to 2015
Camarasaurus leptodirus Cope, 1879	Subjective junior synonym of Camarasaurus supremus	Cope	1879	Camarasauridae		United States	
Titanosaurus blanfordi Lydekker, 1879	Nomen dubium	Lydekker	1879			India	
Brontosaurus amplus Marsh, 1881	Subjective junior synonym of Brontosaurus excelsus	Marsh	1881	Apatosaurinae		United States	
Ornithopsis eucamerotus Hulke, 1882	Nomen dubium	Hulke	1882			United Kingdom	
Diplodocus lacustris Marsh, 1884	Nomen dubium	Marsh	1884	Flagellicaudata		United States	
Dinodocus mackesoni Owen, 1884	Nomen dubium	Owen	1884	Macronaria		United Kingdom	
Neosodon; Moussaye, 1885	Nomen dubium	Moussaye	1885			France	No species name given.
Ornithopsis leedsii Hulke, 1887	Nomen dubium	Hulke	1887			United Kingdom	
Pleurocoelus nanus Marsh, 1888	Nomen dubium	Marsh	1888			United States	
Pleurocoelus altus Marsh, 1888	Nomen dubium	Marsh	1888			United States	
Ornithopsis manseli Lydekker, 1888	Nomen dubium	Lydekker	1888			United Kingdom	Originally Ischyrosaurus, with no species name given (Note: Originally described as Ischyrosaurus, without a species name, by John W. Hulke in 1874. Edward Drinker Cope had already named a genus Ischyrosaurus. In 1888, Lydekker assigned it to Ornithopsis, giving the species name as Ornithopsis manseli, which he credited to an unpublished manuscript by Hulke.)
Pleurocoelus valdensis Lydekker, 1889	Nomen dubium	Lydekker	1889	Titanosauriformes		United Kingdom	
Smitanosaurus agilis (Marsh, 1889)	Valid	Marsh	1889	Dicraeosauridae	152 Ma; Late Jurassic	United States	Originally Morosaurus agilis
Camarasaurus lentus (Marsh, 1889)	Valid	Marsh	1889	Camarasauridae		United States	Originally Morosaurus lentus
Barosaurus lentus Marsh, 1890	Valid	Marsh	1890	Diplodocinae		United States	
Argyrosaurus superbus Lydekker, 1893	Valid	Lydekker	1893	Titanosauria		Argentina	
Titanosaurus nanus Lydekker, 1893	Nomen dubium	Lydekker	1893			Argentina	
Microcoelus patagonicus Lydekker, 1893	Nomen dubium	Lydekker	1893			Argentina	Microsaurus and Microsaurops are erroneous names for Microcoelus.
Neuquensaurus australis (Lydekker, 1893)	Valid	Lydekker	1893	Saltasaurini		Argentina	Originally Titanosaurus australis
Bothriospondylus madagascariensis Lydekker, 1895	Potentially valid	Lydekker	1895	Eusauropoda	168.2–165.3 Ma; Middle Jurassic: Bathonian	Madagascar	
Titanosaurus madagascariensis Deperet, 1896	Nomen dubium	Deperet	1896			Madagascar	
Pleurocoelus montanus Marsh, 1896	Subjective junior synonym of Camarasaurus grandis	Marsh	1896	Camarasauridae		United States	
Clasmodosaurus spatula Ameghino, 1898	Nomen dubium	Ameghino	1898			Argentina	
Barosaurus affinis Marsh, 1899	Nomen dubium	Marsh	Mar 1899	Eusauropoda		United States	
Diplodocus carnegii Hatcher, 1901	Valid	Hatcher	1901	Diplodocinae	154.8–143.1 Ma; Late Jurassic: Kimmeridgian-Tithonian	United States	
Brontosaurus parvus (Peterson and Gilmore, 1902)	Valid	Peterson and Gilmore	May 1, 1902	Apatosaurinae	154.8–143.1 Ma; Late Jurassic: Kimmeridgian-Tithonian	United States	Originally Elosaurus parvus
Haplocanthosaurus priscus (Hatcher, 1903)	Valid	Hatcher	Feb 21, 1903	Haplocanthosauridae	154.8–143.1 Ma; Late Jurassic: Kimmeridgian-Tithonian	United States	Originally Haplocanthus priscus (Note: Hatcher incorrectly believed that Haplocanthus had to be changed because it was too similar to Haplacanthus Agassiz, 1845. Nonetheless, the name Haplocanthosaurus became widely used, and in 1991, the ICZN ruled to conserve the name Haplocanthosaurus.)
Haplocanthosaurus utterbacki Hatcher, 1903	Subjective junior synonym of Haplocanthosaurus priscus	Hatcher	1903	Haplocanthosauridae	154.8–143.1 Ma; Late Jurassic: Kimmeridgian-Tithonian	United States	
Brachiosaurus altithorax Riggs, 1903	Valid	Riggs	1903	Brachiosauridae	154.8–143.1 Ma; Late Jurassic: Kimmeridgian-Tithonian	United States	
Algoasaurus bauri Broom, 1904	Nomen dubium	Broom	1904	Eusauropoda	137.05–125.77 Ma; Early Cretaceous; Valanginian–Hauterivian	South Africa	
Tornieria africana (Fraas, 1908)	Valid	Fraas	1908	Diplodocinae		Tanzania	Originally Gigantosaurus africanus (Note: Gigantosaurus had to be renamed because Seeley had already used the name for a different sauropod)
Janenschia robusta (Fraas, 1908))	Valid	Fraas	1908	Eusauropoda		Tanzania	Originally Gigantosaurus robustus.
Dicraeosaurus hansemanni Janensch, 1914	Valid	Janensch	1914	Dicraeosauridae		Tanzania	
Dicraeosaurus sattleri Janensch, 1914	Valid	Janensch	1914	Dicraeosauridae		Tanzania	
Giraffatitan brancai (Janensch, 1914)	Valid	Janensch	1914	Brachiosauridae		Tanzania	Originally Brachiosaurus brancai
Brachiosaurus fraasi Janensch, 1914	Subjective junior synonym of Giraffatitan brancai	Janensch	1914	Brachiosauridae		Tanzania	
Magyarosaurus dacus (Nopcsa, 1915)	Valid	Nopcsa	1915			Romania	Originally Titanosaurus dacus
Apatosaurus louisae Holland, 1916	Valid	Holland	1916	Apatosaurinae		United States	
Apatosaurus minimus Mook, 1917		Mook	1917			United States	
Uintasaurus douglassi Holland, 1919	Subjective junior synonym of Camarasaurus lentus	Holland	1919	Camarasauridae		United States	
Amanzia greppini (Huene, 1922)	Valid	Huene	1922			Switzerland	Originally Ornithopsis (?) greppini
Alamosaurus sanjuanensis Gilmore, 1922	Valid	Gilmore	Jan 31, 1922			United States	
Galeamopus hayi (Holland, 1924)	Valid	Holland	1924	Diplodocinae		United States	Originally Diplodocus hayi
Asiatosaurus mongoliensis Osborn, 1924	Nomen dubium	Osborn	1924			Mongolia	
Rhoetosaurus brownei Longman, 1926	Valid	Longman	1926			Australia	
Malawisaurus dixeyi (Haughton, 1928)	Valid	Haughton	1928			Malawi	Originally Gigantosaurus dixeyi
Antarctosaurus giganteus Huene, 1929	Nomen dubium	Huene	1929			Argentina	
Antarctosaurus wichmannianus Huene, 1929	Valid	Huene	1929			Argentina	
Titanosaurus lydekkeri Huene, 1929	Nomen dubium	Huene	1929			United Kingdom	
Loricosaurus scutatus Huene, 1929	Nomen dubium	Huene	1929			Argentina	
Laplatasaurus araukanicus Huene, 1929	Valid	Huene	1929			Argentina	
Neuquensaurus robustus (Huene, 1929)	Nomen dubium	Huene	1929			Argentina	Originally Titanosaurus robustus
Campylodoniscus ameghinoi (Huene, 1929)	Nomen dubium	Huene	1929			Argentina	
Iuticosaurus valdensis (Huene, 1929)	Nomen dubium	Huene	1929			United Kingdom	
Euhelopus zdanskyi (Wiman, 1929)	Valid	Wiman	1929			China	
Magyarosaurus transsylvanicus Huene, 1932	Junior subjective synonym of Magyarosaurus dacus	Huene	1932			Romania	
Petrustitan hungaricus (Huene, 1932)	Valid	Huene	1932			Romania	Originally Magyarosaurus hungaricus
Aegyptosaurus baharijensis Stromer, 1932	Valid	Stromer	1932	Titanosauria	100.5–93.9 Ma; Late Cretaceous: Cenomanian	Egypt	
Mongolosaurus haplodon Gilmore, 1933	Valid	Gilmore	Dec 4, 1933	Titanosauria	121.4–100.5 Ma; Early Cretaceous: Aptian–Albian	China	
Jainosaurus septentrionalis (Huene & Matley, 1933)	Valid	Huene and Matley	1933			India	
Austrosaurus mckillopi Longman, 1933	Valid	Longman	1933	Somphospondyli?	113.2–100.5 Ma; Early Cretaceous: late Albian	Australia	
Tienshanosaurus chitaiensis Young, 1937	Nomen dubium	Young	1937			China	
Antarctosaurus jaxarticus Riabinin, 1938	Nomen dubium	Riabinin	1938			Kazakhstan	
Omeisaurus junghsiensis Young, 1939	Valid	Young	1939			China	
Titanosaurus falloti Hoffet, 1942	Nomen dubium	Hoffet	1942			Laos	
Sanpasaurus yaoi Young, 1944	Valid	Young	1944			China	
Camarasaurus annae Ellinger, 1950	Subjective junior synonym of Camarasaurus lentus.	Ellinger	1950	Camarasauridae		United States	
Chiayusaurus lacustris Bohlin, 1953	Nomen dubium	Bohlin	1953			China	
Mamenchisaurus constructus Young, 1954	Valid	Young	1954			China	
Rebbachisaurus garasbae Lavocat, 1954	Valid	Lavocat	1954			Morocco	
Cetiosaurus mogrebensis Lapparent, 1955	Nomen dubium	Lapparent	1955			Morocco	
Lusotitan atalaiensis (Lapparent & Zbyszewski, 1957)	Valid	Lapparent and Zbyszewski	1957			Portugal	Originally Brachiosaurus atalaiensis
Lourinhasaurus alenquerensis (Lapparent & Zbyszewski, 1957)	Valid	Lapparent and Zbyszewski	1957			Portugal	Originally Apatosaurus alenquerensis
Mamenchisaurus changshouensis (Young, 1958)	Nomen dubium	Young	1958			China	Originally Omeisaurus changshouensis (Note: In 1988, He et al. regarded it as uncertain whether O. changshouensis belonged to Omeisaurus or Mamenchisaurus. In 1996, Zhang and Chen referred O. changshouensis to Mamenchisaurus in 1996. In 2019, Tan et al. used the name Omeisaurus changshouensis but regarded it as more like Mamenchisaurus than Omeisaurus)
Brachiosaurus nougaredi Lapparent, 1960	Nomen dubium	Lapparent	1960			Algeria	
Rebbachisaurus tamesnensis Lapparent, 1960	Nomen dubium	Lapparent	1960			Niger	
Nemegtosaurus mongoliensis Nowinski, 1971	Valid	Nowinski	1971			Mongolia	
Antarctosaurus brasiliensis Arid & Vizotto, 1971	Nomen dubium	Arid and Vizotto	1971			Brazil	
Mamenchisaurus hochuanensis Young & Zhao, 1972	Valid	Young and Zhao	1972			China	
Vulcanodon karibaensis Raath, 1972	Valid	Raath	Jul 31, 1972	Vulcanodontidae	199.5–184.2 Ma; Early Jurassic: Sinemurian–Pliensbachian	Zimbabwe	
Asiatosaurus kwangshiensis Hou et al., 1975	Nomen dubium	Hou, Yeh, and Zhao	1975			China	
Barapasaurus tagorei Jain et al., 1975	Valid	Jain, Kutty, Roy-Chowdhury, and Chatterjee	1975			India	
Chubutisaurus insignis Del Corro, 1975	Valid	Del Corro	1975			Argentina	
Zigongosaurus fuxiensis Hou et al., 1976		Hou, Zhao, and Chao	1976			China	
Opisthocoelicaudia skarzynskii Borsuk-Białynicka, 1977	Valid; possibly a junior subjective synonym of Nemegtosaurus mongoliensis.	Borsuk-Białynicka	1977			Mongolia	
Nemegtosaurus pachi Dong, 1977	Nomen dubium	Dong	1977			China	
Ohmdenosaurus liasicus Wild, 1978	Valid	Wild	Dec 1, 1978			Germany	
Patagosaurus fariasi Bonaparte, 1979	Valid	Bonaparte	1979			Argentina	
Cetiosauriscus stewarti Charig, 1980	Valid	Charig	1980			United Kingdom	
Saltasaurus loricatus Bonaparte & Powell, 1980	Valid	Bonaparte and Powell	1980			Argentina	
Quaesitosaurus orientalis Kurzanov and Bannikov, 1983	Valid	Kurzanov and Bannikov	1983			Mongolia	
Ultrasaurus tabriensis Kim, 1983	Nomen dubium	Kim	1983			South Korea	
Zizhongosaurus chuanchengensis Dong et al., 1983	Nomen dubium	Dong, Zhou, and Zhang	1983			China	
Shunosaurus lii Dong et al., 1983	Valid	Dong, Zhou, and Zhang	1983			China	
Omeisaurus fuxiensis Dong et al., 1983	Nomen dubium	Dong, Zhou, and Zhang	1983	Mamenchisauridae		China	
Datousaurus bashanensis Dong & Tang, 1984	Valid	Dong and Tang	1984			China	
Omeisaurus tianfuensis He et al., 1984	Valid	He, Li, Cai, and Gao	1984			China	
Supersaurus vivianae Jensen, 1985	Valid	Jensen	1985	Diplodocinae		United States	
Ultrasauros mcintoshi (Jensen, 1985)	Subjective junior synonym of Supersaurus vivianae	Jensen	1985	Diplodocinae		United States	Originally Ultrasaurus mcintoshi (Note: Kim formally named a genus Ultrasaurus two years before Jensen did, so Ultrasaurus mcintoshi was renamed Ultrasauros.)
Dystylosaurus edwini Jensen, 1985	Subjective junior synonym of Supersaurus vivianae	Jensen	1985	Diplodocinae		United States	
Lapparentosaurus madagascariensis Bonaparte, 1986		Bonaparte	1986			Madagascar	
Bruhathkayosaurus matleyi Yadagiri & Ayyasami, 1987	Nomen dubium	Yadagiri and Ayyasami	1987			India	Only known specimens never collected and lost
Titanosaurus rahioliensis Mathur & Srivastava, 1987	Nomen dubium	Mathur and Srivastava	1987			India	
Aeolosaurus rionegrinus Powell, 1987	Valid	Powell	1987			Argentina	
Aragosaurus ischiaticus Sanz et al., 1987	Valid	Sanz, Buscalioni, Casanovas, and Santafé	1987			Spain	
Camarasaurus lewisi (Jensen, 1988)	Valid; possibly a junior subjective synonym of Camarasaurus grandis	Jensen	Apr 30, 1988	Camarasauridae		United States	Originally Cathetosaurus lewisi
Haplocanthosaurus delfsi McIntosh & Williams, 1988	Valid	McIntosh and Williams	Jul 1988	Haplocanthosauridae		United States	
Kotasaurus yamanpalliensis Yadagiri, 1988		Yadagiri	1988			India	
Protognathosaurus oxyodon (Zhang, 1988)	Nomen dubium	Zhang	1988			China	Originally Protognathus oxyodon (Note: The name Protognathus was preoccupied)
Omeisaurus luoquanensis Li in He et al., 1988	Nomen dubium	Li	1988			China	
Abrosaurus dongpoensis Ouyang, 1989		Ouyang	1989			China	
Epachthosaurus sciuttoi Powell, 1990	Valid	Powell	1990			Argentina	
Bellusaurus sui Dong, 1990	Valid	Dong	1990			China	
Amargasaurus cazaui Salgado & Bonaparte, 1991	Valid	Salgado and Bonaparte	1991	Dicraeosauridae		Argentina	
Diplodocus hallorum (Gillette, 1991)	Valid	Gillette	1991	Diplodocinae		United States	Originally Seismosaurus halli.
Andesaurus delgadoi Calvo & Bonaparte, 1991	Valid	Calvo and Bonaparte	1991			Argentina	
Dyslocosaurus polyonychius McIntosh et al., 1992	Valid	McIntosh, Coombs, and Russell	1992			United States	
Argentinosaurus huinculensis Bonaparte & Coria, 1993	Valid	Bonaparte and Coria	1993			Argentina	
Klamelisaurus gobiensis Zhao, 1993	Valid	Zhao	1993			China	
Mamenchisaurus sinocanadorum Russell & Zheng, 1994	Valid	Russell and Zheng	1994 (Note: Issue 10 of volume 30 of the Canadian Journal of Earth Sciences is dated October 1993, but was not actually available until February or March 1994)			China	
Phuwiangosaurus sirindhornae Martin et al., 1994	Valid	Martin, Buffetaut, and Suteethorn	1994			Thailand	
Brontosaurus yahnahpin Filla & Redman, 1994	Valid	Filla and Redman	1994			United States	Originally Apatosaurus yahnahpin
Eucamerotus foxi Blows, 1995	Valid	Blows	1995		129.4–125.0 Ma (Early Cretaceous: Barremian)	United Kingdom	Originally named Eucamerotus, with no species given, by John W. Hulke in 1871.
Ampelosaurus atacis Le Loeuff, 1995	Valid	Le Loeuff	1995			France	
Limaysaurus tessonei (Calvo & Salgado, 1995)	Valid	Calvo and Salgado	1995			Argentina	Originally Rebbachisaurus tessonei.
Mamenchisaurus youngi Pi et al., 1996	Valid	Pi, Ouyang, and Ye	1996			China	
Pellegrinisaurus powelli Salgado, 1996	Valid	Salgado	1996		83.6–66 Ma; Late Cretaceous: Campanian–Maastrichtian	Argentina	
Qinlingosaurus luonanensis Xue et al. in Xue et al., 1996	Nomen dubium	Xue, Zhang, and Bi	1996	Neosauropoda?	72.2–66 Ma; Late Cretaceous: Maastrichtian?	China	
Rayososaurus agrioensis Bonaparte, 1996	Valid	Bonaparte	1996			Argentina	
Mamenchisaurus anyuensis He et al., 1996	Valid	He, Yang, Cai, Li, and Liu	1996			China	
Isisaurus colberti (Jain & Bandyopadhyay, 1997)	Valid	Jain and Bandyopadhyay	1997			India	Originally Titanosaurus colberti
Chiayusaurus asianensis Lee et al., 1997	Nomen dubium	Lee, Yang, and Park	1997	Titanosauriformes	132.6–125.77 Ma; Early Cretaceous: Hauterivian	South Korea	
Hudiesaurus sinojapanorum Dong, 1997	Valid	Dong	1997		154.8–143.1 Ma; Late Jurassic: Kimmeridgian–Tithonian	China	
Sonorasaurus thompsoni Ratkevich, 1998	Valid	Ratkevich	1998			United States	
Histriasaurus boscarollii Dalla Vecchia, 1998	Valid	Dalla Vecchia	1998			Croatia	
Mamenchisaurus jingyanensis Zhang et al., 1998		Zhang, Li, and Zeng	1998			China	
Agustinia ligabuei Bonaparte, 1999	Valid	Bonaparte	1999	Rebbachisauridae		Argentina	
Tehuelchesaurus benitezii Rich et al., 1999	Valid	Rich, Vickers-Rich, Gimenez, Cúneo, Puerta, and Vacca	1999			Argentina	
Gondwanatitan faustoi Kellner & de Azevedo, 1999	Valid	Kellner and de Azevedo	1999			Brazil	
Jobaria tiguidensis Sereno et al., 1999	Valid	Sereno, Beck, Dutheil, Larsson, Lyon, Moussa, Sadleir, Sidor, Varricchio, Wilson, and Wilson	Nov 12, 1999			Niger	
Nigersaurus taqueti Sereno et al., 1999	Valid	Sereno, Beck, Dutheil, Larsson, Lyon, Moussa, Sadleir, Sidor, Varricchio, Wilson, and Wilson	Nov 12, 1999			Niger	
Cedarosaurus weiskopfae Tidwell et al., 1999	Valid	Tidwell, Carpenter, and Brooks	1999			United States	
Lirainosaurus astibiae Sanz et al., 1999	Valid	Sanz, Powell, Le Loeuff, Martinez, and Pereda Suberbiola	1999			Spain	
Dinheirosaurus lourinhanensis Bonaparte & Mateus, 1999	Valid	Bonaparte and Mateus	1999	Diplodocinae		Portugal	
Atlasaurus imelakei Monbaron et al., 1999	Valid	Monbaron, Russell, and Taquet	1999			Morocco	
Tangvayosaurus hoffeti Allain et al., 1999	Valid	Allain, Taquet, Battail, Dejax, Richir, Véran, Limon-Duparcemeur, Vacant, Mateus, Sayarath, Khentavong, and Phouyavong	1999			Laos	
Sauroposeidon proteles Wedel et al., 2000	Valid	Wedel, Cifelli, and Sanders	Mar 2000	Somphospondyli	121.4–100.5 Ma; Early Cretaceous: Aptian–Albian	United States	
Tendaguria tanzaniensis Bonaparte et al., 2000	Valid	Bonaparte, Heinrich, and Wild	Mar 2000			Tanzania	
Huabeisaurus allocotus Pang and Cheng, 2000	Valid	Pang and Cheng	Jun 2000			China	
Rocasaurus muniozi Salgado and Azpilicueta, 2000	Valid	Salgado and Azpilicueta	Sep 30, 2000			Argentina	
Chuanjiesaurus anaensis Fang et al., 2000	Valid	Fang, Long, Lü, Zhang, Pan, Wang, Li, and Cheng	2000	Mamenchisauridae		China	
Paralititan stromeri Smith et al., 2001	Valid	Smith, Lamanna, Lacovara, Dodson, Smith, Poole, Giegengack, and Attia	Jun 1, 2001			Egypt	
Rapetosaurus krausei Curry Rogers & Forster, 2001	Valid	Curry Rogers and Forster	Aug 2, 2001			Madagascar	
Jiangshanosaurus lixianensis Tang et al., 2001	Valid	Tang, Kang, Jin, Wei, and Wu	Oct 2001	Somphospondyli		China	
Omeisaurus maoianus Tang et al., 2001	Valid	Tang, Jin, Kang, and Zhang	Oct 2001	Mamenchisauridae		China	
Losillasaurus giganteus Casanovas et al., 2001	Valid	Casanovas, Santafé, and Sanz	2001	Turiasauria		Spain	
Pukyongosaurus milleniumi Dong et al., 2001	Nomen dubium	Dong, Paik, and Kim	2001	Titanosauriformes	121.4–113.2 Ma; Early Cretaceous: Aptian	South Korea	
Venenosaurus dicrocei Tidwell et al., 2001	Valid	Tidwell, Carpenter, and Meyer	2001			United States	
Amazonsaurus maranhensis Carvalho et al., 2003	Valid	Carvalho, Avilla, and Salgado	Dec 2003			Brazil	
Gobititan shenzhouensis You et al., 2003	Valid	You, Tang, and Luo	2003			China	
Ferganasaurus verzilini Alfanov & Averianov, 2003	Valid	Alifanov and Averianov	2003			Kyrgyzstan	
Mendozasaurus neguyelap González Riga, 2003	Valid	González Riga	2003			Argentina	
Rinconsaurus caudamirus Calvo & González Riga, 2003	Valid	Calvo and González Riga	2003			Argentina	
Borealosaurus wimani You et al., 2004	Valid	You, Ji, Lamanna, Li, and Li	2004			China	
Bonatitan reigi Martinelli & Forasiepi, 2004	Valid	Martinelli and Forasiepi	2004			Argentina	
Suuwassea emilieae Harris & Dodson, 2004	Valid	Harris and Dodson	2004	Dicraeosauridae		United States	
Tazoudasaurus naimi Allain et al., 2004	Valid	Allain, Aquesbi, Dejax, Meyer, Monbaron, Montenat, Richir, Rochdy, Russell, and Taquet	2004	Vulcanodontidae		Morocco	
Mamenchisaurus yunnanensis Fang et al., 2004	Nomen dubium	Fang, Zhao, Lu, and Cheng	Oct 2004	Mamenchisauridae		China	
Bashunosaurus kaijiangensis Kuang, 2004	Valid	Kuang	Nov 2004	Eusauropoda		China	
Shunosaurus jiangyiensis Fu & Zhang, 2004	Valid	Fu and Zhang	2004		174.7–161.5 Ma; Middle Jurassic	China	Probably does not belong to Shunosaurus
Bonitasaura salgadoi Apesteguía, 2004	Valid	Apesteguía	2004			Argentina	
Brachytrachelopan mesai Rauhut et al., 2005	Valid	Rauhut, Remes, Fechner, Cladera, and Puerta	Jun 2, 2005	Dicraeosauridae	152.1–145.0 Ma (Late Jurassic: Tithonian)	Argentina	
Daanosaurus zhangi Ye et al., 2005	Valid	Ye, Gao, and Jiang	Jul 2005			China	
Galveosaurus herreroi Sánchez-Hernández, 2005	Valid, but disputed whether Galveosaurus herreroi or Galvesaurus herreroi has priority as the correct name	Sánchez-Hernández	Aug 11, 2005		149.2–137.05 Ma; Late Jurassic to Early Cretaceous: Tithonian–Berriasian	Spain	Galveosaurus herreroi and Galvesaurus herreroi are based on the same skeleton but named by different authors, who have disputed which name is legitimate.
Galvesaurus herreroi Barco et al., 2005	Valid, but disputed whether Galveosaurus herreroi or Galvesaurus herreroi has priority as the correct name	Barco, Canudo, Cuenca-Bescós, and Ruiz-Omeñaca	2005 (Note: Exact date disputed. Article dated July 1, 2005, but copies apparently did not become available until December 18, 2005.)		149.2–137.05 Ma; Late Jurassic to Early Cretaceous: Tithonian–Berriasian	Spain	Galveosaurus herreroi and Galvesaurus herreroi are based on the same skeleton but named by different authors, who have disputed which name is legitimate.
Archaeodontosaurus descouensi Buffetaut, 2005	Valid	Buffetaut	2005			Madagascar	
Chebsaurus algeriensis Mahammed et al., 2005	Valid	Mahammed, Läng, Mami, Mekhali, Benhamou, Bouterfa, Kacemi, Chérief, Chaouati, and Taquet	2005			Algeria	
Puertasaurus reuili Novas et al., 2005	Valid	Novas, Salgado, Calvo, and Agnolin	2005			Argentina	
Dashanpusaurus dongi Peng et al., 2005	Valid	Peng, Ye, Gao, Shu, and Jiang	2005	Eusauropoda		China	
Karongasaurus gittelmani Gomani, 2005	Valid	Gomani	2005			Malawi	
Cathartesaura anaerobica Gallina & Apesteguía, 2005	Valid	Gallina and Apesteguía	2005			Argentina	
Baurutitan britoi Kellner et al., 2005	Valid	Kellner, Campos, and Trotta	2005			Brazil	
Trigonosaurus pricei Campos et al., 2005	Disputed; has been argued to be a junior subjective synonym of Baurutitan britoi but this is not accepted by all researchers	Campos, Kellner, Bertini, and Santucci	2005	Titanosauria	72.2–66 Ma; Late Cretaceous: Maastrichtian	Brazil	
Sonidosaurus saihangaobiensis Xu et al., 2006	Valid	Xu, Zhang, Tan, Zhao, and Tan	Feb 2006			China	
Yuanmousaurus jiangyiensis Lü et al., 2006	Valid	Lü, Li, Ji, Wang, Zhang, and Dong	Feb 2006			China	
Erketu ellisoni Ksepka & Norell, 2006	Valid	Ksepka and Norell	Mar 16, 2006			Mongolia	
Jiutaisaurus xidiensis Wu et al., 2006	Nomen dubium	Wu, Dong, Sun, Li, and Li	Mar 2006	Titanosauriformes	121.4–93.9 Ma; Cretaceous: Aptian–Cenomanian	China	
Europasaurus holgeri Mateus et al. in Sander et al., 2006	Valid	Mateus, Laven, and Knötschke	Jun 8, 2006		154.8–149.2 Ma; Late Jurassic: Kimmeridgian	Germany	
Maxakalisaurus topai Kellner et al., 2006	Valid	Kellner, Campos, de Azevedo, Trotta, Henriques, Craik, and de Paula Silva	Aug 11, 2006			Brazil	
Fusuisaurus zhaoi Mo et al., 2006	Valid	Mo, Wang, Huang, Huang, and Xu	Aug 2006			China	
Huanghetitan liujiaxiaensis You et al., 2006	Valid	You, Li, Zhou, and Ji	Sep 2006			China	
Turiasaurus riodevensis Royo-Torres et al., 2006	Valid	Royo-Torres, Cobos, and Alcalá	Dec 22, 2006		149.2–137.05 Ma; Late Jurassic to Early Cretaceous: Tithonian–Berriasian	Spain	
Adamantisaurus mezzalirai Santucci & Bertini, 2006	Valid	Santucci and Bertini	2006			Brazil	
Ligabuesaurus leanzai Bonaparte et al., 2006	Valid	Bonaparte, González Riga, and Apesteguía	2006			Argentina	
Zapalasaurus bonapartei Salgado et al., 2006	Valid	Salgado, Carvalho, and Garrido	2006			Argentina	
Aeolosaurus colhuehuapensis Casal et al., 2007	Valid	Casal, Martínez, Luna, Sciutto, and Lamanna	2007	Aeolosaurini		Argentina	
Muyelensaurus pecheni Calvo et al., 2007	Valid	Calvo, González-Riga, and Porfiri	2007	Rinconsauria		Argentina	
Australodocus bohetii Remes, 2007	Valid	Remes	2007	Somphospondyli		Tanzania	
Amargatitanis macni Apesteguía, 2007	Valid	Apesteguía	2007	Dicraeosauridae		Argentina	
Xenoposeidon proneneukos Taylor & Naish, 2007	Valid	Taylor and Naish	2007	Rebbachisauridae		United Kingdom	
Nopcsaspondylus alarconensis Apesteguía, 2007	Valid	Apesteguía	2007	Rebbachisauridae		Argentina	
Dongbeititan dongi Wang et al., 2007	Valid	Wang, You, Meng, Gao, Cheng, and Liu	2007			China	
Huanghetitan ruyangensis Lü et al., 2007	Valid	Lü, Xu, Zhang, Hu, Wu, Jia, and Ji	2007			China	
Paluxysaurus jonesi Rose, 2007	Junior subjective synonym of Sauroposeidon proteles	Rose	2007	Titanosauriformes		United States	
Futalognkosaurus dukei Calvo et al., 2007	Valid	Calvo, Porfiri, González-Riga, and Kellner	2007			Argentina	
Eomamenchisaurus yuanmouensis Lü et al., 2008	Valid	Lü, Li, Zhong, Ji, and Li	Feb 2008		174.7–161.5 Ma; Middle Jurassic	China	
Daxiatitan binglingi You et al., 2008	Valid	You, Li, Zhou, and Ji	Apr 2008			China	
Dongyangosaurus sinensis Lü et al., 2008	Valid	Lü, Azuma, Chen, Zheng, and Jin	Apr 2008			China	
Qingxiusaurus youjiangensis Mo et al., 2008	Valid	Mo, Huang, Zhao, Wang, and Xu	Apr 2008			China	
Pitekunsaurus macayai Filippi & Garrido, 2008	Valid	Filippi and Garrido	Sep 30, 2008			Argentina	
Tastavinsaurus sanzi Canudo et al., 2008	Valid	Canudo, Royo-Torres, and Cuenca-Bescós	Sep 2008		125.0–113.0 Ma (Early Cretaceous: early Aptian)	Spain	
Malarguesaurus florenciae González Riga et al., 2008	Valid	González Riga, Previtera, and Pirrone	2008 (Note: The issue is dated 2009, but the paleontologist Darren Naish reported that it was actually published in 2008.)		93.9–86.3 Ma (Late Cretaceous: Turonian–Coniacian)	Argentina	
Uberabatitan ribeiroi Salgado & Carvalho, 2008	Valid	Salgado and Carvalho	2008			Brazil	
Ruyangosaurus giganteus Lü et al., 2009	Valid	Lü, Xu, Jia, Zhang, Zhang, Yang, You, and Ji	Jan 2009			China	
Baotianmansaurus henanensis Zhang et al., 2009	Valid	Zhang, Lü, Xu, Li, Yang, Hu, Jia, Ji, and Zhang	Apr 2009			China	
Diamantinasaurus matildae Hocknull et al., 2009	Valid	Hocknull, White, Tischler, Cook, Calleja, Sloan, and Elliott	Jul 3, 2009			Australia	
Wintonotitan wattsi Hocknull et al., 2009	Valid	Hocknull, White, Tischler, Cook, Calleja, Sloan, and Elliott	Jul 3, 2009			Australia	
Barrosasaurus casamiquelai Salgado & Coria, 2009	Valid	Salgado and Coria	Sep 7, 2009			Argentina	
Spinophorosaurus nigerensis Remes et al., 2009	Valid	Remes, Ortega, Fierro, Joger, Kosma, Ferrer, Idé, and Maga	Sep 16, 2009			Niger	
Qiaowanlong kangxii You & Li, 2009	Valid	You and Li	Nov 22, 2009			China	
Xianshanosaurus shijiagouensis Lü et al., 2009	Valid	Lü, Xu, Jiang, Jia, Li, Yuan, Zhang, and Ji	2009			China	
Abydosaurus mcintoshi Chure et al., 2010	Valid	Chure, Britt, Whitlock, and Wilson	2010	Brachiosauridae		United States	
Tonganosaurus hei Li et al., 2010	Valid	Li, Yang, Liu, and Wang	2010	Mamenchisauridae		China	
Fukuititan nipponensis Azuma & Shibata, 2010	Valid	Azuma and Shibata	2010			Japan	
Panamericansaurus schroederi Porfiri & Calvo, 2010	Valid	Porfiri and Calvo	2010			Argentina	
Arkharavia heterocoelica Alifanov & Bolotsky, 2010	Nomen dubium	Alifanov and Bolotsky	2010	Somphospondyli		Russia	
Atsinganosaurus velauciensis Garcia et al., 2010	Valid	Garcia, Amico, Fournier, Thouand, and Valentin	2010			France	
Liubangosaurus hei Mo et al., 2010	Valid	Mo, Xu, and Buffetaut	2010			China	
Paludititan nalatzensis Csiki et al., 2010	Valid	Csiki, Codrea, Jipa-Murzea, and Godefroit	2010			Romania	
Demandasaurus darwini Fernández-Baldor et al., 2011	Valid	Fernández-Baldor, Canudo, Huerta, Montero, Pereda Suberbiola, and Salgado	2011			Spain	
Omeisaurus jiaoi Jiang et al., 2011	Valid	Jiang, Li, Peng, and Ye	2011			China	
Brontomerus mcintoshi Taylor et al., 2011	Nomen dubium	Taylor, Wedel, and Cifelli	2011	Somphospondyli		United States	
Angolatitan adamastor Mateus et al., 2011	Valid	Mateus, Jacobs, Schulp, Polcyn, Tavares, Buta Neto, Morais, and Antunes	2011			Angola	
Narambuenatitan palomoi Filippi et al., 2011	Valid	Filippi, García, and Garrido	2011			Argentina	
Drusilasaura deseadensis Navarrete et al., 2011	Valid	Navarrete, Casal, and Martínez	2011			Argentina	
Petrobrasaurus puestohernandezi Filippi et al., 2011	Valid	Filippi, Canudo, Salgado, Garrido, García, Cerda, and Otero	2011			Argentina	
Arrudatitan maximus (Santucci & de Arruda-Campos, 2011)	Valid	Santucci and de Arruda-Campos	Oct 31, 2011			Brazil	Originally Aeolosaurus maximus
Traukutitan eocaudata Juárez Valieri & Calvo, 2011	Valid	Juárez Valieri and Calvo	2011			Argentina	
Tapuiasaurus macedoi Zaher et al., 2011	Valid	Zaher, Pol, Carvalho, Nascimento, Riccomini, Larson, Juarez-Valieri, Pires-Domingues, da Silva, and de Almeida Campos	2011			Brazil	
Atacamatitan chilensis Kellner et al., 2011	Valid	Kellner, Rubilar-Rogers, Vargas, and Suárez	2011			Chile	
Rugocaudia cooneyi Woodruff, 2012	Nomen dubium	Woodruff	2012	Titanosauriformes		United States	
Elaltitan lilloi Mannion & Otero, 2012	Valid	Mannion and Otero	2012			Argentina	
Comahuesaurus windhauseni Carballido et al., 2012	Valid	Carballido, Salgado, Pol, Canudo, and Garrido	2012			Argentina	
Astrophocaudia slaughteri D'Emic, 2012	Valid	D'Emic	Nov 30, 2012		113.2–100.5 Ma; Early Cretaceous: early Albian	United States	
Kaatedocus siberi Tschopp & Mateus, 2012	Valid	Tschopp and Mateus	Dec 14, 2012	Flagellicaudata (Note: Originally described as a diplodocid, and recovered as such by Tschopp et al. in 2015 and Tschopp and Mateus in 2017. In contrast, recovered as a dicraeosaurid by Whitlock and Wilson Mantilla in 2020.)	154.8–143.1 Ma; Late Jurassic: Late Kimmeridgian–early Tithonian	United States	
Katepensaurus goicoecheai Ibiricu et al., 2013	Valid	Ibiricu, Casal, Martínez, Lamanna, Luna, and Salgado	2013			Argentina	
Tataouinea hannibalis Fanti et al., 2013	Valid	Fanti, Cau, Hassine, and Contessi	2013			Tunisia	
Gannansaurus sinensis Lü et al., 2013	Valid	Lü, Yi, Zhong, and Wei	Jun 2013	Somphospondyli	72.2–66 Ma; Late Cretaceous: Maastrichtian	China	
Yunmenglong ruyangensis Lü et al., 2013	Valid	Lü, Xu, Pu, Zhang, Zhang, Jia, Chang, Zhang, and Wei	2013			China	
Xinjiangtitan shanshanesis Wu et al., 2013	Valid	Wu, Zhou, Wings, Sekiya, and Dong	2013			China	
Overosaurus paradasorum Coria et al., 2013	Valid	Coria, Filippi, Chiappe, García, and Arcucci	2013			Argentina	
Normanniasaurus genceyi Le Loeuff et al., 2013	Valid	Le Loeuff, Suteethorn, and Buffetaut	2013			France	
Brasilotitan nemophagus Machado et al., 2013	Valid	Machado, Avilla, Nava, Campos, and Kellner	2013			Brazil	
Yongjinglong datangi Li et al., 2014	Valid	Li, Li, You, and Dodson	Jan 29, 2014			China	
Quetecsaurus rusconii González Riga & Ortiz David, 2014	Valid	González Riga and Ortiz David	Feb 14, 2014			Argentina	
Leinkupal laticauda Gallina et al., 2014	Valid	Gallina, Apesteguía, Haluza, and Canale	May 14, 2014	Diplodocinae		Argentina	
Tambatitanis amictiae Saegusa & Ikeda, 2014	Valid	Saegusa and Ikeda	Aug 12, 2014			Japan	
Dreadnoughtus schrani Lacovara et al., 2014	Valid	Lacovara, Lamanna, Ibiricu, Poole, Schroeter, Ullmann, Voegele, Boles, Carter, Fowler, Egerton, Moyer, Cougenour, Schein, Harris, Martínez, and Novas	Sep 4, 2014			Argentina	
Huangshanlong anhuiensis Huang et al., 2014	Valid	Huang, You, Yang, and Ren	Oct 2014			China	
Zby atlanticus Mateus et al., 2014	Valid	Mateus, Mannion, and Upchurch	2014			Portugal	
Vahiny depereti Curry Rogers & Wilson, 2014	Valid	Curry Rogers and Wilson	2014			Madagascar	
Rukwatitan bisepultus Gorscak et al., 2014	Valid	Gorscak, O'Connor, Stevens, and Roberts	2014			Tanzania	
Qijianglong guokr Xing et al., 2015	Valid	Xing, Miyashita, Zhang, Li, Ye, Sekiya, Wang, and Currie	2015			China	
Padillasaurus leivaensis Carballido et al., 2015	Valid	Carballido, Pol, Parra Ruge, Padilla Bernal, Páramo-Fonseca, and Etayo-Serna	2015			Colombia	
Nebulasaurus taito Xing et al., 2015	Valid	Xing, Miyashita, Currie, You, Zhang, and Dong	2015			China	
Notocolossus gonzalezparejasi González Riga et al., 2016	Valid	González Riga, Lamanna, Ortiz David, Calvo, and Coria	Jan 18, 2016			Argentina	
Sarmientosaurus musacchioi Martínez et al., 2016	Valid	Martínez, Lamanna, Novas, Ridgely, Casal, Martínez, Vita, and Witmer	Apr 26, 2016			Argentina	
Austroposeidon magnificus Bandeira et al., 2016	Valid	Bandeira, Medeiros Simbras, Batista Machado, de Almeida Campos, Oliveira, and Kellner	Oct 5, 2016			Brazil	
Savannasaurus elliottorum Poropat et al., 2016	Valid	Poropat, Mannion, Upchurch, Hocknull, Kear, Kundrát, Tischler, Sloan, Sinapius, Elliott, and Elliott	Oct 20, 2016			Australia	
Lohuecotitan pandafilandi Díez Díaz et al., 2016	Valid	Díez Díaz, Mocho, Páramo, Escaso, Marcos-Fernández, Sanz, and Ortega	Dec 31, 2016			Spain	
Moabosaurus utahensis Britt et al., 2017	Valid	Britt, Scheetz, Whiting, and Wilhite	Apr 10, 2017			United States	
Galeamopus pabsti Tschopp & Mateus, 2017	Valid	Tschopp and Mateus	May 2, 2017	Diplodocinae		United States	
Vouivria damparisensis Mannion et al., 2017	Valid	Mannion, Allain, and Moine	May 2, 2017			France	
Europatitan eastwoodi Torcida Fernández-Baldor et al. 2017	Valid	Torcida Fernández-Baldor, Canudo, Huerta, Moreno-Azanza, and Montero	Jun 27, 2017			Spain	
Patagotitan mayorum Carballido et al., 2017	Valid	Carballido, Pol, Otero, Cerda, Salgado, Garrido, Ramezani, Cúneo, and Krause	Aug 16, 2017			Argentina	
Shingopana songwensis Gorscak et al., 2017	Valid	Gorscak, O'Connor, Roberts, and Stevens	Aug 24, 2017			Tanzania	
Zhuchengtitan zangjiazhuangensis Mo et al., 2017	Valid	Mo, Wang, Chen, Wang, and Xu	Sep 2017			China	
Mierasaurus bobyoungi Royo-Torres et al., 2017	Valid	Royo-Torres, Upchurch, Kirkland, DeBlieux, Foster, Cobos, and Alcalá	Oct 30, 2017			United States	
Soriatitan golmayensis Royo-Torres et al., 2017	Valid	Royo-Torres, Fuentes, Meijide, Meijide-Fuentes, and Meijide-Fuentes	2017			Spain	
Triunfosaurus leonardii Carvalho et al., 2017	Valid	Carvalho, Salgado, Lindoso, de Araújo-Júnior, Costa Nogueira, and Soares	2017			Argentina	
Tengrisaurus starkovi Averianov & Skutschas, 2017	Valid	Averianov and Skutschas	2017			Russia	
Mansourasaurus shahinae Sallam et al., 2018	Valid	Sallam, Gorscak, O'Connor, El-Dawoudi, El-Sayed, Saber, Kora, Sertich, Seiffert, and Lamanna	Jan 29, 2018			Egypt	
Choconsaurus baileywillisi Simón et al., 2018	Valid	Simón, Salgado, and Otero	Feb 21, 2018			Argentina	
Liaoningotitan sinensis Zhou et al., 2018	Valid	Zhou, Wu, Sekiya, and Dong	Jun 2018			China	
Lingwulong shenqi Xu et al., 2018	Valid	Xu, Upchurch, Mannion, Barrett, Regalado-Fernandez, Mo, Ma, and Liu	Jul 24, 2018			China	
Volgatitan simbirskiensis Averianov & Efimov, 2018	Valid	Averianov and Efimov	Nov 30, 2018			Russia	
Baalsaurus mansillai Calvo & González Riga, 2018	Valid	Calvo and González Riga	Dec 17, 2018			Argentina	
Sibirotitan astrosacralis Averianov et al., 2018	Valid	Averianov, Ivantsov, Skutschas, Faingertz, and Leschinskiy	2018			Russia	
Lavocatisaurus agrioensis Canudo et al., 2018	Valid	Canudo, Carballido, Salgado, and Garrido	2018			Argentina	
Wamweracaudia keranjei Mannion et al., 2019	Valid	Mannion, Upchurch, Schwarz, and Wings	Jan 25, 2019	Mamenchisauridae		Tanzania	
Pilmatueia faundezi Coria et al., 2019	Valid	Coria, Windholz, Ortega, and Currie	Jan 2019	Dicraeosauridae		Argentina	
Bajadasaurus pronuspinax Gallina et al., 2019	Valid	Gallina, Apesteguía, Canale, and Haluza	Feb 4, 2019	Dicraeosauridae		Argentina	
Mnyamawamtuka moyowamkia Gorscak & O'Connor, 2019	Valid	Gorscak and O'Connor	Feb 13, 2019			Tanzania	
Oceanotitan dantasi Mocho et al., 2019	Valid	Mocho, Royo-Torres, and Ortega	May 15, 2019			Portugal	
Kaijutitan maui Filippi et al., 2019	Valid	Filippi, Salgado, and Garrido	Aug 2019			Argentina	
Fushanosaurus qitaiensis Wang et al., 2019	Valid	Wang, Wu, Li, Ji, Li, and Guo	Sep 2019			China	
Itapeuasaurus cajapioensis Lindoso et al., 2019	Valid	Lindoso, Medeiros, Carvalho, Pereira, Mendes, Iori, Sousa, Arcanjo, and Silva	Dec 2019			Brazil	
Nullotitan glaciaris Novas et al., 2019	Valid	Novas, Agnolin, Rozadilla, Aranciaga-Rolando, Brisson-Egli, Motta, Cerroni, Ezcurra, Martinelli, D'Angelo, Alvarez-Herrera, Gentil, Bogan, Chimento, García-Marsà, Lo Coco, Miquel, Brito, Vera, Perez Loinaze, Fernández, and Salgado	2019		83.6–66 Ma; Late Cretaceous: late Campanian–early Maastrichtian	Argentina	
Anhuilong diboensis Ren et al., 2020	Valid	Ren, Huang, and You	2020		174.7–161.5 Ma; Middle Jurassic	China	
Yamanasaurus lojaensis Apesteguía et al., 2020	Valid	Apesteguía, Soto Luzuriaga, Gallina, Tamay Granda, and Guamán Jaramillo	2020		66.9 Ma; Late Cretaceous: late Maastrichtian	Ecuador	
Abdarainurus barsboldi Averianov & Lopatin, 2020	Valid	Averianov and Lopatin	2020		100.5–66 Ma; Late Cretaceous	Mongolia	
Omeisaurus puxiani Tan et al., 2020	Valid	Tan, Xiao, Dai, Hu, Li, Ma, Wei, Yu, Xiong, Peng, Jiang, Ren, and You	2020		174.7–161.5 Ma; Middle Jurassic	China	
Analong chuanjieensis Ren et al., 2020	Valid	Ren, Sekiya, Wang, Yang, and You	2020	Mamenchisauridae	170.9–168.2 Ma; Middle Jurassic: Bajocian	China	
Narindasaurus thevenini Royo-Torres et al., 2020	Valid	Royo-Torres, Cobos, Mocho, and Alcalá	Sep 3, 2020		168.2–165.3 Ma; Middle Jurassic: Bathonian	Madagascar	
Bravasaurus arrierosorum Hechenleitner et al., 2020	Valid	Hechenleitner, Leuzinger, Martinelli, Rocher, Fiorelli, Taborda, and Salgado	2020		83.6–66 Ma; Late Cretaceous: Campanian–Maastrichtian	Argentina	
Punatitan coughlini Hechenleitner et al., 2020	Valid	Hechenleitner, Leuzinger, Martinelli, Rocher, Fiorelli, Taborda, and Salgado	2020	Aeolosaurini	83.6–66 Ma; Late Cretaceous: Campanian–Maastrichtian	Argentina	
Bagualia alba Pol et al., 2020	Valid	Pol, Ramezani, Gomez, Carballido, Paulina Carabajal, Rauhut, Escapa, and Cúneo	Nov 25, 2020	Eusauropoda	179.17±0.12 Ma; Early Jurassic: Toarcian	Argentina	
Garrigatitan meridionalis Díez Díaz et al., 2021	Valid	Díez Díaz, Garcia, Pereda Suberbiola, Jentgen-Ceschino, Stein, Godefroit, and Valentin	2021		72.2–66 Ma; Late Cretaceous: early Maastrichtian	France	
Dzharatitanis kingi Averianov & Sues, 2021	Valid	Averianov and Sues	Feb 24, 2021		93.9–89.8 Ma; Late Cretaceous: Turonian	Uzbekistan	
Ninjatitan zapatai Gallina et al., 2021	Valid	Gallina, Canale, and Carballido	Feb 28, 2021	Titanosauria	143.1–132.6 Ma; Early Cretaceous: late Berriasian–Valanginian	Argentina	
Arackar licanantay Rubilar-Rogers et al., 2021	Valid	Rubilar-Rogers, Vargas, González Riga, Soto-Acuña, Alarcón-Muñoz, Iriarte-Díaz, Arévalo, and Gutstein	Aug 2021	Lithostrotia	83.6–66 Ma; Late Cretaceous: Campanian–Maastrichtian	Chile	
Australotitan cooperensis Hocknull et al., 2021	Nomen dubium, possible synonym of Diamantinasaurus matildae	Hocknull, Wilkinson, Lawrence, Konstantinov, Mackenzie, and Mackenzie	Jun 7, 2021	Titanosauria	96–89.8 Ma; Late Cretaceous: Cenomanian–Turonian	Australia	
Silutitan sinensis Wang et al., 2021	Valid	Wang, Bandeira, Qiu, Jiang, Cheng, Ma, and Kellner	2021	Euhelopodidae	143.1–100.5 Ma; Early Cretaceous	China	
Hamititan xinjiangensis Wang et al., 2021	Valid	Wang, Bandeira, Qiu, Jiang, Cheng, Ma, and Kellner	2021	Titanosauria	143.1–100.5 Ma; Early Cretaceous	China	
Menucocelsior arriagadai Rolando et al., 2022	Valid	Rolando, Marsà, Agnolín, Motta, Rozadilla, and Novas	2022	Eutitanosauria	72.2–66 Ma; Late Cretaceous: Maastrichtian	Argentina	
Rhomaleopakhus turpanensis Upchurch et al., 2021	Valid	Upchurch, Mannion, Xu, and Barrett	Dec 13, 2021	Mamenchisauridae	154.8–143.1 Ma; Late Jurassic: Kimmeridgian–Tithonian	China	
Abditosaurus kuehnei Vila et al., 2022	Valid	Vila, Sellés, Moreno-Azanza, Razzolini, Gil-Delgado, Canudo, and Galobart	Feb 7, 2022	Saltasaurinae	70.5 Ma; Late Cretaceous: early Maastrichtian	Spain	
Perijasaurus lapaz Rincón et al., 2022	Valid	Rincón, Raad Pájaro, Jiménez Velandia, Ezcurra, and Wilson Mantilla	Aug 10, 2022	Eusauropoda	174.7 Ma; Jurassic: latest Toarcian–earliest Aalenian	Colombia	
Ibirania parva Navarro et al., 2022	Valid	Navarro, Ghilardi, Aureliano, Díez Díaz, Bandeira, Cataruzzi, Iori, Martine, Carvalho, Anelli, Fernandes, and Zaher	Sep 15, 2022	Saltasaurinae	85.7–72.2 Ma; Late Cretaceous: late Santonian–early Campanian	Brazil	
Yuzhoulong qurenensis Dai et al., 2022	Valid	Dai, Tan, Xiong, Ma, Li, Yu, Wei, Wang, Yi, Wei, You, and Ren	Oct 2, 2022	Macronaria	168.2–165.3 Ma; Middle Jurassic: Bathonian	China	
Caieiria allocaudata Silva Junior et al., 2022	Valid	Silva Junior, Martinelli, Marinho, da Silva, and Langer	Nov 15, 2022	Titanosauria	72.2–66 Ma; Late Cretaceous: Maastrichtian	Brazil	
Ruixinia zhangi Mo et al., 2022	Valid	Mo, Ma, Yu, and Xu	Dec 9, 2022	Somphospondyli	~125 Ma; Early Cretaceous: Barremian	China	
Chucarosaurus diripienda Agnolin et al., 2023	Valid	Agnolin, Gonzalez Riga, Aranciaga Rolando, Rozadilla, Motta, Chimento, and Novas	Feb 2, 2023	Colossosauria	100.5–89.8 Ma; Late Cretaceous: middle Cenomanian–early Turonian	Argentina	
Igai semkhu Gorscak et al., 2023	Valid	Gorscak, Lamanna, Schwarz, Díez Díaz, Salem, Sallam, and Wiechmann	Jul 20, 2023	Lithostrotia	83.6–72.2 Ma; Late Cretaceous: Campanian	Egypt	
Tharosaurus indicus Bajpai et al., 2023	Valid	Bajpai, Datta, Pandey, Ghosh, Kumar, and Bhattacharya	Aug 4, 2023	Dicraeosauridae	168.2–165.3 Ma; Middle Jurassic: Bathonian	India	
Jiangxititan ganzhouensis Mo et al., 2023	Valid	Mo, Fu, Yu, and Xu	Sep 21, 2023	Lognkosauria	72.2–66 Ma; Late Cretaceous: Maastrichtian	China	
Garumbatitan morellensis Mocho et al., 2023	Valid	Mocho, Escaso, Gasulla, Galobart, Poza, Santos-Cubedo, Sanz, and Ortega	Sep 28, 2023	Somphospondyli	125.77–121.4 Ma; Early Cretaceous: late Barremian	Spain	
Inawentu oslatus Filippi et al., 2023	Valid	Filippi, Juárez Valieri, Gallina, Méndez, Gianechini, and Garrido	Oct 30, 2023	Eutitanosauria	85.7–83.6 Ma; Late Cretaceous: Santonian	Argentina	
Bustingorrytitan shiva Simón & Salgado, 2023	Valid	Simón and Salgado	Dec 18, 2023	Lithostrotia	100.5–93.9 Ma; Late Cretaceous: upper Cenomanian	Argentina	
Sidersaura marae Lerzo et al., 2024	Valid	Lerzo, Gallina, Canale, Otero, Carballido, Apesteguía, and Makovicky	Jan 3, 2024	Rebbachisauridae	100.5–89.8 Ma; Late Cretaceous: upper Cenomanian–Turonian	Argentina	
Gandititan cavocaudatus Han et al., 2024	Valid	Han, Yang, Lou, Sullivan, Xu, Qiu, Liu, Yu, Wu, Ke, Xu, Hu, and Lu	Jan 17, 2024	Titanosauria	100.5–89.8 Ma; Late Cretaceous: upper Cenomanian–Turonian	China	
Jingiella dongxingensis (Ren et al., 2024)	Valid	Ren, Wang, Ji, Guo, and Ji	Feb 22, 2024	Mamenchisauridae	154.8–149.2 Ma; Late Jurassic: Kimmeridgian?	China	The generic name Jingia was originally proposed but it was already in use for a genus of moth. The replacement name, Jingiella, was published in April later that year.
Udelartitan celeste Soto et al., 2024	Valid	Soto, Carballido, Langer, Silva Junior, Montenegro, and Perea	Mar 26, 2024	Saltasauroidea		Uruguay	
Titanomachya gimenezi Pérez-Moreno et al., 2024	Valid	Pérez-Moreno, Salgado, Carballido, Otero, and Pol	Apr 10, 2024	Saltasauroidea	72.2–66 Ma; Late Cretaceous: Maastrichtian	Argentina	
Tiamat valdecii Pereira et al., 2024	Valid	Pereira, Bandeira, Vidal, Ribeiro, Candeiro, and Bergqvist	May 13, 2024	Titanosauria	113.2–93.9 Ma; Cretaceous: Albian–Cenomanian	Brazil	
Campananeyen fragilissimus Lerzo et al., 2024	Valid	Lerzo, Torcida Fernández-Baldor, Canale, Whitlock, Otero, and Gallina	Aug 13, 2024	Rebbachisauridae	100.5–93.9 Ma; Late Cretaceous: Early Cenomanian	Argentina	
Qunkasaura pintiquiniestra Mocho et al., 2024	Valid	Mocho, Escaso, Marcos-Fernández, Páramo, Sanz, Vidal, and Ortega	Sep 4, 2024	Saltasauridae	83.6–66 Ma; Late Cretaceous: late Campanian–early Maastrichtian	Spain	
Ardetosaurus viator van der Linden et al., 2024	Valid	van der Linden, Tschopp, Sookias, Wallaard, Holwerda, and Schulp	Oct 8, 2024	Diplodocinae		United States	
Uriash kadici Díez Díaz et al., 2025	Valid	Díez Díaz, Mannion, Csiki-Sava, and Upchurch	Feb 20, 2025	Titanosauria		Romania	
Chadititan calvoi Agnolín et al., 2025	Valid	Agnolín, Motta, Marsà, Aranciaga-Rolando, Álvarez-Herrera, Chimento, Rozadilla, Brissón-Egli, Cerroni, Panzeri, Bogan, Casadio, Sterli, Miquel, Martínez, Pérez, Pol, and Novas	2025	Titanosauria		Argentina	
Cienciargentina sanchezi Simón and Salgado, 2025	Valid	Simón and Salgado	April 9, 2025	Rebbachisauridae		Argentina	
Jinchuanloong niedu Li et al., 2025	Valid	Li, Zhang, Ren, Li, and You	May 23, 2025	Eusauropoda		China	
Astigmasaura genuflexa Bellardini et al., 2025	Valid	Bellardini, Filippi, Carballido, Garrido, and Baiano	June 13, 2025	Rebbachisauridae		Argentina	

== Sauropodomorphs of uncertain affinity ==
This section of the list contains sauropodomorphs that are more closely related to eusauropods than Melanorosaurus but not as closely as Vulcanodon, thus lying between the two proposed boundaries of Sauropoda, as well as sauropodomorphs of unspecified phylogenetic position whose status as sauropods is disputed.

Ambiguous and borderline sauropods
Scientific name	Taxonomic status	Authors	Date named	Age	Countries	Phylogenetic position	Notes	Skeletal diagram
Amygdalodon patagonicus Cabrera, 1947	Valid	Cabrera	Feb 13, 1947		Argentina	Interpreted as a eusauropod by Rauhut. Recovered basal to Vulcanodon by phylogenetic analysis.		
Volkheimeria chubutensis Bonaparte, 1979	Valid	Bonaparte	Sep 28, 1979		Argentina	Recovered basal to Vulcanodon by phylogenetic analysis		
Camelotia borealis Galton, 1985		Galton	1985		United Kingdom	Originally described as a melanorosaurid, but has been recovered within Sauropoda sensu lato by some studies		
Blikanasaurus cromptoni Galton & Van Heerden, 1985	Valid	Galton and Van Heerden	1985		South Africa	Originally described as a prosauropod, but has been recovered as a member of Sauropoda sensu lato by some studies.		
Chinshakiangosaurus chunghoensis Dong, 1992	Valid	Dong	1992		China			
Kunmingosaurus wudingensis Dong, 1992	Nomen dubium	Dong	1992		China	Sauropod status regarded as tentative		
Gongxianosaurus shibeiensis He et al., 1998	Valid	He, Wang, Liu, Zhou, Liu, Cai, and Dai	1998		China			
Lessemsaurus sauropoides Bonaparte, 1999	Valid	Bonaparte	1999		Argentina			
Isanosaurus attavipachi Buffetaut et al., 2000	Valid	Buffetaut, Suteethorn, Cuny, Tong, Le Loeuff, Khansubha, and Jongautchariyakul	Sep 7, 2000		Thailand	Recovered basal to Vulcanodon in some studies, but more derived than Vulcanodon in others		
Antetonitrus ingenipes Yates & Kitching, 2003	Valid	Yates and Kitching	Aug 22, 2003		South Africa			
Lamplughsaura dharmaramensis Kutty et al., 2007	Valid	Kutty, Chatterjee, Galton, and Upchurch	2007		India	Kutty et al. conducted two phylogenetic analyses, one of which recovered Lamplughsaura as a sauropod and the other of which did not.		
Leonerasaurus taquetrensis Pol et al., 2011	Valid	Pol, Garrido, and Cerda	Jan 26, 2011		Argentina			
Pulanesaura eocollum McPhee et al., 2015	Valid	McPhee, Bonnan, Yates, Neveling, and Choiniere	2015		South Africa			
Ingentia prima Apaldetti et al., 2018	Valid	Apaldetti, Martínez, Cerda, Pol, and Alcober	2018		Argentina			
Ledumahadi mafube McPhee et al., 2018	Valid	McPhee, Benson, Botha-Brink, Bordy, and Choiniere	2018		South Africa			
Schleitheimia schutzi Rauhut et al., 2020	Valid	Rauhut, Holwerda, and Furrer	2020	Late Triassic (Norian)	Switzerland			

== Non-sauropodomorphs misidentified as sauropods ==
This section of the list covers taxa that were at one point referred to Sauropoda, its historical synonyms Cetiosauria or Opisthocoelia, or referred to a taxon that is now regarded as a sauropod, such as the genus Cetiosaurus. However, it excludes sauropodomorphs that were referred to Sauropoda as a result of debate over where the boundary between sauropods and non-sauropod sauropodomorphs lie.

Species misidentified as sauropods
Scientific name	Taxonomic status	Current classification	Notes
Cetiosaurus brachyurus Owen, 1842	Nomen dubium	Iguanodon	One of the four original species of Cetiosaurus. Referred to Iguanodon in 1849 by Melville, a referral that was still upheld as of 2003.
Hypsibema crassicauda Cope, 1869			Regarded as a sauropod by Baird and Horner in 1979.
Cetiosaurus rigauxi Sauvage, 1874		Pliosaurus	Sauvage initially interpreted this species, based on a single vertebra, as belonging to Cetiosaurus. In 1895, he reinterpreted it as belonging to the marine reptile Pliosaurus.
Apatodon mirus Marsh, 1877			Listed as a sauropod by Kuhn in 1937
Tichosteus lucasanus Cope, 1877			Listed as a member of Cetiosauria by Osborn in 1898
Epanterias amplexus Cope, 1878		Theropoda	Regarded as a sauropod by Cope; still listed as a sauropod by Romer in 1956.
Brachyrophus altarkansanus Cope, 1878		Ornithopoda	Listed as a sauropod by Kuhn in 1937
Symphyrophus musculosus Cope, 1878	Subjective junior synonym of Camptosaurus dispar	Ornithopoda	Listed as a member of Cetiosauria by Osborn in 1898. Has been synonymized with Camptosaurus dispar, but may be a chimera that includes crocodylian material.
Morosaurus marchei Sauvage, 1898	Nomen dubium	Theropoda	A tooth formerly referred to this taxon, MG 8779, does come from a sauropod
Succinodon putzeri Huene, 1941		Teredinidae	Described by Huene as the jaw of a sauropod, but later discovered to be the borings of shipworms.
Hypsibema missouriensis (Gilmore & Stewart, 1945)	Valid	Ornithopoda	Originally described as a sauropod under the name Neosaurus missouriensis, but the name Neosaurus was preoccupied so it was renamed Parrosaurus missouriensis. Reclassified as a species of Hypsibema in 1979 by Baird and Horner, who regarded the genus as belonging to Sauropoda.
Astrodon pusillus Lapparent & Zbyszewski, 1957	Nomen dubium	Dinosauria	Originally described as a species of the sauropod Astrodon. In 1981, Galton reidentified it as belonging to the stegosaurid Dacentrurus. In 2008, Maidment et al. concluded it lacked evidence of stegosaur affinities and should be regarded as an indeterminate dinosaur.

== Informally named sauropods ==
This section of the list contains sauropods that have never been formally scientifically named, but have been referred to with an informal binomial name.

Name	Author	Date	Notes
"Amphicoelias brontodiplodocus"			
"Nurosaurus qaganensis"			
"Mamenchisaurus guangyuanensis"	Zhang	1981	Described by Zhang Suoping in her 1981 master's thesis as "Omeisaurus guangyuanensis". Referred to Mamenchisaurus by Li and Cai in 1997. Ouyang and Ye tentatively agreed with Li and Cai's assessment in 2002, but were unsure whether it represented a distinct species. Based on fossils from the Upper Shaximiao Formation, including several juvenile specimens.
"Dachongosaurus yunnanensis"			
"Lancanjiangosaurus cachuensis"			
"Megacervixosaurus tibetensis"			
"Microdontosaurus dayensis"			
"Oshanosaurus youngi"			
"Rutellum implicatum"			
"Yunxianosaurus hubeinensis"			
