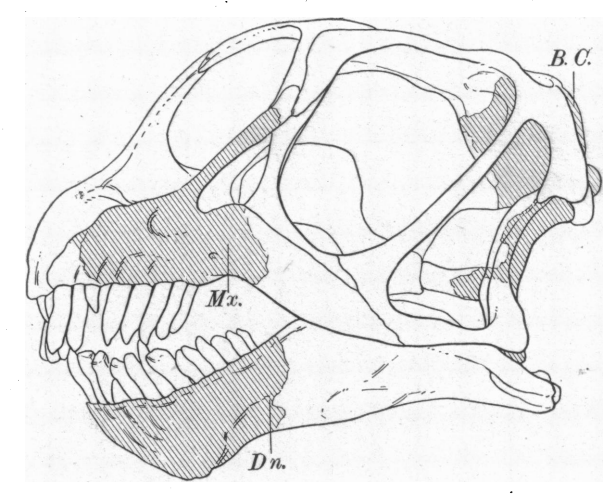
- Composite skull reconstruction of C. supremus from Osborn and Mook (1921)

Scientific classification
- Kingdom: Animalia
- Phylum: Chordata
- Class: Reptilia
- Clade: Dinosauria
- Clade: Saurischia
- Clade: †Sauropodomorpha
- Clade: †Sauropoda
- Clade: †Macronaria
- Family: †Camarasauridae
- Genus: †Camarasaurus
- Species: †C. supremus

Binomial name
- †Camarasaurus supremus Cope, 1877

Synonyms
- Amphicoelias latus Cope, 1877; Caulodon diversidens Cope, 1877; Caulodon leptoganus Cope, 1878; Camarasaurus leptodirus Cope, 1879

= Camarasaurus supremus =

Camarasaurus supremus Temporal range: Late Jurassic, 145 Ma

Species of sauropod dinosaur

Camarasaurus supremus is a species of sauropod dinosaur that lived during the Jurassic period in what is now the western United States. It is the type species of Camarasaurus, which also includes the species Camarasaurus grandis, Camarasaurus lentus, and Camarasaurus lewisi. C. supremus was discovered by the paleontologist Edward Drinker Cope in 1877, at the outset of the Bone Wars, a period of scientific competition between Cope and his rival Othniel Marsh. C. supremus is the largest and geologically youngest species in its genus, and was contemporary with several other exceptionally large dinosaurs, such as Saurophaganax and Maraapunisaurus. Despite being the first discovered species of Camarasaurus, C. supremus is relatively rare and poorly known.

== Taxonomy ==
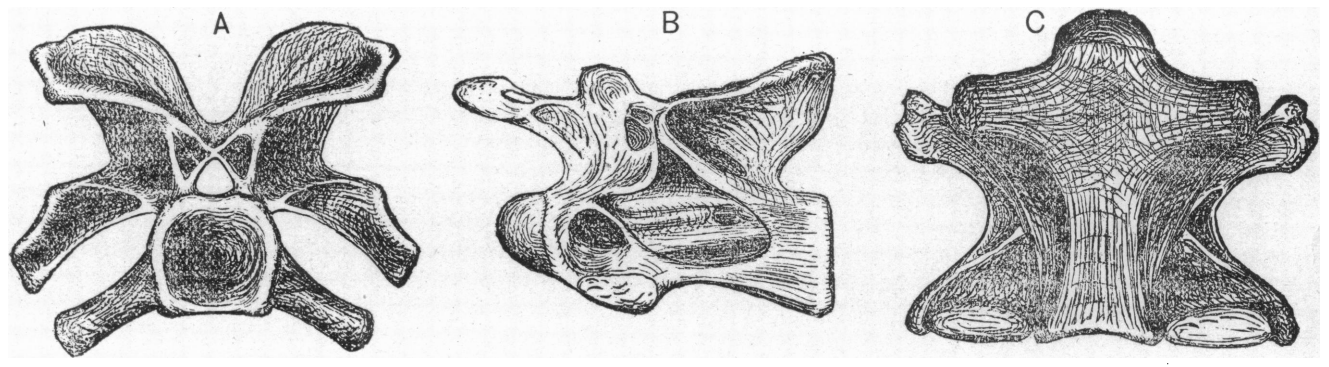
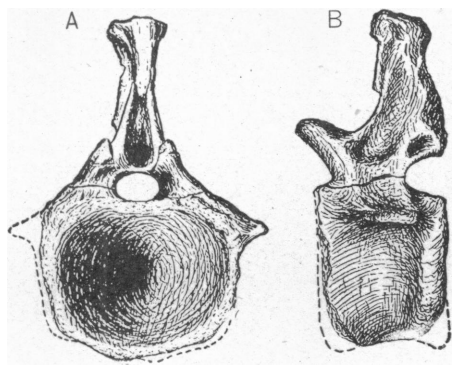
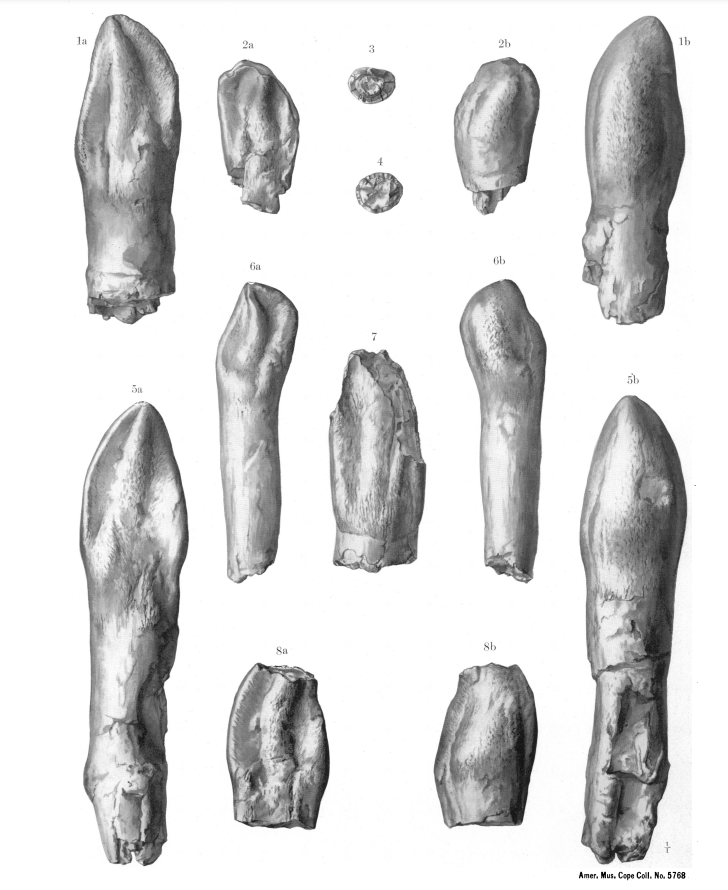
Fossils of Camarasaurus leptodirus, Amphicoelias latus, and Caulodon diversidens; synonyms of C. supremus

Camarasaurus supremus was named by Edward Drinker Cope in 1877. It is the type species of Camarasaurus, and is one of four valid species of the genus, alongside Camarasaurus grandis, Camarasaurus lentus, and Camarasaurus lewisi. The type specimens of C. supremus are a cervical vertebra, three dorsal vertebrae, and four caudal vertebrae, which probably come from more than one individual. These fossils are among the specimens catalogued as AMNH 5760. Due to their close anatomical similarity, there is some uncertainty regarding whether C. lentus and C. supremus are distinct species, but most researchers regard both species as valid.

Specimens of Camarasaurus supremus have been found in the Morrison Formation. It is primarily known from several disarticulated skeletons from Colorado collectively catalogued as AMNH 5760 and AMNH 5761, which consist of skull fragments, dozens of vertebrae, several bones of the pectoral girdle and pelvis, and a few limb bones. One or two other fragmentary specimens have also been reported from Colorado. Probable C. supremus specimens including both juveniles and adults are known from Oklahoma.

There are four recognized junior subjective synonyms of Camarasaurus supremus, all of which were named by Cope soon after his discovery of C. supremus: Amphicoelias latus, Caulodon diversidens, Caulodon leptoganus, and Camarasaurus leptodirus.

- Amphicoelias latus was named by Cope in 1877 on the basis of a right femur and four caudal vertebrae that were found in layers of the Morrison Formation at Garden Park alongside fossils of C. supremus. As of 2021, it is generally considered a synonym of C. supremus, also Kenneth Carpenter has argued in 1998 that its stratigraphic position may make it more likely to be synonymous with C. grandis.
- Caulodon diversidens was named by Cope in 1877 as a new genus and species on the basis of ten teeth from Garden Park that were found together but without other bones of the skull. This species has been considered a nomen dubium assignable to Camarasaurus or a synonym of C. supremus.
- Caulodon leptoganus was named by Cope in 1878 on the basis of one tooth, also from Garden Park. Cope noted that a second, more incomplete tooth may also belong to the species. This species has been considered a synonym of C. supremus.
- Camarasaurus leptodirus was named by Cope in 1879 on the basis of three partial cervical vertebrae that were found in the Morrison Formation at Garden Park. Cope thought that these vertebrae were much more slender than those of his C. supremus. It is now thought to be a synonym of C. supremus.

== Description ==
Camarasaurus supremus was the largest species of Camarasaurus, 20% to 50% larger than the other species in linear dimensions. Gregory S. Paul estimated its length as 18 metres (59 ft) and 23-24 tonnes, whereas John Foster estimated its length as 23 metres (75 ft) and 42.3 tonnes. The femur of C. supremus could reach a length of 1.8 metres (5.9 ft), whereas the maximum size in other species of Camarasaurus was 1.5 metres (4.9 ft).

Apart from its size, C. supremus was generally similar to other species of Camarasaurus in anatomy. It differed from C. lentus in the shape of its anterior caudal neural spines, which have an abrupt T-shaped expansion in C. supremus and expanded more gently in C. lentus. It differed from C. grandis in the shape of its anterior dorsal vertebrae, which were taller and narrower in C. grandis and shorter and wider in C. supremus. The pelvis of C. supremus is not rotated forward relative to the sacrum, unlike some other species of Camarasaurus.

== History of study ==
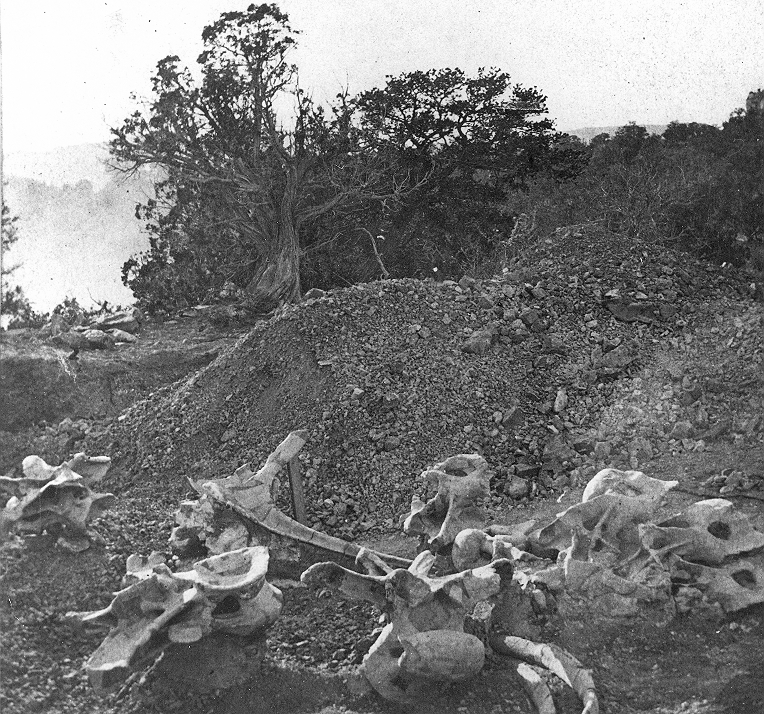
Camarasaurus supremus bones still in the quarry

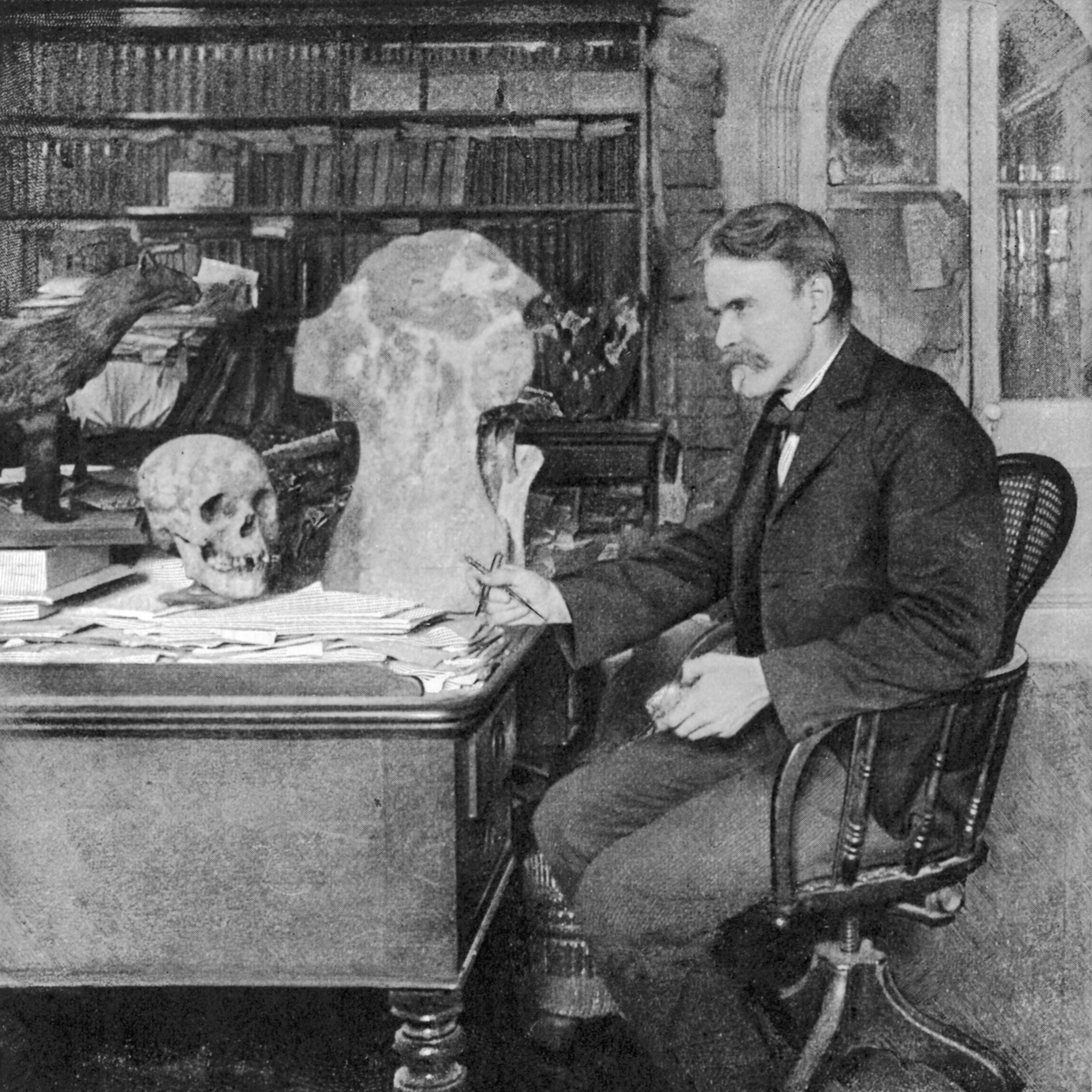
Photo of Edward Drinker Cope next to a cervical vertebra of Camarasaurus supremus

The first specimens of Camarasaurus supremus known to science were found in the spring of 1877 by Oramel William Lucas, a schoolteacher in Cañon City. Lucas collected several large vertebrae at Garden Park in Colorado. Lucas sent the fossils to Edward Drinker Cope in Philadelphia. Cope identified them as belonging to a new species, which he named Camarasaurus supremus in a paper published on August 23, 1877 and the fossils were deposited in Cope's private collection. Cope believed it to be the largest terrestrial animal yet known and a relative of large dinosaurs from Europe and the eastern United States, like Cetiosaurus and Anchisaurus. After receiving the original bones, Cope employed collectors who gathered more of the material which was described in detail in 1921 by Henry Osborn and Charles Mook. Over the next two years, Cope named a series of species based on material that would later be referred to Camarasaurus supremus: Amphicoelias latus, Caulodon diversidens, Caulodon leptoganus, and Camarasaurus leptodirus.

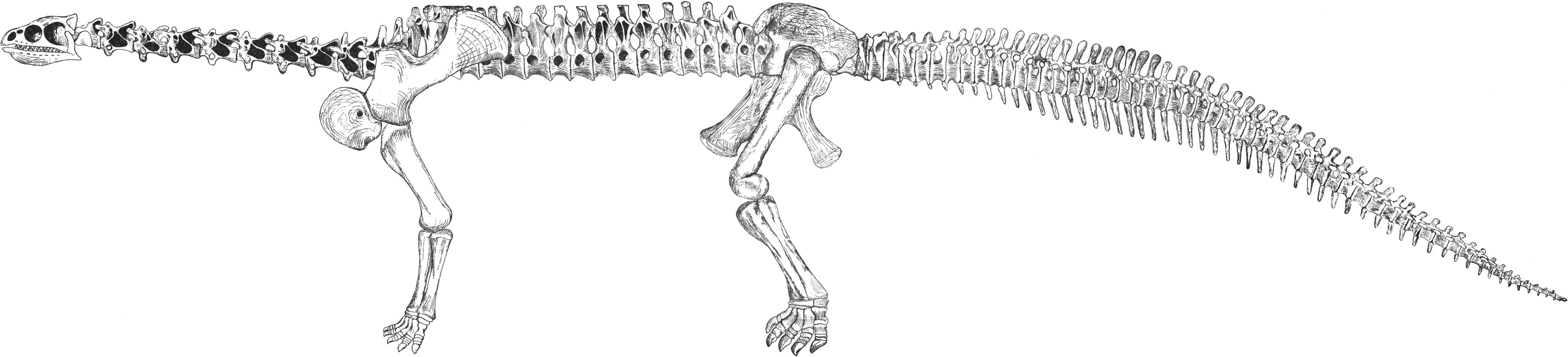
John A. Ryder's skeletal reconstruction of C. supremus, the earliest skeletal reconstruction of a sauropod

In 1877, John A. Ryder created a life-sized illustration of the skeleton of Camarasaurus supremus with guidance from Cope that was fifty feet long. It was the first reconstruction of the skeleton of a sauropod ever made. It was exhibited to the American Philosophical Society on December 21 of that year. Cope regarded Camarasaurus as a terrestrial, herbivorous reptile that he compared to the giraffe due to the length of its neck.

The total amount of material collected at Garden Park was great, it composed of several jumbled partial skeletons collected from 1877 to 1879. It was not all prepared at once, but a considerable amount of it was cleaned up by Jacob Geismar under Cope's direction throughout the 1870s to 1890s. By the end of collecting in Garden Park, at least four individuals and several hundred bones had been found from nearly every part of the skeleton. For decades after its discovery, Camarasaurus supremus would remain a relatively obscure taxon compared to the more complete and more extensively figured sauropods discovered by Cope's opponent Othniel Marsh.

In 1902, the American Museum of Natural History acquired Cope's fossil collection. The specimens originally collected by Oramel Lucas in 1877 were catalogued as AMNH 5760, and the specimens collected by Ira Lucas in 1880 were catalogued as AMNH 5761. The material consisted of several individuals, with few records on where each bone was found and how they were associated, so the museum's paleontologists William Diller Matthew, William King Gregory, and Henry Fairfield Osborn attempted to sort the bones into individual series. Cope's specimens of Camarasaurus supremus were finally fully described in a detailed monograph by Henry Fairfield Osborn and Charles Craig Mook in 1921, and the various other species Cope had established based on probable C. supremus specimens were synonymized with it.

In 1925, Charles W. Gilmore suggested that Camarasaurus (formerly Morosaurus) robustus was synonymous with C. supremus, as did Theodore E. White in 1958. Subsequent reviews have considered C. robustus to be synonymous with C. grandis instead. White also regarded C. grandis as a synonym of C. supremus. Camarasaurus cf. supremus fossils were reported from New Mexico in 1982, but later reinterpreted as C. grandis. Possible additional Camarasaurus supremus material was found near Black Mesa in western Oklahoma during the 1940s, the material consists of many large vertebrae and some skull elements. South of Garden Park, several potential C. supremus remains were found by the Denver Museum of Natural History in Tithonian strata. The remains consisted of a pubis and several vertebrae, and were referred to C. supremus in 2005.

== Paleobiology ==
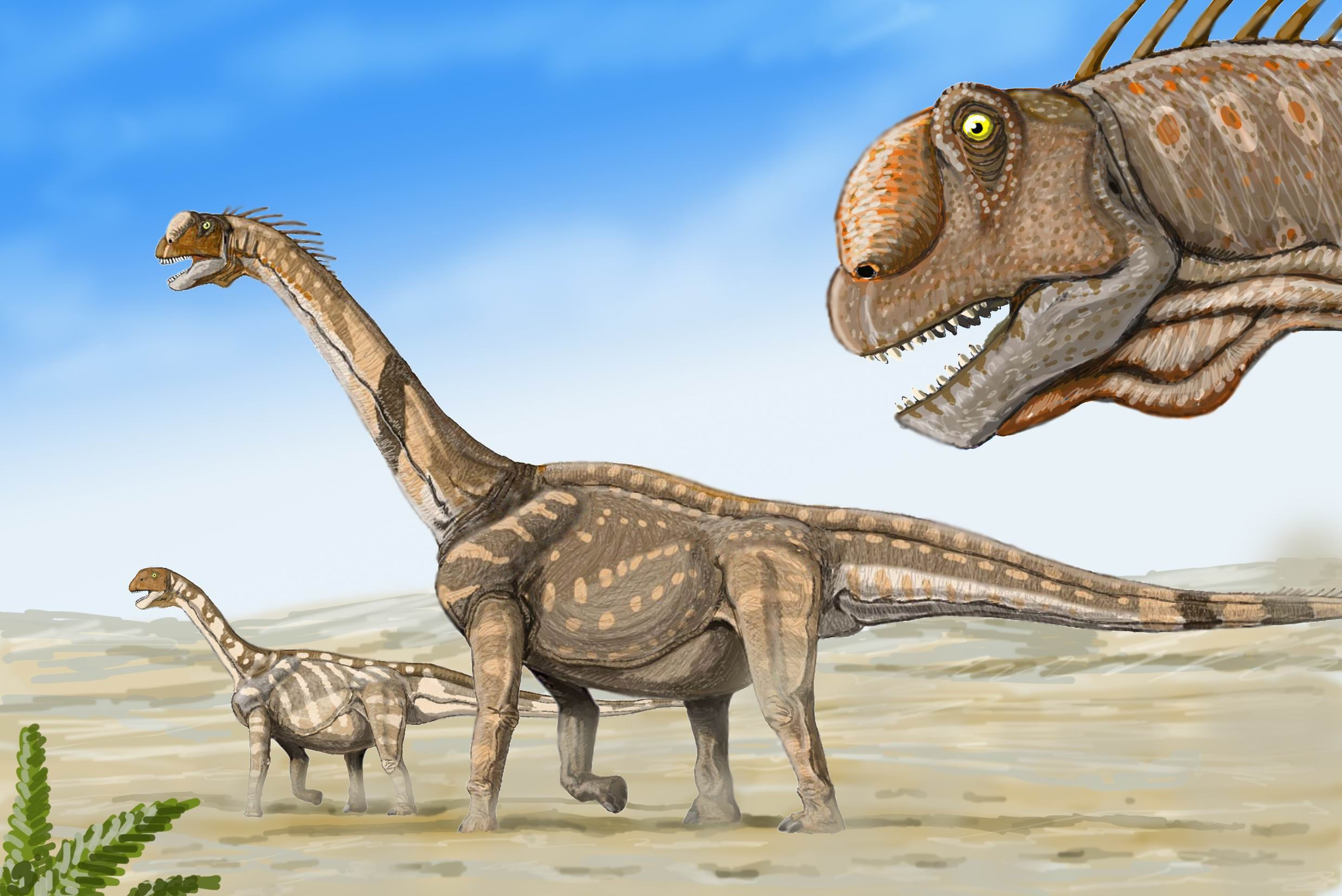
Restoration of a C. supremus herd

C. supremus lived during the Tithonian age of the Jurassic in what is now Colorado and possibly Oklahoma. Its fossils are only known from the uppermost layers of the Morrison Formation, and it is rare, with only 4.5% of Camarasaurus specimens identified as belonging to the species.

C. supremus was among the largest sauropods known from the Morrison Formation, and may have weighed more than Brachiosaurus, which is found in older parts of the Morrison Formation than C. supremus. Based on fossils from Garden Park, C. supremus coexisted with the large, enigmatic diplodocoids Amphicoelias altus and Maraapunisaurus fragillimus, the latter of which may have been one of the largest dinosaurs ever to exist. An indeterminate apatosaurine was also contemporary with C. supremus at Garden Park, but was no larger than earlier apatosaurines. The dubious allosaurid Epanterias amplexus shows that C. supremus coexisted with exceptionally large predators as well. In 1990, Robert T. Bakker called this upper portion of the Morrison Formation the "giant camarasaur-allosaur zone". It is uncertain whether the large size of C. supremus and some of its contemporaries is evidence of a genuine ecological trend towards larger size or not. A changing climate may have facilitated the evolution of larger species towards the end of the depositional period of the Morrison Formation. Camarasaurus specimens found at the Stovall quarries near Kenton, Oklahoma probably belong to C. supremus. These quarries have also produced specimens of another gigantic allosaurid, Saurophaganax maximus.

Camarasaurus supremus may be a descendant of the earlier species C. lentus, though there may be some overlap in their chronostratigraphic ranges.
