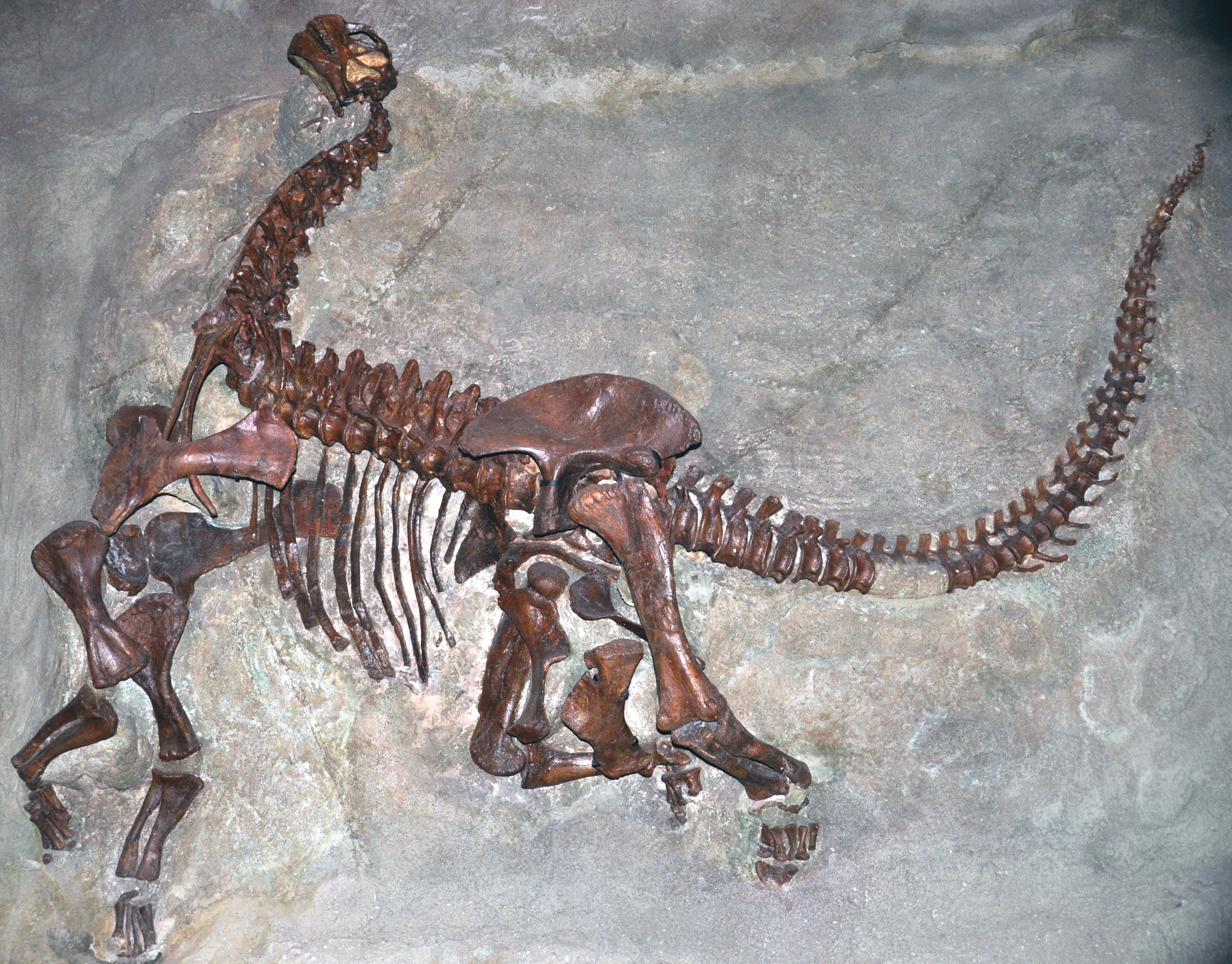
- CM 11338, a juvenile Camarasaurus lentus, on display at the Carnegie Museum

Scientific classification
- Kingdom: Animalia
- Phylum: Chordata
- Class: Reptilia
- Clade: Dinosauria
- Clade: Saurischia
- Clade: †Sauropodomorpha
- Clade: †Sauropoda
- Clade: †Macronaria
- Family: †Camarasauridae
- Genus: †Camarasaurus
- Species: †C. lentus

Binomial name
- †Camarasaurus lentus (Marsh, 1889)

Synonyms
- Morosaurus lentus Marsh, 1889; Uintasaurus douglassi Holland, 1919; Camarasaurus douglassi (Holland, 1919) Olshevsky, 1978; Camarasaurus annae Ellinger, 1950

= Camarasaurus lentus =

Species of sauropod

Camarasaurus lentus is an extinct species of sauropod dinosaur that lived during the Jurassic period in what is now the western United States. It is one of the four valid species of the well-known genus Camarasaurus. C. lentus fossils have been found in Wyoming, Colorado, and Utah. It is the species of Camarasaurus found in Dinosaur National Monument and the middle layers of the Morrison Formation. Camarasaurus lentus is among the best-known sauropod species, with many specimens known. A juvenile specimen of C. lentus, CM 11338, is the most complete sauropod fossil ever discovered.

== Description ==
Like other sauropods, Camarasaurus lentus was a large, long-necked quadruped. It closely resembled other species of Camarasaurus in its anatomy, and in particular was very similar to C. supremus. It was of moderate size for the genus, being similar in size to C. grandis, 20% smaller than C. supremus, and slightly larger than C. lewisi. Gregory S. Paul estimated its length as 15 metres (49 ft) and mass as 15 tonnes.

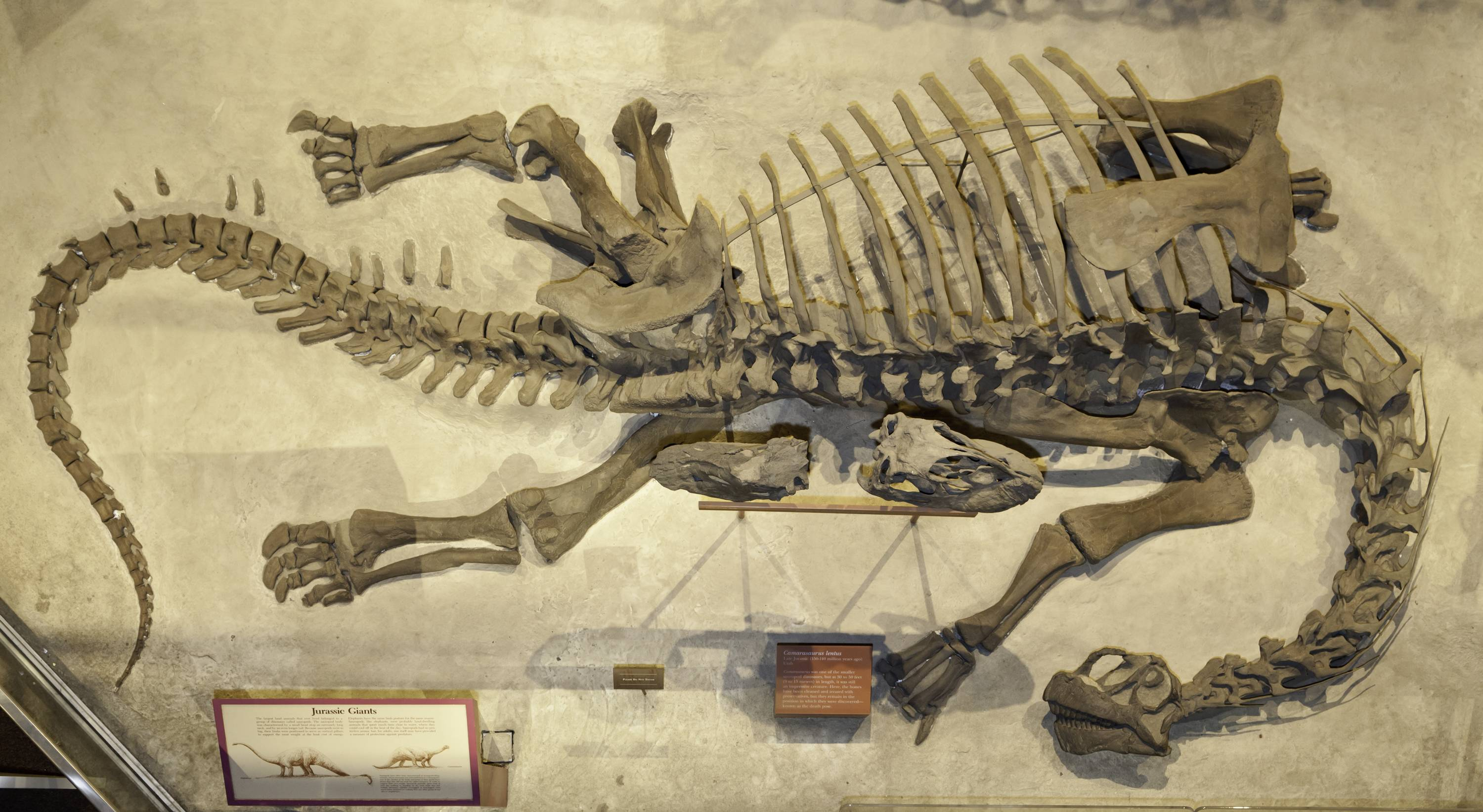
Camarasaurus lentus USNM V 13786 as mounted in the National Museum of Natural History prior to 2019

The skull of C. lentus was typical for Camarasaurus; distinguishing traits between the skulls of different Camarasaurus species are not known.

The anterior dorsal vertebrae of C. lentus have low, broad neural arches, similar to C. supremus but unlike the taller, narrower anterior dorsal neural arches of C. grandis. The anterior caudal neural spines of C. lentus lack the abrupt, T-shaped expansion found in other species of the genus.

The pelvis of C. lentus is rotated relative to the sacrum so that the preacetabular blade of the ilium points slightly downward, as in C. lewisi, but seemingly unlike C. supremus.

C. lentus may exhibit sexual dimorphism in the structure of its dorsal vertebrae.

== History of study ==
The holotype specimen of Camarasaurus lentus was collected from Quarry 13 at Como Bluff, Wyoming, and stored at the Peabody Museum of Natural History under the catalog number YPM 1910. The specimen consisted of a partial posterior skull, mandibles, and the majority of the postcranial skeleton, the most complete Camarasaurus skeleton found during the Bone Wars. In 1889, Othniel Marsh described it as a new species, which he named Morosaurus lentus. The skeleton was later mounted in the Peabody Museum Hall in the 1930s, and remained mounted until the 2020s. Marsh used the name Morosaurus for many species now assigned to Camarasaurus. Camarasaurus had been named by his rival Edward Drinker Cope, and the two genera were recognized as synonymous in the early 20th century. C. lentus was the third of the four currently recognized valid species of Camarasaurus to be named. The holotype was later mounted for display at the Peabody Museum in 1930.

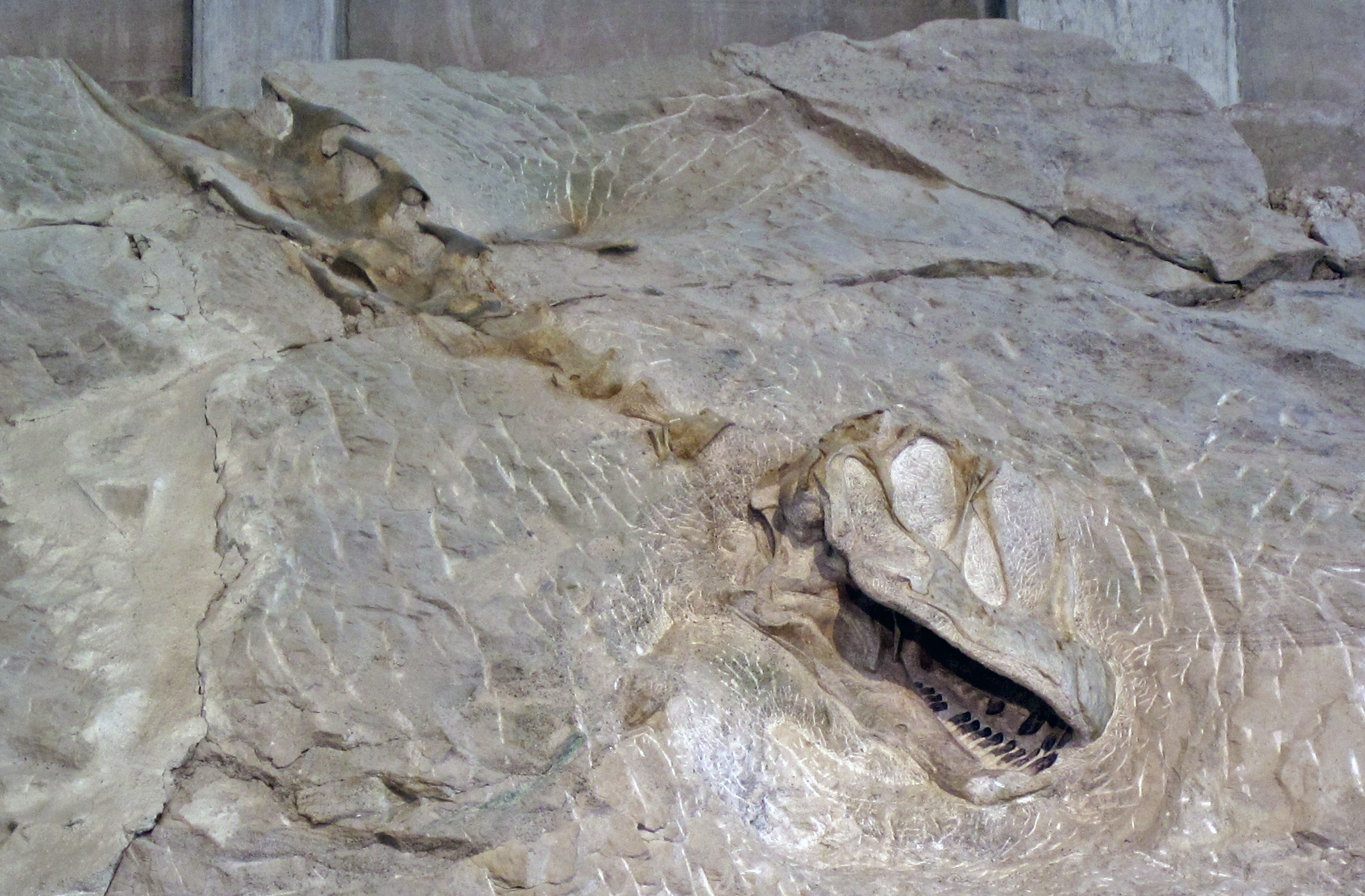
A specimen of C. lentus at Dinosaur National Monument

In 1909, the Carnegie Museum of Natural History paleontologist Earl Douglass discovered a rich fossil site in Utah, Carnegie Quarry, which became protected as part of Dinosaur National Monument in 1915. Excacations at the site lead to the discovery of much additional C. lentus material. A nearly complete specimen of a juvenile C. lentus, CM 11338, was also found at the site by Douglass in 1909, and described by Charles W. Gilmore in 1925. It is the most complete sauropod fossil ever discovered, and nearly every element was in articulation. Later in 1918, the Carnegie Museum collected another complete and articulated skeleton of an adult (USNM V 13786) of C. lentus that was later transferred to the National Museum of Natural History in 1934. The skeleton is now mounted in the NMNH fossil hall. In 1919, the Carnegie Museum's director William Jacob Holland named a new species, Uintasaurus douglassi, on the basis of five cervical vertebrae from the quarry; this species was synonymized with C. lentus in 1958. In 1950, another specimen consisting of an anterior dorsal vertebra from Dinosaur National Monument was named by tage Ellinger as a new species, Camarasaurus annae; this too is now regarded as synonymous with C. lentus.

Additional specimens of C. lentus were discovered by the Wyoming Dinosaur Center in 1992, and are among the most complete adult specimens of the species.

=== Fossils ===
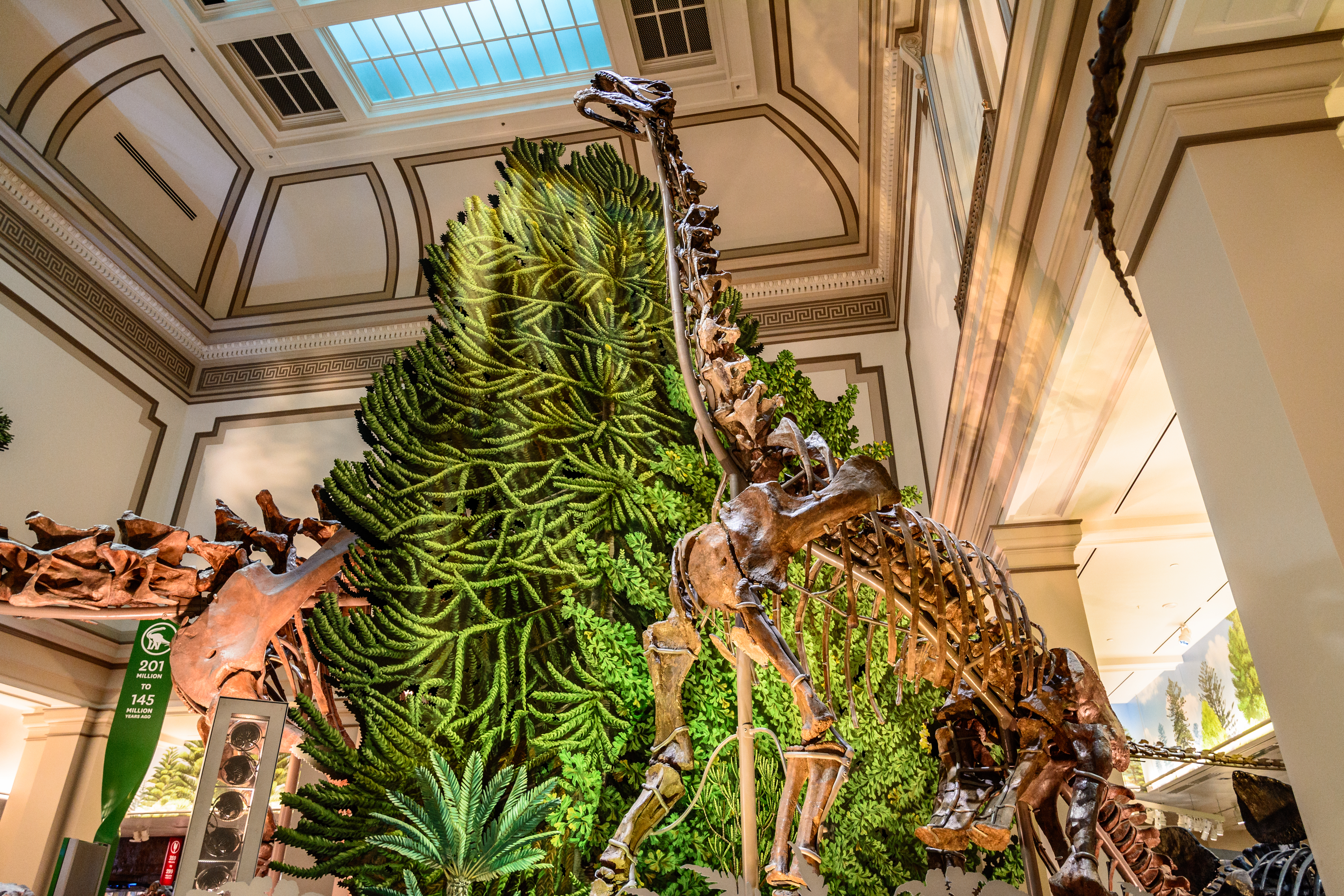
The re-mounted skeleton at the NMNH

Fossils of Camarasaurus lentus are found in the Morrison Formation. Though most specimens of Camarasaurus cannot be identified to species, C. lentus is the most abundant among specimens that can; 11.1% of Camarasaurus specimens have been assigned to C. lentus. It is among the most well-known sauropod species, with exceptionally complete remains, including the aforementioned CM 11338. Two of the fourteen known sauropod specimens to preserve complete necks belong to C. lentus, and the holotype of C. lentus has a nearly complete neck as well.

Most Camarasaurus specimens from Dinosaur National Monument have been referred to C. lentus. The "Wall of Bones" at the Quarry Visitor Center includes specimens of C. lentus still preserved in the rock. A mostly complete but undescribed specimen of C. lentus from Dinosaur National Monument is displayed at the Smithsonian.

== Classification ==
- Shunosaurus
- - Mamenchisauridae
  - - Turiasauria
    - Neosauropoda
      - Diplodocoidea
        - Haplocanthosaurus
        - - Rebbachisauridae
          - - Dicraeosauridae
            - Diplodocidae
      - Macronaria
        - - Camarasaurus
          - Lourinhasaurus
        - - Aragosaurus
          - - Brachiosauridae
            - Somphospondyli

The phylogenetic position of Camarasaurus within Eusauropoda, simplified from Mannion et al. 2019

As a species of Camarasaurus, C. lentus belongs to Camarasauridae, a family of basal macronarian sauropods. It is one of four species of Camarasaurus widely regarded as valid, alongside C. supremus, C. grandis, and C. lewisi.

Camarasaurus lentus has two junior subjective synonyms, Uintasaurus douglassi and Camarasaurus annae. Uintasaurus douglassi is the type species of Uintasaurus.

Due to the close similarity between C. lentus and C. supremus, it has been at times debated whether C. lentus is distinct from the latter. Takehito Ikejiri has noted that, as the holotype of C. lentus is a juvenile, the features used to distinguish between different species in adults of the genus cannot be identified, and the specimen came from a part of the Morrison Formation where C. grandis is more typically found. As such, the holotype of C. lentus may actually be a specimen of C. grandis, rather than belonging to the species conventionally known as C. lentus.

== Paleobiology ==
=== Ontogeny ===
Camarasaurus lentus is known from several growth stages, so its ontogeny is relatively well-understood. As C. lentus grew, its neck lengthened. The extent of neural spine bifurcation may have increased with age; in the younger CM 11338, the first cervical vertebra to have a partially bifurcated neural spine is the seventh, whereas in the older YPM 1910, bifurcation begins with the fifth. The limb bones show nearly isometric growth, but become slightly slenderer with age.

== Paleoecology ==
Camarasaurus lentus lived during the late Kimmeridgian and early Tithonian ages of the Jurassic in what is now the western United States. The Dinosaur Quarry of Dinosaur National Monument, one of the sites where C. lentus has been found, dates to between 150.91 and 150.04 million years ago. The range of C. lentus includes what is now Utah, Colorado, Wyoming, and possibly South Dakota. Camarasaurus lentus fossils have been found in systems tract B4 of the Morrison Formation, strata from which have been dated to times ranging from 151.88 Ma to 149.1 Ma. At this time, a large lake, Lake T'oo'dichi', covered an area around what is now the Four Corners area of the western United States.

C. lentus is one of the sauropod species present at the Cleveland-Lloyd Dinosaur Quarry, a controversial site known for its dense accumulation of dinosaur bones and disproportionate abundance of the predatory theropod Allosaurus. One interpretation of the site is that it represents a drought assemblage.

At the Cleveland-Lloyd Dinosaur Quarry, C. lentus has been found to coexist an unidentified apatosaurine, an unidentified diplodocine, Stegosaurus, Camptosaurus, Allosaurus, Ceratosaurus, Stokesosaurus, Marshosaurus, and Torvosaurus. At Carnegie Quarry, it has been found to coexist with Apatosaurus louisae, Diplodocus hallorum, Barosaurus, Stegosaurus, Dryosaurus elderae, Camptosaurus aphanoecetes, Allosaurus, Ceratosaurus, Torvosaurus, and Marshosaurus. Possible Haplocanthosaurus bones have been reported from Carnegie Quarry as well. The WDC specimens of C. lentus, the geologically youngest known of the species, were found at the same site as the apatosaurine skeleton NSMT-PV 20375, which may represent an as-yet unnamed genus and species of sauropod.

C. lentus may be descended from the earlier species C. grandis, and the later species C. supremus may be a descendant of C. lentus. C. supremus first appears in the fossil record shortly before C. lentus disappears.
