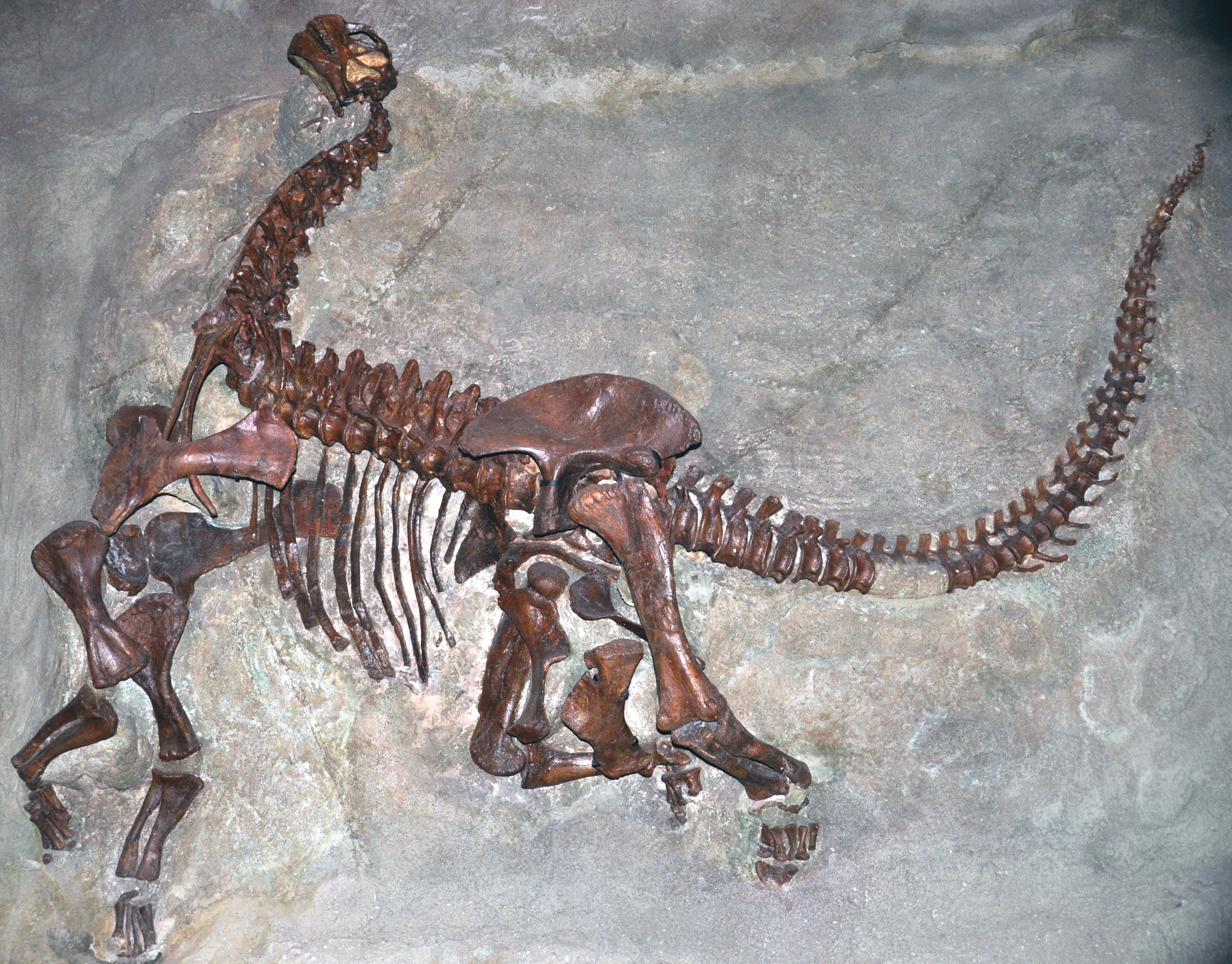
- Skeleton of Camarasaurus

Scientific classification
- Kingdom: Animalia
- Phylum: Chordata
- Clade: Dinosauria
- Clade: Saurischia
- Clade: †Sauropodomorpha
- Clade: †Sauropoda
- Clade: †Neosauropoda
- Clade: †Macronaria
- Clade: †Camarasauromorpha
- Family: †Camarasauridae; Cope, 1877

Type genus
- †Camarasaurus Cope, 1877

Genera
- †Camarasaurus; †Lourinhasaurus?; †Oplosaurus?; †Tehuelchesaurus?

Synonyms
- Morosauridae Marsh, 1882

= Camarasauridae =

Camarasaurids Temporal range: Late Jurassic to Early Cretaceous, 155–145 Ma

Extinct family of dinosaurs

Camarasauridae is a family of sauropod dinosaurs. Among sauropods, camarasaurids are small to medium-sized, with relatively short necks. They are visually identifiable by a short skull with large nares, and broad, spatulate teeth filling a thick jaw. Based on cervical vertebrae and cervical rib biomechanics, camarasaurids most likely moved their necks in a vertical, rather than horizontal, sweeping motion, in contrast to most diplodocids.

== Taxonomy ==
Camarasauridae was named by Edward Drinker Cope in 1877. Its type genus is Camarasaurus, and it is defined as the clade containing all species more closely related to Camarasaurus supremus than Saltasaurus loricatus.

=== Phylogenetic relationships ===
Camarasauridae is typically regarded as belonging to Macronaria, one of the two major branches of Neosauropoda. Within Macronaria, it occupies a basal position, outside of Titanosauriformes. However, some studies have found Camarasauridae to lie outside Neosauropoda.

=== Members ===
Camarasaurus is the only taxon uncontroversially regarded as a valid genus of camarasaurid. It contains four species: C. grandis, C. lentus, C. lewisi, and C. supremus. C. lewisi may represent a distinct genus, Cathetosaurus. Lourinhasaurus, the type species of which was formerly assigned to Camarasaurus, is regarded as a camarasaurid by most studies, though it has also been considered to be a basal eusauropod.

Oplosaurus, from the Early Cretaceous of the United Kingdom, has been suggested to be a camarasaurid, but as it is only known from a tooth, its position within Eusauropoda is difficult to determine. Tehuelchesaurus, from the Late Jurassic of Argentina, has been considered a camarasaurid in some studies, but a wide range of other phylogenetic positions have been proposed, including a close relationship to Omeisaurus, a position in Turiasauria, or as a non-camarasaurid basal macronarian.

Bellusaurus, which is only known from juvenile remains, may be a camarasaurid, though it has also been considered a basal macronarian, turiasaur, or mamenchisaurid.

==== Former members ====
In 1970, Rodney Steel took an expansive concept of Camarasauridae, encompassing all sauropods then known except diplodocoids and titanosaurs. In 1990, John S. McIntosh regarded Camarasauridae as made up of two subfamilies: Camarasaurinae, containing Camarasaurus, Aragosaurus, Euhelopus, and Tienshanosaurus, and Opisthocoelicaudiinae, containing Opisthocoelicaudia and Chondrosteosaurus. Dashanpusaurus, from the Middle Jurassic of China, was originally described as a camarasaurid, but was subsequently found to be a basal macronarian by phylogenetic analysis.

== Diagnostic characters ==
Several skeletal features have been used to characterize the camarasaurids. In the skull, these include an external narial diameter approximately 40% of the long-axis length of the skull, an arched internarial bar, a short muzzle anterior to the nares, and maxillary shelf. In the rest of the axial skeleton, these include flat ventral faces on the cervical vertebrae, a triangular flare to the neural spines of the middle and posterior dorsal vertebrae, and a concave posterior surface to the anterior thoracic ribs, as well as an external haemal canal across the anterior vertebrae of the tail. A reduction to two carpals, long metacarpals relative to the radius, and a twisted ischial shaft serve to identify the appendicular skeleton.

== Palaeobiogeography ==
Broadly speaking, camarasaurids occupied a distribution limited to the Laurasian continent during the Upper Jurassic. Most currently accepted camarasaurid specimens have been discovered in the Morrison Formation of North America, however some specimens from the African Tendaguru Formation have been speculated to belong to the genus Camarasaurus, and the closely related Lourinhasaurus was found in Portugal.

== Palaeoecology ==
Dental microwear indicates that camarasaurids had a narrow ecological niche breadth, as variability in microwear patterns between different camarasaurids is very low, and that they likely frequently migrated in search of new food sources. In North America, camarasaurids filled a similar niche to turiasaurs, while in Europe, where turiasaurs were present, camarasaurids and turiasaurs occupied clearly distinct niches due to niche partitioning.
