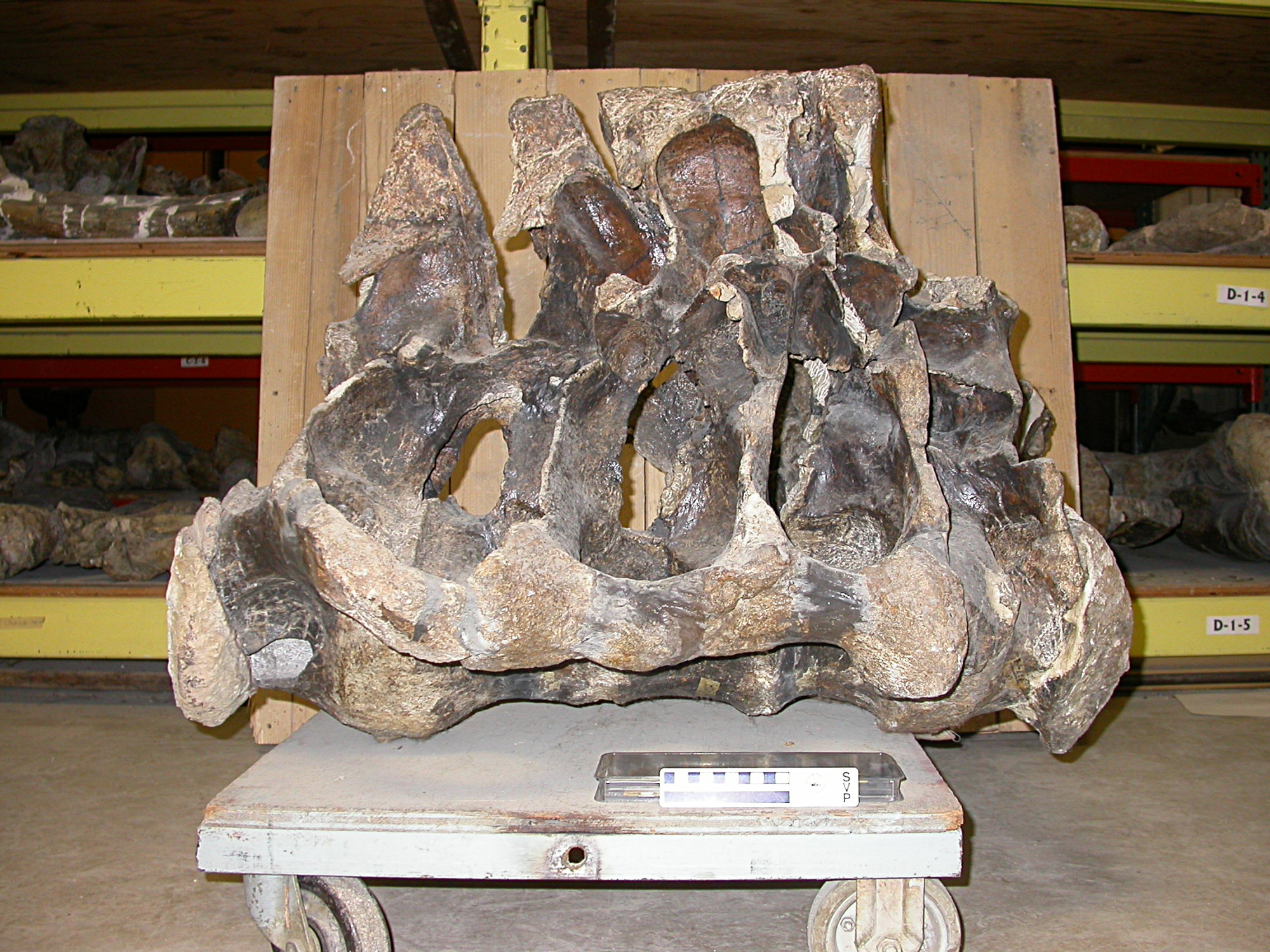
- Sacrum of holotype BYU 9047

Scientific classification
- Kingdom: Animalia
- Phylum: Chordata
- Class: Reptilia
- Clade: Dinosauria
- Clade: Saurischia
- Clade: †Sauropodomorpha
- Clade: †Sauropoda
- Clade: †Macronaria
- Family: †Camarasauridae
- Genus: †Camarasaurus
- Species: †C. lewisi

Binomial name
- †Camarasaurus lewisi (Jensen, 1988) McIntosh, 1990

Synonyms
- Cathetosaurus lewisi Jensen, 1988

= Camarasaurus lewisi =

Camarasaurus lewisi Temporal range: Late Jurassic, 155–145 Ma

Species of sauropod dinosaur

Camarasaurus lewisi is a species of sauropod dinosaur from the Upper Jurassic of the United States. It was named by James A. Jensen in 1988. C. lewisi was originally placed in its own genus, Cathetosaurus, but in 1996 it was reclassified as a species of Camarasaurus; most researchers since have considered it to be one of the four valid species of Camarasaurus. Two unpublished studies have since argued that the genus Cathetosaurus should be reinstated, whereas two other studies have argued that C. lewisi may be a junior synonym of another species of Camarasaurus.

== Description ==
C. lewisi is the smallest species assigned to Camarasaurus; despite representing a very old individual, the holotype specimen is roughly 26% smaller than C. supremus, with a humerus 101.8 centimetres (40.1 in) long. The possible C. lewisi specimen SMA 0002 also represents a fully mature individual, but is exceptionally small, with a humerus only 70.5 centimetres (27.8 in) long. It is possible that the size difference reflects sexual dimorphism. Frank Seebacher estimated the length of C. lewisi as 15.4 metres (51 ft) and mass as 11.7 tonnes, whereas Gregory S. Paul estimated the length of C. lewisi as 13 metres (43 ft) and mass as 10 tonnes.

C. lewisi was relatively long-necked compared to most specimens of Camarasaurus.

In 1996, six traits were indicated distinguishing C. lewisi from other species. The bifurcated vertebrae of the neck and back have a narrow but deep cleft incising the tops of the neural spines, resulting in a V-shaped transverse profile instead of the U-shaped profile typical of Camarasaurus species. The bifurcation continues to the sacrum, instead of ending in the middle of the back as is typical of Camarasaurus. The first sacral vertebra is more strongly "sacralised" and the fifth, last, sacral vertebra is less strongly sacralised than typical in Camarasaurus. The costal plate of the sacrum is more strongly developed than typical of Camarasaurus, even compared to very old individuals of these. The ilium is rotated to the front and below, relative to the longitudinal axis of the sacrum. In the rear chevrons the rear facets make a steep angle of 60° with the horizontal plane while the front facets are placed horizontally. However, several of these characteristics may reflect the old age of the specimen, rather than distinctive characteristics of the species. It would then be a "ontogimorph". Mateus and Tschopp proposed three diagnostic characteristics for C. lewisi present in the holotype: the pelvis is rotated anteriorly, such that the pubis projects posteroventrally, and the ischium projects posteriorly (1), lateroventrally projecting spurs in the neural spines of the last dorsals (2); and posterior cervical and anterior dorsal diapophyses bearing an anterior projection lateral to the prezygapophyses (3).

The pelvis of C. lewisi is rotated forward relative to the sacrum, such that the preacetabular process of the ilium is oriented to point 20° below the axis of the sacrum. Jensen regarded this as one of the most distinctive characteristics of the taxon, and both McIntosh et al. and Mateus and Tschopp included it in their list of diagnostic characteristics for the taxon. However, the condition in other species of Camarasaurus is not entirely clear. In 1921, Osborn and Mook reconstructed the pelvis of C. supremus without the rotation. The condition is unclear in C. grandis, due to the lack of articulated pelves, but the disarticulated ilium of one specimen appears it would not exhibit such a strongly rotated condition. Specimens of C. lentus exhibit a rotated pelvis, but the precise angle is difficult to confirm due to distortion of the bones and may be less than in C. lewisi.

The holotype of C. lewisi lacks a skull, but based on the specimen SMA 0002, which may belong to the species, the skull possesses several diagnostic characteristics: frontals with anterior midline projection into the nasals (1); trapezoidal supraoccipital (more expanded dorsally than ventrally) (2); lateral spur on the dorsal part of the lacrimal (3); fenestrated pterygoid (4); and the large pineal foramen between the frontals (5).

The specimen SMA 0002, which may belong to C. lewisi, has unusual proportions. It has an exceptionally large skull, which is roughly 58% the length of the femur, leading to it being described as "bobbleheaded". Nearly all sauropodomorphs have a skull less than 50% of the length of the femur, but several Camarasaurus specimens of varying species possess such "bobbleheaded" proportions, which may be due to individual variation or sexual dimorphism. The limbs are shorter in proportion to the body, particularly due to especially short lower limb elements, such that it has been described as "dachshund reminiscent". The ribs are long, extending below knee level. Due to the length of the ribs and the rotation of the pelvis, the taxon would have had an atypically large gut volume.

== History of study ==
The holotype specimen of C. lewisi was discovered in 1967 by Vivian and Daniel Jones in Pit 1 of the Dominguez/Jones Quarry, near the confluence of the Little Dominguez Creek and the Big Dominguez Creek. They warned James A. Jensen, the preparator of the Brigham Young University who collected the find. The specimen was found in the Brushy Basin Member of the Morrison Formation, in Mesa County, Colorado. Jensen named and described it as a new genus and species, Cathetosaurus lewisi, in 1988. The genus name means "perpendicular lizard" (from Ancient Greek: κάθετος, romanized: káthetos, lit. 'perpendicular'), in reference to Jensen's hypothesis that the animal was adept at rearing onto its hind legs. The specific name honors Jensen's mentor Arnold David Lewis, the preparator of the Harvard Museum of Natural History.

=== Classification ===
When Jensen first named C. lewisi, he assigned it to a new genus of camarasaurid, Cathetosaurus. In 1996, John S. McIntosh and colleagues synonymized Cathetosaurus with Camarasaurus, noting that most of the differences proposed by Jensen pertained to the maturity of the specimen, but retained C. lewisi as a distinct species; this assignment was followed by later reviews of sauropod taxonomy. In 2005, Takehito Ikejiri noted that C. lewisi did not clearly differ from C. grandis, with which it was contemporary, and therefore may be synonymous with it. Two unpublished studies, presented at the 2013 and 2014 annual meetings of the Society of Vertebrate Paleontology by Octávio Mateus and Emanuel Tschopp, reevaluated the taxonomy of Camarasaurus and concluded that Cathetosaurus should be regarded as a separate genus from Camarasaurus after all, though subsequent papers by Tschopp have included C. lewisi within Camarasaurus without comment, or expressed uncertainty over whether C. lewisi belonged to Camarasaurus or Cathetosaurus. In 2017, Cary Woodruff and John Foster argued that most of the putative distinguishing traits of C. lewisi were indicative of old age, suggesting that C. lewisi may be based on an old individual of another Camarasaurus species. Most researchers consider C. lewisi to be one of the four valid species of Camarasaurus.

=== Specimens ===
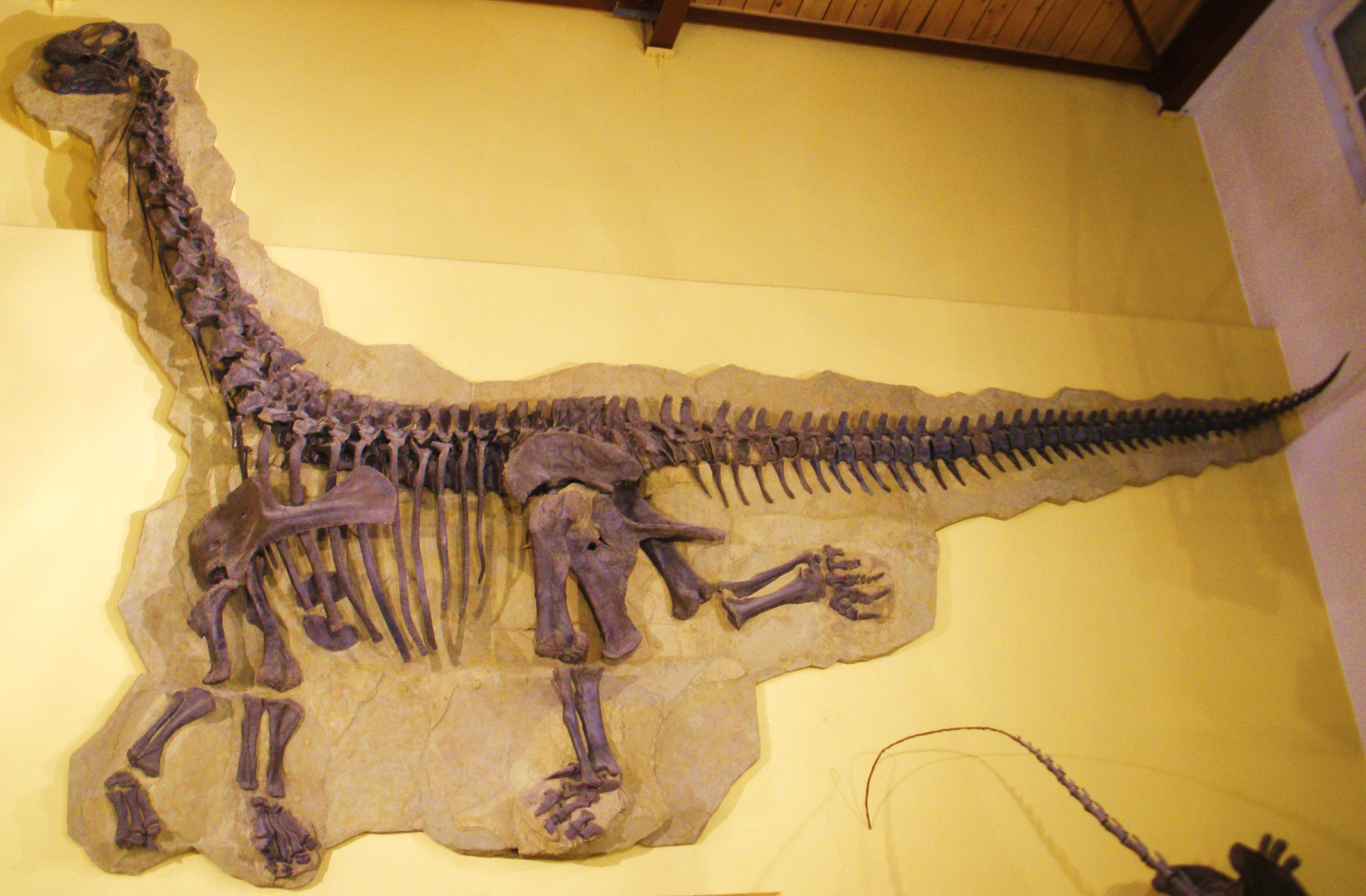
Specimen SMA 0002, which has at times been assigned to C. lewisi

The holotype and only definite specimen of C. lewisi is BYU 9047 (Note: Incorrectly reported as BYU 9740 in the original description), a mostly complete specimen representing an old individual. It consists of a partial skeleton lacking the skull, the still present occiput probably not having been collected due its poor quality. It contains the vertebral column from the first neck vertebra onwards to the forty-third tail vertebra; neck ribs; twenty dorsal ribs; twenty-six chevrons; the right forelimb; the left pelvis and the right ischium. According to Michael P. Taylor, as of 2022, the holotype of C. lewisi was one of only nine described sauropod specimens to preserve all of the cervical vertebrae, though not all the vertebrae are well-preserved.

An unpublished study by Octávio Mateus and Emanuel Tschopp referred a second specimen, SMA 0002, to the species, but subsequent study has regarded the specimen as belonging to an indeterminate species of Camarasaurus. The precise affinities of SMA 0002 remain uncertain; it is the geologically oldest Camarasaurus specimen and, despite representing a mature individual, is much smaller than most adult Camarasaurus specimens and may represent a distinct small species. Another unpublished study by Tschopp, Mateus, and colleagues found a third specimen, GMNH-PV 101, to form a clade with SMA 0002 and the C. lewisi holotype. GMNH-PV 101 had originally been described as a specimen of Camarasaurus grandis.
