= Hudiesaurus =

Hudiesaurus Temporal range: Late Kimmeridgian-Tithonian ~154–143 Ma
- Size chart, with the holotype vertebra in white

Scientific classification
- Kingdom: Animalia
- Phylum: Chordata
- Class: Reptilia
- Clade: Dinosauria
- Clade: Saurischia
- Clade: †Sauropodomorpha
- Clade: †Sauropoda
- Family: †Mamenchisauridae
- Genus: †Hudiesaurus; Dong, 1997
- Species: †H. sinojapanorum

Binomial name
- †Hudiesaurus sinojapanorum Dong, 1997

Genus of mamenchisaurid dinosaurs

Hudiesaurus (meaning "butterfly lizard") is an extinct genus of mamenchisaurid sauropod dinosaur that lived in present-day China during the Late Jurassic period. It was described by Chinese paleontologist Dong Zhiming in 1997. The genus contains a single species, Hudiesaurus sinojapanorum, named based on a single vertebra. However, he also assigned teeth and limb bones from a nearby locality to H. sinojapanorum. These fossils were unearthed by the Sino-Japanese Silk Road Expedition near Qiketai in Shanshan, Xinjiang province in rock layers coming from the Kalaza Formation. This formation dates to between the Late Kimmeridgian and Tithonian stages of the Late Jurassic, 154 to 143 million years ago. Dong believed that the vertebra was a dorsal (trunk) vertebra, but later analysis suggested that it is one of the last cervical (neck) vertebrae. In 2021, the limb bones were assigned to a distinct genus of sauropod, Rhomaleopakhus, and the teeth were classified as an indeterminate eusauropod.

Hudiesaurus is one of the largest dinosaurs known, possibly reaching 32 metres (105 ft) in length and 55 tonnes (61 short tons) in body mass. However, if the vertebra is a dorsal vertebra the length would be closer to 30.5 metres (100 ft) and the mass around 44 tonnes (49 short tons). Its vertebra is robust, large, and wide, with a width of 539 millimetres (21.2 in). The neural spine (the uppermost part of a vertebra) is bifurcated (split at the top), indicating that Hudiesaurus had strong lateral control over its neck. On the sides of the centrum (body of the vertebra) are pleurocoels (large cavities) which would store pneumatic air sacs.

Hudiesaurus is a member of the family Mamenchisauridae, though its exact relation to other members is uncertain. This is a group of sauropods with longer necks and shorter tails compared to other families like diplodocids and dicraeosaurids. Being a mamenchisaurid, Hudiesaurus was likely a low or medium-browsing, four-legged herbivore. Hudiesaurus coexisted with many other dinosaurs such as the sauropods Rhomaleopakhus and the dubious Chiayusaurus, the dubious theropod Szechuanosaurus, and an indeterminate megalosaurid theropod.

== Discovery ==
Fossils of Hudiesaurus were first discovered in 1993 by members of the Sino-Japanese Silk Road Dinosaur Expedition in the Turpan Basin near the town of Lanngou in Qiketai, Xinjiang Uyghur Autonomous Region in western China. This expedition, led by Japanese and Chinese paleontologists, explored dinosaur-bearing outcrops in western China throughout the 1990s. The remains found consisted of a presacral (before the sacral) vertebra, cataloged as IVPP V11120 at the Institute of Vertebrate Paleontology and Paleoanthropology in Beijing, from one quarry as well as an incomplete right forelimb (IVPP V11121-1) and four teeth (IVPP V11121-2) from a quarry about 1 kilometre (0.62 mi) away. These two different quarries correspond to the lower horizon of the Kalazha Formation, which dates to the late Kimmeridgian-Tithonian ages of the Late Jurassic period.

In 1997, Chinese paleontologist Dong Zhiming scientifically described the remains and assigned them to a new genus and species of sauropod, which he named Hudiesaurus sinojapanorum. The generic name Hudiesaurus derives from the Chinese Pinyin "Hudie" for butterfly, in reference to the bifurcated (split) neural spines of the vertebra, and the Latin root "sauros" meaning "lizard", a common suffix for dinosaur names. The specific name sinojapanorum refers to the members of the Sino-Japan Silk Road Dinosaur Expedition and sino for where the fossil was discovered, but can also be read as "central part" in Chinese, a reference to the Japanese Chunichi Shimbun (again meaning "central part") press group, which financed the Sino-Japanese Silk Road Expedition. The presacral vertebra, which Dong believed was a mid-dorsal vertebra, was selected as the holotype specimen (the single specimen the species is based on), whereas the forelimb and teeth were assigned to Hudiesaurus despite having no overlap with the holotype and coming from a different locality. In 2004, the assignment of the forelimb and teeth to Hudiesaurus was criticized by Paul Upchurch and colleagues, who noted that there was no sufficient evidence to refer those fossils to the taxon. Subsequently in a 2021 study, Upchurch, Philip Mannion, Xing Xu, and Paul Barrett redescribed Hudiesaurus and restricted the known material of the taxon to the holotype vertebra. The teeth were reclassified as belonging to an indeterminate eusauropod, potentially a mamenchisaurid, and the forelimb was designated the holotype of a new genus and species, Rhomaleopakhus turpanensis.

== Description ==
Being a mamenchisaurid sauropod, Hudiesaurus was likely a large, quadrupedal herbivore. Due to their long necks, sauropods evolved high shoulders, strong presacral vertebrae, and large scapulae to compensate. The bifurcated neural spines of Hudiesaurus would have allowed for more lateral control over its neck, which paleontologists Mark Hallet and Matt Wedel theorized was beneficial for high-browsing. However, other studies have noted that this is indicative of a horizontal neck and feeding posture. Mamenchisaurus, a relative of Hudiesaurus, has been suggested to have been a low or medium browser with a horizontal neck posture.

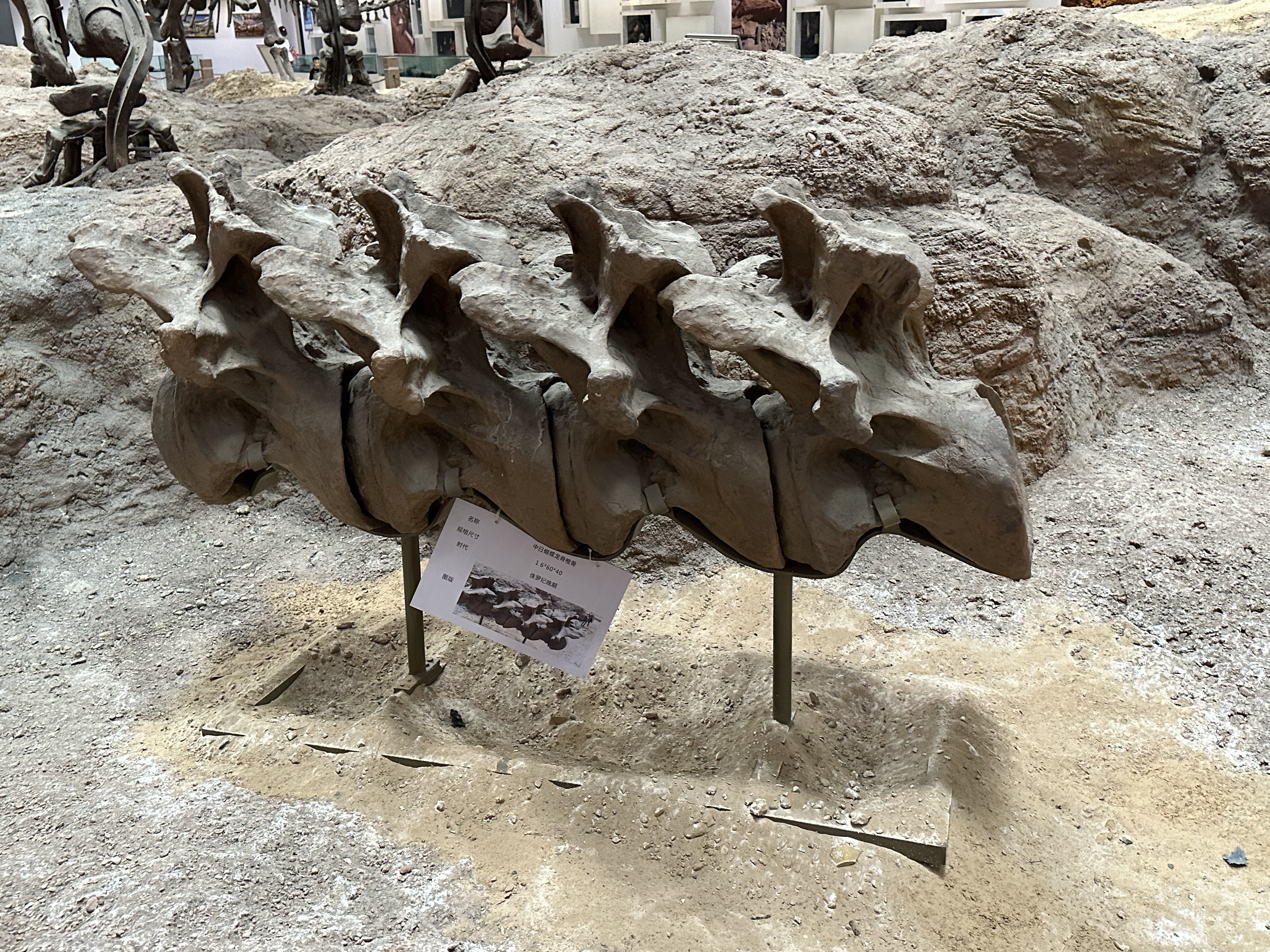
Casts of the holotype vertebra

Hudiesaurus is believed to have been among the largest sauropods given the considerable length of the holotype centrum of 55 centimetres (22 in), though this is difficult to confirm due to a lack of fossils. Its body length was initially estimated at 20–30 metres (66–98 ft). In 2016, Gregory S. Paul estimated its length at 25 metres (82 ft) and its weight at 25 tonnes (28 short tons). In their book Dinosaurs Facts and Figures, researchers Rubén Molina-Pérez and Asier Larremendi estimated Hudiesaurus to be 30.5 metres (100 ft) in length with a shoulder height of 5.5 metres (18 ft) and mass of 44 tonnes (49 short tons) if the vertebra is a dorsal vertebra. However, they noted that if the vertebra is a cervical vertebra, its length would be 32 metres (105 ft) and its weight 55 tonnes (61 short tons). In 2021, Upchurch and colleagues suggested that the vertebra may be cervical instead of dorsal, suggesting that the animal would be at 32 metres (105 ft) and 55 tonnes (61 short tons).

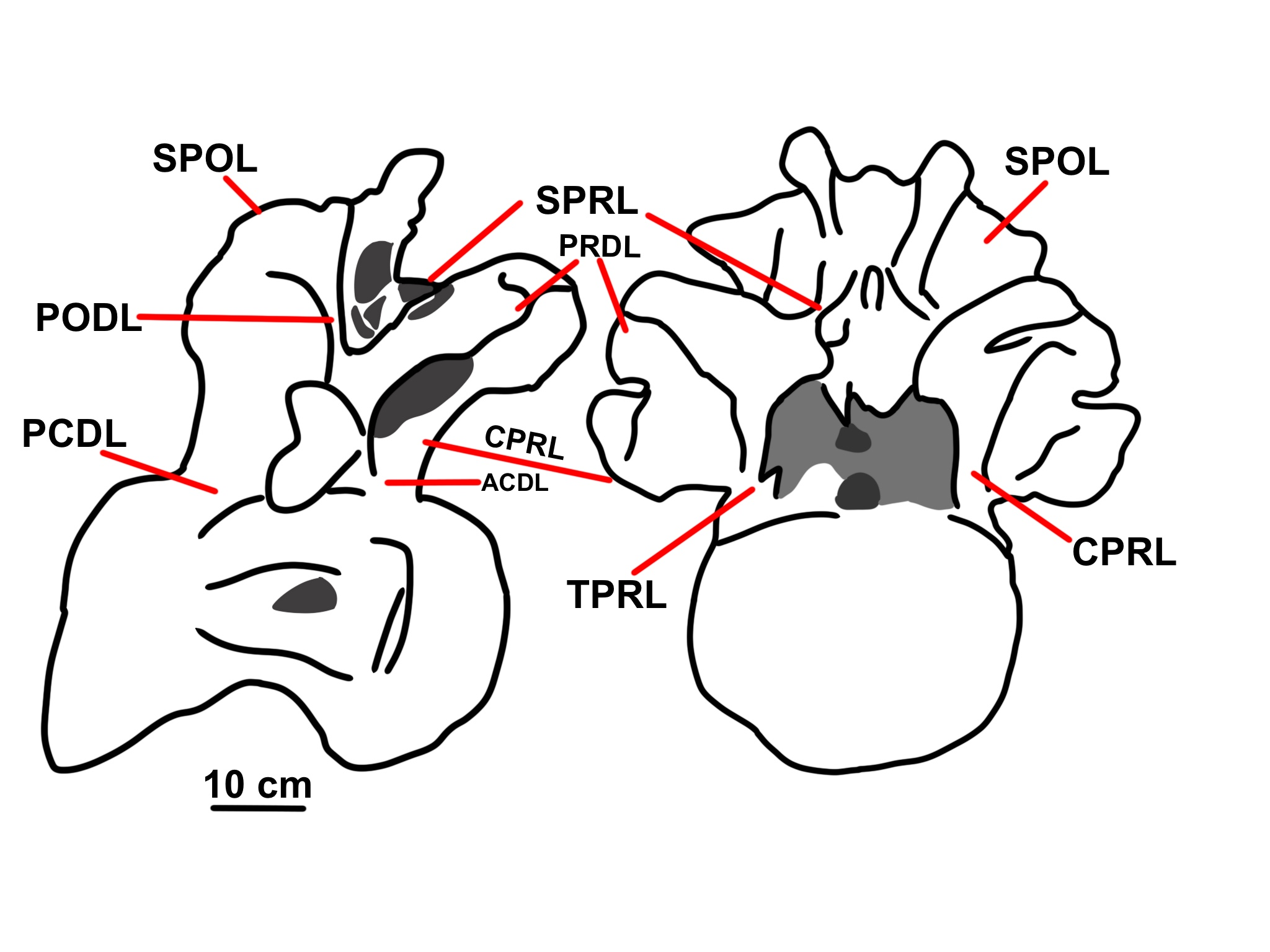
Holotype with laminae labelled

=== Vertebrae ===
The vertebra is large, measuring 760 millimetres (30 in) in height, 466 millimetres (18.3 in) in anteroposterior (front-to-back) length including the condyle (round end at front of vertebral centrum), and 539 millimetres (21.2 in) in transverse (horizontal) width across the prezygapophyses (forward-extending bony projections for articulation). The lack of ribs attached to the parapophyses and the short, low transverse processes on the lateral faces of the vertebra indicate it is an anterior dorsal or posterior cervical vertebra, in contrast to Dong's hypothesis that it was a mid-dorsal. The vertebra is nearly complete, though much of the right diapophysis was damaged and restored with plaster. Overall, the centrum is subcircular in outline, though is wider transversely (horizontally) than dorsoventrally (vertically). Its centrum is strongly opisthocoelous (having a convex front and a concave rear) with a long keel along its ventral (bottom) face, traits found in flagellicaudatans and other mamenchisaurids. Large pleurocoels (openings that contained large air cavities) are present on the lateral (side) surfaces of the centrum. This is a common trait among sauropods and was used to keep bones light. As for the prezygapophyses, they are large, convex, and have a dorsally (upward) directed articular facet. The neural spines are bifurcated (divided) and form a U-shaped shallow cleft, a characteristic found in relatives like Mamenchisaurus. Additionally, a wing-like process (extension of bone) is found in-between the base of the postzygapophyses (backward-extending bony projections for articulation) and the lateral edges of the neural spine.

Although many of these traits were thought to be diagnostic by Dong, Upchurch and colleagues found only five diagnostic traits in 2021, most of which involved the vertebra's distinct laminae. Laminae are thin sheets of bone that stretch between the various processes (protrusions) of a vertebra, after which they are named. For example, the centrodiapophyseal lamina stretches from the vertebral body (centro-) to the diapophysis (the sidewards facing process that connects to the rib). The centrodiapophyseal lamina of Hudiesaurus is unique in that it is divided at its midsection, whereas it is contiguous in related genera. At the front end of the vertebra, the spinoprezygapophyseal lamina (stretching between the neural spine and the prezygapophysis) is bifurcated close to the base of the metapophysis (a small projection on the articular surfaces of the zygapophysis). A similar lamina at the rear face of the vertebra, the spinopostzygapophyseal lamina (between the neural spine and the postzygapophysis) is bifurcated immediately above the postzygapophysis. Other unique features include the small projection on the junction between the neural arches and the vertebral body, just above the lateral pneumatic opening on the neural spine. Along the dorsal surface of the prezygapophyseal process (an extension of bone making up the prezygapophysis) are five-to-six small coels (openings).

== Classification ==
Hudiesaurus belonged to the family Mamenchisauridae, a group of sauropods that existed during the Jurassic and Cretaceous in Asia and Africa. This group includes several other large sauropods, including Mamenchisaurus, Xinjiangtitan, Omeisaurus, and Klamelisaurus. Xinjiangtitan and Mamenchisaurus sinocanodorum were comparable in size to Hudiesaurus, being 30–32 metres (98–105 ft) and 26 meters (85 ft) long respectively. The position of Hudiesaurus within Mamenchisauridae has been contentious; Dong considered Hudiesaurus a mamenchisaurid based on comparisons with Mamenchisaurus. However, Upchurch stated that Hudiesaurus was an indeterminate eusauropod. In the 2021 description of Rhomaleopakhus, Upchurch and colleagues proposed that Hudiesaurus was a member of the Mamenchisauridae, in an unresolved polytomy with two Mamenchisaurus species (M. youngi and an assigned specimen of M. hochuanensis) and Xinjiagtitan, as well as a clade containing the holotype of M. hochuanensis, Klamelisaurus, and two unnamed specimens. These results are displayed in the cladogram shown below:

- Mamenchisauridae
  - Tienshanosaurus
  - - Omeisaurus junghsiensis
    - - Wamweracaudia
      - - - "Mamenchisaurus" sinocanadorum
          - Qijianglong
        - - - Analong
            - - Chuanjiesaurus
              - Rhomaleopakhus
          - - Hudiesaurus
            - "Mamenchisaurus" hochuanensis (referred)
            - "Mamenchisaurus" youngi
            - Xinjiangtitan
            - - "Mamenchisaurus" hochuanensis (holotype)
              - - Shishugou cervicodorsals
                - - Klamelisaurus
                  - Phu Kradung taxon

The 2023 redescription of Mamenchisaurus sinocanadorum incorporated updated versions of a matrix from Moore and colleagues, 2020. This study did not find Hudiesaurus in polytomy with other mamenchisaurids, instead placing it in a clade with Daanosaurus and an assigned specimen of M. hochuanensis. These results are displayed in the cladogram below:

- Mamenchisauridae
  - Tienshanosaurus
  - - Omeisaurus junghsiensis
    - - Wamweracaudia
      - - Qijianglong
        - - Mamenchisaurus constructus
          - Bellusaurus
          - - - Rhomaleopakhus
              - - Chuanjiesaurus
                - Analong
            - - Mamenchisaurus youngi
              - - - Mamenchisaurus hochuanensis (holotype)
                  - - Shishugou cervicodorsals
                    - - Phu Krandung taxon
                      - Klamelisaurus
                - - - Mamenchisaurus sinocanadorum
                    - Xinjiangtitan
                  - - Hudiesaurus
                    - - Daanosaurus
                      - Mamenchisaurus hochuanensis (referred)

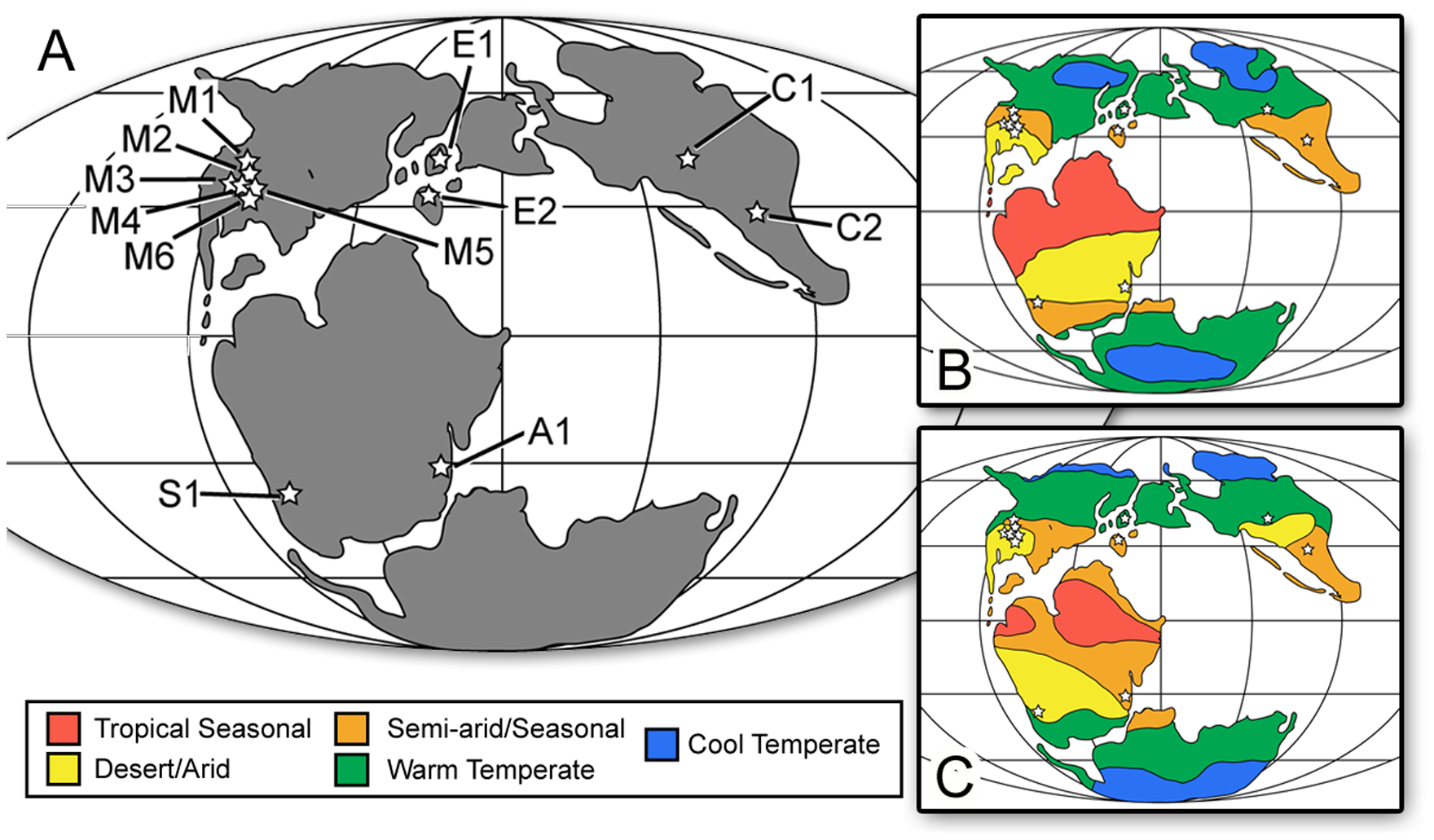
Map of the world during the Late Jurassic, with the Kalaza Formation marked as C1

== Paleoecology ==
Hudiesaurus is known from the lower section of the Kalaza Formation in China, one of several fossiliferous formations in the Turpan Basin and Junggar Basin. The Kalaza Formation is Late Jurassic in age, overlying the Middle Jurassic-aged Qigu and Shishugou Formations and underlying the Early Cretaceous-aged Tugulu Group. The Kalaza Formation itself is composed of thick red sandstones in mudstones deposited in terrestrial or fluvial environments. It was warm and seasonally dry, though towards the Cretaceous it transitioned to arid or semi-arid, during the Late Jurassic, with alluvial deltas running through the area. Although suggested to be from the Qigu Formation in 2015 by Xing Xu and colleagues, The Hudiesaurus holotype is definitively known from the Kalaza Formation.

Other dinosaurs known from this formation include the mamenchisaurid Rhomaleopakhus, the dubious sauropod Chiayusaurus, an indeterminate megalosaurid theropod, and the dubious theropod Szechuanosaurus.
