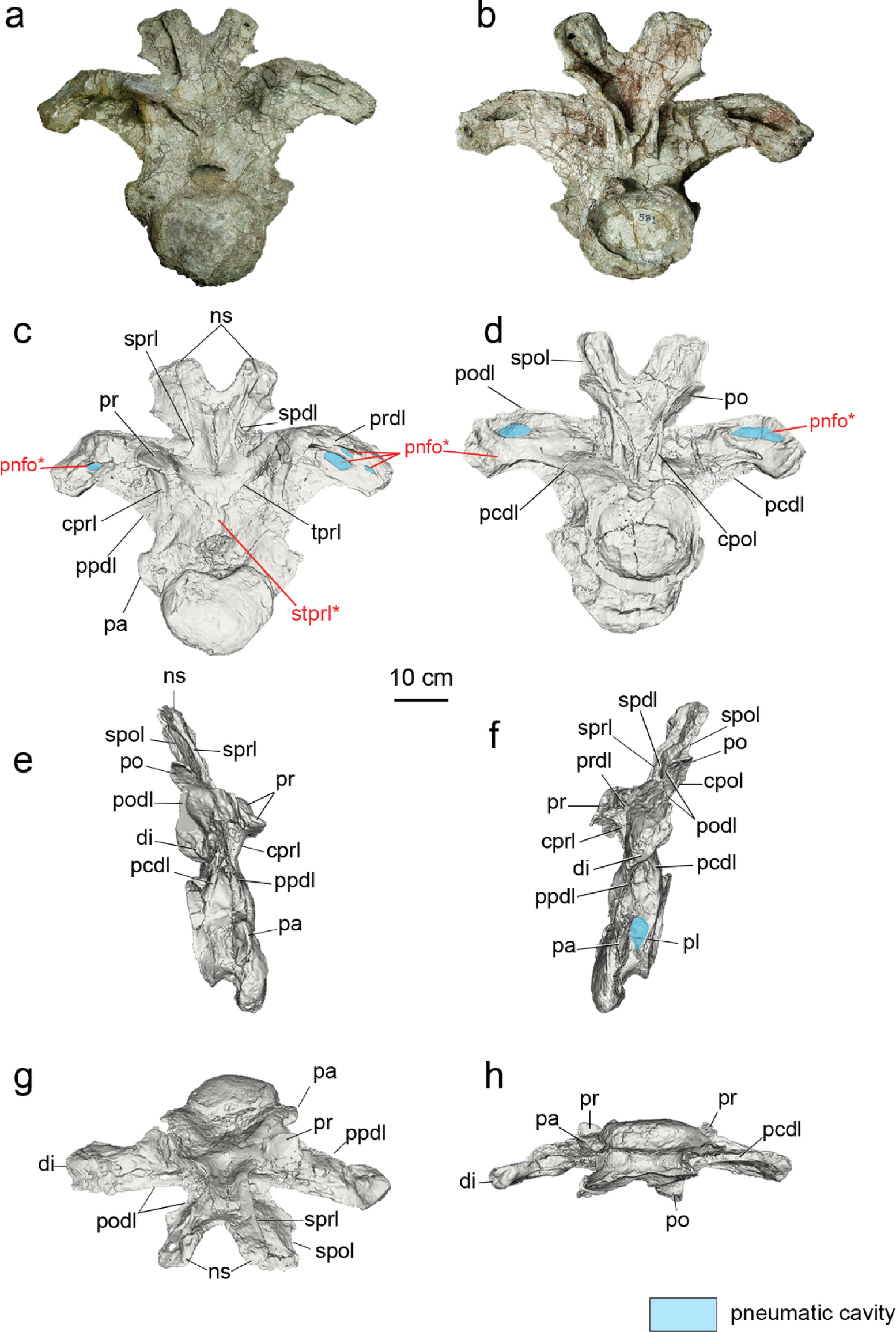
- Holotype vertebra

Scientific classification
- Kingdom: Animalia
- Phylum: Chordata
- Class: Reptilia
- Clade: Dinosauria
- Clade: Saurischia
- Clade: †Sauropodomorpha
- Clade: †Sauropoda
- Family: †Mamenchisauridae
- Genus: †Uragasaurus; Nilpanapan et al., 2026
- Species: †U. kalasinensis

Binomial name
- †Uragasaurus kalasinensis Nilpanapan et al., 2026

= Uragasaurus =

Uragasaurus Temporal range: Late Jurassic

Genus of sauropod dinosaur

Uragasaurus (lit. 'serpent lizard') is an extinct genus of mamenchisaurid sauropod dinosaur known from the Late Jurassic Phu Kradung Formation of Thailand. The genus contains a single species, Uragasaurus kalasinensis, known from a single dorsal (trunk) vertebra. It is the first member of the family Mamenchisauridae named from Thailand.

== Discovery and naming ==
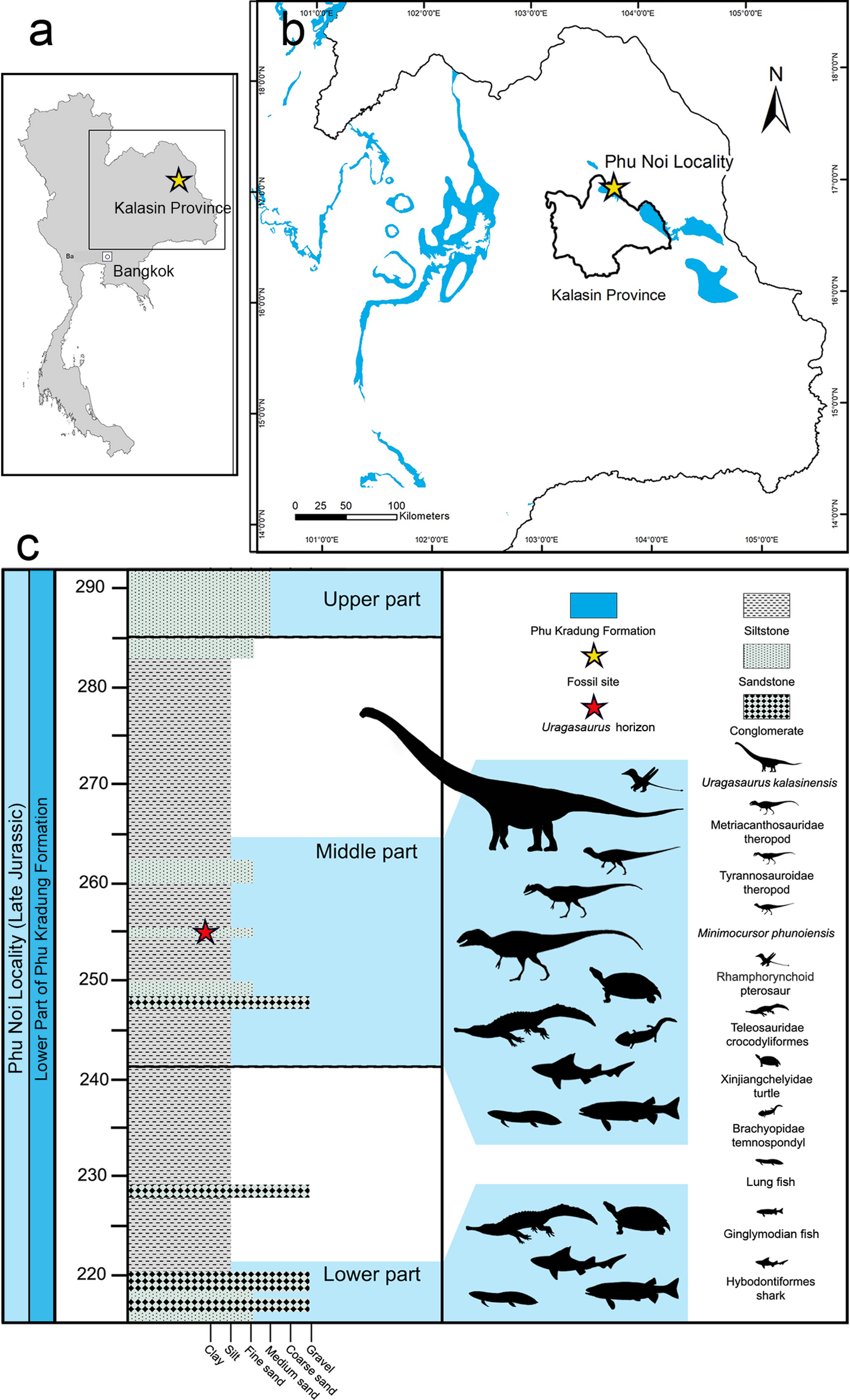
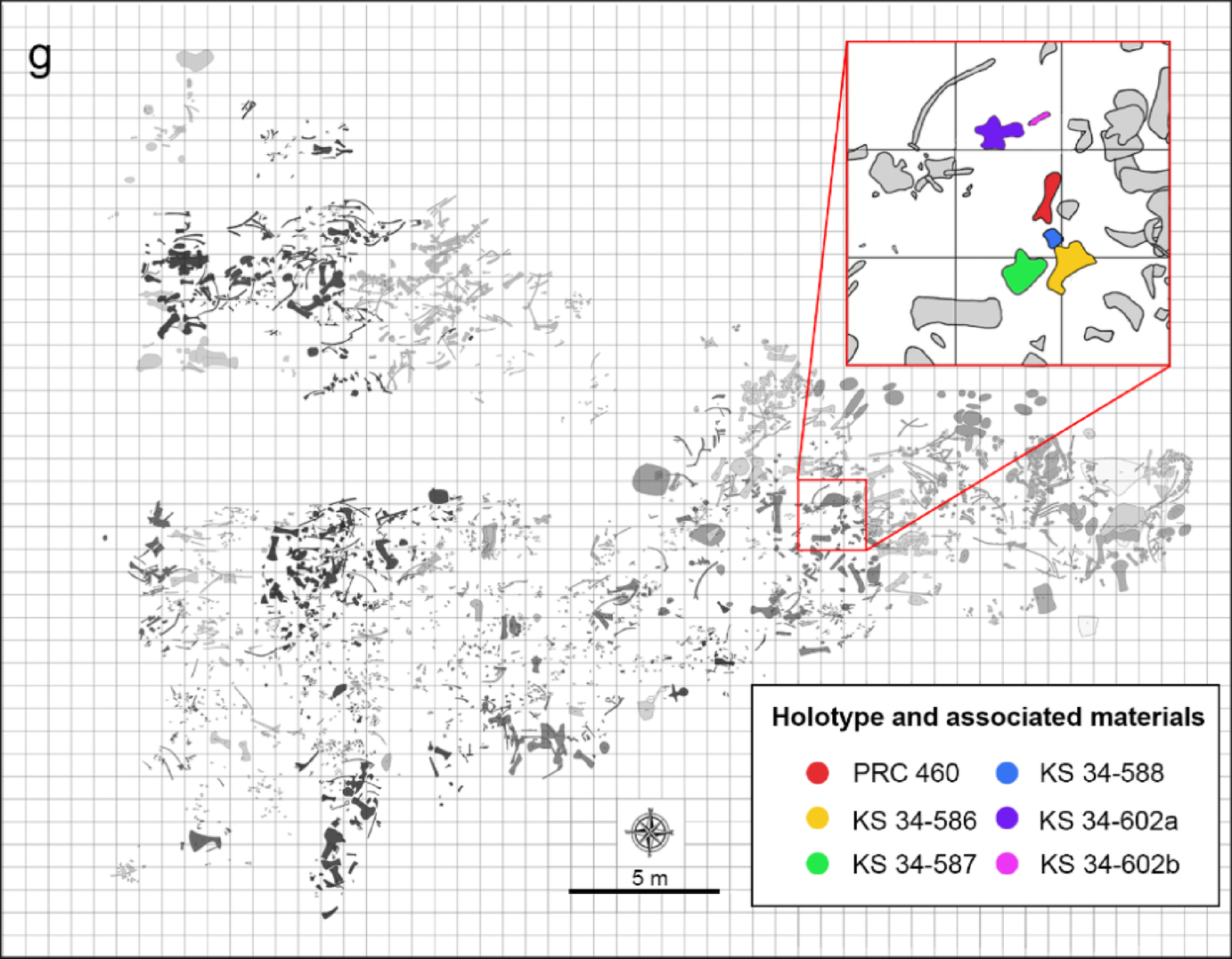
Phu Noi locality: location and stratigraphic column (left) and quarry map (right, PRC 460 in red)

The Uragasaurus fossil material was discovered in outcrops of the lower Phu Kradung Formation (Phu Noi locality), part of the Khorat Group, in Kalasin Province of northeastern Thailand. The specimen is housed in the Palaeontological Research and Education Centre (PRC) at Mahasarakham University, where it is permanently accessioned as specimen PRC 460. It consists of a single anterior (toward the front) dorsal vertebra. Taphonomic compression has flattened the bone anteroposteriorly (from front to back).

In 2026, Apirut Nilpanapan and colleagues described Uragasaurus kalasinensis as a new genus and species of mamenchisaurid sauropod based on these fossil remains, establishing PRC 460 as the holotype specimen. The generic name, Uragasaurus, combines the Sanskrit word उरग, meaning 'serpent' or 'snake', with the Ancient Greek σαῦρος (saûros), meaning 'lizard'. The specific name, kalasinensis, references the discovery of the species in Kalasin Province.

A middle cervical vertebra, right cervical rib, two anterior dorsal vertebral neural arches and a mid-posterior (toward the rear) dorsal vertebra, a left coracoid, and a left fibula were found disarticulated but in close association with the holotype of U. kalasinensis. They cannot be confidently referred to this species due to the absence of shared or diagnostic anatomical features.

An isolated dorsal vertebra from the mid-late Jurassic Khlong Min Formation of Thailand was described by Buffetaut et al. in 2005, which represents the oldest mamenchisaurid occurrence in Southeast Asia. Suteethorn et al. (2013) then described a posterior cervical vertebra from the Phu Kradung Formation (Phu Dan Ma locality). These specimens remained unnamed, making Uragasaurus the first mamenchisaurid from the country to be given a scientific name.

== Description ==
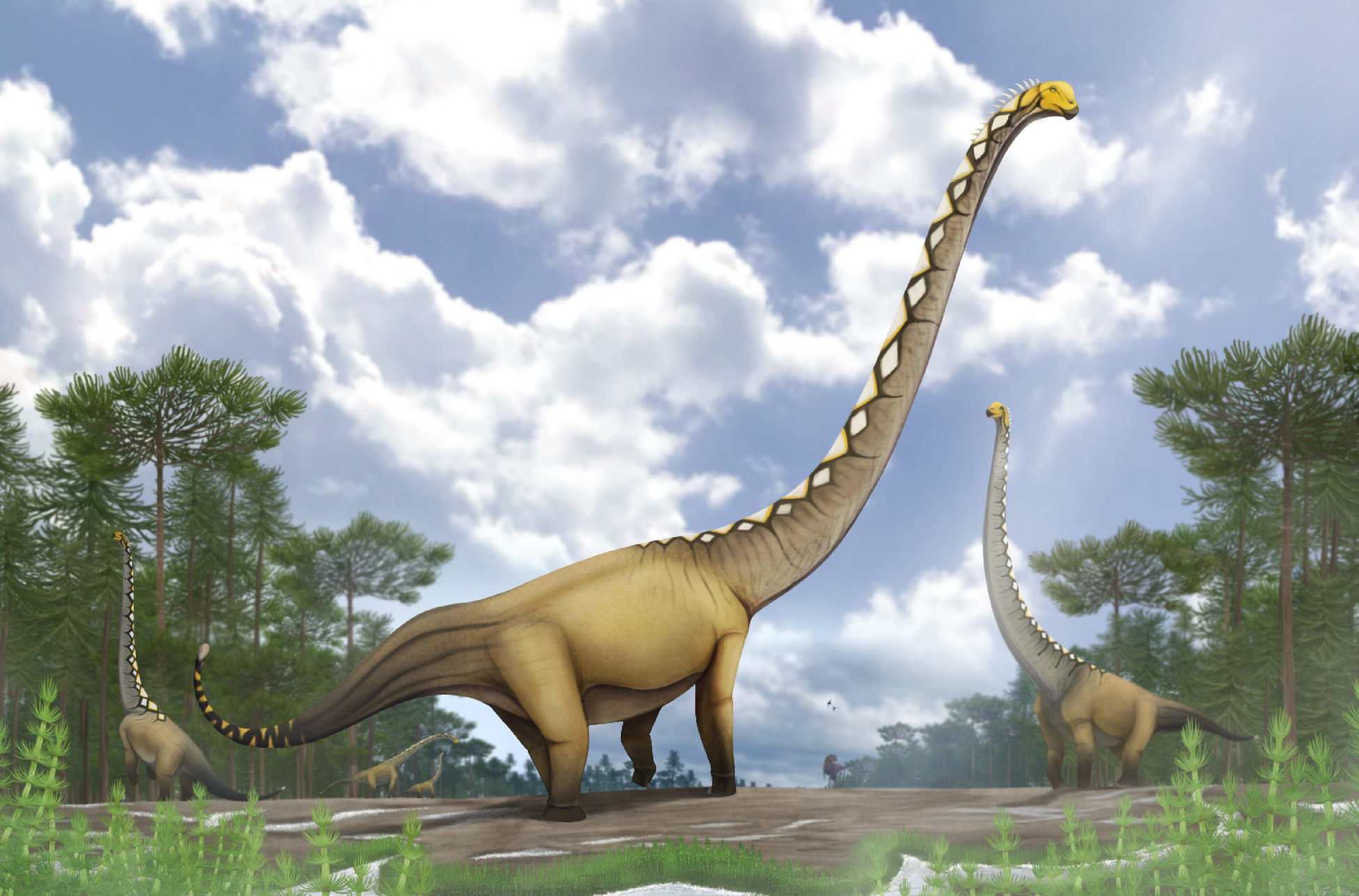
Paleoenvironmental reconstruction of five U. kalasinensis individuals

Nilpanapan et al. (2026) recognized a single autapomorphy (unique derived character) distinguishing Uragasaurus from all other mamenchisaurids: the distal (toward the tip) end of the transverse processes on the anterior dorsal vertebra have a prominent pneumatic fossa in an elongate teardrop shape. More complete relatives are characterized by their greatly elongated necks.

== Classification ==
To test the affinities and relationships of Uragasaurus, Nilpanapan et al. (2026) included it in an updated version of the phylogenetic matrix of Moore et al. (2023). Uragasaurus was recovered as an early-diverging member of the eusauropod clade Mamenchisauridae, diverging after Tienshanosaurus but before Qijianglong. These results are displayed in the cladogram below. The relationships among mamenchisaurids in their analysis were weakly supported, partly due to the fragmentary nature of some taxa, such as Uragasaurus. The clade including Tienshanosaurus and all more derived mamenchisaurids is supported by three anatomical characters, only one of which can be recognized in Uragasaurus: the presence of a bifurcated (split into two) neural spine on the anterior dorsal vertebra.

- Mamenchisauridae
  - - Bellusaurus sui
    - Daanosaurus zhangi
  - - Tienshanosaurus chitaiensis
    - - Uragasaurus kalasinensis
      - - Qijianglong guokr
        - - - Chuanjiesaurus anaensis
            - Mamenchisaurus sanjiangensis
          - - - Wamweracaudia keranjei
              - - Mamenchisaurus hochuanensis (referred)
                - - Mamenchisaurus sinocanadorum
                  - Xinjiangtitan shanshanensis
            - - Mamenchisaurus constructus
              - Mamenchisaurus youngi
              - - Analong chuanjieensis
                - Mamenchisaurus hochuanensis (holotype)
                - - Klamelisaurus gobiensis
                  - Phu Dan Ma taxon
