= Daanosaurus =

Daanosaurus Temporal range: Late Jurassic, 163–145 Ma

Scientific classification
- Kingdom: Animalia
- Phylum: Chordata
- Class: Reptilia
- Clade: Dinosauria
- Clade: Saurischia
- Clade: †Sauropodomorpha
- Clade: †Sauropoda
- Clade: †Eusauropoda
- Genus: †Daanosaurus; Ye, Gao, & Jiang, 2005

Type species
- †Daanosaurus zhangi Ye, Gao, & Jiang, 2005

Extinct genus of dinosaurs

Daanosaurus (meaning "Da'an lizard" after Da'an district in Zigong, Sichuan) was a genus of sauropod dinosaur which lived during the Late Jurassic (Oxfordian - Tithonian stage, about 163 - 145 mya). It lived in what is now China (Sichuan Province), and was similar to Bellusaurus. Daanosaurus is known only from a partial skeleton of a juvenile, and it has been debated whether the specimen may be a juvenile mamenchisaurid.

== Discovery and naming ==
The type species from the Upper Shaximiao Formation was described in 2005 as Daanosaurus zhangi. The genus name refers to Da'an, the district of Zigong where the specimens were found, while the species name honors Zhang Aiping, the former Minister of National Defense. Adult size is unknown due to a lack of fossil remains. The holotype (ZDM 0193), which is the only known specimen, was a juvenile.

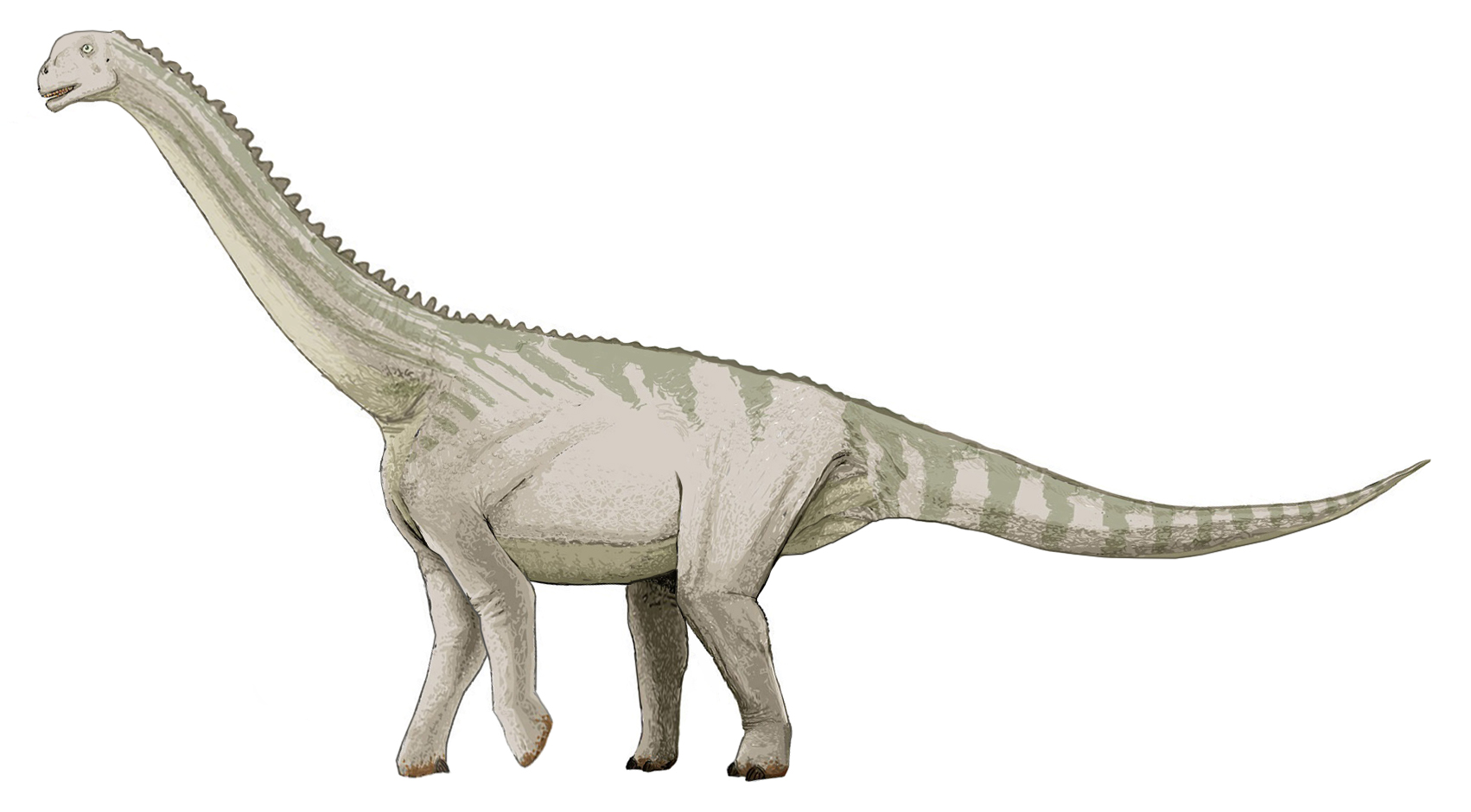
Life restoration of the potentially related Bellusaurus

== Classification ==
When it was described, Daanosaurus was placed in the Bellusaurinae, a sub-family of Brachiosauridae that Dong Zhiming had raised in 1990 to house Bellusaurus. Bellusaurinae was included in Brachiosauridae based on a historical classification in which Brachiosauridae was used as a catch-all for broad-toothed sauropods, rather than implying close affinities with Brachiosaurus in particular. However, this classification is primarily based on the similarity in size with Bellusaurus. Furthermore, in its original description, Daanosaurus was found not to display any characteristics of the Brachiosauridae. More recently, Daanosaurus was placed in the Macronaria due to its opisthocoelous posterior dorsal vertebrae, but this trait is also present in mamenchisaurids.

Ye and colleagues considered the possibility that Daanosaurus zhangi was based on juvenile material of a mamenchisaurid, but ultimately rejected it. In 2023, as part of a redescription of the mamenchisaurid Mamenchisaurus sinocanadorum, the possibility that Daanosaurus was a mamenchisaurid was tested by phylogenetic analysis. When characters that vary through growth were included in the dataset, both Daanosaurus and Bellusaurus were recovered as mamenchisaurids. The authors found that the characters that supported this hypothesis were only found in mamenchisaurids. The results of the analysis are shown below:

- Mamenchisauridae
  - Tienshanosaurus
  - - Omeisaurus junghsiensis
    - - Wamweracaudia
      - - Qijianglong
        - - Mamenchisaurus constructus
          - Bellusaurus
          - - - Rhomaleopakhus
              - - Chuanjiesaurus
                - Analong
            - - Mamenchisaurus youngi
              - - - Mamenchisaurus hochuanensis (holotype)
                  - - Shishugou cervicodorsals
                    - - Phu Kradung taxon
                      - Klamelisaurus
                - - - Mamenchisaurus sinocanadorum
                    - Xinjiangtitan
                  - - Hudiesaurus
                    - - Daanosaurus
                      - Mamenchisaurus hochuanensis (referred)

The authors of the study also acknowledged the possibility that Daanosaurus and Bellusaurus may be members of an early-branching group of the Diplodocoidea that shared unique features with mamenchisaurids. Their status as juveniles, the authors noted, was probably the reason to the uncertainty in their phylogenetic position.
