= Rhomaleopakhus =

Rhomaleopakhus Temporal range: Late Jurassic, 145 Ma

Scientific classification
- Kingdom: Animalia
- Phylum: Chordata
- Class: Reptilia
- Clade: Dinosauria
- Clade: Saurischia
- Clade: †Sauropodomorpha
- Clade: †Sauropoda
- Family: †Mamenchisauridae
- Genus: †Rhomaleopakhus; Upchurch et al., 2021
- Species: †R. turpanensis

Binomial name
- †Rhomaleopakhus turpanensis Upchurch et al., 2021

Sauropod dinosaur

Rhomaleopakhus (meaning "strong forearm") is a genus of mamenchisaurid sauropod dinosaur from the Late Jurassic Kalaza Formation of China. The type and only species is Rhomaleopakhus turpanensis.

== Discovery and naming ==
The Rhomaleopakhus holotype specimen, IVPP-V11121-1, was found by a Chinese-Japanese Chunichi Shinibun expedition near Qiketai in Shanshan, Xinjiang province in 1993. It consists of a partial forelimb, comprising a humerus, ulna, radius, one carpal, and a partial manus. These bones were originally assigned to the coeval mamenchisaurid Hudiesaurus, which was found nearby. In 2004, Paul Upchurch rejected this identity because of a lack of overlapping material.

In a 2021 reassessment of Hudiesaurus published by Upchurch and colleagues, the forelimb material was formally separated from this taxon and described as a new genus and species of mamenchisaurids, named Rhomaleopakhus turpanensis. The generic name combines the Greek rhomaleos, meaning "robust" and "pakhus, meaning "forearm". The specific name refers to the Turpan Basin where the specimen was collected.

== Description ==
Being a mamenchisaurid sauropod, Rhomaleopakhus was likely a large, quadrupedal herbivore. The closely related Mamenchisaurus has been suggested to have been a low or medium browser with a horizontal neck posture.

Upchurch et al. (2021) noted that the robustness of the forelimb, after which the taxon was named, convergently evolved in what are called the "core Mamenchisaurus-like taxa" (CMTs), titanosaurs, and ceratopsids. They believe this correlates with a more flexed orientation of the forearm, an enhanced role of the forearm in feeding, and a more anterior shift in the center of mass. It is possible that CMTs and titanosaurs specialized in a feeding strategy that involved efficient locomotion between sparsely located food sources.

== Classification ==
Upchurch et al. (2021) used the dataset of Moore et al. (2020) to determine the phylogenetic relationships of Rhomaleopakhus. They found it to be a mamenchisaurid as the sister taxon to Chuanjiesaurus, in a clade that also includes Analong. Their results are displayed in the cladogram below:

- Mamenchisauridae
  - Tienshanosaurus
  - - Omeisaurus junghsiensis
    - - Wamweracaudia
      - - - "Mamenchisaurus" sinocanadorum
          - Qijianglong
        - - - Analong
            - - Chuanjiesaurus
              - Rhomaleopakhus
          - - Hudiesaurus
            - "Mamenchisaurus" hochuanensis (referred)
            - "Mamenchisaurus" youngi
            - Xinjiangtitan
            - - "Mamenchisaurus" hochuanensis (holotype)
              - - Shishugou cervicodorsals
                - - Klamelisaurus
                  - Phu Kradung taxon

== Paleoecology ==
Rhomaleopakhus is known from the lower section of the Kalaza Formation in China, one of several fossiliferous formations in the Turpan Basin and Junggar Basin. The Kalaza Formation is Late Jurassic in age, overlying the Middle Jurassic-aged Qigu and Shishugou Formations and underlying the Early Cretaceous-aged Tugulu Group. The Kalaza Formation itself is composed of thick red sandstones in mudstones deposited in terrestrial or fluvial environments. It was warm and seasonally dry, though towards the Cretaceous it transitioned to arid or semi-arid, during the Late Jurassic, with alluvial deltas running through the area. Although suggested to be from the Qigu Formation, The Rhomaleopakhus holotype is definitively known from the Kalaza Formation.

Other dinosaurs known from this formation include the mamenchisaurid Hudiesaurus, the dubious sauropod Chiayusaurus, an indeterminate megalosaurid theropod, and the dubious theropod Szechuanosaurus.
