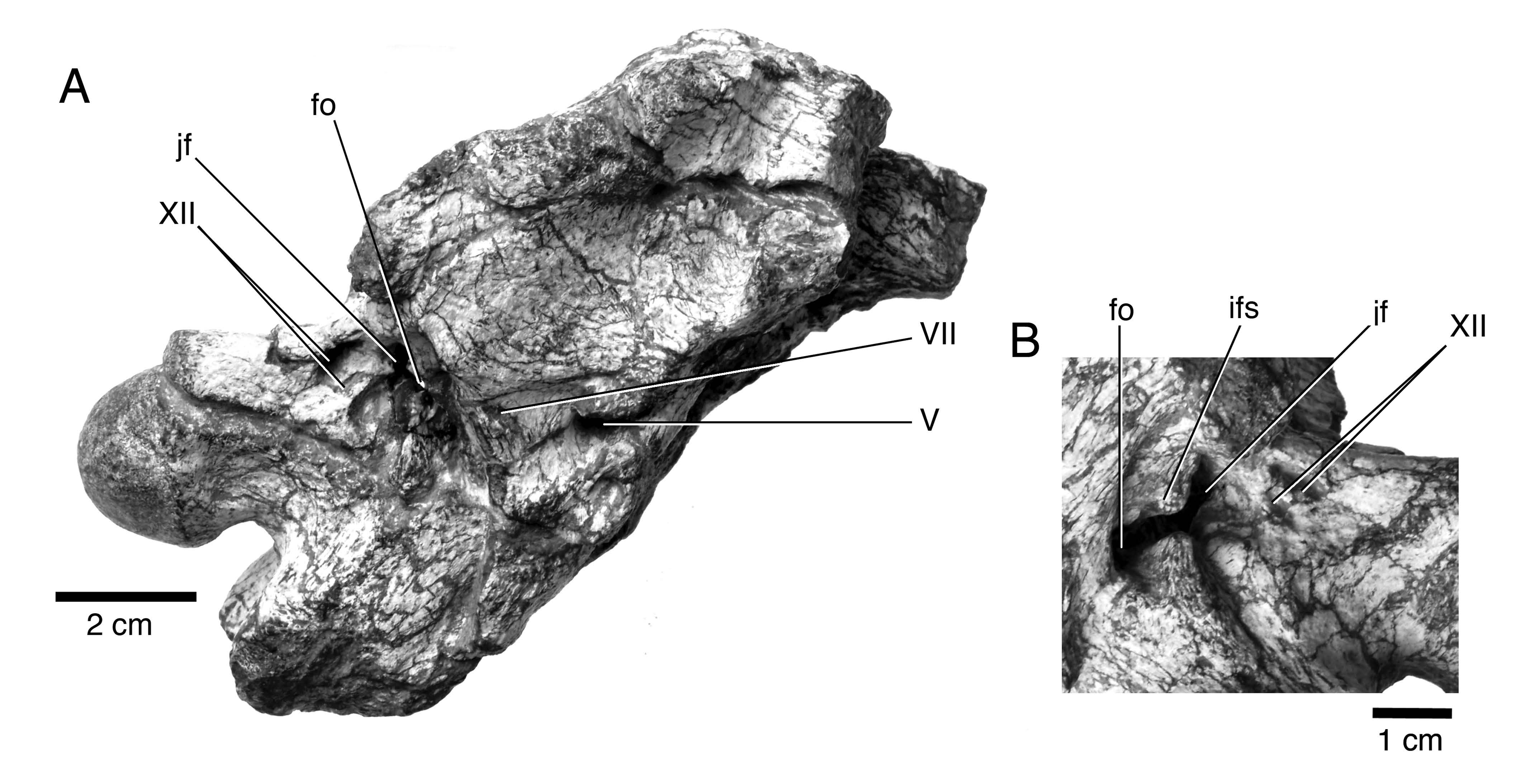
- Holotype

Scientific classification
- Domain: Eukaryota
- Kingdom: Animalia
- Phylum: Chordata
- Clade: Dinosauria
- Clade: Saurischia
- Clade: †Sauropodomorpha
- Clade: †Sauropoda
- Clade: †Eusauropoda
- Genus: †Nebulasaurus; Xing et al., 2015

Type species
- †Nebulasaurus taito Xing et al., 2015

= Nebulasaurus =

Nebulasaurus Temporal range: Middle Jurassic, 174.1–168.3 Ma

Extinct genus of dinosaurs

Nebulasaurus is an extinct genus of basal eusauropod dinosaur known from the early Middle Jurassic Zhanghe Formation (Aalenian or Bajocian stage) of Yunnan Province, China. It is known only from the holotype braincase LDRC-v.d.1. A phylogenetic analysis found Nebulasaurus to be a sister taxon to Spinophorosaurus from the Middle Jurassic of Africa. This discovery is significant paleontologically because it represents a clade of basal eusauropods previously unknown from Asia.

== Etymology ==
The genus name Nebulasaurus, means "misty cloud lizard", and is derived from the Latin word nebulae meaning "misty cloud", a reference to "Yunnan" which means "southern misty cloudy province" and the Greek word "sauros" (σαυρος) meaning "lizard" The specific name ‘’taito’’, was given in honor of Japanese company Taito, which funded the field project and is geographically near the discovery site. Nebulasaurus was described and named by Lida Xing, Tetsuto Miyashita, Philip J. Currie, Hailu You, and Zhiming Dong in 2015 and the type species is Nebulasaurus taito. Nebulasaurus was one of eighteen dinosaur taxa from 2015 to be described in open access or free-to-read journals.

== Description ==
The only fossil material recovered was a braincase, which was in a good state of preservation.

== Classification ==
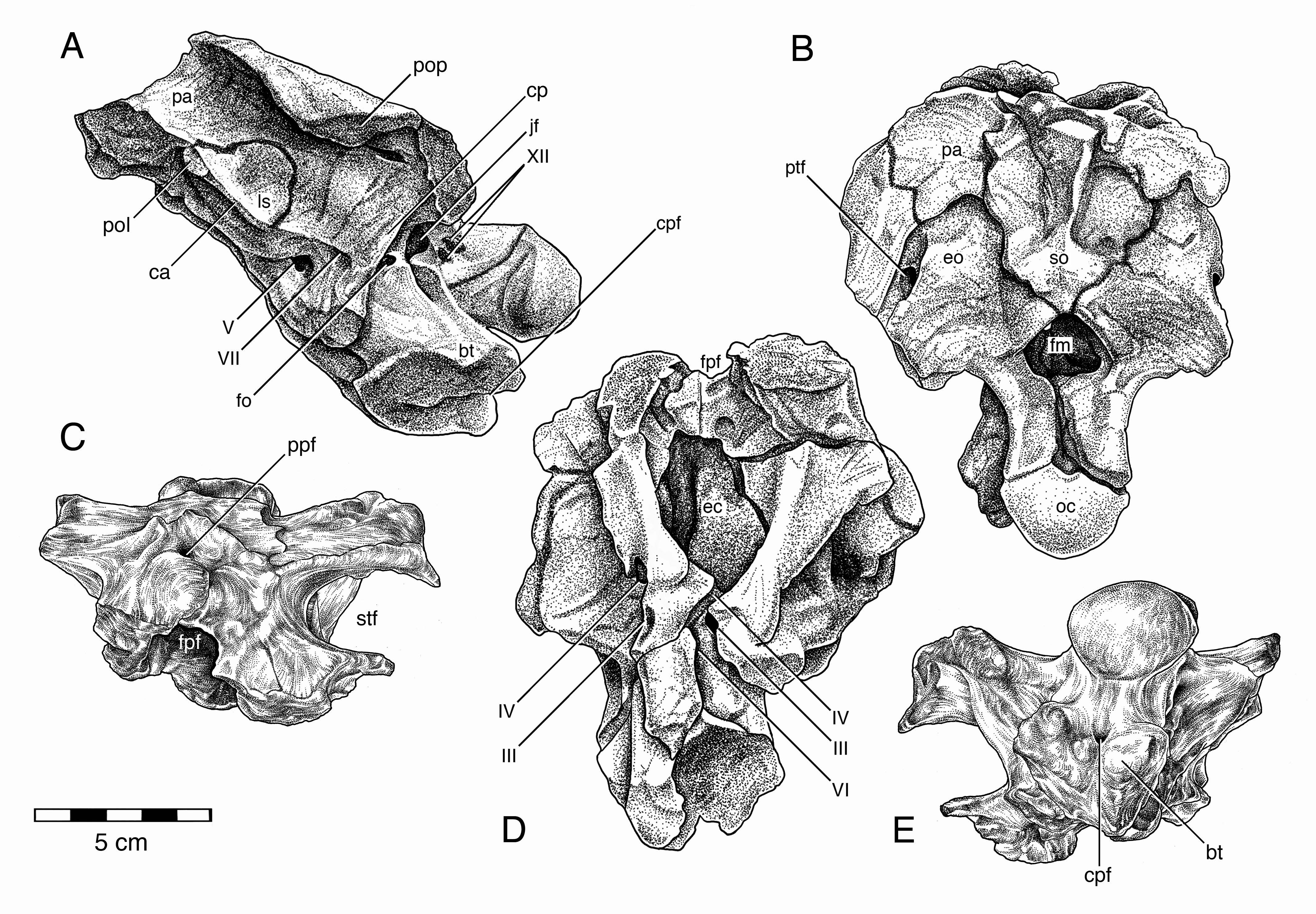
Interpretive drawings of the holotype

Nebulasaurus was classified as a basal eusauropod, however its braincase bears resemblance to those of more derived neosauropods. Phylogenetic analysis showed that Nebulasaurus was most closely related to Spinophorosaurus. When compared to coeval sauropods, the discovery of Nebulasaurus demonstrates the diversity of sauropodomorph fauna in China during the Jurassic period.

=== Distinguishing anatomical features ===
A diagnosis is a statement of the anatomical features of an organism (or group) that collectively distinguish it from all other organisms. Some, but not all, of the features in a diagnosis are also autapomorphies. An autapomorphy is a distinctive anatomical feature that is unique to a given organism or group.

According to Xing et al. (2015), Nebulasaurus can be distinguished based on the following characteristics:

- the exoccipitals are nearly excluding the supraoccipital from the foramen magnum (supraoccipital forms less than a tenth of the margin of the foramen magnum)
- the supraoccipital is not expanded laterally between the parietal bone and the exoccipital.
- the crista interfenestralis is incompletely partitioning the fenestra ovalis and the jugular foramen (Note: This condition is also present in some neosauropods, but not present in Mamenchisaurus, Omeisaurus, Shunosaurus, and Spinophorosaurus, all of which are observed with a fully formed crista interfenestralis)
- the frontoparietal fenestra is located at the frontal-parietal suture and is larger than postparietal foramen (Note: This condition is absent from mamenchisaurids, which are observed to have both fenestrae absent altogether)
- the craniopharyngeal foramen is posterior to the basal tubera (Note: A condition distinguishing it from Spinophorosaurus, where the foramen is anterior to the basal tubera)

== Paleoecology ==
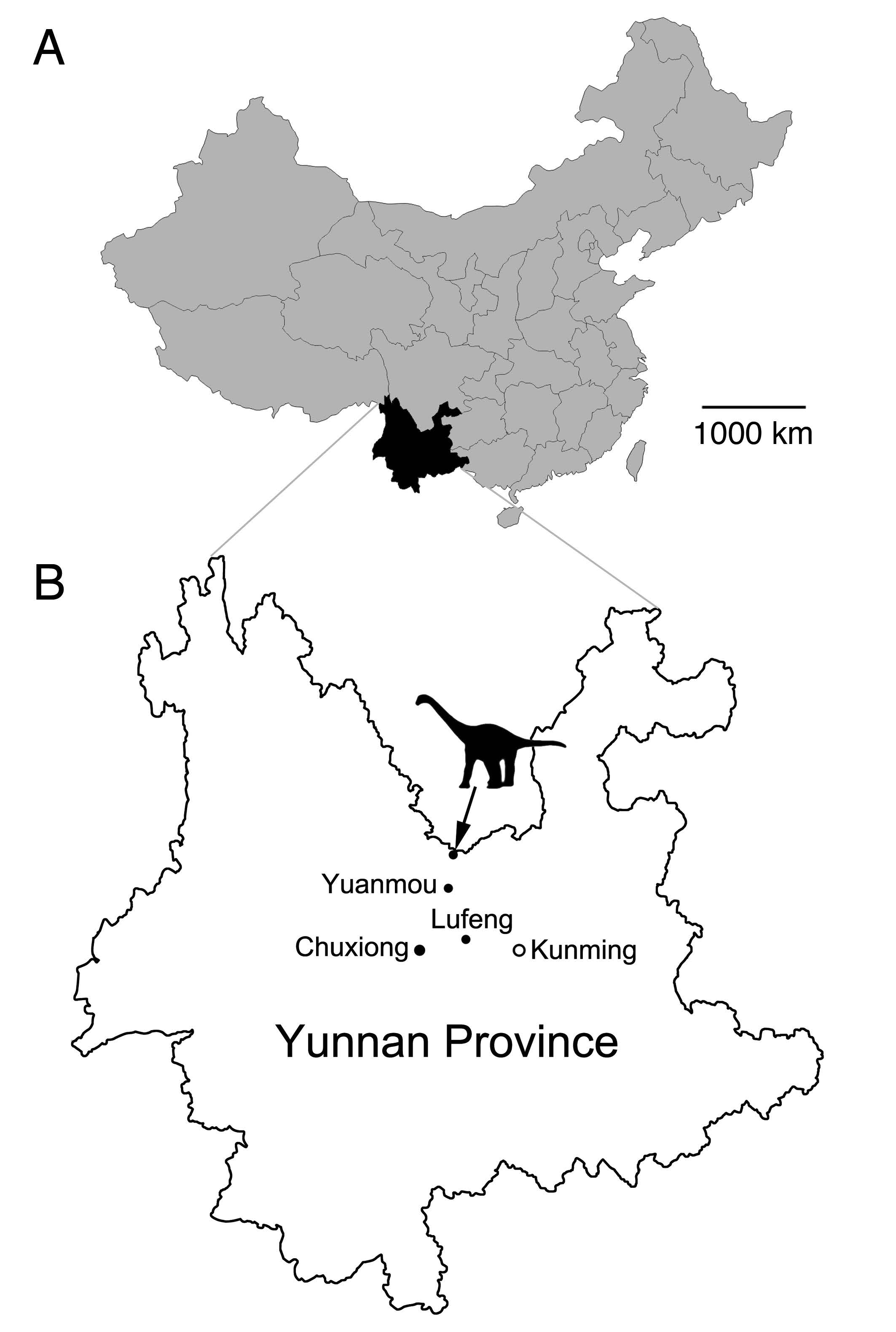
Map showing where the holotype was discovered

=== Provenance and occurrence ===
The holotype specimen of Nebulasaurus taito LDRC-v.d.1 was recovered from the Zhanghe Formation, near Xiabanjing, in Yuanmou County of Yunnan Province, China. The specimen was collected in terrestrial sediments deposited during the Aalenian and Bajocian stages of the Jurassic period, approximately 174 to 168 million years ago. This specimen is housed in the Lufeng Dinosaur Research Center in Yunnan Province.

=== Fauna and habitat ===
The Zhanghe Formation has produced the remains yielded one basal sauropodomorph Yunnanosaurus youngi, and two basal eusauropods Eomamenchisaurus yuanmouensis and Yuanmousaurus jiangyiensis. This diverse sauropodomorph faunal collection from the Middle Jurassic of Asia preceded the mamenchisaurid dominance that is observed in East Asia during the Late Jurassic.
