= Fushanosaurus =

Fushanosaurus Temporal range: Late Jurassic, ~161–156 Ma

Scientific classification
- Kingdom: Animalia
- Phylum: Chordata
- Class: Reptilia
- Clade: Dinosauria
- Clade: Saurischia
- Clade: †Sauropodomorpha
- Clade: †Sauropoda
- Clade: †Eusauropoda
- Genus: †Fushanosaurus; Wang et al., 2019

Type species
- †Fushanosaurus qitaiensis Wang et al., 2019

Genus of titanosauriform dinosaur from the Late Jurassic period

Fushanosaurus (Chinese: 傅山龙; pinyin: Fùshānlóng; meaning "Fushan lizard", after the Fushan Museum where its remains are stored) is a genus of sauropod dinosaur from the Shishugou Formation from Xinjiang Province in China. The type and only species is Fushanosaurus qitaiensis (Chinese: 奇台傅山龙; pinyin: Qítái Fùshānlóng). It is solely known from the holotype specimen FH000101, a complete right femur.

The holotype femur of F. qitaiensis is 180 centimetres (5.9 ft) long. By comparison to two other giant sauropods from Asia, Ruyangosaurus and Daxiatitan, Fushanosaurus was estimated to have been approximately 30 metres (98 ft) long, which would then make it one of the longest known dinosaurs.

Fushanosaurus was originally described as a titanosauriform, but the features initially believed to indicate titanosauriform affinities are actually more widespread among sauropods, and Fushanosaurus may be a mamenchisaurid, the only group of sauropods definitely known to be present in the Shishugou Formation.
