= Yuanmousaurus =

Yuanmousaurus Temporal range: Middle Jurassic
- Size

Scientific classification
- Kingdom: Animalia
- Phylum: Chordata
- Class: Reptilia
- Clade: Dinosauria
- Clade: Saurischia
- Clade: †Sauropodomorpha
- Clade: †Sauropoda
- Family: †Mamenchisauridae
- Genus: †Yuanmousaurus; Lü et al., 2006
- Species: †Y. jiangyiensis

Binomial name
- †Yuanmousaurus jiangyiensis Lü et al., 2006

Extinct genus of dinosaurs

Yuanmousaurus ("Yuanmou lizard") was a sauropod dinosaur from the Middle Jurassic period of China. It is known from incomplete remains, recovered in 2000 from the Zhanghe Formation in Yuanmou County in Yunnan Province. Yuanmousaurus was a relatively large sauropod and may have reached about 17 meters (56 ft) in length. It was a basal member of the Sauropoda, but its exact systematic position is unclear. A recent study placed Yuanmousaurus within the family Mamenchisauridae. It may be a dubious genus. The only and type species was Yuanmousaurus jiangyiensis.

== Description ==
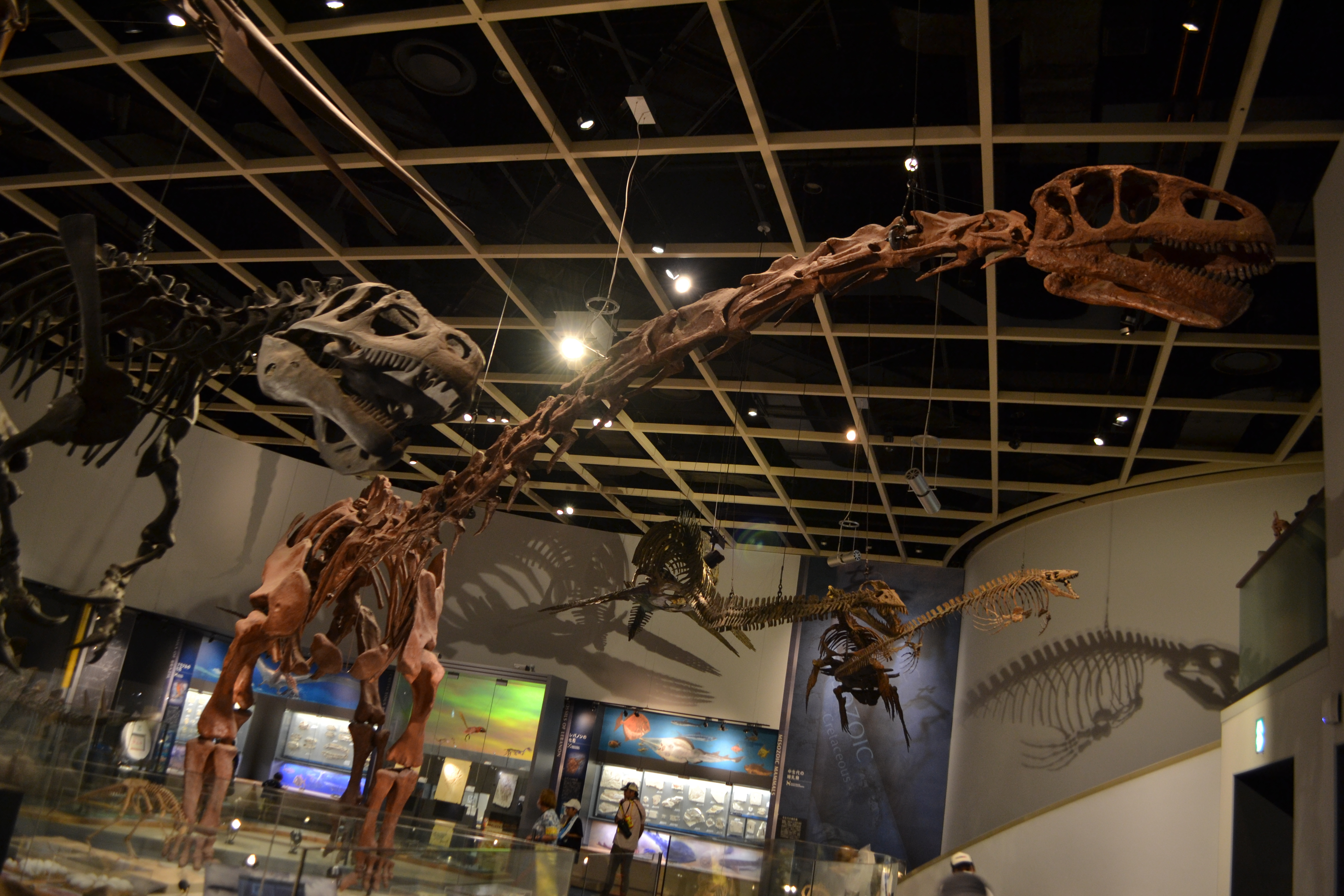
A skeletal mount in Toyohashi Museum of Natural History

Yuanmousaurus was estimated to be approximately 17 meters (56 ft) in length. The skull is missing, while the neck is known only from a fragment of a posterior cervical vertebra. This fragment indicates elongated neck vertebrae, similar to those of mamenchisaurid sauropods, but unlike the much shorter neck vertebrae of the more basal Shunosaurus. From the trunk and tail, nine dorsal, three sacral and seven caudal vertebrae were found. While the shoulder and pelvic girdles are missing with the exception of one ilium, the limbs are better known, including the humerus, ulna, radius, thigh bone, tibia, fibula, astragalus, and a claw from the hind foot. The forelimbs were proportionally longer than in the shortnecked Shunosaurus, but shorter than in Omeisaurus: the length ratio between humerus and thigh bone was 0.72 in Yuanmousaurus, while it was 0.56 in Shunosaurus and 0.80 in Omeisaurus.

== Discovery ==
The only known specimen, YMV 601, was collected in May 2000 in the village Jiangyi in Yuanmou County, Yunnan Province. The fossils are now housed in the Yuanmou Museum. They were described as belonging to a new genus and species, named Yuanmousaurus jiangyiensis, by Lü Junchang and colleagues in 2006. The name references its discovery in Yuanmou County and the village Jiangyi, where the fossils were found.

== Classification ==
Yuanmousaurus is deemed to be a basal member of the Eusauropoda, standing outside the Neosauropoda, which comprises all more derived sauropods. In its species description, Lü Junchang and colleagues considered Yuanmousaurus a member of the Euhelopodidae that was closely related to Patagosaurus, more basal than Euhelopus, and more derived than Omeisaurus. The Euhelopodidae, however, is abandoned by many palaeontologists since the systematic position of Euhelopus itself is controversial. A newer analysis by Toru Sekiya places Yuanmousaurus within the Mamenchisauridae, together with Mamenchisaurus, Tienshanosaurus and Chuanjiesaurus. In 2013, a study describing the sauropod Nebulasaurus, also from the Zhanghe Formation, evaluated the characters distinguishing Yuanmousaurus and considered them invalid, since they were present in other sauropod taxa.

== Palaeobiography ==
TBA
