= Kalaza Formation =

Geological formation in Xinjiang, China

- Stratigraphic range: Late Kimmeridgian, 155.3–152.1 Ma
- Type: Geological formation
- Underlies: Tugulu Group
- Overlies: Qigu Formation, Shishugou Formation

Location
- Country: China
- Extent: Junggar Basin, Turpan Basin (equivalent unit)

The Kalaza Formation is a geological formation in Xinjiang, China whose strata date back to the Late Jurassic. There is some confusion with the stratigraphy of this unit, as the term is used for sediments of equivalent age in both the Junggar Basin and the Turpan Basin. Dinosaur remains are among the fossils that have been recovered from formation.

== Vertebrate paleofauna ==
Dinosaurs of the Kalazha Formation
Genus	Species	Presence	Notes	Images
Hudiesaurus	H. sinojapanorum	Turpan Basin	Posterior cervical vertebra	
cf. Szechuanosaurus	cf. S. campi	Geographically located in Xinjiang Uygur Zizhiqu, China.	Later found to be indeterminate theropod remains.	
Rhomaleopakhus	R. turpanensis	Turpan Basin	Right forelimb	

== See also ==
- List of dinosaur-bearing rock formations
