= Eomamenchisaurus =

Eomamenchisaurus Temporal range: Middle Jurassic, 174.1–161.2 Ma

Scientific classification
- Kingdom: Animalia
- Phylum: Chordata
- Class: Reptilia
- Clade: Dinosauria
- Clade: Saurischia
- Clade: †Sauropodomorpha
- Clade: †Sauropoda
- Family: †Mamenchisauridae
- Genus: †Eomamenchisaurus; Lü et al., 2008
- Species: †E. yuanmouensis

Binomial name
- †Eomamenchisaurus yuanmouensis Lü et al., 2008

Extinct genus of dinosaurs

Eomamenchisaurus (meaning "dawn Mamenchisaurus") is a genus of mamenchisaurid sauropod dinosaur from the Middle Jurassic Zhanghe Formation of Yuanmou, Yunnan, China. The type species is E. yuanmouensis, described by Lü Junchang and colleagues in 2008.

== Discovery and naming ==
Eomamenchisaurus yuanmouensis was named by Lü Junchang, Li Tianguang, Zhong Shimin, Ji Qiang, and Li Shaoxue in 2008 based on a partial skeleton found in Jiangyi Township of Yuanmou County, Yunnan. The genus name is derived from Greek ἠώς, "dawn" and the name of the related genus Mamenchisaurus, referring to its status as an early mamenchisaurid, and the species name refers to its discovery in Yuanmou.

== Fossil record ==
Eomamenchisaurus yuanmouensis is only known from a single partial skeleton, the holotype CXMVZA 165, which includes incomplete cervical vertebrae, dorsal vertebrae, a partial sacrum consisting of three preserved vertebrae, the right ilium, pubis, and tibia, and both femora and ischia. The specimen was collected from the Zhanghe Formation, which dates to the Middle Jurassic. The specimen is stored in the Chuxiong Museum.

== Description ==
Eomamenchisaurus was a mamenchisaurid, a group of sauropods typically characterized by a very long neck. However, in several respects, Eomamenchisaurus shows more primitive characteristics than other mamenchisaurids. Like some other mamenchisaurids, the posterior dorsal vertebrae are fused together. The dorsal vertebrae are unlike more derived mamenchisaurids in having only weakly convex anterior faces. The sacrum was probably composed of four vertebrae, as the first preserved sacral vertebra shows a missing sacral vertebra would have attached in front. The femur is 1.1 metres (3.6 ft) long, similar in length to the 1.16 metres (3.8 ft) long femur of the 16 metres (52 ft) long Mamenchisaurus youngi. The fourth trochanter, a ridge on the femur for muscle attachment, is located on the medial margin of the shaft, as in most early sauropods, rather than being on the midline of the shaft as in Mamenchisaurus. The length of the tibia is approximately 64% of the length of the femur.

== Classification ==
Lü and colleagues, in their original description of Eomamenchisaurus, classified it as a mamenchisaurid. In 2015, Xing Lida and colleagues noted that Eomamenchisaurus was difficult to distinguish from Yuanmousaurus, another mamenchisaurid from the Zhanghe Formation.
