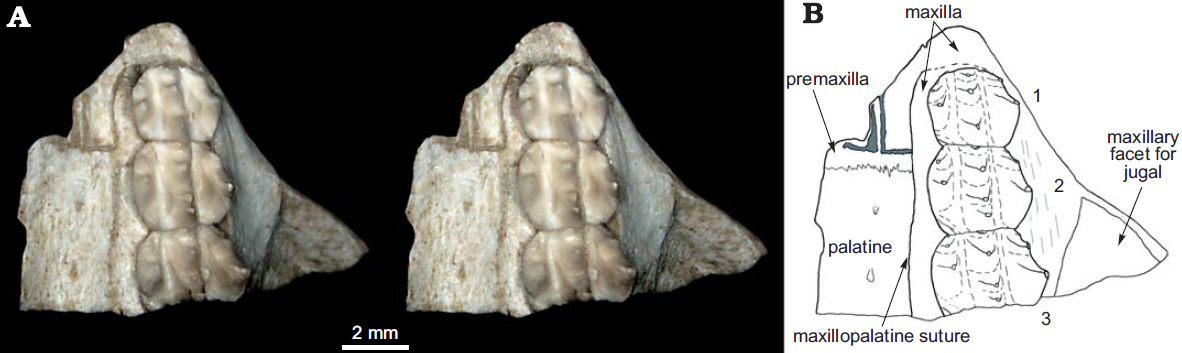
- Holotype upper jaw fragment

Scientific classification
- Kingdom: Animalia
- Phylum: Chordata
- Clade: Synapsida
- Clade: Therapsida
- Clade: Cynodontia
- Family: †Tritylodontidae
- Genus: †Yuanotherium; Hu, Meng & Clark, 2009
- Species: †Y. minor

Binomial name
- †Yuanotherium minor Hu, Meng & Clark, 2009

= Yuanotherium =

Yuanotherium Temporal range: Oxfordian

Extinct genus of mammaliamorphs

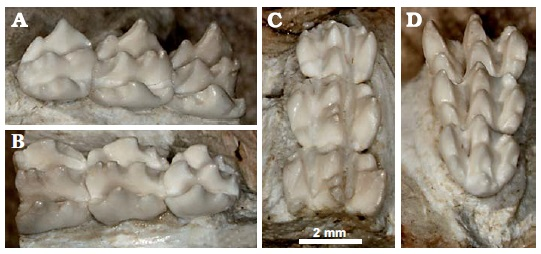
Holotype teeth

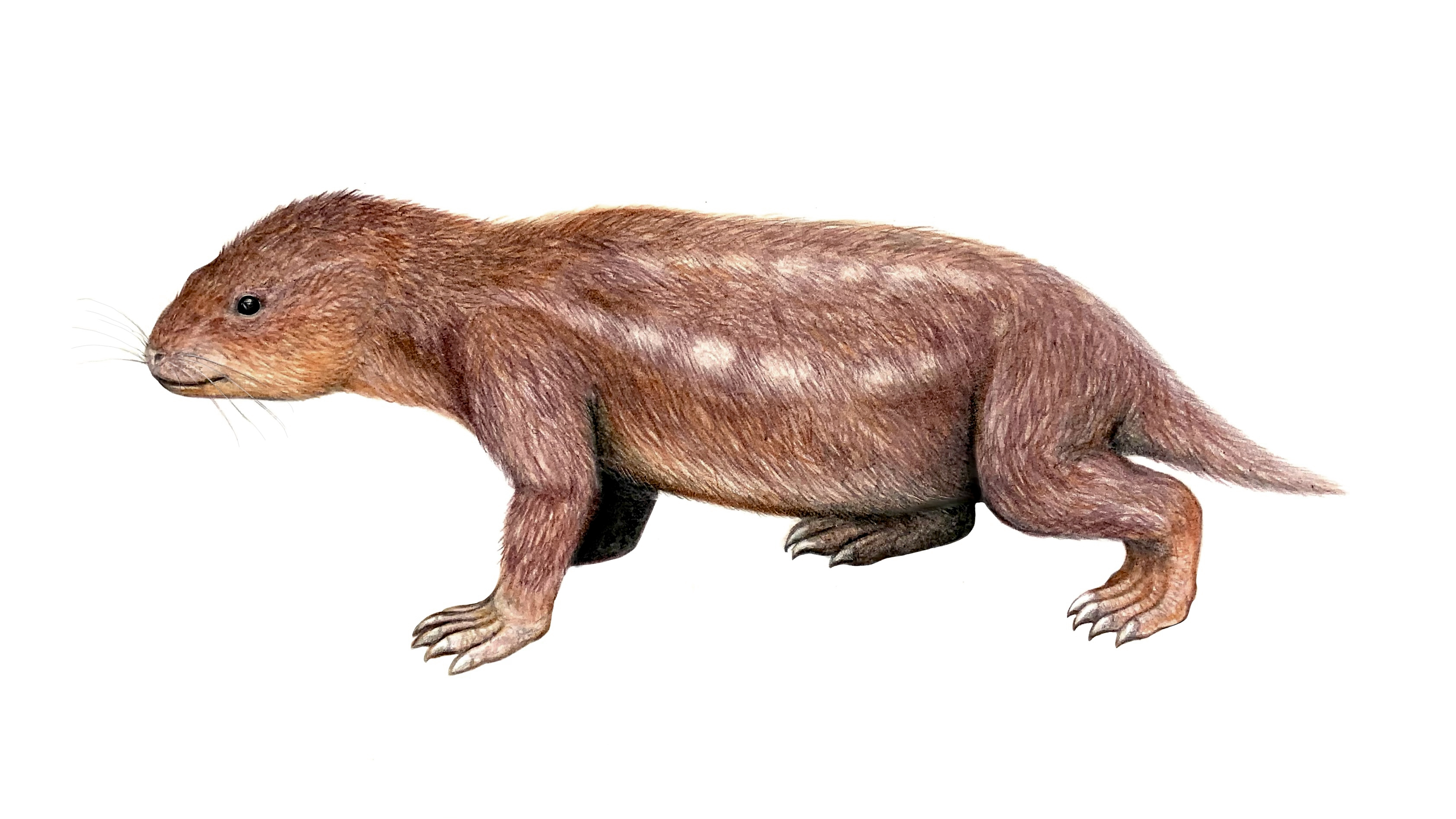
Life restoration

Yuanotherium minor is an extinct species of tritylodontid cynodonts which existed in China during the Late Jurassic epoch, described from the Shishugou Formation. It is the only species in the monotypic genus Yuanotherium.

== Description ==
Y. minor is charactersed by a reduced maxilla, a trait unique not just among tritylodontids but among cynodonts at large. It also had an exceptionally large lacrimal.

== Palaeobiology ==
=== Palaeoecology ===
Y. minor is suggested to have been an omnivore rather than a herbivore.
