= Shishugou Formation =

Geologic formation in China

- Stratigraphic range: Callovian-Oxfordian; ~163–156 Ma
- Type: Geological formation
- Unit of: Qigu Group
- Sub-units: Wucaiwan Member
- Underlies: Kalaza Formation
- Overlies: Xishanyao Formation
- Thickness: 380 m (1,250 ft)

Lithology
- Primary: Mudstone
- Other: Tuff, sandstone, conglomerate

Location
- Coordinates: 44.5°N 90.2°E
- Approximate paleocoordinates: 42.5°N 100.5°E
- Region: Xinjiang
- Country: China
- Extent: Northern Junggar Basin
- Shishugou Formation (China) Shishugou Formation (Xinjiang)

The Shishugou Formation (simplified Chinese: 石树沟组; traditional Chinese: 石樹溝組; pinyin: Shíshùgōu Zǔ) is a geological formation in Xinjiang, China.

Its strata date back to the Late Jurassic period. Dinosaur remains are among the fossils that have been recovered from the formation. The Shishugou Formation is considered one of the most phylogenetically and trophically diverse Middle to Late Jurassic theropod fauna.

The Wucaiwan Member, once considered a separate, underlying formation, is now considered the lowest unit of the Shishugou Formation.

== Lithology ==
At the Wuwaican locality, the formation is approximately 380 m thick, the lower 30 metres of the formation predominantly consist of conglomerate, with the majority of the formation consisting of red coloured mudstone with frequent channel/sheet sandstone lenses and occasional tuffaceous deposits. It is laterally equivalent to the Qigu Formation in the southern half of the Junggar Basin.

=== Shishugou Formation dinosaur traps ===
The Shishugou Formation dinosaur traps also known as death pits or death traps are pit structures found within the formation that are noted for their fossil content.

==== Paleontology ====
These 'traps' or 'bonebeds' are unusual in that they consist of vertically stacked skeletons of numerous non-avian theropods in 1–2 metres (3.3–6.6 ft) deep pits. The pits are filled with a mix of alluvial and volcanic mudstone and sandstone and appear to have been created by the trampling and wallowing of large dinosaurs. Small theropods and vertebrates then became mired in these pits, dying and being forced deeper by the activities of the large dinosaurs and the struggles of later victims. The high quality of preservation suggests a rapid burying of the carcasses. Some scavenging of the bodies took place leading to a dispersal of body parts. Smaller vertebrates were prone to getting stuck in these mudholes, and the small ceratosaur, Limusaurus inextricabilis, is the most common in the resulting bonebeds.

Excavations since 2000 have revealed a wealth of fossils dating from a period some 165 to 155 million years ago. Palaeontologists James Clark and Xu Xing are shedding light on this period previously notorious for its paucity of fossils, but important for its massive burst of speciation among the dinosaurs and ancestors of birds. These new branches on the dinosaur family tree led to well-known dinosaur groups, such as the horned ceratopsians, armoured stegosaurs, and tyrannosaurs. Clark joined Xu, from Beijing's Institute of Vertebrate Paleontology and Paleoanthropology, to explore the Junggar Basin, and in particular the Shishugou Formation, where the exposed rocks have been linked to the Middle Jurassic.

==== Prehistoric life ====
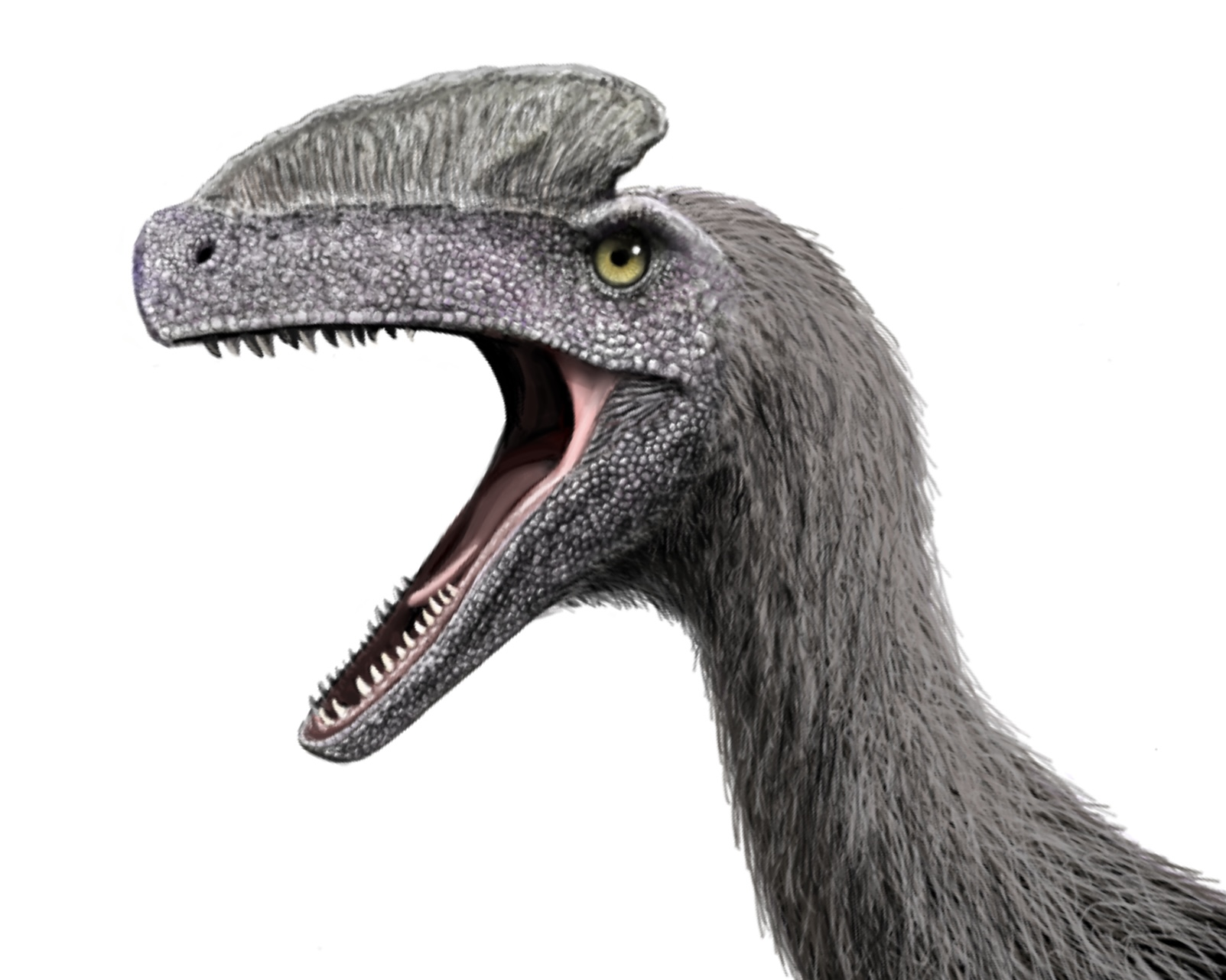
Guanlong wucaii

At the time the area was covered by marshland, adjoined a small mountain range peppered with volcanoes, and was inhabited by dinosaurs, small crocodilians and amphibians. Currently it is a sparsely settled region of dry washes, arid badlands and dunes along the Gobi Desert's western edge. The Shishugou Formation consists of mudstone, siltstone, and sandstone, and is named for the silicified wood or petrified logs found here. ('Shishugou' = 'stone tree valley') These badlands were used for some sequences in the film Crouching Tiger, Hidden Dragon, the genus Yinlong ('hidden dragon') being named for the film.

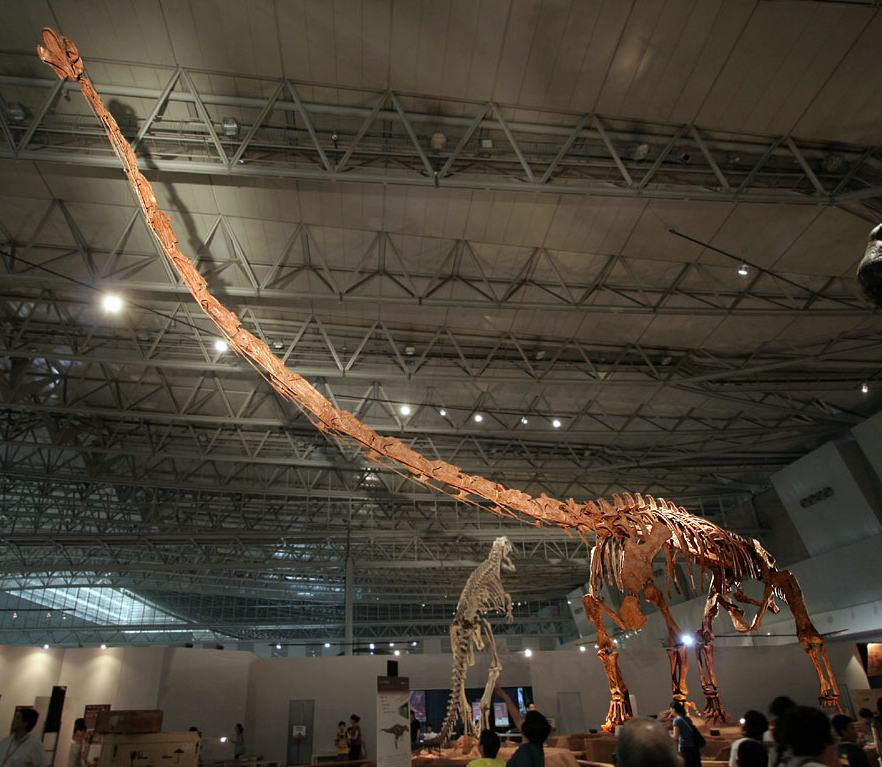
Mamenchisaurus sinocanadorum

When the site was first excavated, new species of turtles, crocodilians, pterosaurs, and early mammals were revealed. Many of these species showed the rudiments of characteristics that would later become their hallmarks. One of the first fossil skeletons exposed proved to be that of an unknown theropod, and revealed a stack of four more theropods buried below the first. Yang Zhongjian accompanied the first expedition to the Junggar Basin in 1928, and the fossils found included the medium-size sauropod Tienshanosaurus chitaiensis. Later expeditions stretched from the 1960s to the 1990s and yielded among others the extremely long-necked Mamenchisaurus and the carnivorous Sinraptor. In all, some 600 specimens have been collected.

On analysis of the rock matrix, large amounts of volcanic ash were found, hinting at eruptions during that period, the ash raining onto the marsh creating viscous mud and becoming subsequent death traps. To date three of these death pits have been located. In one pit a crocodilian was found against a small ceratosaur, in another three decapitated ceratosaurs. The most interesting of the traps gave up the fossil remains of an 80 kg tyrannosauroid named Guanlong, sporting a crest running from its nose to the back of its head. Its discovery was hailed by paleontologists as the earliest known remains of the tyrannosauroid clan that culminated with Tyrannosaurus rex.

== Vertebrate paleofauna ==
=== Dinosaurs ===
==== Ornithischians ====
Undescribed stegosaur is present in the Wucaiwan member. Undescribed ornithopod is present in the Wucaiwan member. Undescribed ankylosaurs present in both upper Shishugou and Wucaiwan members.

Color key: Taxon / Reclassified taxon / Taxon falsely reported as present / Dubious taxon or junior synonym / Ichnotaxon / Ootaxon / Morphotaxon

Notes
Uncertain or tentative taxa are in small text
~~crossed out~~ taxa are discredited.

Genus	Species	Stratigraphic position	Abundance	Notes	Images
"Eugongbusaurus"	"E. wucaiwanensis"	Upper		An unspecified basal ornithopod (or perhaps a more basal neornithischian), previously classified as Gongbusaurus wucaiwanensis. It is estimated at 1.3 to 1.5 meters (4.3 to 4.9 ft) long.	
Hualianceratops	H. wucaiwanensis	Upper		An early ceratopsian.	
Jiangjunosaurus	J. junggarensis	Upper		A stegosaurid reaching around 6 meters (20 feet) in length and weighed 2.5 metric tons. It had three distinguishing traits: the crowns of the teeth are symmetrical and in side view wider than tall; the spine of the axis, the second neck vertebra, has a rectangular profile in side view, instead of a triangular one; and the rear neck vertebrae have large vein openings in their sides.	
Yinlong	Y. downsi	Upper		A very basal and most primitive ceratopsian (possibly a chaoyangsaurid). It was bipedal and had a total length of about 1.2 meters (3.9 feet) from nose to tail, and a weight of about 15 kilograms (33 pounds).	

==== Sauropods ====
Color key: Taxon / Reclassified taxon / Taxon falsely reported as present / Dubious taxon or junior synonym / Ichnotaxon / Ootaxon / Morphotaxon

Notes
Uncertain or tentative taxa are in small text
~~crossed out~~ taxa are discredited.

Sauropods of the Shishugou Formation
Genus	Species	Stratigraphic position	Material	Notes	Images
Bellusaurus	B. sui	base of Upper		A short-necked sauropod only known from juvenile specimens which measured about 4.8 meters (16 feet) long.	Bellusaurus sui Klamelisaurus gobiensis Mamenchisaurus sinocanadorum
Fushanosaurus	F. qitaiensis	Upper	Complete right femur	A titanosauriform estimated to have been approximately 98 feet long, which would then make it one of the longest known dinosaurs.	Bellusaurus sui Klamelisaurus gobiensis Mamenchisaurus sinocanadorum
Klamelisaurus	K. gobiensis	Wucaiwan member		A eusauropod measuring 15 meters and weighing 5 metric tons.	Bellusaurus sui Klamelisaurus gobiensis Mamenchisaurus sinocanadorum
Mamenchisaurus	M. sinocanadorum	Upper	"Partial skull and skeleton."	A mamenchisaurid with a remarkably long neck which made up half the total body length. It is one of the largest dinosaurs known, measuring 35 meters (115 feet) in length with an 18-meter-long (59-foot) neck.	Bellusaurus sui Klamelisaurus gobiensis Mamenchisaurus sinocanadorum
Tienshanosaurus	T. chitaiensis	Upper	"Partial postcranial skeleton."	A mamenchisaurid known from very few remains.	Bellusaurus sui Klamelisaurus gobiensis Mamenchisaurus sinocanadorum

==== Theropods ====
Undescribed ornithomimosaur-like species. Indeterminate tetanuran remains.

Color key: Taxon / Reclassified taxon / Taxon falsely reported as present / Dubious taxon or junior synonym / Ichnotaxon / Ootaxon / Morphotaxon

Notes
Uncertain or tentative taxa are in small text
~~crossed out~~ taxa are discredited.

Genus	Species	Stratigraphic position	Abundance	Notes	Images
Aorun	A. zhaoi	Wucaiwan member		A basal alvarezsaur that was at best 1 meter (3.3 feet) long and weighed 2 kilograms (4.4 pounds) at most.	
Guanlong	G. wucaii	Upper		A proceratosaurid that was one of the earliest tyrannosaurs, about 3 meters (9.8 feet). It has a large distinctive crest on its head, a feature seen in many primitive tyrannosaurs	
Haplocheirus	H. sollers	Upper		An alvarezsaur that was the largest known definite member of the superfamily, at around 2 meters long. It had an enlarged thumb claw like other alvarezsaurs, but also retained two other functional fingers, unlike more derived alvarezsaurs, where only the thumb was significantly large and clawed.	
Limusaurus	L. inextricabilis	Upper		A toothless, omnivorous elaphrosaurine noasaur that is the first definitely known Jurassic ceratosaur from Eastern Asia, including China. Limusaurus had a small slender body measuring about 1.7 meters in length.	
Monolophosaurus	M. jiangi	Wucaiwan member Upper?		A tetanuran named for the single crest on top of its skull. It is estimated to have a length at 5.5 meters (18 feet), the weight at 475 kilograms. Teeth possibly referable to this genus known from the upper part of the formation.	
Shishugounykus	S. inexpectus	Upper		A little-known early alvarezsaur.	
Sinraptor	S. dongi	Upper		A metriacanthosaurine metriacanthosaur theropod standing nearly 3 meters (9.8 feet) tall and measuring roughly 7.6 meters (25 feet) in length.	
Zuolong	Z. salleei	Upper		A basal tyrannoraptoran approximately 3 meters (9.8 feet) long and weighs about equal to a gray wolf. The specimen known is probably from a juvenile individual and is quite complete.	
Metriacanthosauridae Indet.	Indeterminate	Upper		A giant metriacanthosaurid, possibly Yangchuanosaurus or Sinraptor.	

=== Crocodylomorphs ===
Color key: Taxon / Reclassified taxon / Taxon falsely reported as present / Dubious taxon or junior synonym / Ichnotaxon / Ootaxon / Morphotaxon

Notes
Uncertain or tentative taxa are in small text
~~crossed out~~ taxa are discredited. After an overview of crocodylomorphs of the Junggar Basin, Wings et al. identified the following species from the Shishugou Formation.

Genus	Species	Stratigraphic position	Abundance	Notes	Images
Crocodyliformes indet.		Upper	A single fully articulated skeleton	Found on the same slab that also preserved the holotype and an associated specimen of Limusaurus inextricabilis	
Junggarsuchus	J. sloani	Upper		A sphenosuchian crocodylomorph	
Sunosuchus	S. junggarensis	Upper		A Goniopholidid	
Nominosuchus	N. matutinus	Upper		Shartegosuchid	

=== Mammaliamorphs ===
Color key: Taxon / Reclassified taxon / Taxon falsely reported as present / Dubious taxon or junior synonym / Ichnotaxon / Ootaxon / Morphotaxon

Notes
Uncertain or tentative taxa are in small text
~~crossed out~~ taxa are discredited.

Genus	Species	Stratigraphic position	Abundance	Notes	Images
Bienotheroides	B. wucaiensis	Upper		A tritylodontid cynodont	Yuanotherium
Yuanotherium	Y. minor	Upper	An upper jaw fragment	A tritylodontid cynodont	Yuanotherium

=== Pterosaurs ===
Color key: Taxon / Reclassified taxon / Taxon falsely reported as present / Dubious taxon or junior synonym / Ichnotaxon / Ootaxon / Morphotaxon

Notes
Uncertain or tentative taxa are in small text
~~crossed out~~ taxa are discredited.

Genus	Species	Stratigraphic position	Abundance	Notes	Images
Kryptodrakon	K. progenitor	Upper		A basal pterodactyloid with an estimated wingspan of 1.47 meters (4.8 feet).	
Sericipterus	S. wucaiwanensis	Upper		A rhamphorhynchine rhamphorhynchid with a wingspan that has been estimated at least 1.73 meters.	

== See also ==
- Jurassic Asia
- Jurassic paleontological sites
- List of dinosaur-bearing rock formations
