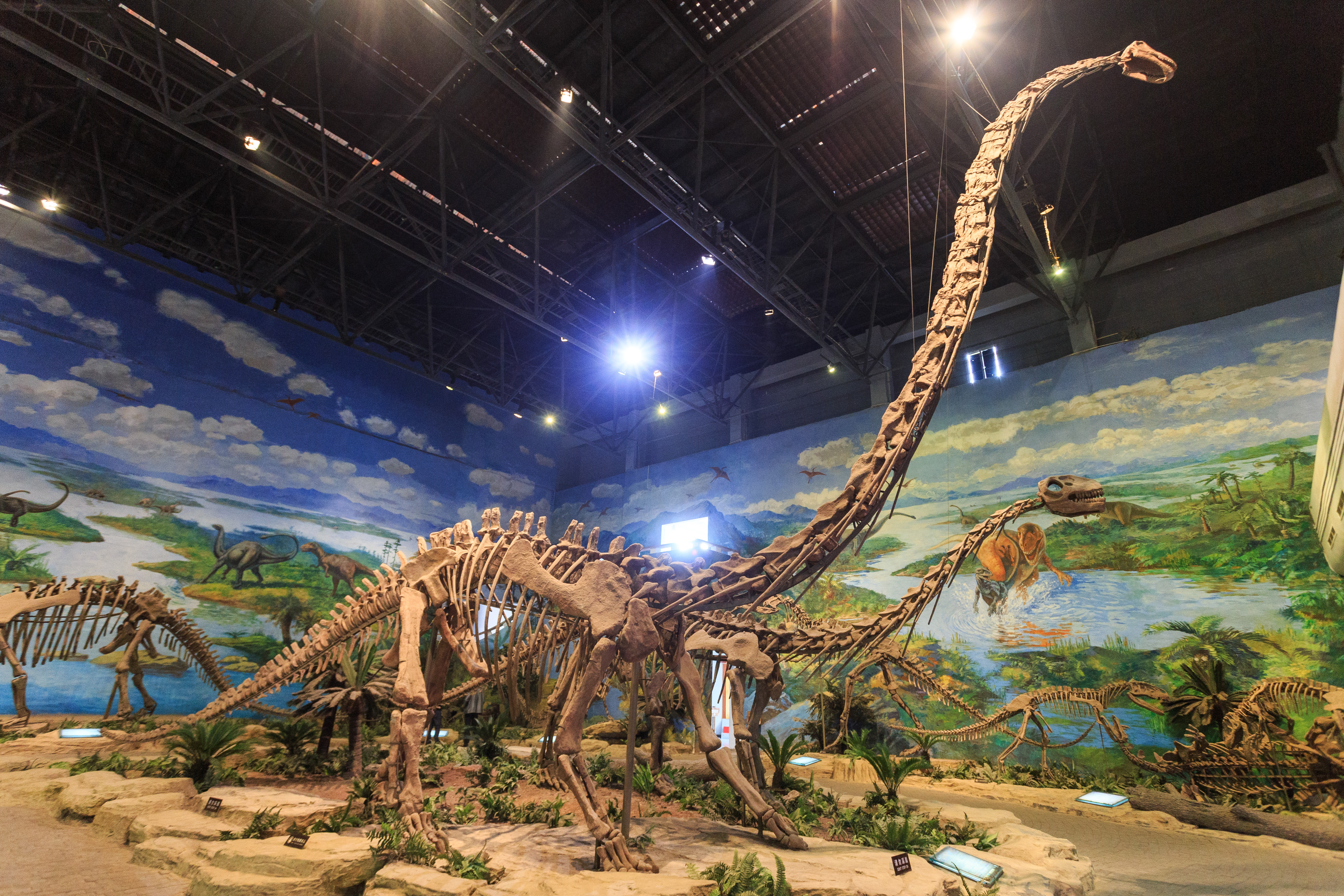
- Mounted skeleton of Mamenchisaurus hochuanensis
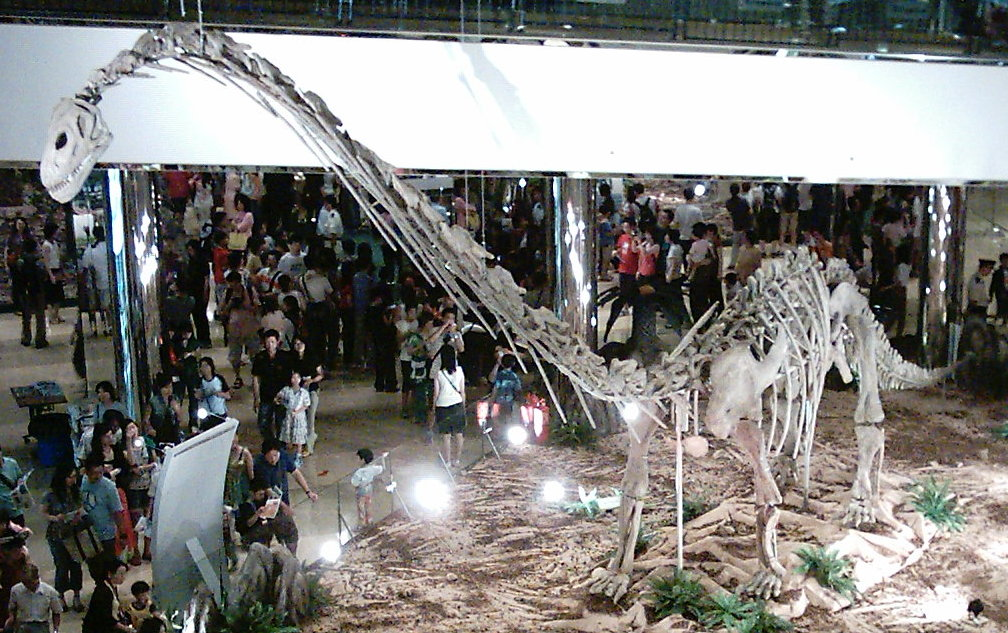
- Mounted skeleton of Omeisaurus tianfuensis

Scientific classification
- Kingdom: Animalia
- Phylum: Chordata
- Class: Reptilia
- Clade: Dinosauria
- Clade: Saurischia
- Clade: †Sauropodomorpha
- Clade: †Sauropoda
- Clade: †Eusauropoda
- Family: †Mamenchisauridae; Young and Zhao, 1972

Genera
- †Analong
- †Anhuilong
- †Chuanjiesaurus
- †Eomamenchisaurus
- †Huangshanlong
- †Hudiesaurus
- †Jingiella
- †Klamelisaurus
- †Mamenchisaurus
- †Omeisaurus
- †Qijianglong
- †Rhomaleopakhus
- †Tienshanosaurus
- †Tonganosaurus
- †Tongnanlong
- †Uragasaurus
- †Wamweracaudia
- †Xinjiangtitan
- †Yuanmousaurus
- †Zigongosaurus
Possible mamenchisaurids
- †Bellusaurus
- †Daanosaurus
- †Datousaurus
- †Rhoetosaurus
- †Spinophorosaurus

Synonyms
- Omeisauridae Wilson, 2002

= Mamenchisauridae =

Mamenchisauridae Temporal range: 184.5–114 Ma Possible Albian record

Extinct family of dinosaurs

Mamenchisauridae is a family of sauropod dinosaurs belonging to the Eusauropoda known from the Jurassic and Early Cretaceous of Asia and Africa. Mamenchisaurids are characterized by their proportionately extremely long necks. Some members of the group reached gigantic sizes, amongst the largest of all sauropods.

== Classification ==
The family Mamenchisauridae was first erected by Chinese paleontologists Yang Zhongjian ("C.C. Young") and Zhao Xijin in 1972, in a paper describing Mamenchisaurus hochuanensis.

A comprehensive analysis of Mamenchisauridae was presented by Moore et al., 2020, including several named species. Notably, some iterations of their analyses recovered Euhelopus and kin, usually considered somphospondylians, as relatives of mamenchisaurids, mirroring earlier conceptions about the family.

Several later publications built on the matrix of Moore et al. (2020), including the 2023 redescription of Mamenchisaurus sinocanadorum, the 2025 description of Mamenchisaurus sanjiangensis, and the 2026 description of Uragasaurus. The results of the latter analysis are displayed in the cladogram below:

- Eusauropoda
  - Shunosaurus lii
  - - Haute Moulouya taxon
    - - Omeisaurus maoianus
      - - Cetiosaurus oxoniensis
        - - Cetiosauriscus stewarti
          - - - Omeisaurus junghsiensis
              - Omeisaurus tianfuensis
            - - - Jobaria tiguidensis
                - Lapparentosaurus madagascariensis
              - - Mamenchisauridae
                  - - Bellusaurus sui
                    - Daanosaurus zhangi
                  - - Tienshanosaurus chitaiensis
                    - - Uragasaurus kalasinensis
                      - - Qijianglong guokr
                        - - - Chuanjiesaurus anaensis
                            - Mamenchisaurus sanjiangensis
                          - - - Wamweracaudia keranjei
                              - - Mamenchisaurus hochuanensis (referred)
                                - - Mamenchisaurus sinocanadorum
                                  - Xinjiangtitan shanshanensis
                            - - Mamenchisaurus constructus
                              - Mamenchisaurus youngi
                              - - Analong chuanjieensis
                                - Mamenchisaurus hochuanensis (holotype)
                                - - Klamelisaurus gobiensis
                                  - Phu Dan Ma taxon
                - - Atlasaurus imelakei
                  - - Turiasauria
                    - Neosauropoda
                      - Diplodocoidea
                      - Macronaria

== Paleobiology ==
Long-bone histology enables researchers to estimate the age that a specific individual reached. A study by Griebeler et al. (2013) examined long bone histological data and concluded that the unnamed mamenchisaurid SGP 2006/9 weighed 25,075 kilograms (27.6 short tons), reached sexual maturity at 20 years and died at age 31.

== Paleoecology ==
Fossils of Mamenchisaurus and Omeisaurus have been found in the Shaximiao Formation, dating to the Oxfordian-Tithonian interval, around 159-150 Ma (million years ago). Chuanjiesaurus fossils date between 166.1 and 163.5 Ma, while those of Eomamenchisaurus were found in the Zhanghe Formation, believed to be around 175.6-161.2 million years old. Fossils of Tonganosaurus date to even earlier, from the (Pliensbachian) Early Jurassic. The Tendaguru Formation taxon Wamweracaudia from Tanzania extends the geographic distribution of Mamenchisauridae into Africa, while fossil remains from the Itat Formation in Russia suggest they also reached Siberia. Additionally, an indeterminate cervical vertebra from the Phu Kradung Formation of Thailand demonstrates survival of Mamenchisauridae into the Cretaceous combined with new radiometric dates for the Suining Formation that has yielded fossils of Mamenchisaurus anyuensis.

== Sources ==
- Currie PJ, Padian K. Encyclopedia of Dinosaurs. p. 122.
