= Wamweracaudia =

Wamweracaudia Temporal range: 155–145 Ma Late Jurassic

Scientific classification
- Kingdom: Animalia
- Phylum: Chordata
- Class: Reptilia
- Clade: Dinosauria
- Clade: Saurischia
- Clade: †Sauropodomorpha
- Clade: †Sauropoda
- Family: †Mamenchisauridae
- Genus: †Wamweracaudia; Mannion et al, 2019
- Species: †W. keranjei

Binomial name
- †Wamweracaudia keranjei Mannion et al., 2019

Sauropod dinosaur

Wamweracaudia is a large herbivorous sauropod dinosaur from the Late Jurassic (155-145 million years ago) Tendaguru Formation of Tanzania, Africa.

== Discovery and naming ==
During the German expeditions to the Tendaguru in German East Africa between 1909 and 1912, paleontologist Werner Janensch supervised the excavation of a sauropod tail at "Site G". In 1929, he referred this tail to Gigantosaurus robustus.

In 1991, G. robustus was made the separate genus Janenschia. Janensch had referred the tail based on personal observation of a series of finds of comparable material. During the Second World War much of this was destroyed; also all of his field notes were lost. In a revision of the genus Janenschia by José Fernando Bonaparte e.a. in 2000, it was concluded that the tail no longer overlapped known extant Janenschia fossils while the remaining documentation was insufficient to justify a referral. In their study of the osteology of Lusotitan in 2013, Mannion et alii again excluded the tail, specimens MB.R.2091.1–30, from Janenschia due to its lack of overlap with its holotype SMNS 12144. They suggested that it may represent the first record of Mamenchisauridae from outside Asia.

The specimen was in 2019 given the new genus and species name Wamweracaudia keranjei by Philip D. Mannion, Paul Upchurch, Daniela Schwarz and Oliver Wings in their re-appraisal of Janenschia and other presumed titanosaur finds from the Tendaguru. The generic name combines a reference to the Wamwera, a tribe inhabiting the region of the find, with a Latin cauda, "tail". The specific name honours the native foreman leading the team that excavated the tail, Mohammadi Keranje.

Wamweracaudia is known from the holotype MB.R.2091.1–30, MB.R.3817.1 & MB.R.3817.2, found in a layer of the Tendagaru Formation dating from the Tithonian. It consists of an almost continuous series of thirty front and middle tail vertebrae, two neural spines of front tail vertebrae, and two chevrons. The tail vertebrae are numbered such that MB.R.2091.30 is the most anterior vertebra of the known series — though not necessarily the first tail vertebra — and MB.R.2091.1 the last one. Probably one vertebra is missing from the series.

== Description ==
The describing authors established four autapomorphies, unique derived traits. With the front and middle tail vertebrae, the upper surface is excavated at its rear. With the front tail vertebrae, the neural processes show a rough zone on the upper third part of their side surface, separated from the rough zone of the rear surface by a vertical groove. With the middle to rear vertebrae, the underside is strongly pinched transversely, forming a ridge instead of a distinct flat surface. With the middle to rear vertebrae, the neural processes show an elongated horizontal ridge on their sides, just above the level of the prezygapophyses, the front articulation processes.

Two additional traits are autapomorphies if Wamweracaudia is indeed a mamenchisaurid. The transverse processes or caudal ribs of the front tail vertebrae strongly curve sideways and to the front. With the front tail vertebrae, just in between the outer side of the prezygapophysis and the tip of the upper side of the diapophysis, the top rib facet, a pair of small extensions, or tubercula, is present.

== Phylogeny ==
An exact cladistic analysis, part of the 2019 study, showed that Wamweracaudia was placed in the Mamenchisauridae, as a sister species of Mamenchisaurus. The two taxa shared procoelous tail vertebrae. These are also present in the Titanosauria and when the tail was still referred to it, Janeschia had been seen as one of the earliest known titanosaurs.

== Paleobiology ==
As a sauropod, Wamweracaudia would have been a large quadrupedal herbivore.
