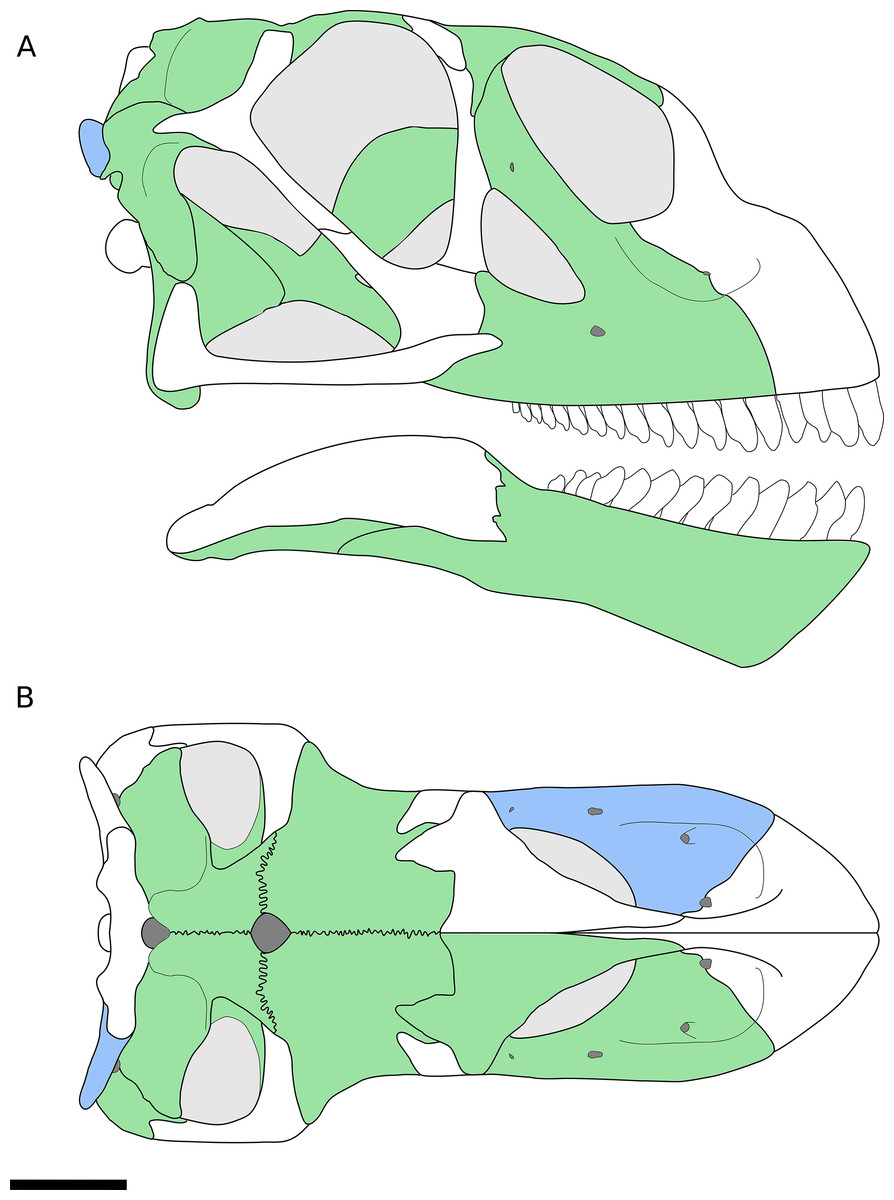
- Skull reconstruction

Scientific classification
- Kingdom: Animalia
- Phylum: Chordata
- Class: Reptilia
- Clade: Dinosauria
- Clade: Saurischia
- Clade: †Sauropodomorpha
- Clade: †Sauropoda
- Clade: †Eusauropoda
- Genus: †Bellusaurus; Dong, 1990
- Species: †B. sui

Binomial name
- †Bellusaurus sui Dong, 1990

= Bellusaurus =

Bellusaurus Temporal range: Oxfordian, 161 Ma

Extinct species of reptile

Bellusaurus (meaning "Beautiful lizard", from Vulgar Latin bellus 'beautiful' (masculine form) and Ancient Greek sauros 'lizard') was a sauropod dinosaur from the Late Jurassic (Oxfordian) known from juvenile specimens that would have measured about 4.8 metres (16 ft) long. Its fossils were found in Shishugou Formation rocks in the northeastern Junggar Basin in China.

== Discovery and naming ==
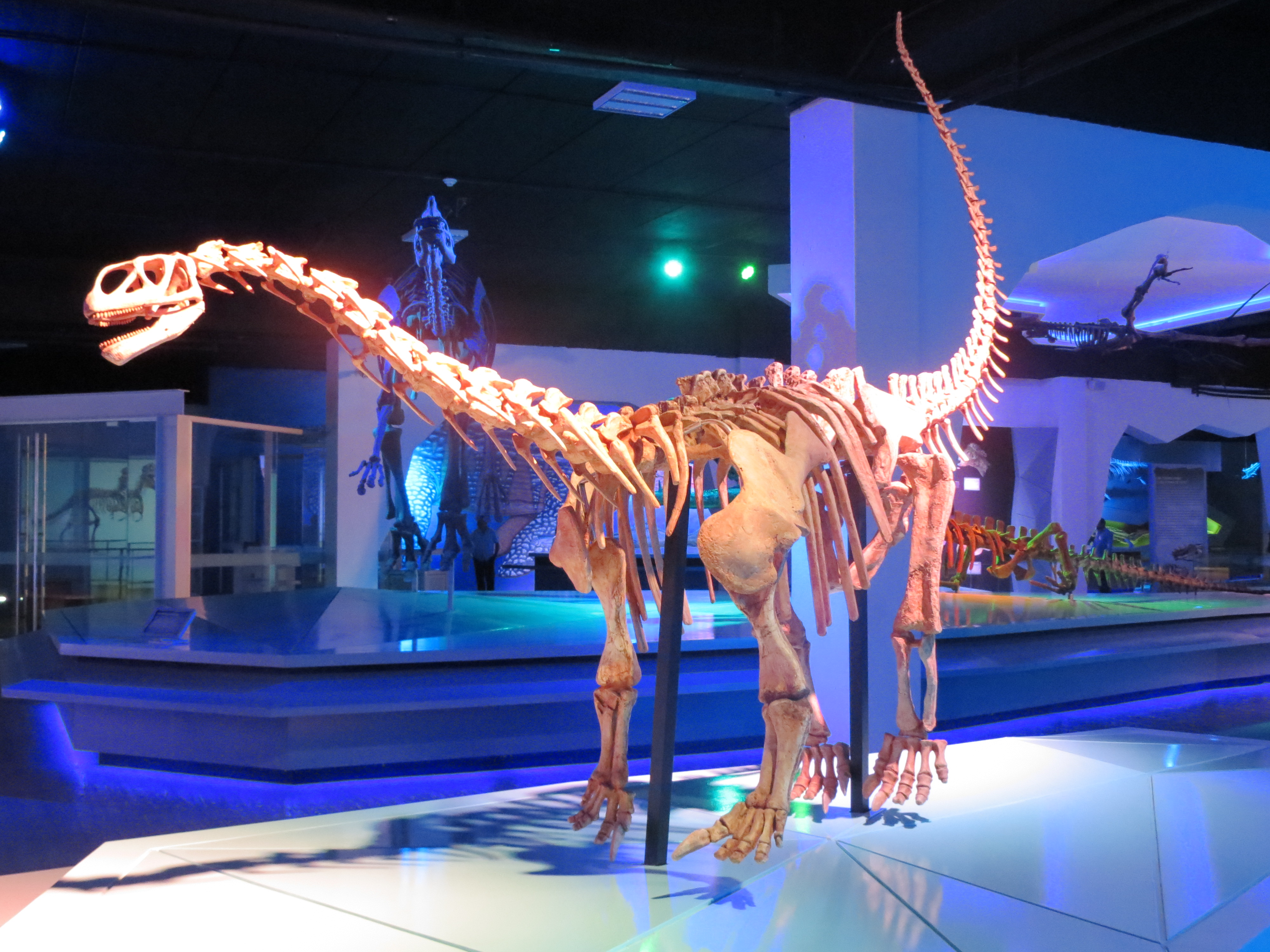
Restored skeleton

The type and only known species is Bellusaurus sui, formally described by Dong Zhiming in 1991. The remains of Bellusaurus were found in the Shishugou Formation in the northeastern Junggar Basin in China. Seventeen individuals were found in a single quarry, suggesting that a herd had been killed in a flash flood. Some features suggest they may have all been juveniles. Bellusaurus sui was derived from the Latin bellus meaning small, delicate, and beautiful, as these sauropods were small and lightly built. The specific name, sui, was named in honor of Senior Preparator Youling Sui, a notable restorer of dinosaur remains. Bellusaurus was the last restoration undertaken by Mr. Sui.

=== Fossil record ===
Bellusaurus sui is known from a large amount of disarticulated material of juvenile individuals. These specimens may have been only around two years old, and still rapidly growing, when they died.

== Description ==
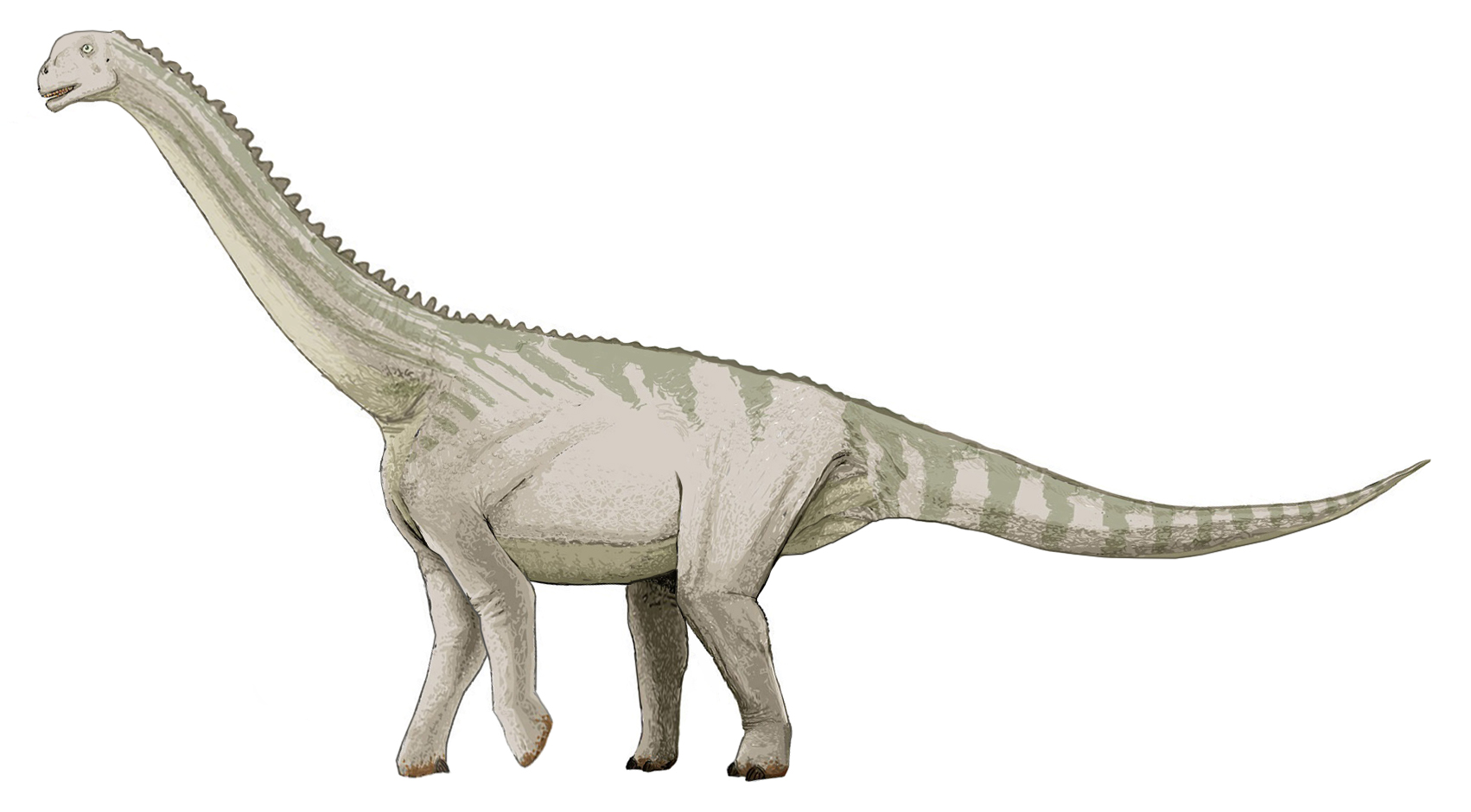
Life restoration

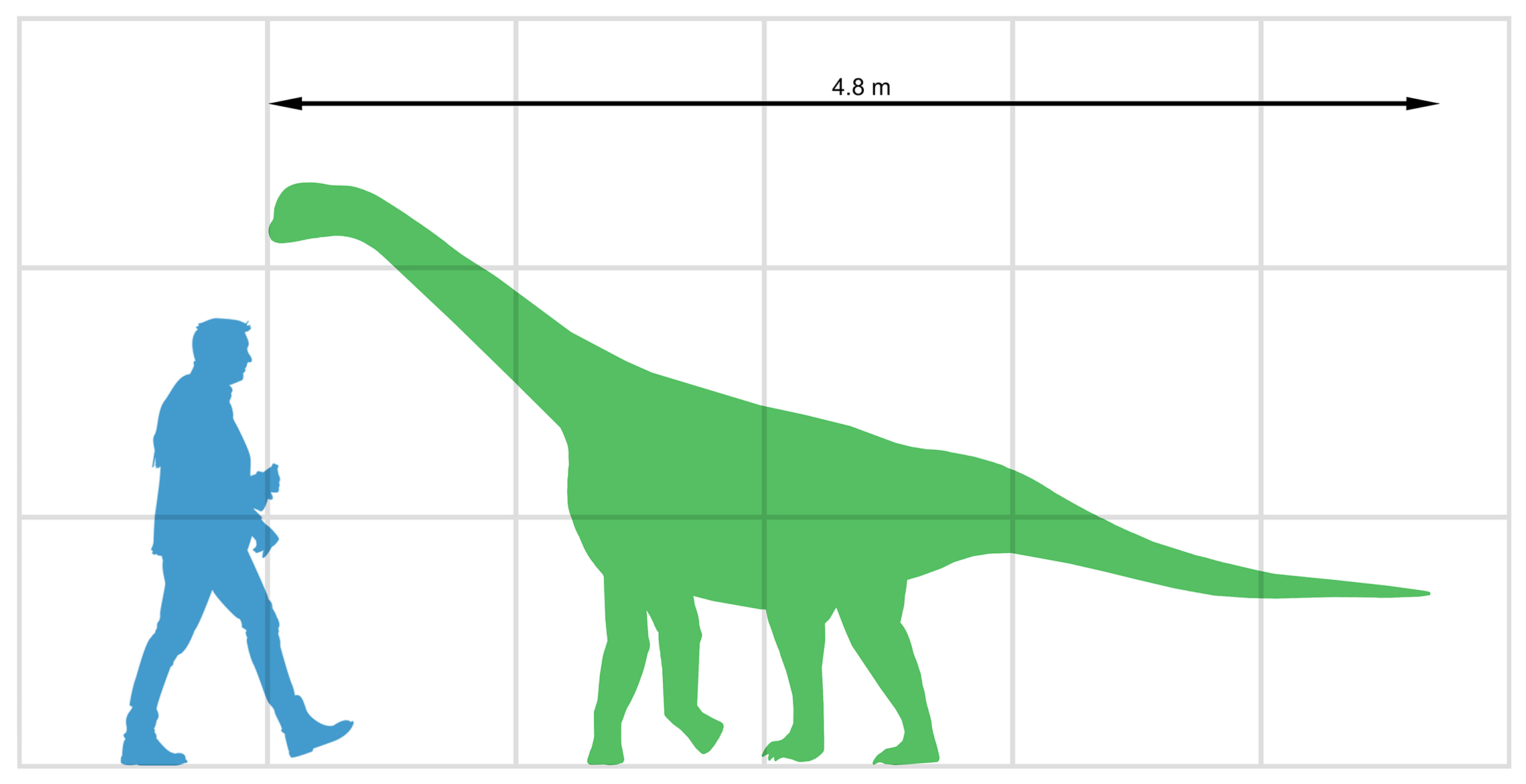
Size compared to a human

The length of Bellusaurus has been estimated to be 4.8 metres (16 ft), although this is based on juvenile individuals.

== Classification ==
Bellusaurus was originally placed in the Brachiosauridae by Dong, based on a historical classification scheme in which Brachiosauridae was used as a catch-all for sauropods with broad teeth, including taxa such as Camarasaurus, Cetiosaurus, and Euhelopus, rather than implying a close relationship with Brachiosaurus in particular. Dong established a new subfamily, Bellusaurinae, for Bellusaurus, and proposed that Pleurocoelus, another sauropod based on juvenile material, should also be classified in Bellusaurinae. More recent phylogenetic analyses have recovered Bellusaurus outside Neosauropoda or near the base of Macronaria. In 2023, a study proposed that Bellusaurus is a mamenchisaurid.
