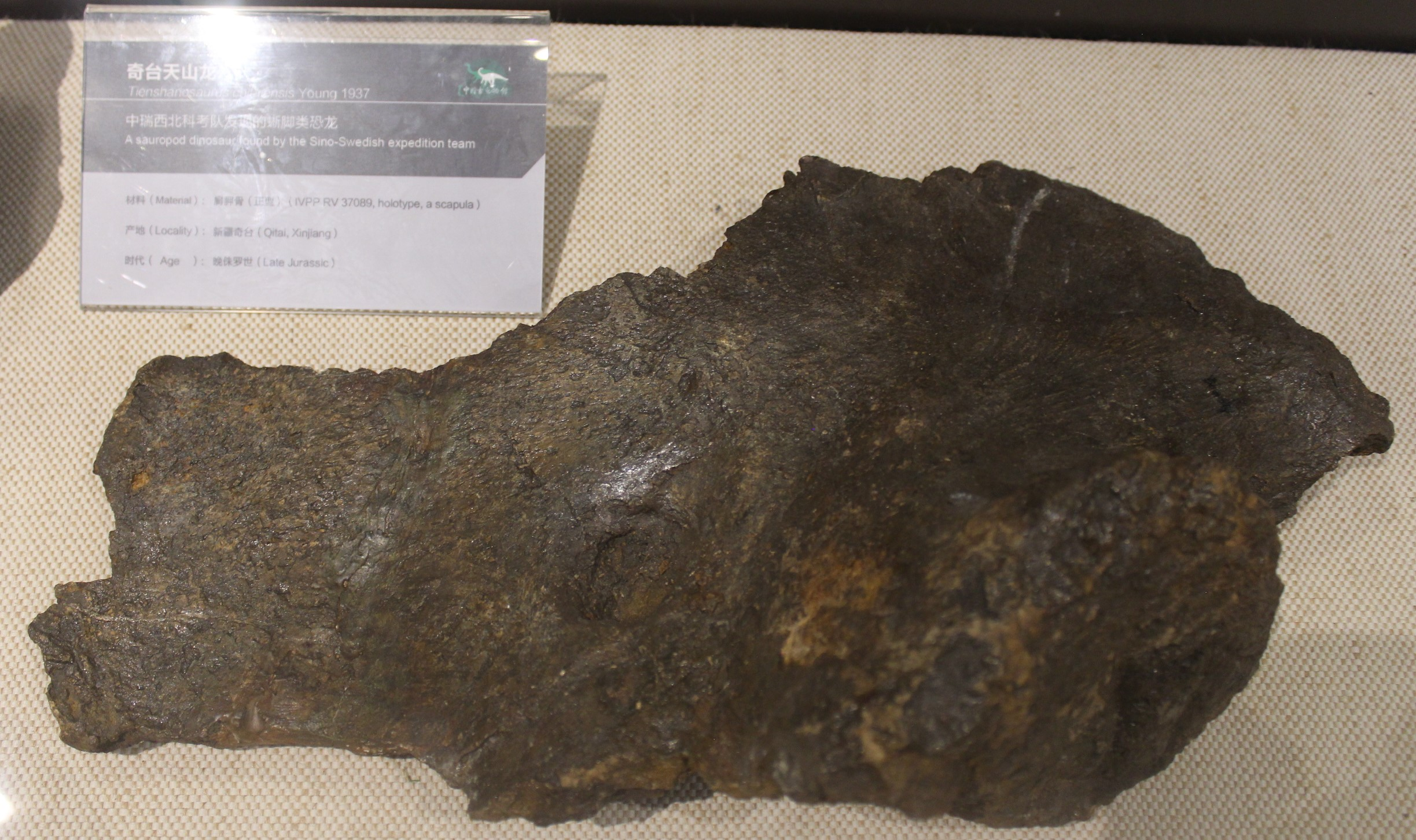
- Holotype scapula, Paleozoological Museum of China

Scientific classification
- Kingdom: Animalia
- Phylum: Chordata
- Class: Reptilia
- Clade: Dinosauria
- Clade: Saurischia
- Clade: †Sauropodomorpha
- Clade: †Sauropoda
- Family: †Mamenchisauridae
- Genus: †Tienshanosaurus; Yang, 1937
- Species: †T. chitaiensis

Binomial name
- †Tienshanosaurus chitaiensis Yang, 1937

= Tienshanosaurus =

Tienshanosaurus Temporal range: Late Jurassic, 163–157 Ma

Extinct genus of dinosaurs

Tienshanosaurus (meaning "Tienshan lizard") is an extinct genus of sauropod dinosaur from the Late Jurassic of what is now China. Only one species is known, Tienshanosaurus chitaiensis, which was named and described in 1937.

== Discovery and classification ==
On 11 September 1928 Chinese geology professor Yuan Fuli ("P.L. Yüan") discovered in Xinjiang the remains of about thirty adult and three juvenile sauropods, which he uncovered during the following weeks. The finds, including a fossilized egg, were sent to Beijing where they ultimately became part of the collection of the Institute of Vertebrate Paleontology and Paleoanthropology. In 1937 paleontologist Yang Zhongjian ("C.C. Young") named the type species Tienshanosaurus chitaiensis. The generic name, suggested by Yuan, refers to the Tian Shan, the "heavenly mountains". The specific name refers to the location Chitai or Qitai.

The holotype, IVPP AS 40002-3, was found near Paikushan, Luanshantze, in sandstone of the Shishugou Formation dating from the Oxfordian. It consists of elements of the postcrania. A considerable part of the skeleton is known but not the skull or the lower jaws. The body length has been estimated at twelve metres.

In 1991 Ralph Molnar renamed Euhelopus zdanskyi to Tienshanosaurus zdanskyi, despite the species having priority over T. chitaiensis, made possible by the fact that Euhelopus is a renaming of the earlier Helopus. Meanwhile, Valérie Martin-Rolland renamed T. chitaiensis into Euhelopus chitaiensis.

Due to the fragmentary nature of the material and a limited description, it has not been easy to establish the affinities of Tienshanosaurus. Originally classified in the Helopodinae, it has been assigned to many groups, among them the Astrodontidae, Euhelopodidae, Brachiosauridae, and Camarasauridae, but recent consensus (2011) has been to assign Tienshanosaurus to Mamenchisauridae.
