= Amargatitanis =

Amargatitanis Temporal range: Barremian-Early Aptian ~129.4–123 Ma
- Skeletal reconstruction, known material in teal

Scientific classification
- Kingdom: Animalia
- Phylum: Chordata
- Class: Reptilia
- Clade: Dinosauria
- Clade: Saurischia
- Clade: †Sauropodomorpha
- Clade: †Sauropoda
- Superfamily: †Diplodocoidea
- Family: †Dicraeosauridae
- Genus: †Amargatitanis; Apesteguía 2007
- Species: †A. macni

Binomial name
- †Amargatitanis macni Apesteguía 2007

Extinct genus of dinosaurs

Amargatitanis (meaning "Amarga giant") is a genus of dicraeosaurid sauropod dinosaur (a type of large, long-necked quadrupedal herbivorous dinosaur) from the Barremian-aged (Lower Cretaceous) La Amarga Formation of Neuquén, Argentina. It is known from a single, incomplete postcranial skeleton consisting of a partial hindlimb, ischium, and two vertebrae. These remains were unearthed by Argentine paleontologist José Bonaparte in 1983 during an expedition by the Museo Argentino de Ciencias Naturales and later described as a new genus and species, Amargatitanis macni by Sebastián Apesteguía. The genus name comes from the words Amarga, where the fossils were collected, and titanis meaning "titan". Its species name is in reference to the MACN (Museo Argentino de Ciencias Naturales), where the remains are stored.

Though initially thought to be a titanosaur, recent research has found it to be a dicraeosaurid, a group of short-necked, smaller sauropods. It reached around 12 meters (39.7 feet) long and 3.5 metric tons (3.9 short tons) according to one estimate. Like other dicraeosaurids, it has robust limbs, a long tail, and tall neural spines. However, much of its anatomy can only be inferred due to the lack of preserved bones. It lived in a diverse ecosystem that included higher browsing titanosauriforms and smaller, lower browsing dicraeosaurids like Amargatitanis itself.

== Discovery and naming ==
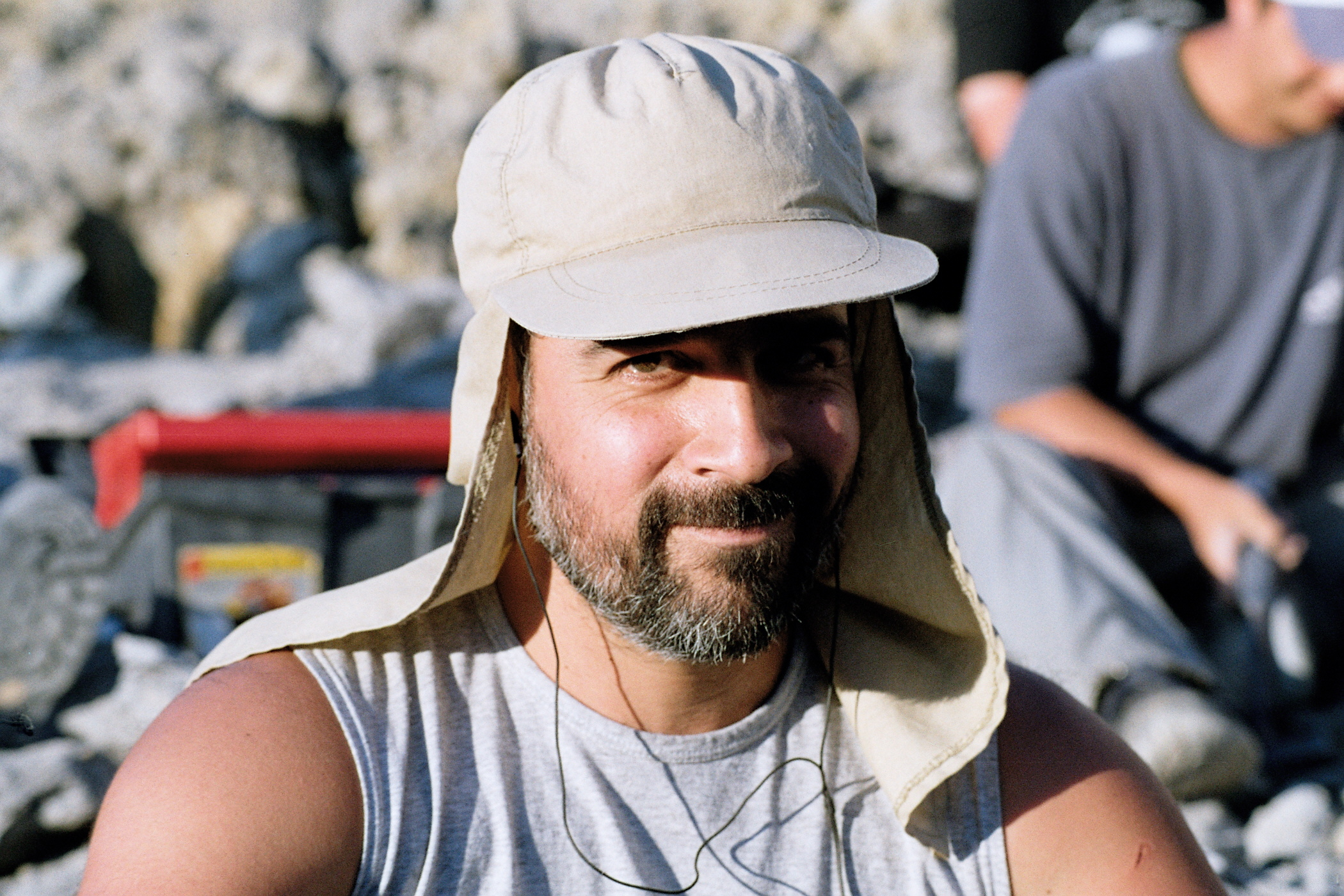
Portrait of Sebastián Apesteguía, describer of Amargatitanis.

During an expedition by the Museo Argentino de Ciencias Naturales from March 11 to 16 of 1983, Argentine paleontologist José Bonaparte collected several fossils from four sites along the La Amarga stream in Neuquén, Argentina. At site number "1", an associated skeleton of a large sauropod was unearthed by Bonaparte who noted the discovery in his personal journal. Bonaparte initially recorded the specimen as being from the Pichi Picún Leufú Formation, although they were subsequently determined to be from the La Amarga Formation. These remains were taken to the Museo Argentino de Ciencias Naturales where they were cataloged under the specimen number MACN PV N53.

The skeleton remained undescribed until 2007, when Argentine researcher Sebastián Apesteguía named it Amargatitanis macni. The genus name comes from Amarga, where the holotype was found, and titanis meaning "titan". Its species name, macni, is to honor the Museo Argentino de Ciencias Naturales (MACN). Apesteguía erroneously assigned a scapula (MACN PV N34) and six caudal vertebrae (MACN PV N51) to the specimen, despite coming from other rock layers and being found in 1986. It was originally assigned to the group Titanosauria due to the anatomy of the scapula and caudal vertebra, but a 2016 reanalysis of the holotype (MACN PV N53) fossils demonstrated that Amargatitanis was instead a dicraeosaurid dipolodocoid. The study, authored by researcher Pablo Gallina, also removed MACN PV N34 and N51 from the holotype material, which were referred to an indeterminate titanosauriform, and considered only the dicraeosaurid bones to be from the genus. Since Gallina's paper, several phylogenetic studies have recovered Amargatitanis as a dicraeosaurid.

=== Fossil record ===
Amargatitanis macni is known from a single specimen, the holotype MACN PV N53, which was found in the Barremian-aged Puesto Antigual Member of the La Amarga Formation, approximately 129 to 123 million years old. This specimen represents a mature individual and consists of an incomplete anterior caudal vertebra, an incomplete middle caudal vertebra, an incomplete right ischium, and most of the right hind limb, including the femur, partial tibia and fibula, astragalus, and the distal half of the first metatarsal. Field notes indicate that two phalanges and another metatarsal of this specimen were also collected, but as of 2016 they could not be located. A pair of anterior dorsal vertebrae from a dicraeosaurid that were also found in the La Amarga Formation, MOZ-Pv 6126-1 and MOZ-Pv 6126-2, could be additional remains of Amargatitanis, or belong to the other La Amarga Formation dicraeosaurid, Amargasaurus.

== Description ==
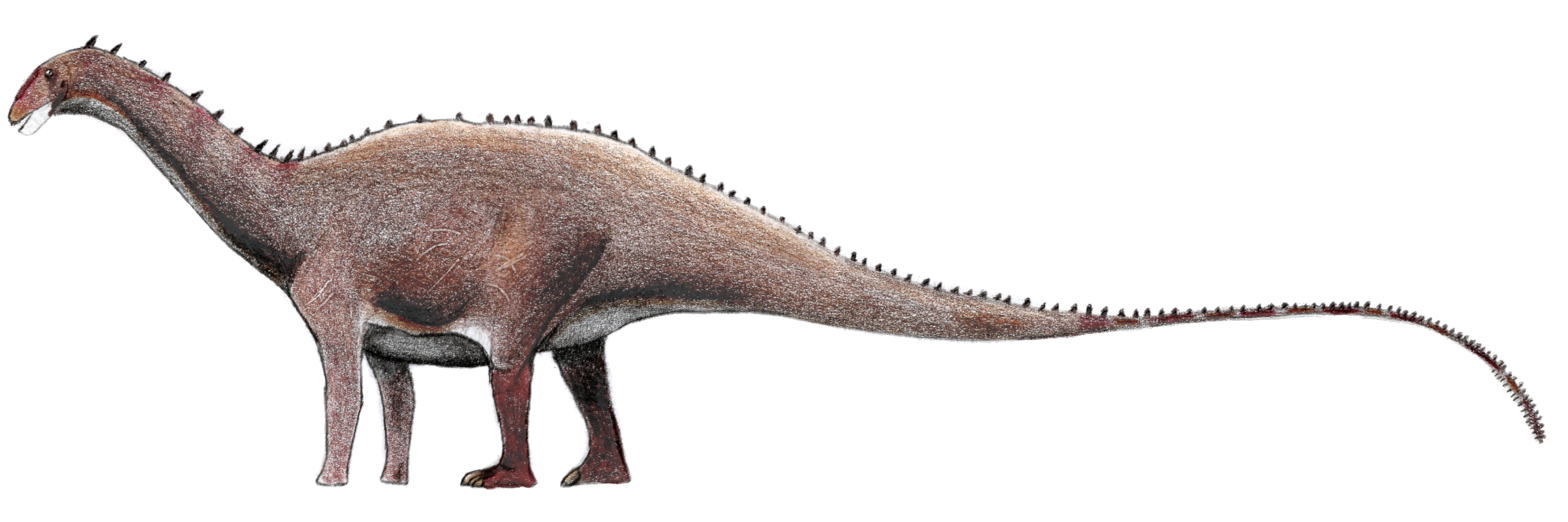
Life restoration

As a dicraeosaurid, Amargatitanis would have resembled better known members of the family such as Dicraeosaurus and Amargasaurus, which had shorter necks than most other sauropods and long neural spines extending from the vertebrae of the neck and trunk. It was a small sauropod, with one study estimating its mass at 11.406 metric tons (12.573 short tons), slightly larger than the same study's estimate for Amargasaurus of 10.195 metric tons (11.238 short tons). Mass estimates for Amargasaurus have been noted to vary widely depending on the method used, and studies using other methods, not yet applied to Amargatitanis, have found Amargasaurus to weigh 3.304 metric tons (3.642 short tons) to 4.376 metric tons (4.824 short tons).

From what is known of the caudal (tail) vertebrae of Amargatitanis, they generally resemble those of other dicraeosaurids. The centra (or "bodies") of these vertebrae are typical of flagellicaudatans, with gently concave anterior (front) faces and flat posterior (backside) faces. The prezygapophyseal centrodiapophysial fossae, which are deep depressions on the anterior surface of the transverse processes of the caudal vertebrae found in most diplodocoids and some macronarians, differ from other sauropods in that they contain a thin vertical lamina (sheet of bone). The caudal vertebrae of Amargatitanis resemble those of Pilmatueia, but not most other dicraeosaurids, in lacking ventrolateral ridges. The ischium generally resembles that of other flagellicaudatans, although it resembles the brachiosaurid Giraffatitan in that much of its posterior margin is straight.

The hind limb bones generally resemble those of other dicraeosaurids. The femur is distinctive in that it is much wider at its proximal (upper) end than at its distal (lower) end, whereas in other sauropods, including Dicraeosaurus, both ends are approximately equal in width. A similar condition may have been present in another dicraeosaurid, Pilmatueia. As in other dicraeosaurids, the lateral (outer) border of the femur is gently curved and lacks the distinct lateral bulge characteristic of titanosauriforms. The tibia has a low cnemial crest, similar to that of Dicraeosaurus and Amargasaurus and unlike the higher cnemial crest found in most macronarians. The posterior fossa of the astragalus differs from other sauropods in being deep and crescent-shaped, and in the arrangement of the foramina (openings) within it. The distal end of the first metatarsal has an oval shape, rather than being constricted in the middle to form distinct medial and lateral condyles as in Dicraeosaurus. The metatarsal has a distinct posterolateral (pointing both to the side and backwards) projection, as in other flagellicaudatans.

== Classification ==
Apesteguía originally hypothesized in 2007 that Amargatitanis was a member of Titanosauria, a group of large, macronarian sauropods, based on features of the femur and scapula. However, two later papers argued that these titanosaurian traits were instead a misinterpretation of broken elements. In 2012, D'Emic in turn regarded Amargatitanis as a nomen dubium and that the fossils could not be from the same individual, making it a chimera. A 2016 study by Pablo Gallina found that characteristics such as the lack of a lateral bulge on the femur and presence of procoelous vertebrae (centra being concave at the front and convex at the back) meant Amargatitanis belonged to the family Dicraeosauridae. This claim was supported by phylogenetic analyses conducted by Gallina and later studies, which typically found Amargatitanis at the base of the family. In 2022, researcher Guillermo Windholz and colleagues argued that South American dicraeosaurids formed a clade based on their biogeography and results of phylogenetic analyses, with Amargatitanis being especially closely related to Pilmatueia and Bajadasaurus. They also hypothesized that Dicraeosauridae originated in North America, with the earliest known genera being Suuwassea and Smitanosaurus.

Bajpai and colleagues, in 2023, recovered Amargatitanis as an advanced dicraeosaurid in polytomy with Pilmatueia and a group containing Brachytrachelopan, Dicraeosaurus, and the contemporary Amargasaurus. The results of their phylogenetic analyses are shown in the cladogram below:

- Diplodocoidea
  - Rebbachisauridae
  - Flagellicaudata
    - Diplodocidae
    - Dicraeosauridae
      - Suuwassea
      - - Lingwulong
        - - Bajadasaurus
          - - Tharosaurus
            - - Pilmatueia
              - Amargatitanis
              - - Brachytrachelopan
                - - Dicraeosaurus hansemanni
                  - Amargasaurus

== Life history ==
In a 2021 paper, two Argentine researchers, Guillermo J. Windholz and Ignacio A. Cerda, examined the bone histology of Amargatitanis using thin sections from a femur. The study sought to evaluate the age of the specimen by counting the number and spacing of cyclical growth marks (concentric lines similar to the growth rings of a tree), which formed in periods of slow growth. Sauropods are thought to be characterised by high rates of continuous growth, and, as a consequence, cyclical growth marks usually form only after sexual maturity is reached. Growth continued after sexual maturity, with adult size being reached much later.

The femur of Amargatitanis bears 19 cyclical growth marks, indicating that the individual was at least 19 years old at the time of death. The six outermost growth marks are closely spaced, a structure known as an external fundamental system, indicating that the individual had not only reached sexual maturity but also its adult size. This assessment is supported by the extensive remodeling of the cortical bone, a trait associated with anatomical and sexual maturity. The high number of cyclical growth marks seen in Amargatitanis is unusual for sauropods, and possibly indicates that some sauropods grew discontinuously rather than continuously.

== Paleoenvironment ==
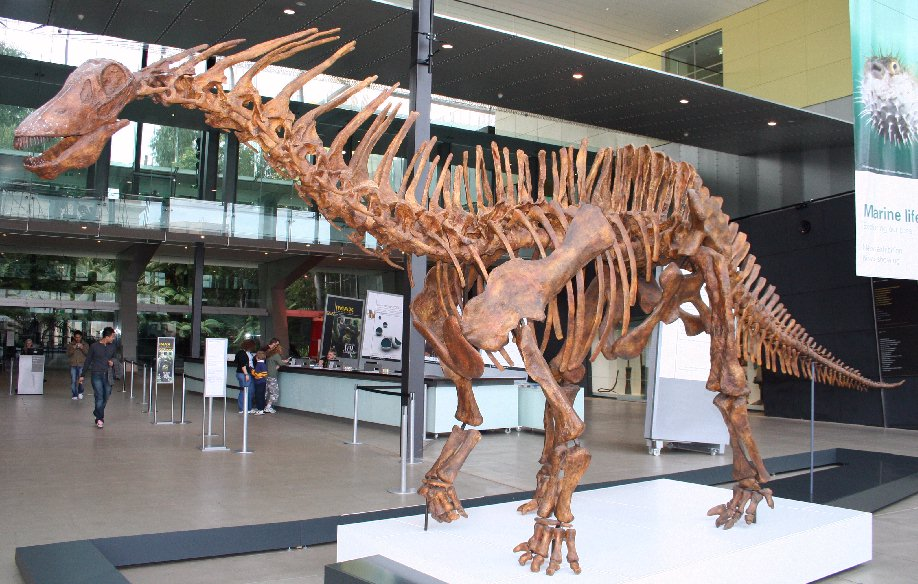
Skeleton of Amargasaurus, a sauropod that coexisted with Amargatitanis.

Amargatitanis stems from sedimentary rocks of the La Amarga Formation, which is part of the Neuquén Basin and dates to the Barremian and late Aptian of the Early Cretaceous. Most vertebrate fossils, including Amargatitanis, have been found in the lowermost (oldest) part of the formation, the Puesto Antigual Member. This member is approximately 29 meters (95 ft) in thickness and mainly composed of sandstones deposited by braided rivers. The sauropod fauna of the La Amarga Formation was diverse and included the basal rebbachisaurid Zapalasaurus, the dicraeosaurid Amargasaurus, and unnamed remains of basal titanosauriforms. The high diversity suggests that different sauropod species exploited different food sources in order to reduce competition. Basal titanosauriforms showed proportionally longer necks, longer forelimbs, and broader tooth crowns than dicraeosaurids and rebbachisaurids, suggesting greater feeding heights. Amargatitanis and Amargasaurus probably fed above ground level at heights of up to 2.7 meters (8.9 ft), as evidenced by the anatomy of their neck and inner ear. Rebbachisaurids like Zapalasaurus presumably fed at ground-level, while basal Titanosauriforms exploited food sources at higher levels.

Other dinosaurs of the La Amarga Formation include an indeterminate stegosaur; predatory dinosaurs include the small ceratosaur Ligabueino, and the presence of a large tetanuran is indicated by teeth. Other than dinosaurs, the formation is notable for the cladotherian mammal Vincelestes, the only mammal known from the Early Cretaceous of South America. Crocodylomorphs are represented by the trematochampsid Amargasuchus.
