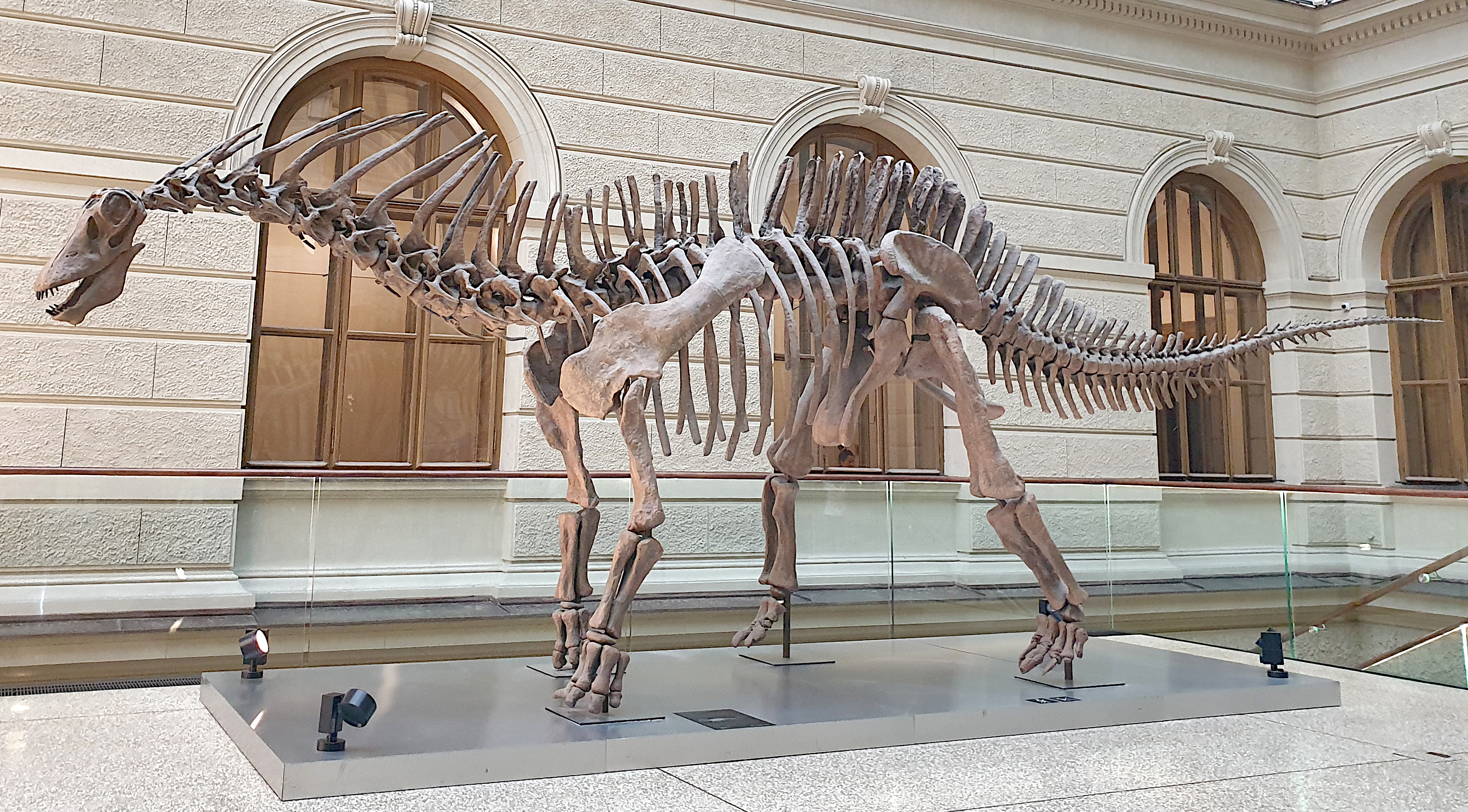
- Amargasaurus skeleton cast in the National Museum, Prague.

Scientific classification
- Kingdom: Animalia
- Phylum: Chordata
- Class: Reptilia
- Clade: Dinosauria
- Clade: Saurischia
- Clade: †Sauropodomorpha
- Clade: †Sauropoda
- Superfamily: †Diplodocoidea
- Family: †Dicraeosauridae
- Genus: †Amargasaurus; Salgado & Bonaparte, 1991
- Species: †A. cazaui

Binomial name
- †Amargasaurus cazaui Salgado & Bonaparte, 1991

= Amargasaurus =

Amargasaurus Temporal range: Early Cretaceous (Barremian to Aptian), 130–120 Ma

Dicraeosaurid sauropod dinosaur genus from the Early Cretaceous period

Amargasaurus (/əˌmɑːrɡəˈsɔːrəs/; "La Amarga lizard") is a genus of sauropod dinosaur from the Early Cretaceous epoch (130–120 mya) of what is now Argentina. The only known skeleton was discovered in 1984 and is virtually complete, including a fragmentary skull, making Amargasaurus one of the best-known sauropods of its epoch. Amargasaurus was first described in 1991 and contains a single known species, Amargasaurus cazaui. It was a large animal, but small for a sauropod, reaching 9 to 13 meters (30 to 43 feet) in length. Most distinctively, it sported two parallel rows of tall spines down its neck and back, taller than in any other known sauropod. Several studies postulated that, in life, the spines stuck out of the body as individual structures that supported a horn sheath. Analysis of the bone structure suggests that the spines were connected by ligaments and could have formed a scaffold supporting a neck sail. They might have been used for display, combat, or defense.

Amargasaurus was discovered in sedimentary rocks of the La Amarga Formation, which dates back to the Barremian and Aptian stages of the Early Cretaceous. A herbivore, it shared its environment with at least three other sauropod genera, which might have exploited different food sources in order to reduce competition. Amargasaurus probably fed at mid-height, as shown by the orientation of its inner ear and the articulation of its neck vertebrae, which suggest a habitual position of the snout 80 centimeters (31 inches) above the ground and a maximum height of 2.7 meters (8.9 feet). Within the Sauropoda, Amargasaurus is classified as a member of the family Dicraeosauridae, which differs from other sauropods in showing shorter necks and smaller body sizes.

== Description ==
Size comparison of the Dicraeosauridae members. Amargasaurus is green.

Amargasaurus was small for a sauropod, measuring 9 to 13 meters (30 to 43 feet) in length and weighing approximately 2.5–4 metric tons (2.8–4.4 short tons). It followed the typical sauropod body plan, with a long tail and neck, a small head, and a barrel-shaped trunk supported by four column-like legs. The neck of Amargasaurus was shorter than in most other sauropods, a common trait within the Dicraeosauridae. Measuring 2.39 meters (7.8 feet) in length, the neck corresponded to 136% of the length of the dorsal vertebral column. This is comparable to Dicraeosaurus (123%) but greater than in the extremely short-necked form Brachytrachelopan (75%). The neck consisted of thirteen cervical vertebrae, which were opisthocoelous (convex at the front and hollow at the back), forming ball-and-socket joints with neighboring vertebrae. The trunk was made out of nine dorsal and probably five fused sacral vertebrae. The foremost dorsals were opisthocoelous, while the remaining dorsals were amphiplatyan (flat on both ends). Robust transverse processes (lateral projections connecting to the ribs) indicate a strongly developed rib cage. The dorsal vertebrae of Amargasaurus and other dicraeosaurids lacked pleurocoels, the deep lateral excavations that were characteristic for other sauropods.

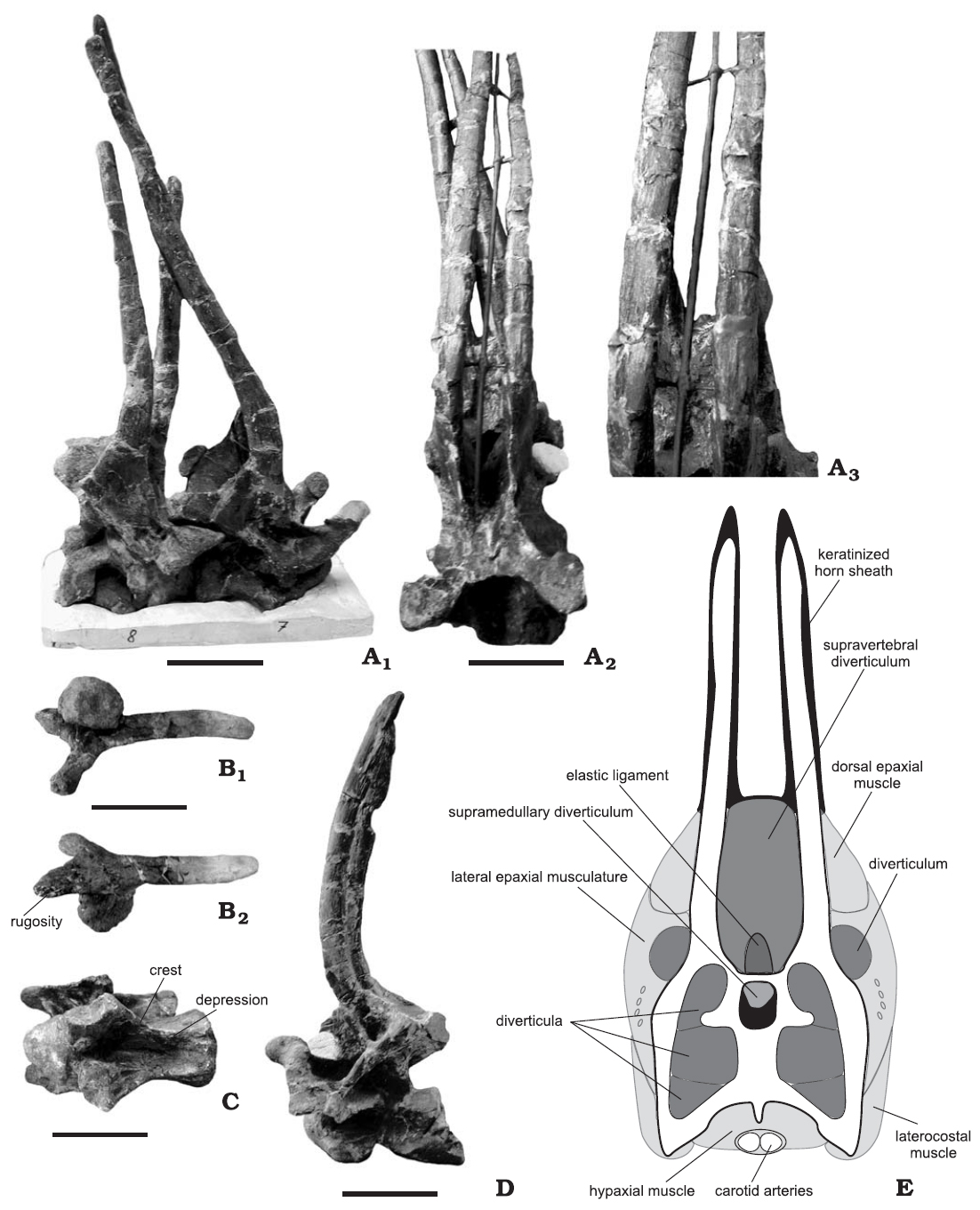
Neck vertebrae of the holotype, with cross-section reconstruction of soft-tissue

The most striking features of the skeleton were the extremely tall, upwardly projecting neural spines on the neck and anterior dorsal vertebrae. From the third cervical onward, these neural spines were bifurcated along their entire length, forming a double row. They were circular in cross section and tapered towards their tips. The tallest spines could be found on the middle part of the neck, where they reached 60 centimeters (24 inches) on the 8th cervical. On the neck, they were bowed backward, projecting above the adjacent vertebra. A similar elongated neural spine has been described from the neck region of the closely related Bajadasaurus in 2019. Unlike in Amargasaurus, this spine was bowed frontward and broadened toward the tips. The last two dorsal vertebrae, the hip, and the foremost tail in Amargasaurus also had elongated spines; these were not bifurcated but flared into a paddle-shaped upper end. The pelvic region was relatively wide, judging from the long, laterally projecting transverse processes of the sacral vertebrae. The forelimbs were somewhat shorter than the hind limbs, as in related sauropods. Most of the hand and foot bones were not preserved, but Amargasaurus probably possessed five digits each as in all sauropods.

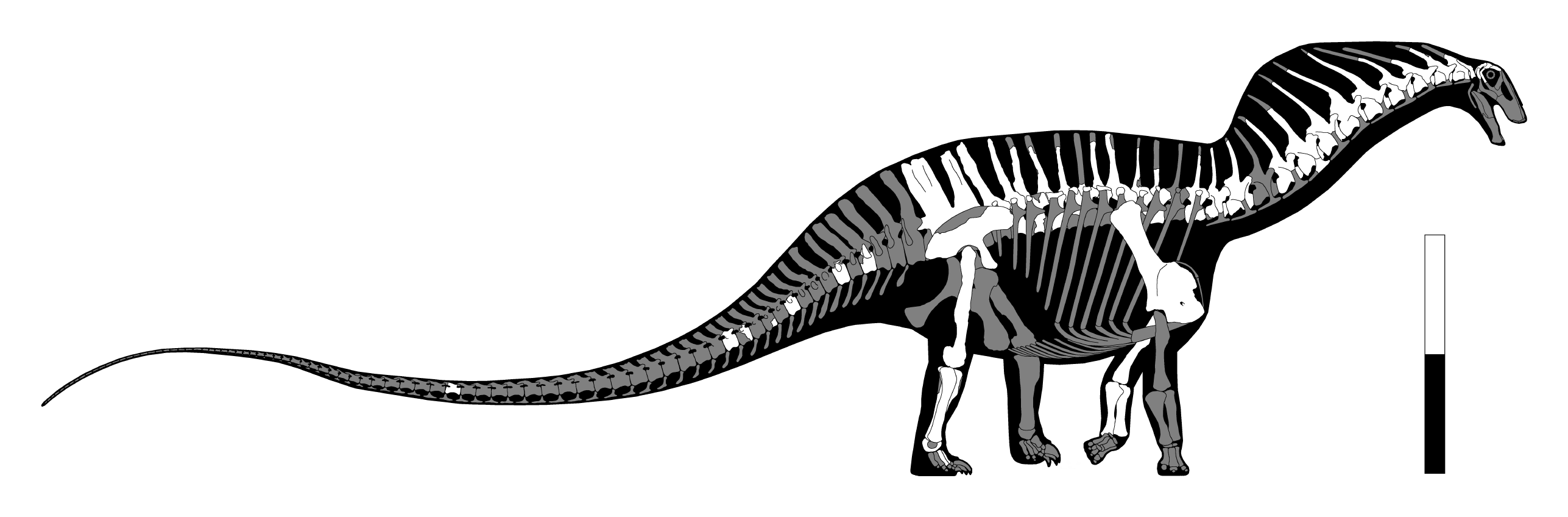
Skeletal reconstruction, with known elements in white

Only the rear part of the skull is preserved. It likely showed a horselike, broad snout equipped with pencil-like teeth, as seen in related sauropods for which more complete skulls are known. As in other dicraeosaurids, the external naris (nostril opening) was situated in the posterior half of the skull, diagonally above the orbit (eye opening), which was proportionally large. As in most other dinosaurs, the skull featured three additional openings (fenestrae). The infratemporal fenestra, located below the orbit, was long and narrow. Behind the orbit was the supratemporal fenestra, which in dicraeosaurids was uniquely small and can be seen when the skull is viewed from the side. This contrasts with other diapsid reptiles, where these openings were directed upward, thus being visible only in top view. The antorbital fenestra would have been located in front of the eye opening, although this region is not preserved. An unusual feature were small openings seen on the backside of the skull, the so-called parietal openings or fontanelles. In other tetrapods, these openings are usually seen only in juveniles and would close as the individual grows. Skull features shared with Dicraeosaurus but absent in most other sauropods included the fused frontal bones and the notably long basipterygoid processes, bony extensions connecting the braincase with the palate.

== Discovery ==
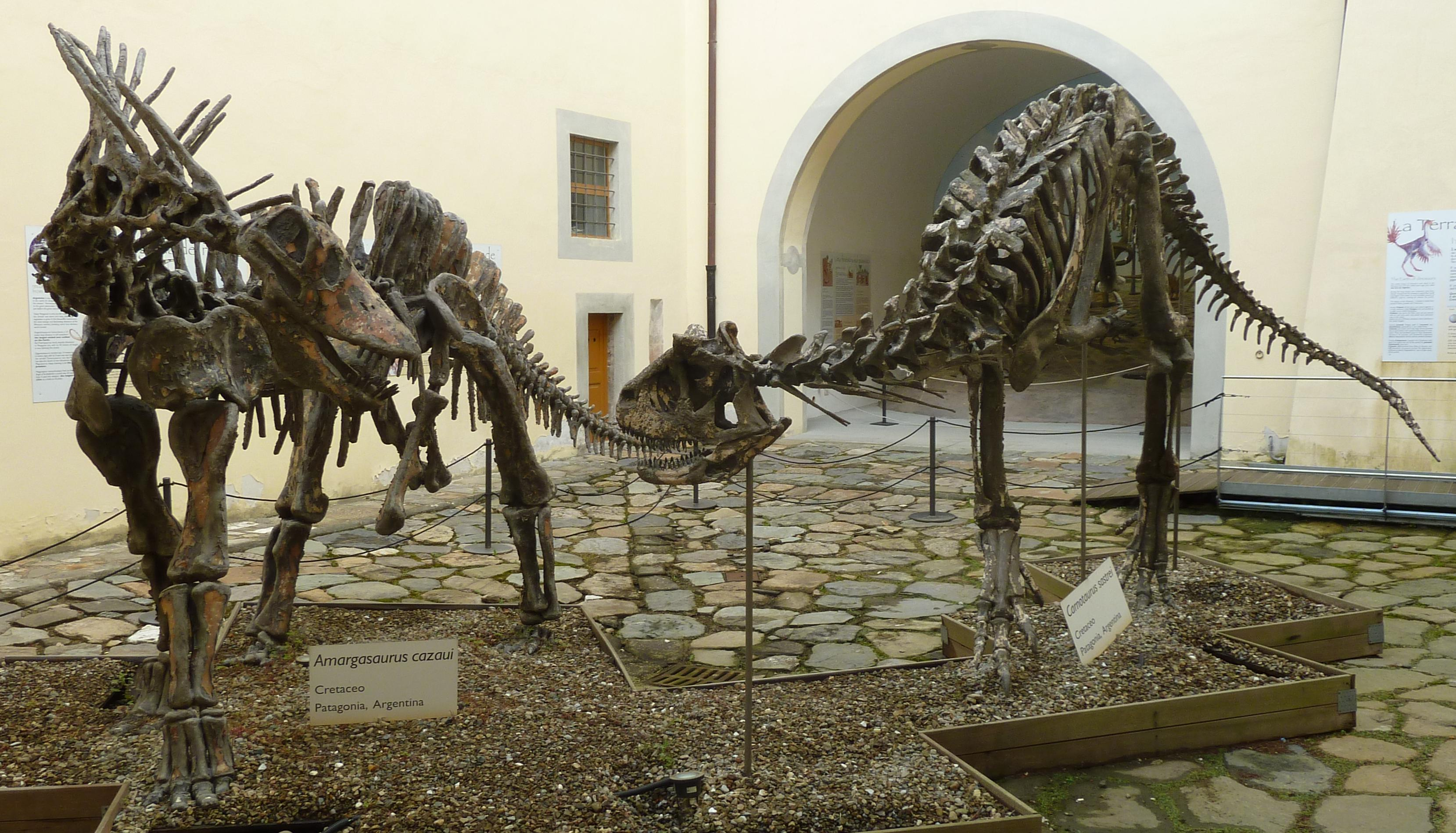
Casts of Amargasaurus and Carnotaurus, both discovered by the same 1984 expedition in Argentina, Natural History Museum of the University of Pisa

The only known skeleton (specimen number MACN-N 15) was discovered in February 1984 by Guillermo Rougier during an expedition led by Argentine paleontologist José Bonaparte. This was the eighth expedition of the project "Jurassic and Cretaceous Terrestrial Vertebrates of South America", which was supported by the National Geographic Society and initiated in 1975 to improve on the sparse knowledge of the Jurassic and Cretaceous tetrapod life of South America. The same excursion uncovered the nearly complete skeleton of the horned theropod Carnotaurus. The discovery site is located in the La Amarga arroyo in the Picún Leufú Department of Neuquén Province in northern Patagonia, 70 kilometers (43 miles) south of Zapala. The skeleton stems from sedimentary rocks of the La Amarga Formation, which dates to the Barremian through early Aptian stages of the Early Cretaceous, or around 130 to 120 million years ago.

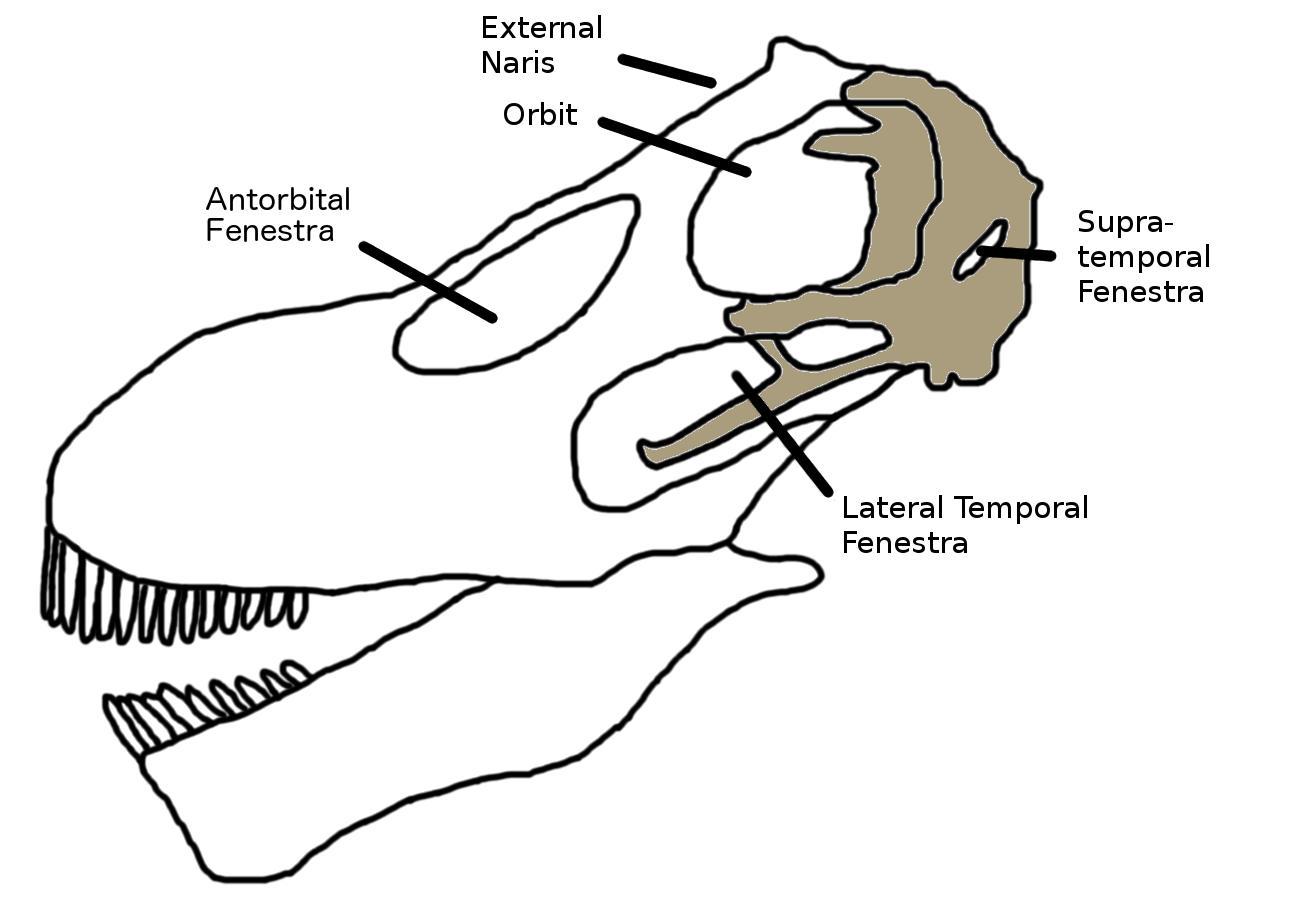
Skull reconstruction, redrawn after, showing known material (brown) and the location of the various skull openings. Missing parts are reconstructed after Dicraeosaurus.

The skeleton is reasonably complete and includes a partial skull. Sauropod skull bones are rarely found, and the Amargasaurus skull is only the second skull known from a member of the Dicraeosauridae. Major parts of the skeleton were found in their original anatomical position: the vertebral column of the neck and back, which consisted of 22 articulated vertebrae, was found connected to both the skull and the sacrum. Of the skull, only the temporal region and the braincase are preserved. The sacrum, despite being partly eroded prior to burial, is fairly complete. Most of the tail is missing, with three anterior, three middle, and one posterior vertebrae being preserved, along with fragments of several others. The shoulder girdle is known from the scapula (shoulder blade) and coracoid (which sits on the lower end of the scapula), while the pelvis is merely known from the ilium (the uppermost of the three pelvic bones). The limbs are equally fragmentary, with the manus (hand) and most of the pes (foot) missing. The skeleton is currently stored in the collection of the Bernardino Rivadavia Natural Sciences Museum in Buenos Aires.

The first, unofficial, mention of Amargasaurus as a new genus of dinosaur was published by Bonaparte in the 1984 Italian book Sulle Orme dei Dinosauri. Here, the species was designated as Amargasaurus groeberi, honoring Pablo Groeber, which was changed into Amargasaurus cazaui in the official description published several years later. The official description, written in Spanish, was published in 1991 by Leonardo Salgado and Bonaparte in the Argentinian scientific journal Ameghiniana. The name Amargasaurus alludes to the site of discovery, the La Amarga Arroyo. La Amarga is also the name of a nearby town, as well as the geologic formation the remains were recovered from. The word amarga is Spanish for "bitter", while sauros is Greek for "lizard". The one species (A. cazaui) is named in honor of Luis Cazau, a geologist with the YPF oil company, which at the time was state-owned. In 1983, Cazau informed Bonaparte's team about the paleontological significance of the La Amarga Formation, leading to the discovery of the skeleton. One year later, Salgado and Jorge O. Calvo published a second paper focusing on the description of the skull.

== Classification ==
Amargasaurus is classified as a member of the Dicraeosauridae, a family ranked clade within the Diplodocoidea. Currently, this clade consists of nine species belonging to eight genera. These include Lingwulong shenqi from the Early or Middle Jurassic of China and four species from the Late Jurassic: Brachytrachelopan mesai from Argentina; Suuwassea emilieae from the Morrison Formation of the United States; and Dicraeosaurus hansemanni and Dicraeosaurus sattleri from the Tendaguru beds of Tanzania. Amargasaurus was the first dicraeosaurid known from the Cretaceous, although additional dicraeosaurids from the Lower Cretaceous have been described more recently, including Pilmatueia faundezi, Amargatitanis macni, and Bajadasaurus pronuspinax, which are all from Argentina. An unnamed specimen from Brazil indicates that this group persisted at least until the end of the Early Cretaceous. Most analyses find Dicraeosaurus and Brachytrachelopan to be more closely related to each other than to Amargasaurus. Suuwassea is generally recovered as the most basal member of the family. A 2015 analysis by Tschopp and colleagues came to the preliminary result that two poorly known genera from the Morrison Formation, Dyslocosaurus polyonychius and Dystrophaeus viaemalae, might be additional members of the Dicraeosauridae.

Together with the Diplodocidae and the Rebbachisauridae, the Dicraeosauridae is nested inside the Diplodocoidea. All members of the Diplodocoidea are characterized by their box-shaped snout and narrow teeth restricted to the foremost portion of the jaws. Both the Dicraeosauridae and the Diplodocidae are characterized by bifurcated neural spines of the cervical and dorsal vertebra. In the Dicraeosauridae, the bifurcated neural spines were strongly elongated, a trend reaching its extreme in Amargasaurus.

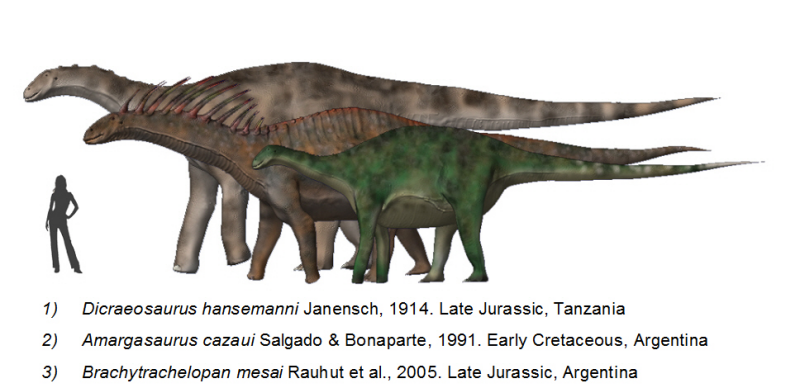
Size comparison between a human, Dicraeosaurus, Amargasaurus, and Brachytrachelopan

The following cladogram by Gallina and colleagues (2019) shows the presumed relationships between members of the Dicraeosauridae:

- Diplodocoidea
  - Rebbachisauridae
  - Flagellicaudata
    - Diplodocidae
    - Dicraeosauridae
      - - Suuwassea
        - - Lingwulong
          - - Bajadasaurus
            - - Pilmatueia
              - - Amargasaurus
                - Dicraeosaurus
                - Brachytrachelopan

== Paleobiology ==
=== Vertebral spines ===
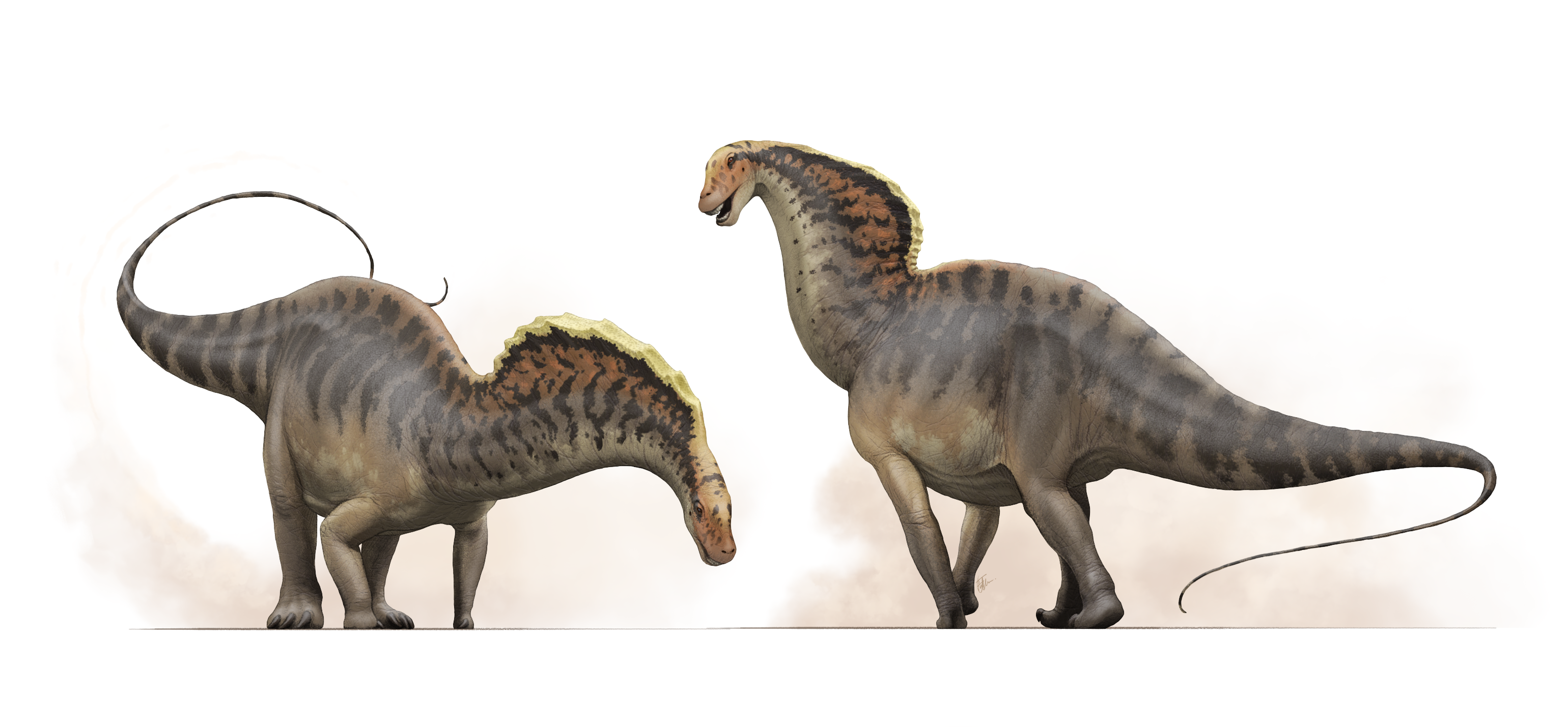
Life restoration of a pair of displaying Amargasaurus with "cervical sails" based on Cerda and colleagues, 2022

Both the function and the appearance in life of the extremely elongated and bifurcated vertebral spines remain elusive. Salgado and Bonaparte, in 1991, suggested the spines represented defense weapons against predators, arguing that they tapered towards their tips. They also could have served for display, perhaps for courtship or to intimidate rivals. Some subsequently published life restorations showed the double row of spines supporting two parallel skin sails. Gregory Paul, in 1994, considered this possibility unlikely, noting that neck sails would have reduced neck flexion, and that the spines were circular in cross-section rather than flattened as is the case in sail-bearing animals. Instead, he found that this shape indicates that the spines supported a keratinous (horn) sheath that would have extended the length of the spines in life. The spines could have been used for display or as weapons both against predators and members of the same species, as the animal might have been able to point its most anterior spines forward by bending its neck. He also hypothesized that the spines could have been clattered together to generate sound. Keratinous sheaths covering the spines were also shown in a 1999 skeletal restoration published by Salgado.

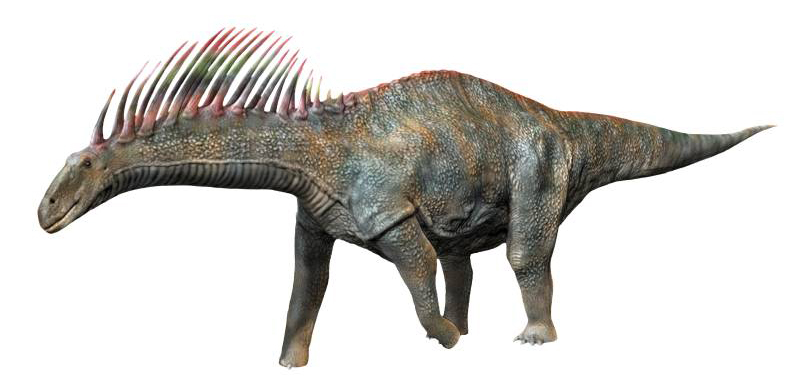
Life restoration of Amargasaurus without the proposed "cervical sail"

Jack Bailey, in 1997, argued that the spines resembled those of sail-bearing pelycosaurs like Dimetrodon. According to this author, Amargasaurus might also have possessed such a sail, which might have been used for display. Unlike those of pelycosaurs, the neural spines of Amargasaurus were bifurcated, forming a double row along the neck and back. As the space between both rows was merely 3 to 7 cm (1.2 to 2.8 inches), the existence of two parallel sails seems unlikely. Instead, Bailey suggested the spines represented a scaffold which was completely enveloped by a single skin. Neural spines from the penultimate dorsal vertebra to the foremost tail vertebrae also were strongly elongated, but different in structure, forming a single row of paddle-shaped projections. According to Bailey, these projections resembled those of modern humped ungulates such as the bison, indicating the presence of a fleshy hump above the hips. Bailey suggested similar humps for other dinosaurs with strongly elongated neural spines, such as Spinosaurus and Ouranosaurus.

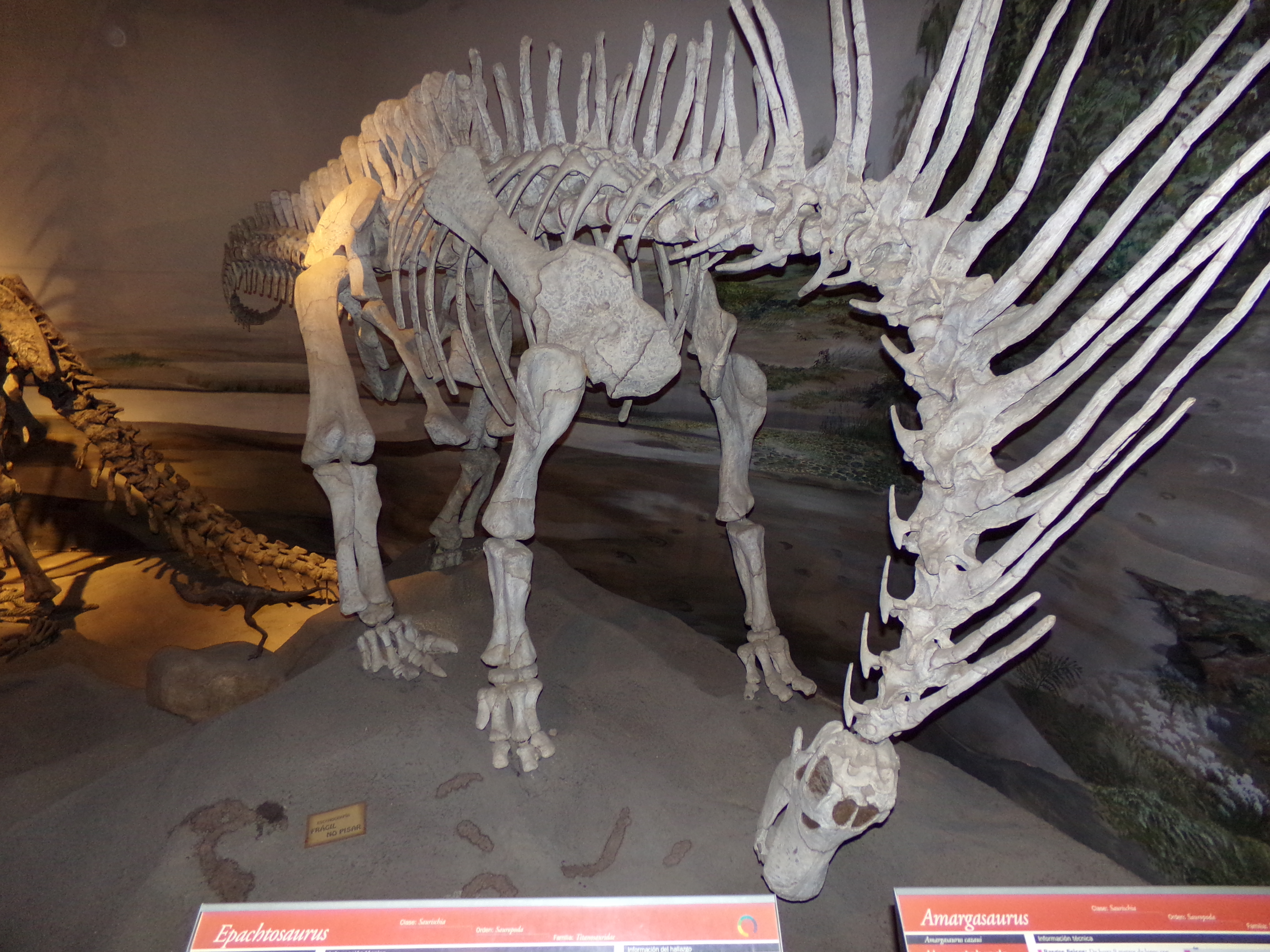
Skeleton cast showing the neck spikes pointing forwards during downwards bending, Museum of Paleontology Egidio Feruglio

Daniela Schwarz and colleagues, in 2007, concluded that the bifurcated neural spines of diplodocids and dicraeosaurids enclosed an air sac, which would have been connected to the lungs as part of the respiratory system. In Dicraeosaurus, this air sac (the so-called supravertebral diverticulum) would have rested on top of the neural arch and filled the entire space between the spines. In Amargasaurus the upper two-thirds of the spines would have been covered by a sheath of keratin, restricting the air sac to the space between the lower one-third of the spines. A cover of either keratin or skin is indicated striations on the surface of the spines similar to those of bony horn cores of today's bovids. In 2016, Mark Hallett and Mathew Wedel suggested that the backwards-directed spines might have been able to skewer predators when the neck was abruptly drawn backwards during an attack. A similar defense strategy is found in today's giant sable antelope and Arabian oryx, which can use their long, backwards directed horns to stab attacking lions. Apart from the possible function in defense, the spines may have been used for display, either for the intimidation of rivaling individuals or for courtship. Hallett and Wedel also hypothesized that rival males might have interlocked their spines for neck wrestling. Pablo Gallina and colleagues (2019) described the closely related Bajadasaurus, which had neural spines similar to those of Amargasaurus, and suggested that both genera employed them for defense. A defense function would have been especially effective in Bajadasaurus as the spines were directed forwards and would have reached past the tip of the snout, deterring predators. The keratinous sheath that likely covered the spines might have extended their length by 50%, as seen in some modern even-toed ungulates. Such extended sheaths would have made the delicate spines more resistant to damage—likely a critical threat, as the bases of the spines form the roof of the spinal cord.

In 2022, a study by Ignacio Cerda and colleagues analyzing the external and internal bone structure of the spines of Amargasaurus and an indeterminate dicraeosaurid (also from the La Amarga Formation) suggested that the spines did not support a keratinous sheath as previously believed. Instead, the distribution and orientation of Sharpey's fibers indicates the presence of ligaments that likely extended between successive spines. The spines are also highly vascularized and bear cyclical growth marks. The authors argued that these features are consistent with the possible presence of a neck sail. Such a sail could have been used for display, possibly for sexual display or to deter rivals.

=== Senses, posture, and feeding ===
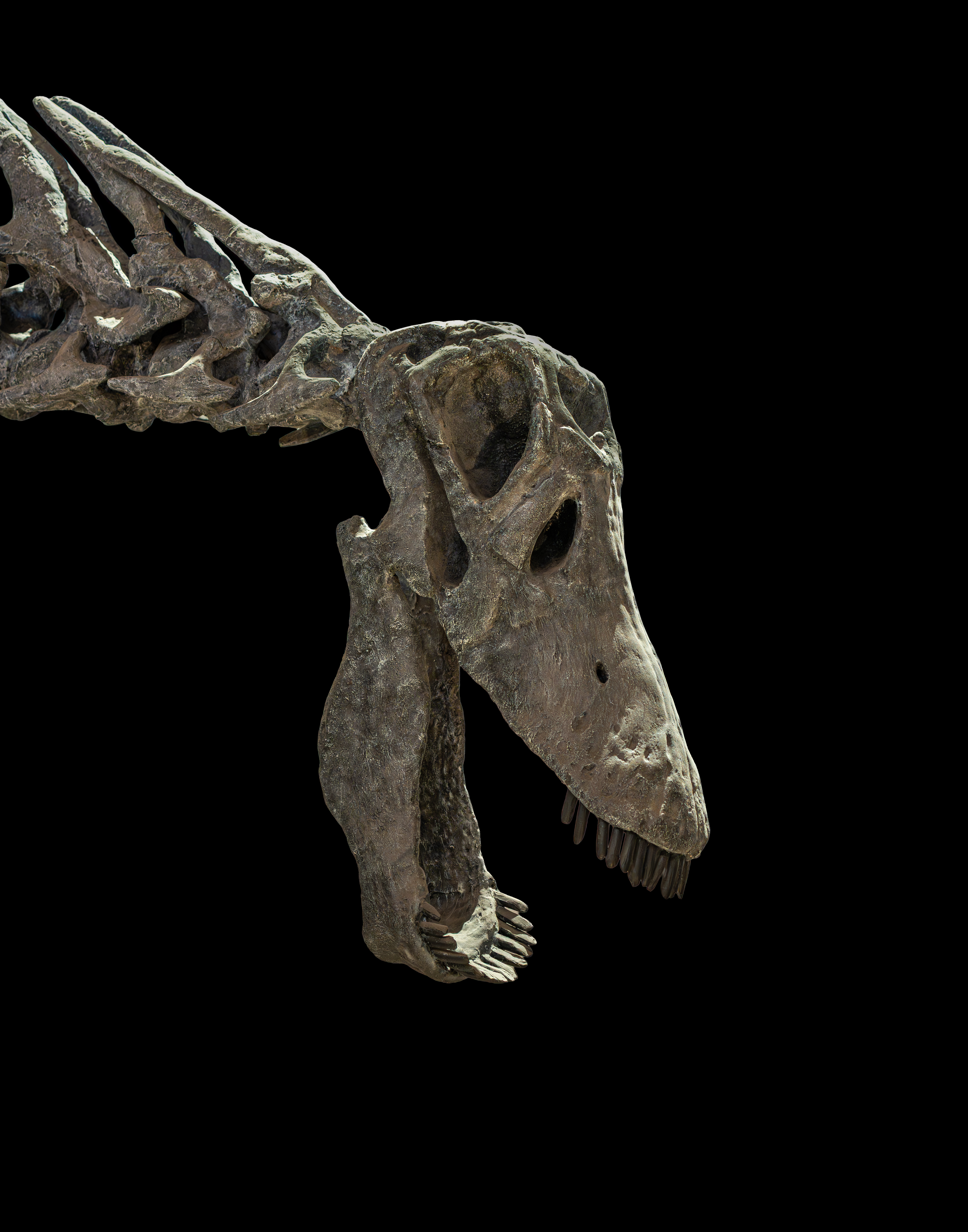
Reconstructed skull in sloping posture, Museo Nacional de Historia Natural de Chile

Paulina Carabajal and colleagues, in 2014, CT-scanned the skull, allowing for the generation of three-dimensional models of both the cranial endocast (the cast of the brain cavity) and the inner ear. Using these models, the cranial endocast was shown to encompass 94 to 98 milliliters (0.20 to 0.21 U.S. pints) in volume. The inner ear was 30 millimeters (1.2 inches) tall and 22 mm (0.87 inches) wide. The lagena, the part containing the hair cells for hearing, was rather short, indicating that the sense of hearing would have been poorer in Amargasaurus than in other sauropods for which inner ears have been studied.

The first skeletal reconstructions show the skull in a near-horizontal posture. Salgado, in 1999, argued that such a posture would have been anatomically impossible due to the elongated neural spines of the neck vertebrae. Instead, he envisaged the head in a nearly vertical orientation. The habitual orientation of the head is usually reflected by the orientation of the semicircular canals of the inner ear, which housed the sense of balance (vestibular system). Using their three-dimensional model of the inner ear, Carabajal and colleagues suggested that the snout faced downwards at an angle of roughly 65° relative to the horizontal. A similar value has recently been proposed for the related Diplodocus. The neutral posture of the neck can be approximated based on how the cervical vertebrae attached to each other. According to Carabajal and colleagues, the neck was gently sloping downwards, so that the snout would have rested 80 cm (2.6 ft) above the ground in neutral posture. In reality, neck posture would have varied according to the respective activities of the animals. Raising of the neck, e.g. for reaching an alert position, would have been constricted by the elongated neural spines, not permitting heights greater than 270 cm (8.9 ft).

In a 2025 study, Mariano Militello and colleagues reconstructed the neck musculature that would have attached to the head. The paroccipital processes on the top rear corners of the skull were large, providing large attachment surfaces for neck muscles that moved the head sidewards. The basal tubera on the rear surface of the braincase were also large, indicating that the muscles that pulled the head downwards were also relatively powerful. These features indicate an increased head mobility and an ability to graze or uproot vegetation, which would have been helpful when feeding low above the ground. The neck would have allowed the animal to feed over a large area without moving the body. Another genus, Giraffatitan, would instead have had an erect neck adapted for browing at great heights, at the cost of a smaller feeding area.

=== Locomotion ===
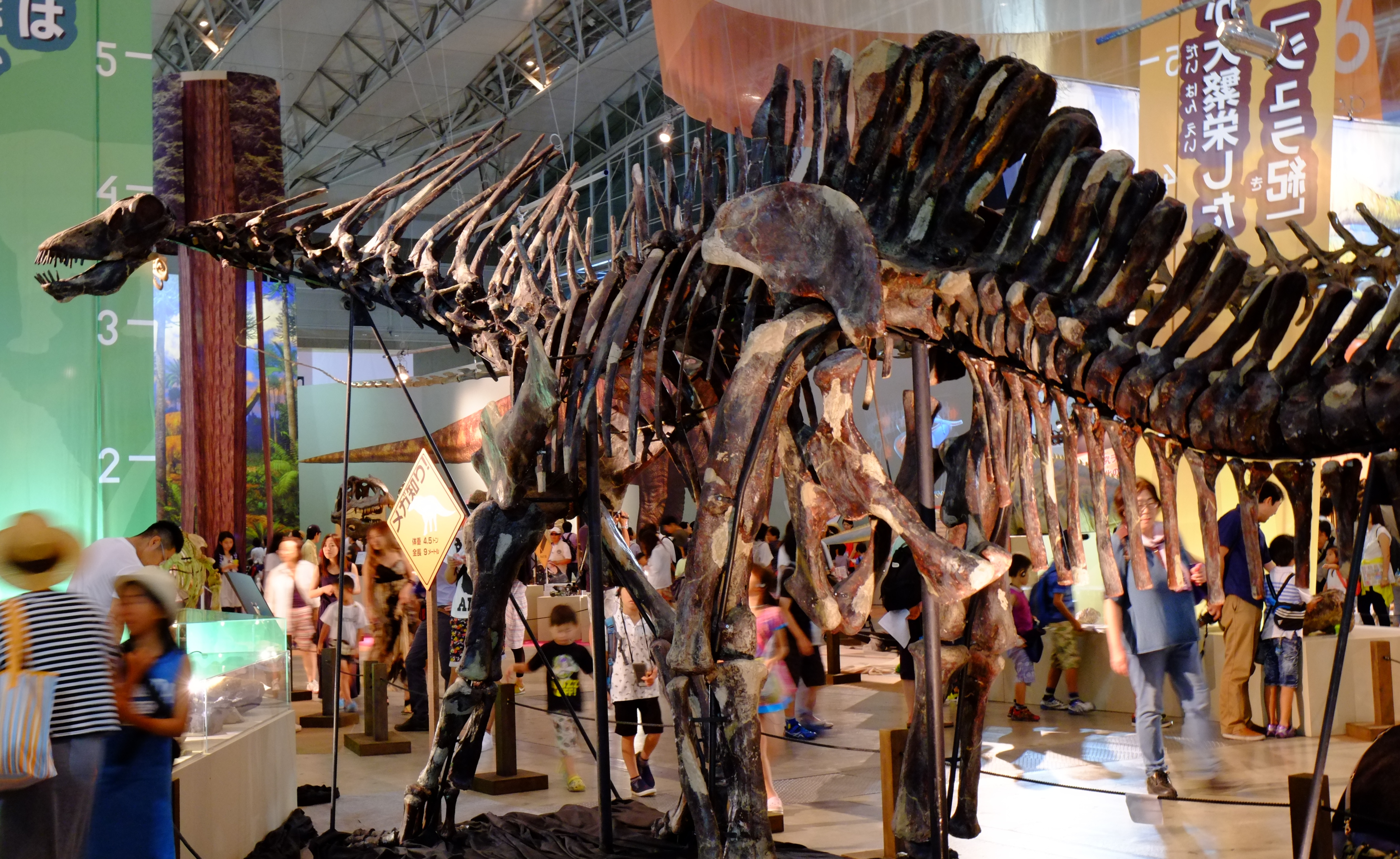
Hind view of skeleton, showing the pelvis and tall sacral spines

Amargasaurus was quadrupedal (moved on four legs), and probably was unable to rear on its hind legs. Salgado and Bonaparte, in 1991, suggested that Amargasaurus was a slow walker, as both the forearms and lower legs were proportionally short, as a feature common to slow-moving animals. This was contradicted by Gerardo Mazzetta and Richard Fariña in 1999, who argued that Amargasaurus was capable of rapid locomotion. During locomotion, leg bones are strongly affected by bending moments, representing a limiting factor for the maximum speed of an animal. The leg bones of Amargasaurus were even more sturdy than those of today's white rhinoceros, which is adapted to galloping.

=== Life history ===
In a 2021 study, Guillermo Windholz and Ignacio Cerda obtained thin sections of the humerus, femur, and a rib of the Amargasaurus specimen in order to determine the number and spacing of lines of arrested growth (analogous to the growth rings of a tree). The rib showed the most complete record of lines of arrested growth, indicating that the Amargasaurus holotype individual was at least ten years old. In sauropodomorphs, sexual maturity occurred long before adult size was reached. In the outer cortex (the most external layer of the bone when seen in cross section) of the Amargasaurus individual, lines of arrested growth are more abundant, indicating sexual maturity. However, an external fundamental system (a layer containing very closely spaced lines of arrested growth) is missing, possibly indicating that the individual was not yet fully grown, although it cannot be excluded that the external fundamental system was originally present but has since been eroded.

== Paleoecology ==
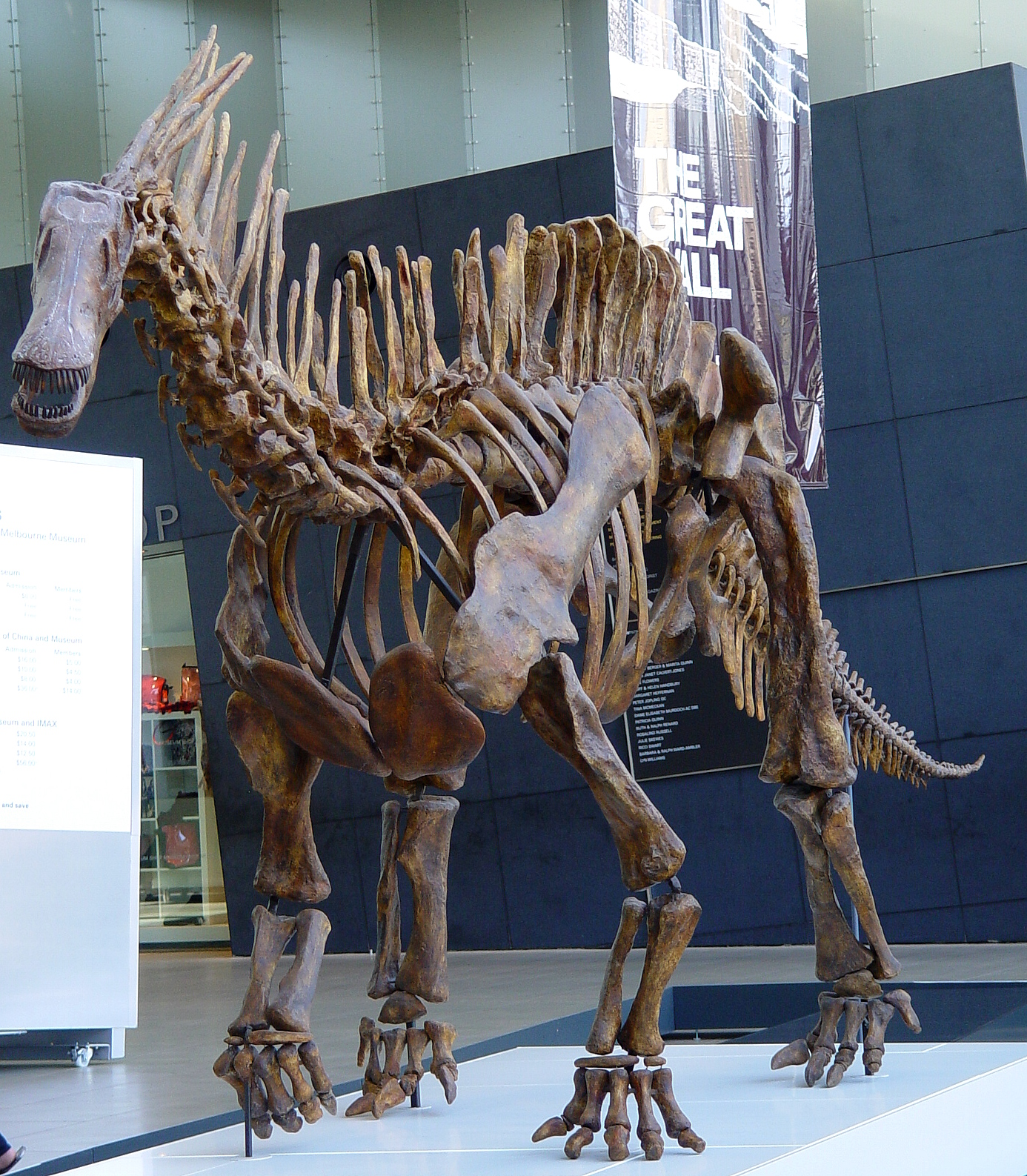
Skeleton cast in the Melbourne Museum foyer

Amargasaurus stems from sedimentary rocks of the La Amarga Formation, which is part of the Neuquén Basin and dates to the Barremian and late Aptian of the Early Cretaceous. Most vertebrate fossils, including Amargasaurus, have been found in the lowermost (oldest) part of the formation, the Puesto Antigual Member. This member is approximately 29 meters (95 ft) in thickness and mainly composed of sandstones deposited by braided rivers. The Amargasaurus skeleton itself was recovered from a layer composed of sandy conglomerates. The sauropod fauna of the La Amarga Formation was diverse and included the basal rebbachisaurid Zapalasaurus, the dicraeosaurid Amargatitanis, and unnamed remains of basal titanosauriforms. The region was likely dominated by well-flowing coastal forests with a short dry season. The high diversity suggests that different sauropod species exploited different food sources in order to reduce competition. Basal Titanosauriforms showed proportionally longer necks, longer forelimbs, and broader tooth crowns than Dicraeosaurids and Rebbachisaurids, suggesting greater feeding heights. Amargasaurus probably fed above ground level at heights of up to 2.7 meters (8.9 ft), as evidenced by the anatomy of its neck and inner ear. Rebbachisaurids like Zapalasaurus presumably fed at ground-level, while basal Titanosauriforms exploited food sources at higher levels.

Other dinosaurs of the La Amarga Formation include an indeterminate stegosaur; predatory dinosaurs include the small ceratosaur Ligabueino, and the presence of a large tetanuran is indicated by teeth. Other than dinosaurs, the formation is notable for the cladotherian mammal Vincelestes, the only mammal known from the Early Cretaceous of South America. Crocodylomorphs are represented by the trematochampsid Amargasuchus – the holotype of this genus was found in association with the Amargasaurus bones.
