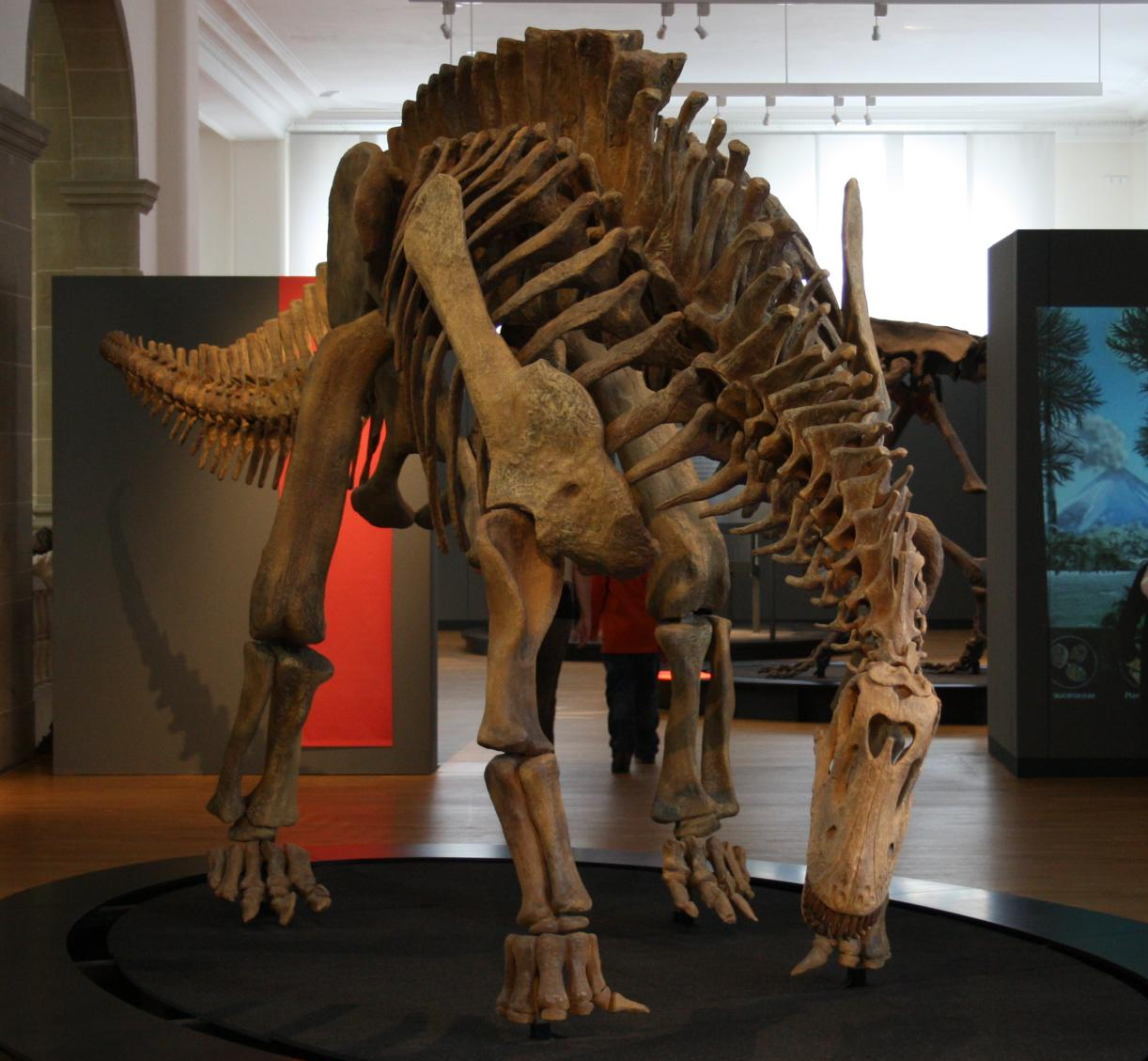
- Restored skeleton

Scientific classification
- Kingdom: Animalia
- Phylum: Chordata
- Class: Reptilia
- Clade: Dinosauria
- Clade: Saurischia
- Clade: †Sauropodomorpha
- Clade: †Sauropoda
- Clade: †Eusauropoda
- Superfamily: †Diplodocoidea
- Family: †Dicraeosauridae
- Genus: †Brachytrachelopan; Rauhut et al. 2005
- Species: †B. mesai

Binomial name
- †Brachytrachelopan mesai Rauhut et al. 2005

= Brachytrachelopan =

Brachytrachelopan Temporal range: Late Jurassic (Oxfordian-Tithonian) ~160–150 Ma

Extinct genus of dinosaurs

Brachytrachelopan is a genus of short-necked sauropod dinosaur from the Late Jurassic (Oxfordian to Tithonian) of Argentina. The holotype and only known specimen ( Mamenchisaurus MPEF-PV 1716) was collected from an erosional exposure of fluvial sandstone within the Cañadón Calcáreo Formation on a hill approximately 25 kilometres (16 mi) north-northeast of Cerro Cóndor, Chubut Province, in west-central Argentina, South America. Though very incomplete, the skeletal elements recovered were found in articulation and include eight cervical, twelve dorsal, and three sacral vertebrae, as well as proximal portions of the posterior cervical ribs and all the dorsal ribs, the distal end of the left femur, the proximal end of the left tibia, and the right ilium. Much of the specimen was probably lost to erosion many years before its discovery. The type species is Brachytrachelopan mesai. The specific name honours Daniel Mesa, a local shepherd who discovered the specimen while searching for lost sheep. The genus name translates as "short-necked Pan", Pan being the god of the shepherds.

== Description ==
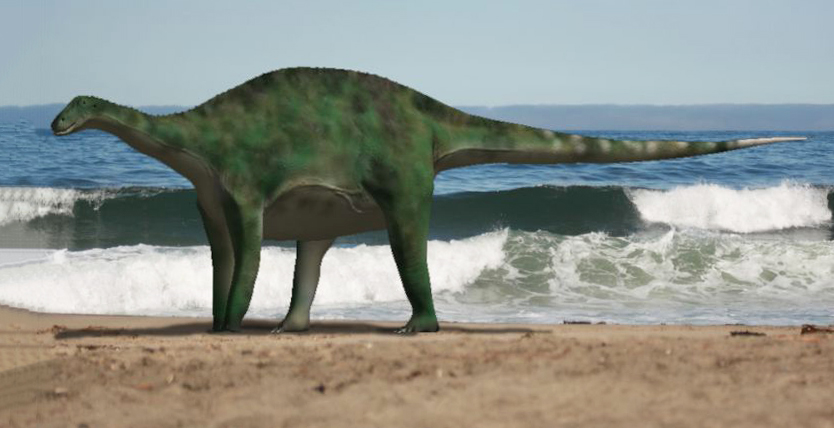
Life restoration of Brachytrachelopan mesai

Size comparison of the Dicraeosauridae members. Brachytrachelopan is orange.

This taxon's very short neck (approximately 40% shorter than other dicraeosaurids and the shortest of any known sauropod) is evidence that this lineage specialized to fill an ecological niche not exploited by other members of this infraorder. Small for a sauropod, Brachytrachelopan measured 10–11 metres (33–36 ft) in length and 5 metric tons (5.5 short tons) in body mass. Rauhut et al. (2005, 670) note that the high degree of fusion present between the preserved neural arches and their respective centra, as well as fusion between the sacral centra, sacral neural arches, and sacral neural spines is evidence that the holotype does not represent a juvenile animal. Hence, the small body size is not a relic of ontogeny.

=== Distinguishing characteristics ===
Rauhut et al. (2005, 670) diagnose Brachytrachelopan as differing from all other sauropods in the following respects: "...individual cervical vertebrae being as long as, or shorter in anteroposterior length than, high posteriorly. Further apomorphies...include a pronounced, pillar-like centropostzygapophyseal lamina in the cervical vertebrae, a pronounced anterior inclination in the mid-cervical neural spines, with the tip of the spine extending beyond the anterior end of the centrum, and anterior dorsal neural spines one to six with vertical bases and anteriorly flexed tips."

== Classification ==
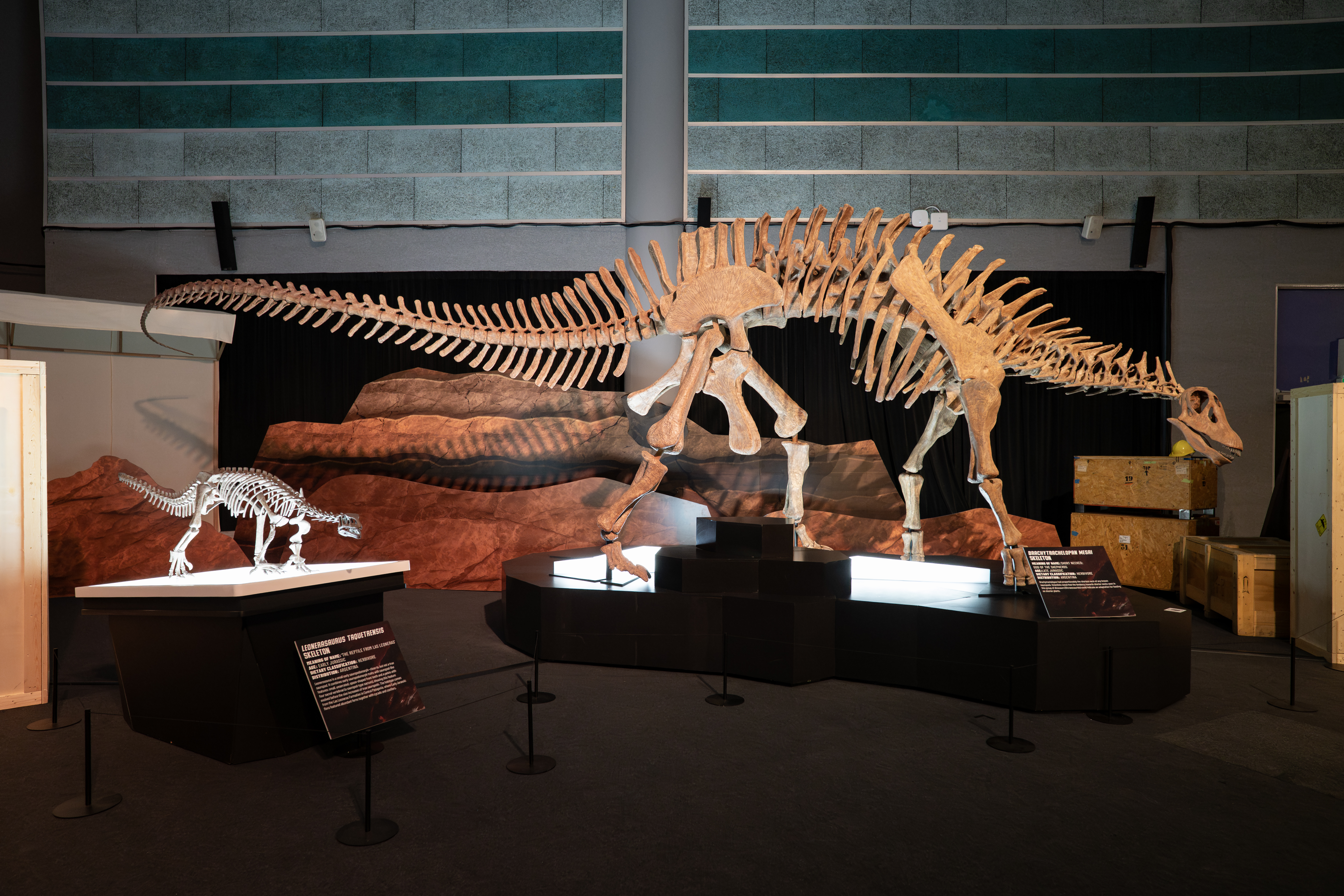
Skeleton of Brachytrachelopan on display along with Leonerasaurus (at the background) at Science Centre Singapore

Brachytrachelopan belongs to Sauropoda and Neosauropoda from the group of Diplodocoidea and family Dicraeosauridae.

Following a cladistic analysis of 27 sauropod taxa and 154 anatomical characters, Rauhut et al. (2005, 671-672; Fig. 2) assigned Brachytrachelopan to the Dicraeosauridae, proposing that, within this clade, it should be considered to have a sister group relationship to the Late Jurassic African taxon Dicraeosaurus, instead of to Amargasaurus from the Lower Cretaceous of South America. Rauhut et al. (2005, 671) conclude this is indicative of a rapid evolutionary radiation and dispersal of the Dicraeosauridae following the separation of the continents of the Southern and Northern Hemispheres during the latest Middle Jurassic.

The following cladogram by Tschopp and colleagues (2015) shows the presumed relationships between members of the Dicraeosauridae:

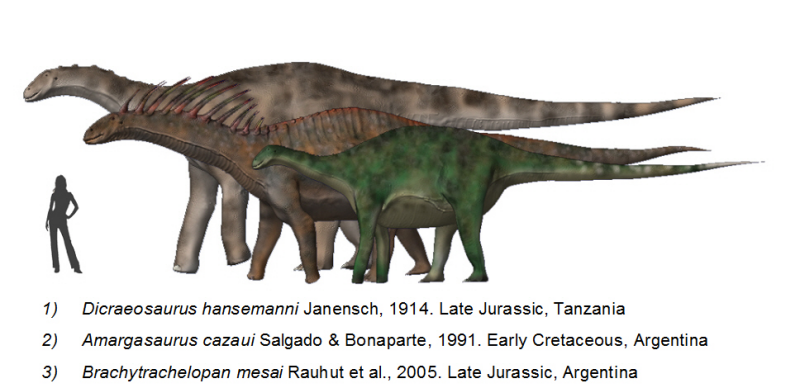
Size comparison of Brachytrachelopan, Amargasaurus, Dicraeosaurus and a human

- Dicraeosauridae
  - Dyslocosaurus polyonychius
  - - - Suuwassea emilieae
      - Dystrophaeus viaemalae
    - - Brachytrachelopan mesai
      - - Amargasaurus cazaui
        - Dicraeosaurus hansemanni

== Paleoecology ==
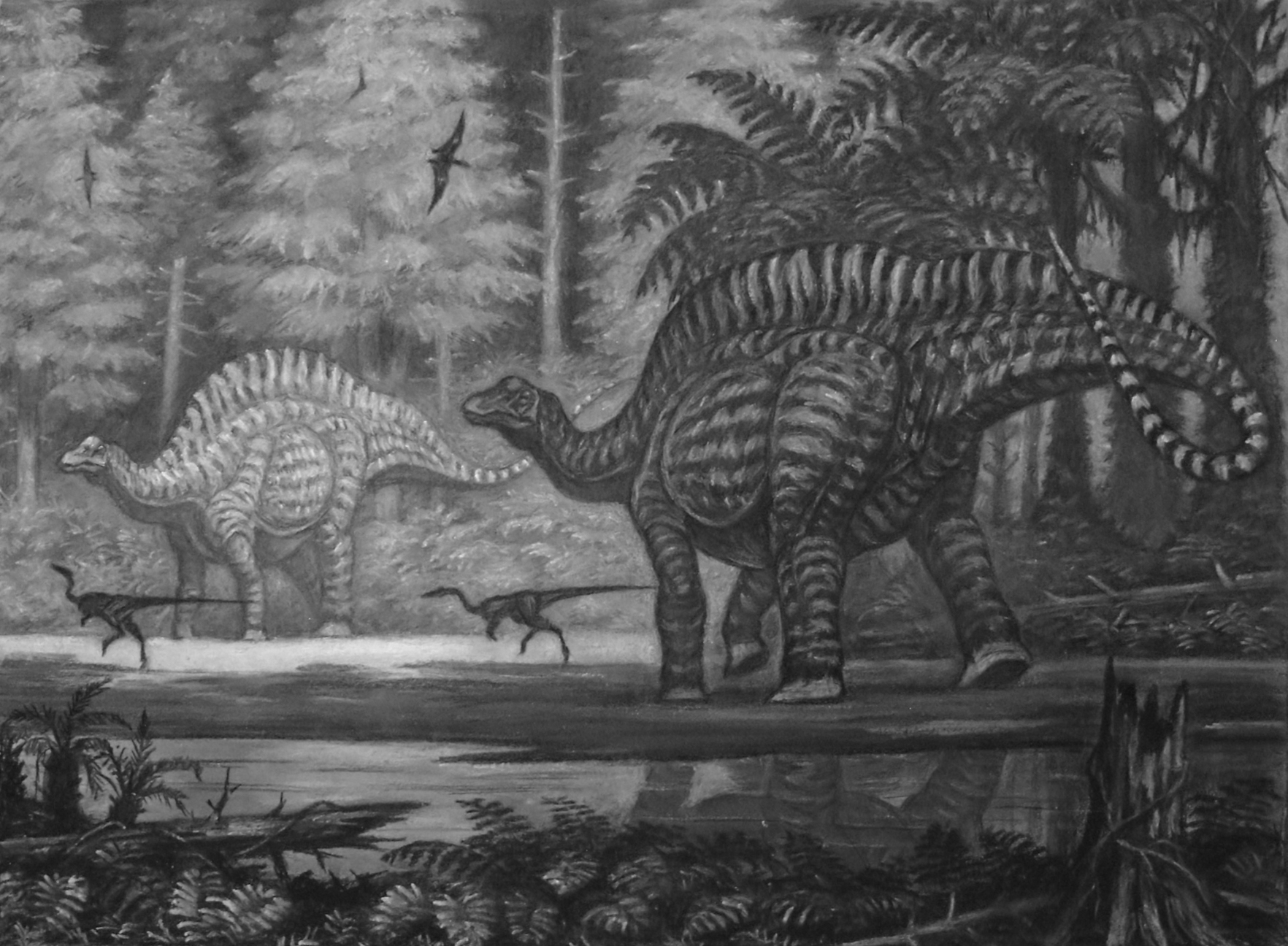
Restoration of a pair

Rauhut and colleagues in 2005 noted that the tendency towards shorter-necks seen in dicraeosaurids, and most evident in Brachytrachelopan, runs counter to the lengthening of the neck seen in most sauropod lineages (brachiosaurids, titanosaurs, diplodocids, etc.) and indicates that this group of sauropods was "progressively adapting for low browsing and might have been specialized on specific food sources, as has been suggested for Amargasaurus and Dicraeosaurus." Moreover, the morphology of the cervical neural arches in Brachytrachelopan would have significantly restricted dorsal flexion of the neck and most likely indicates that this sauropod was specialized to a diet of plants "growing at heights of between about 1 and 2 m." Rauhut and colleagues also suggested that diet may have been a limiting factor in body size among dicraeosaurids, and that this may have placed them in the same ecological niche as "large low-browsing iguanodontian ornithopods." Such large iguanodontians are absent from the Late Jurassic Gondwanan sediments that have produced all known fossils of dicraeosaurids, while they are abundant in similar ecosystems of the same age in North America, where dicraeosaurids are absent. This may indicate that large iguanodontians and dicraeosaurids (especially Brachytrachelopan) were ecological analogs, resulting from parallel evolution in two distantly related dinosaurian lineages.
