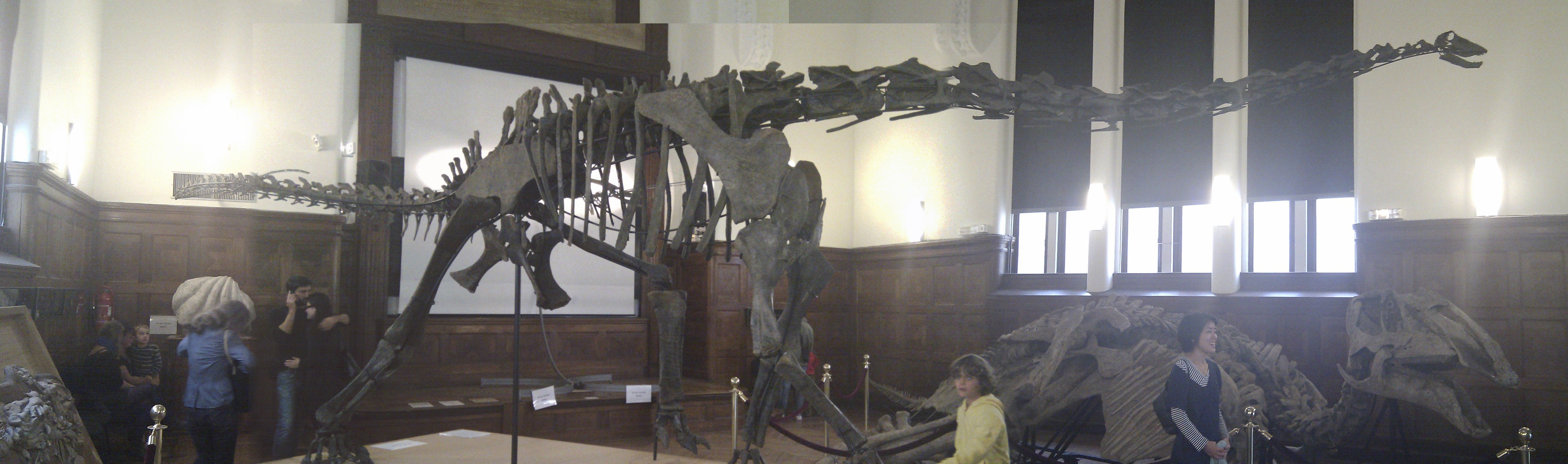
- Restored skeleton, Paris

Scientific classification
- Kingdom: Animalia
- Phylum: Chordata
- Class: Reptilia
- Clade: Dinosauria
- Clade: Saurischia
- Clade: †Sauropodomorpha
- Clade: †Sauropoda
- Clade: †Eusauropoda
- Superfamily: †Diplodocoidea
- Family: †Dicraeosauridae
- Genus: †Suuwassea; Harris & Dodson, 2004
- Species: †S. emilieae

Binomial name
- †Suuwassea emilieae Harris & Dodson, 2004

= Suuwassea =

Suuwassea Temporal range: Late Jurassic, 156.3–146.8 Ma

Extinct genus of dinosaurs

Suuwassea is a genus of dicraeosaurid sauropod dinosaur found in Upper Jurassic strata of the Morrison Formation, located in southern Carbon County, Montana, United States. The fossil remains were recovered in a series of expeditions during a period spanning the years 1999 and 2000 and were described by J.D. Harris and Peter Dodson in 2004. They consist of a disarticulated but associated partial skeleton, including partial vertebral series and limb bones.

== Etymology ==
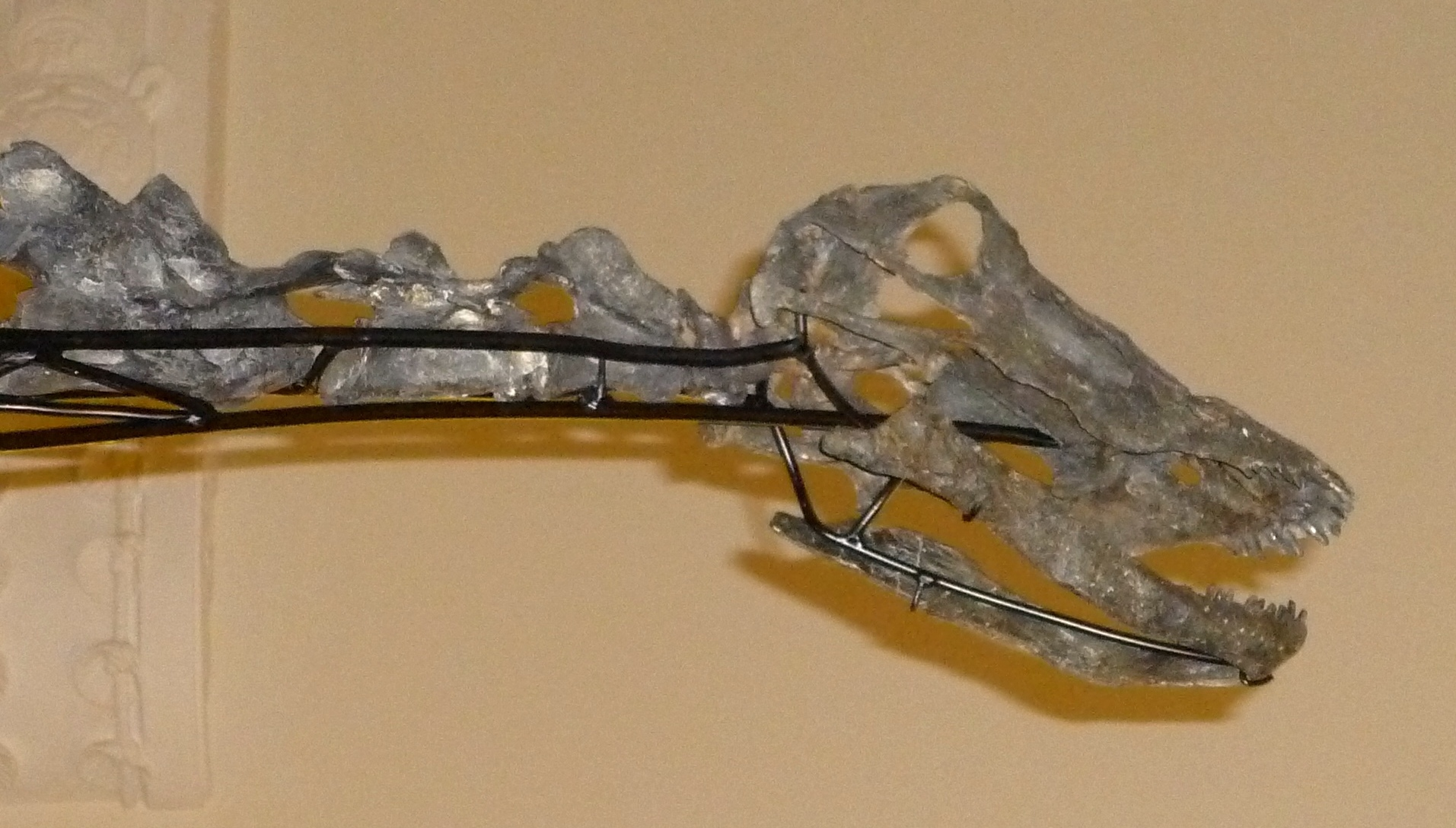
Skull

Since the fossil was found in an ancestral territory of the Native American Crow tribe, the etymology of the generic name is derived from a term in their language, suuwassa, “the first thunder heard in spring”. The root suu, meaning “thunder” and wassa, “ancient”, are a nod to the “thunder lizard” moniker often applied to sauropods. The specific descriptor honours the deceased sponsor of the expeditions that recovered the fossil, Emilie deHellebranth (1914–2001).

== Description ==
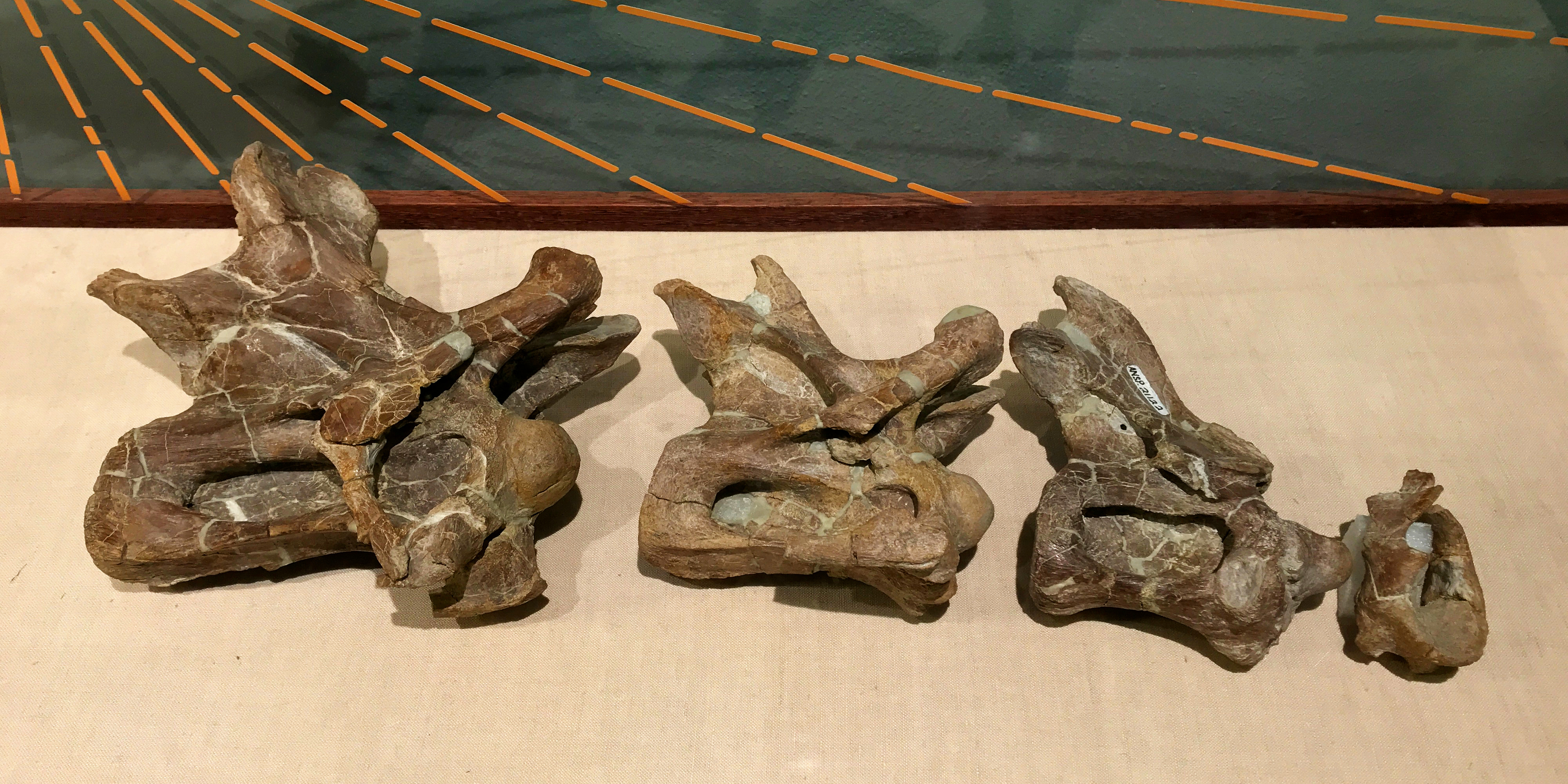
Fifth and third to first cervical vertebrae

Suuwassea is a dicraeosaurid, estimated to have reached 15 meters (49 ft) in length and 5 metric tons (5.5 short tons) in body mass, characterized by skull and axial skeleton features it shares with Diplodocidae and Dicraeosauridae though it is too primitive to pertain to any of the latter clades. The herbivore differs from dicraeosaurids in the unfused state of the frontal, and from diplodocids in the arrangement of bones around the foramen magnum, though it possesses a greater number of similarities with the latter than with clade Dicraeosauridae.

== Classification ==
Skeletal reconstruction

Fossils in the Academy of Natural Sciences of Philadelphia

In the original description, Suuwassea was placed at Flagellicaudata incertae sedis due to the mosaic of primitive and derived characters found in both dicraeosaurids and diplodocids. Later phylogenetic analysis placed it as a member of the diplodocid subfamily Apatosaurinae, but subsequent studies recovered it as a North American member of Dicraeosauridae.

A cladogram showing Suuwassea among other Dicraeosauridae, according to Tschopp et al., 2015:

- - Dicraeosauridae
    - Dyslocosaurus polyonychius
    - - - Suuwassea emilieae
        - Dystrophaeus viaemalae
      - - Brachytrachelopan mesai
        - - Amargasaurus cazaui
          - Dicraeosaurus hansemanni
