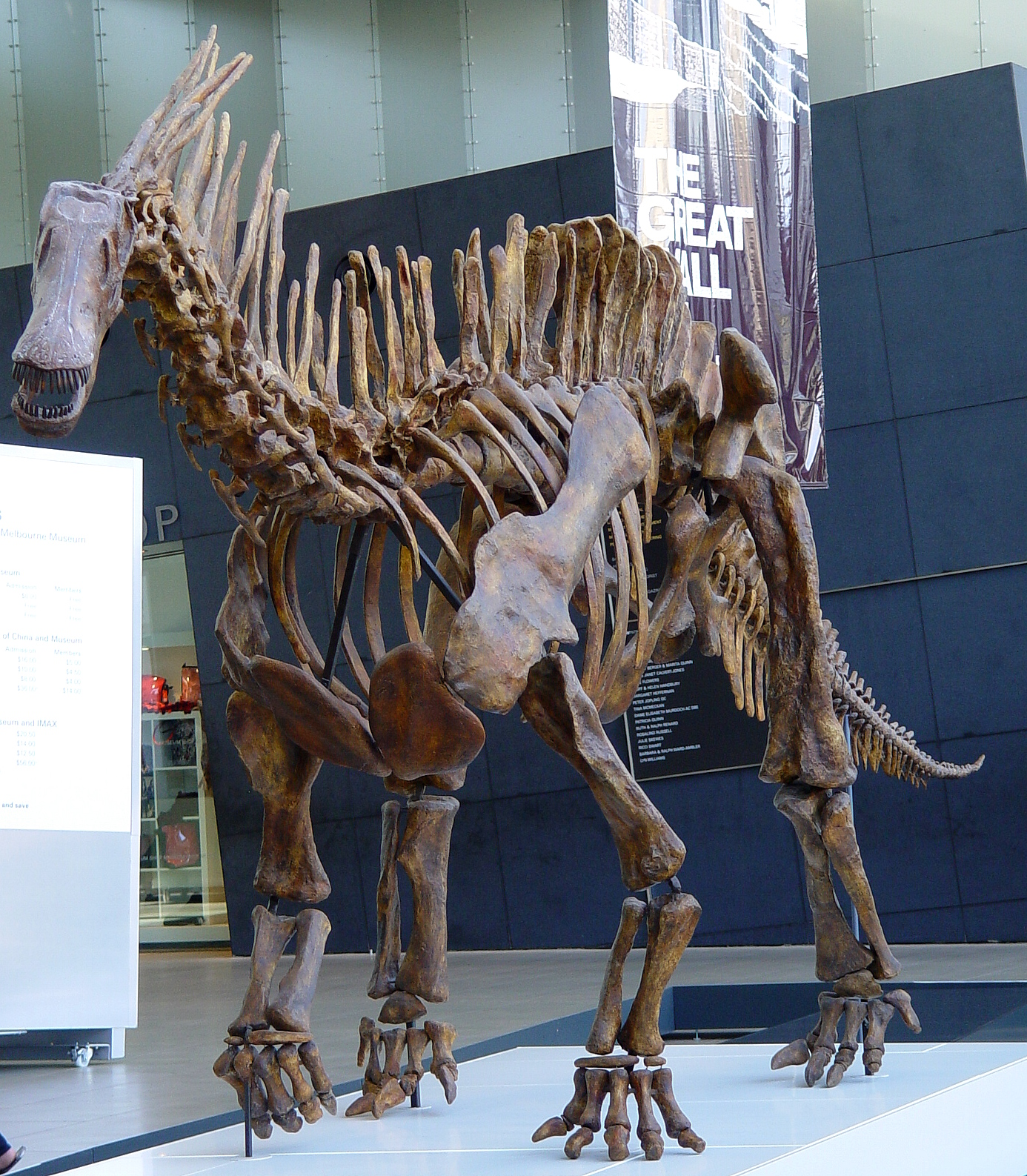
- Amargasaurus

Scientific classification
- Kingdom: Animalia
- Phylum: Chordata
- Class: Reptilia
- Clade: Dinosauria
- Clade: Saurischia
- Clade: †Sauropodomorpha
- Clade: †Sauropoda
- Superfamily: †Diplodocoidea
- Clade: †Flagellicaudata
- Family: †Dicraeosauridae; Janensch, 1929

Genera
- †Amargasaurus; †Amargatitanis; †Athenar; †Bajadasaurus; †Brachytrachelopan; †Dicraeosaurus; †Dyslocosaurus; †Kaatedocus?; †Lingwulong?; †Pilmatueia; †Smitanosaurus; †Suuwassea; †Tharosaurus?

= Dicraeosauridae =

Dicraeosaurids Temporal range: Middle Jurassic - Early Cretaceous, 166–122 Ma

Extinct family of dinosaurs

Dicraeosauridae is a family of diplodocoid sauropods that are the sister group to Diplodocidae. Dicraeosaurids are a part of the Flagellicaudata, along with Diplodocidae. Dicraeosauridae includes genera such as Amargasaurus, Suuwassea, Dicraeosaurus, and Brachytrachelopan. Definitive genera of this family have been found in North America, Africa, and South America. The Asian taxa Lingwulong and Tharosaurus have been suggested to be dicraeosaurids, but some authors disagree with this classification. Dicraeosaurids were alive from the Early or Middle Jurassic to the Early Cretaceous. A few dicraeosaurids survived into the Cretaceous, the youngest of which was Amargasaurus.

The group was first described by German paleontologist Werner Janensch in 1914 with the discovery of Dicraeosaurus in Tanzania. Dicraeosauridae are distinct from other sauropods because of their relatively short neck size and small body size.

The clade is monophyletic and well-supported phylogenetically with thirteen unambiguous synapomorphies uniting it. They diverged from Diplodocidae in the Mid-Jurassic, as evidenced by the diversity of dicraeosaurids in both South America and East Africa when Gondwana was still united by land. However, there is some disagreement among paleontologists on the phylogenetic placement of Suuwassea, the only genus of the Dicraeosauridae to be found in North America. It has been characterized as a basal dicraeosaurid by some and a member of the Diplodocidae by others. The placement of Suuwassea within Dicraeosauridae or Diplodocidae has substantial biogeographic implications for the evolution of Dicraeosauridae.

== Classification ==
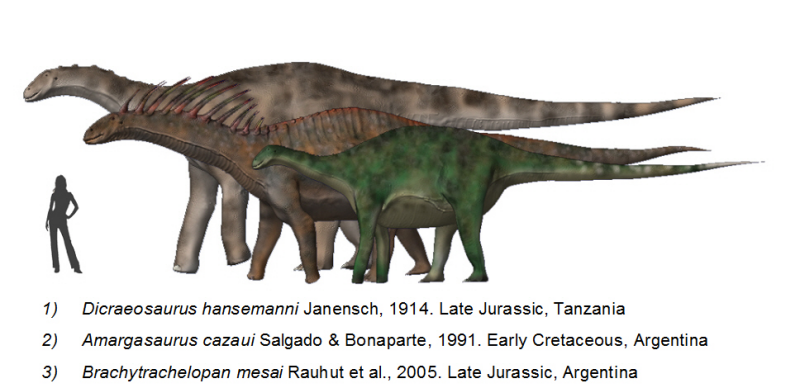
Dicraeosaurids, drawn to scale.

Dicraeosaurids are a part of Diplodocoidea and are the sister group to Diploidocidae. In the past two decades, the known diversity of the group has doubled. However, the classification of Suuwassea as a dicraeosaurid is not universally agreed upon. Some phylogenetic analyses have found Suuwassea to be a basal diplodocoid instead of a dicraeosaurid. One 2015 analysis has even found Dyslocosaurus as a member of Dicraeosauridae. A 2016 reappraisal of Amargatitanis has placed it into the Dicraeosauridae, as well. In 2018 a new genus, Pilmatueia, was described.

Size comparison of the most complete members of the sauropod family Dicraeosauridae

Dicraeosaurids are differentiated from their sister group, diplodocids, and from most sauropods by their relatively small body size and short necks. Dicraeosaurids are advanced sauropods within the monophyletic clade Neosauropoda, which is generally characterized by gigantism. The relatively small body size of dicraeosaurids make them an important outlier relative to other taxa in Neosauropoda.

== Phylogeny ==
There have been several different proposed phylogenies of Dicraeosauridae and the intra-group cladistics are not resolved. Suuwassea is variably positioned as either a basal dicraeosaurid or a basal diplodocoid. The phylogeny published by Tschopp and colleagues in 2015 is as follows:

- - Dicraeosauridae
    - Dyslocosaurus polyonychius
    - - - Suuwassea emilieae
        - Dystrophaeus viaemalae
      - - Brachytrachelopan mesai
        - - Amargasaurus cazaui
          - Dicraeosaurus hansemanni

Tschopp includes Dyslocosaurus and Dystrophaeus as dicraeosaurids, two genera traditionally not considered to be part of Dicraeosauridae. The specimens of Dystrophaeus viamelae are highly fragmentary, with only a few bones available for study including an ulna, partial scapula, partial dorsal vertebrae, a distal radius, and some metacarpals. Dyslocosaurus polyonychius also has extremely limited fossil evidence that only includes appendicular elements, and the position of it in Tschopp's phylogeny is therefore considered "preliminary".

Several studies, however, do not include even Suuwassea in Dicraeosauridae, such as Sereno et al. (2007); and JD Harris (2006). Other studies, however, recover Suuwassea as a basal dicraeosaurid, including Whitlock (2010) and Salgado et al. (2006).

== Paleobiology ==
=== Feeding behavior ===
As sauropods, dicraeosaurids are obligate herbivores. Due to their relatively small necks and skull shape, it has been deduced that dicraeosaurids and diplodocids primarily browsed close to the ground or at mid height. Among the dicraeosaurids, only Dicraeosaurus has well-preserved dentition. This makes it difficult for paleontologists to make definitive statements about Dicraeosauridae feeding behavior compared to diplodocid feeding behavior. However, compared to its known relatives, Dicraeosaurus is unique in that it has an equal number of teeth in the upper and lower jaw, though teeth in the lower jaw are replaced more slowly.

=== Anatomy ===
Dicraeosaurids are characterized by their relatively small body size, short necks, and long neural spines. They are 10–13 meters in body length. They share thirteen unambiguous synapomorphies including dorsal vertebrae without pleurocoels, the presence of a ventrally directed prong on the squamosal, and a subtriangular-shaped dentary symphysis.

== Distribution and evolution ==
Early Dicraeosaurid specimens have been found in three continents - Africa, South America, and North America. The distribution of species is primarily Gondwonan, with the exception of the North American Suuwassea. The presence of Suuwassea in North America is unique among dicraeosaurids, therefore making the proper taxonomic classification of Suuwassea essential. The group likely first diverged from the diplodocids in the middle Jurassic in North America and subsequently dispersed into Gondwana, with the most diversity in East Africa and South America. Amargasaurus was the latest surviving dicraeosaurid genus, living into the Early Cretaceous period.

Recently from the Thar Desert, a dicraeosaurid fossil dating back to 167 million years ago was discovered in 2023. This present-day sweltering expanse of India was a lush green tropical coastline that bordered the Tethys Ocean, serving as a habitat for a diverse range of dinosaurs during the Mesozoic Era. This discovery marks the first of its kind to be unearthed in Asian continent and is also the oldest specimen ever recorded in the global fossil record.
