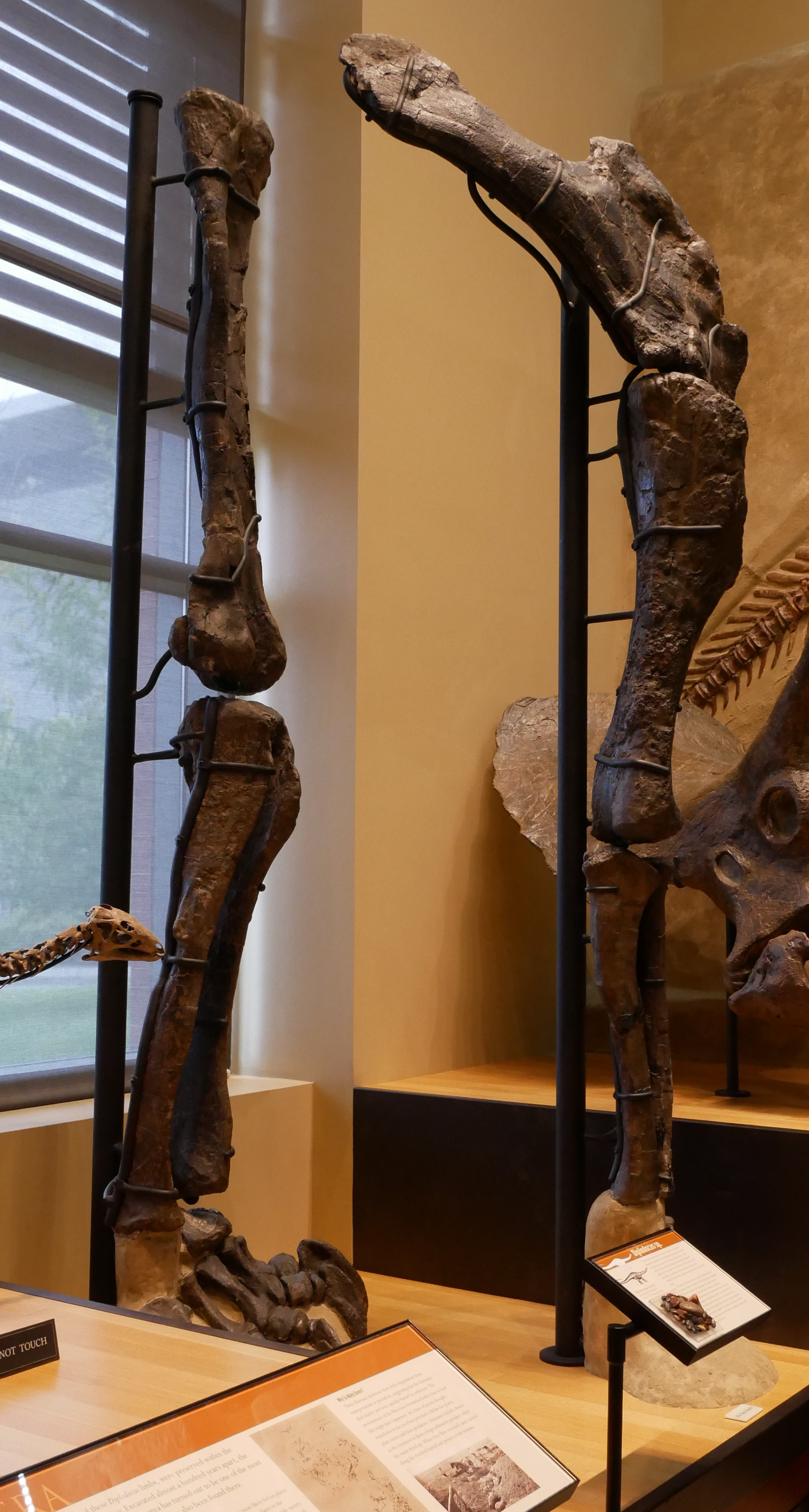
- Holotype specimen

Scientific classification
- Kingdom: Animalia
- Phylum: Chordata
- Class: Reptilia
- Clade: Dinosauria
- Clade: Saurischia
- Clade: †Sauropodomorpha
- Clade: †Sauropoda
- Superfamily: †Diplodocoidea
- Family: †Dicraeosauridae
- Genus: †Dyslocosaurus
- Species: †D. polyonychius

Binomial name
- †Dyslocosaurus polyonychius McIntosh, Coombs, and Russell, 1992

= Dyslocosaurus =

Dyslocosaurus Temporal range: Late Jurassic, Kimmeridgian Possibly from the Maastrichtian

Extinct genus of dinosaurs

Dyslocosaurus (meaning "hard-to-place lizard") a genus of sauropod dinosaur from the Late Jurassic Period of Wyoming, North America. The holotype or type specimen the genus is based on, AC 663, is part of the collection of the Amherst College Museum of Natural History. It was collected by professor Frederic Brewster Loomis. However, the only available information regarding its provenance is that given on the label: "Lance Creek", a county in east Wyoming. Loomis himself thought that it stemmed from the Lance Formation, dating from the Late Cretaceous (Maastrichtian).

== Discovery and naming ==
In 1963 the specimen was brought to the attention of John Stanton McIntosh, who in 1992, together with William Coombs and Dale Russell, decided to create a new genus and species for it. The type species is Dyslocosaurus polyonychius. The genus name is derived from Greek dys, "bad, "poor", and Latin locus, "place", a reference to the paucity of data regarding the type locality of the fossil. The specific name is derived from Greek polys, "many", and onyx, "claw". The describers interpreted the remains, consisting of some limb bones, as those of a diplodocid dinosaur. From this they concluded that it in fact dated from the Late Jurassic Period, like most diplodocids. The species would then be unique in having four, or perhaps five, claws on the foot, whereas other diplodocids have only three — hence the specific name. A species similar to Dyslocosaurus would have made the tracks of the ichnospecies Brontopodus birdi from the Early Cretaceous, that also features four claws.

In 1998 Paul Sereno and Jeffrey A. Wilson gave an alternative interpretation: the specimen would come from the Lance Formation after all but be a chimera: in this case a mix up of titanosaur limb bones and theropod phalanges.

In their taxonomic revision of Diplodocidae, Tschopp et al. in 2015 noted that a pedal phalanx included in AC 663 is apparently not from the same individual as the rest of AC 663 given differences in preservation and coloration among individual bones, raising doubts on whether Dyslocosaurus had more than three claws on the feet. Although fragmentary, Dyslocosaurus was recovered as a member of Dicraeosauridae, potentially making it the second record of a dicraeosaurid from North America (the other being Suuwassea).
