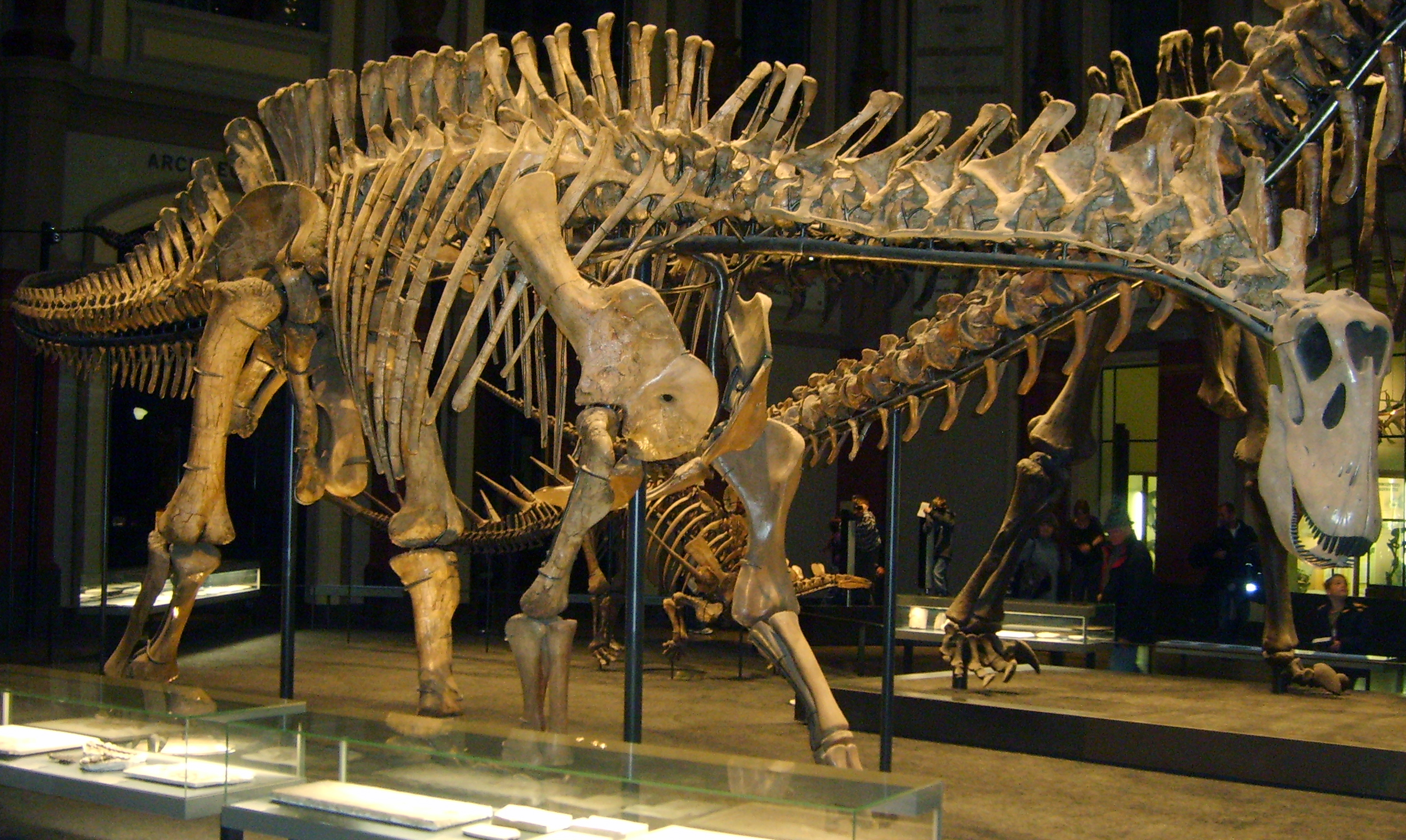
- Dicraeosaurus skeleton

Scientific classification
- Kingdom: Animalia
- Phylum: Chordata
- Class: Reptilia
- Clade: Dinosauria
- Clade: Saurischia
- Clade: †Sauropodomorpha
- Clade: †Sauropoda
- Superfamily: †Diplodocoidea
- Family: †Dicraeosauridae
- Subfamily: †Dicraeosaurinae; Janensch, 1929
- Genus: †Dicraeosaurus

Type species
- †Dicraeosaurus hansemanni Janensch, 1914

Species
- D. hansemanni Janensch, 1914; D. sattleri Janensch, 1914

= Dicraeosaurus =

Dicraeosaurus Temporal range: Late Jurassic, Kimmeridgian–Tithonian

Extinct genus of dinosaurs from late Jurassic in Lindi Region, Tanzania

Dicraeosaurus (Gr. δικραιος, dikraios "bifurcated, double-headed" + Gr. σαυρος, sauros "lizard") is a genus of diplodocoid sauropod dinosaur that lived in what is now Lindi Region, Tanzania during the late Jurassic period. The genus was named for the neural spines on the back of its neck. The first fossil was described by paleontologist Werner Janensch in 1914.

== Description ==
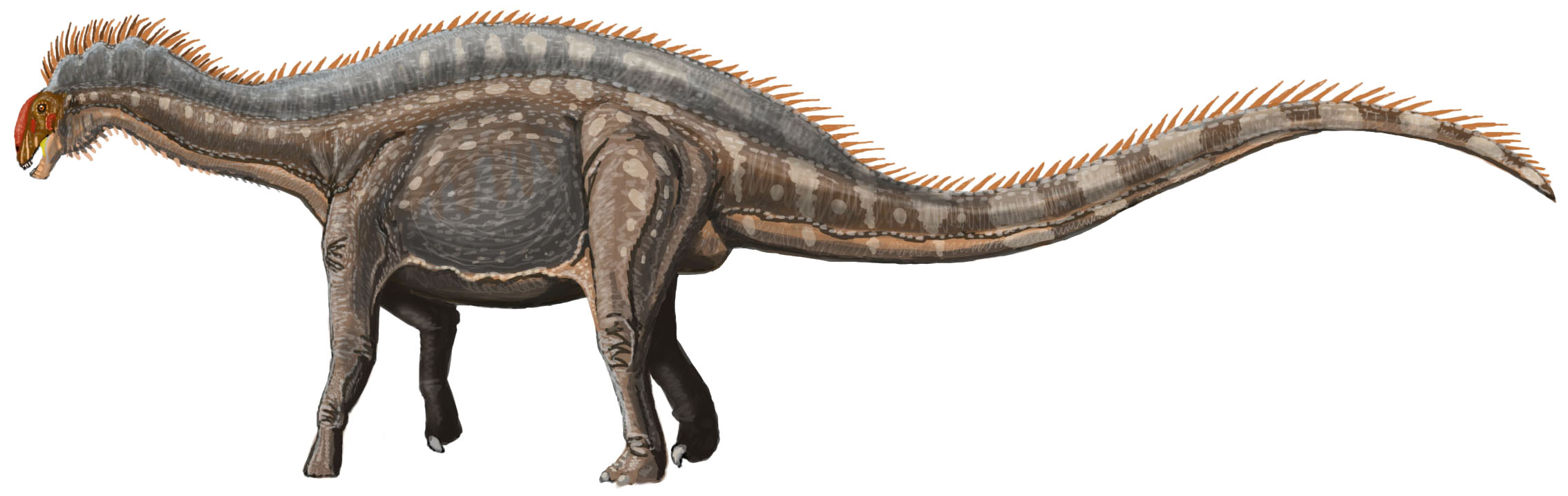
Restoration of D. hansemanni

Size comparison of Dicraeosauridae. D. hansemanni in brown, D. sattleri in red.

Unlike most diplodocoids, Dicraeosaurus had a comparatively large head with a relatively short and wide neck. The neck contained 12 unusually short vertebrae, likely indicating a low-level browser of vegetation no more than 3 metres (9.8 ft) off the ground. Dicraeosaurus also lacked the "whiplash" tail tip typical of diplodocoids. It was smaller than many other diplodocoids, at only 14–15 metres (46–49 ft) in length and 5–6 metric tons (5.5–6.6 short tons), though this still makes it among the larger known members of the family Dicraeosauridae. The genus is notable for the rather tall neural spines protruding from its vertebrae, which it is named for. They were not straight as in some members of the family, instead forming a rough "Y" shape. These spines likely provided muscle attachment points.

In 2008, Lehman and Woodward estimated the minimum and maximum ages of a mature adult Dicraeosaurus at 11 to 22 years, and the average growth rate to be 227–455 kg (500–1,003 lb) per year.

== Palaeoecology ==
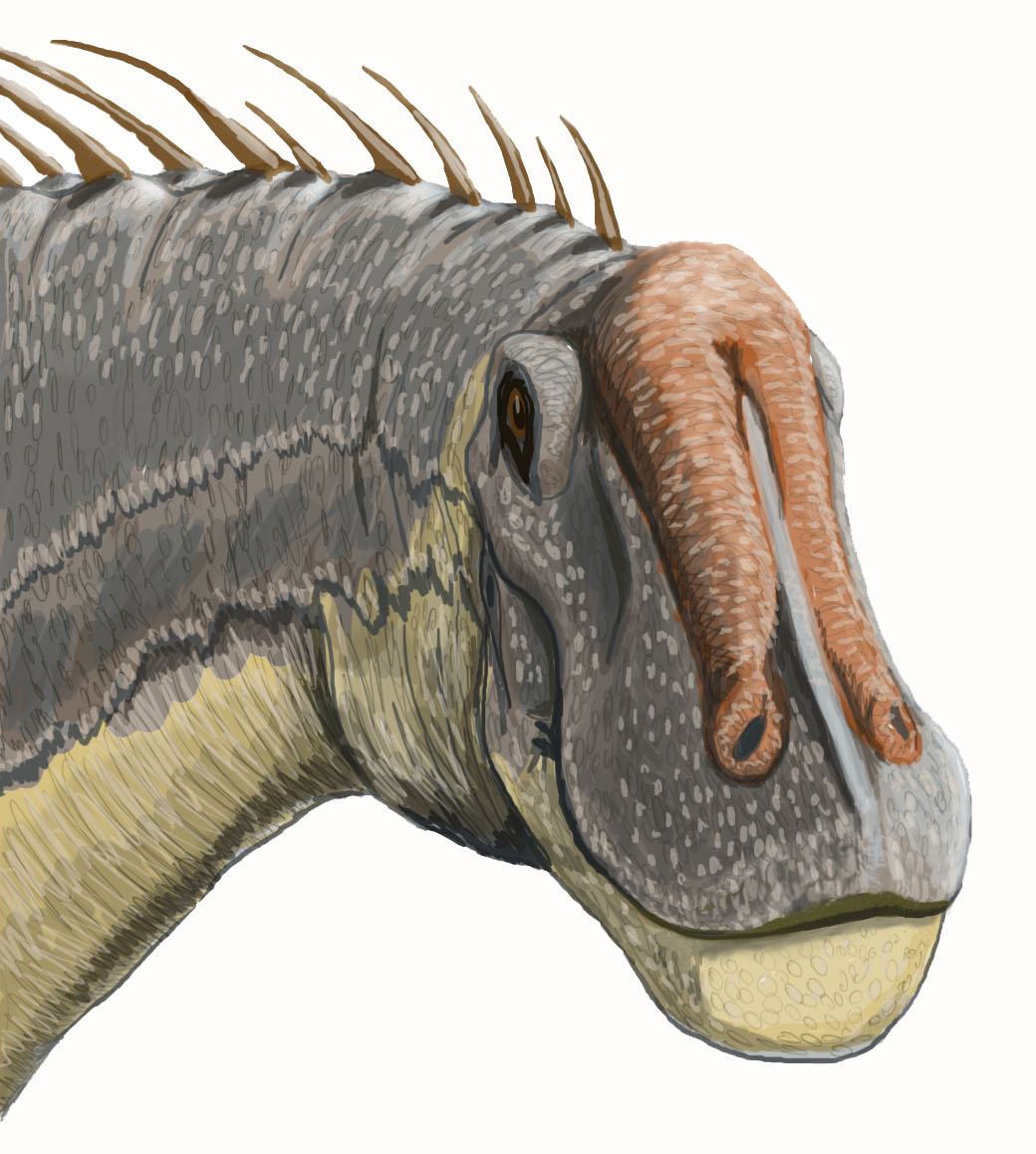
Restoration of the head

Dicraeosaurus was a mid-sized herbivore for its ecosystem, found in the Tendaguru Formation of Tanzania, which dates to the Late Jurassic. The rocks also yield fossils of Giraffatitan and Kentrosaurus. As there was a distinct difference in size between these dinosaurs, they would probably have browsed on vegetation at different levels and therefore competition between them was likely rare.
