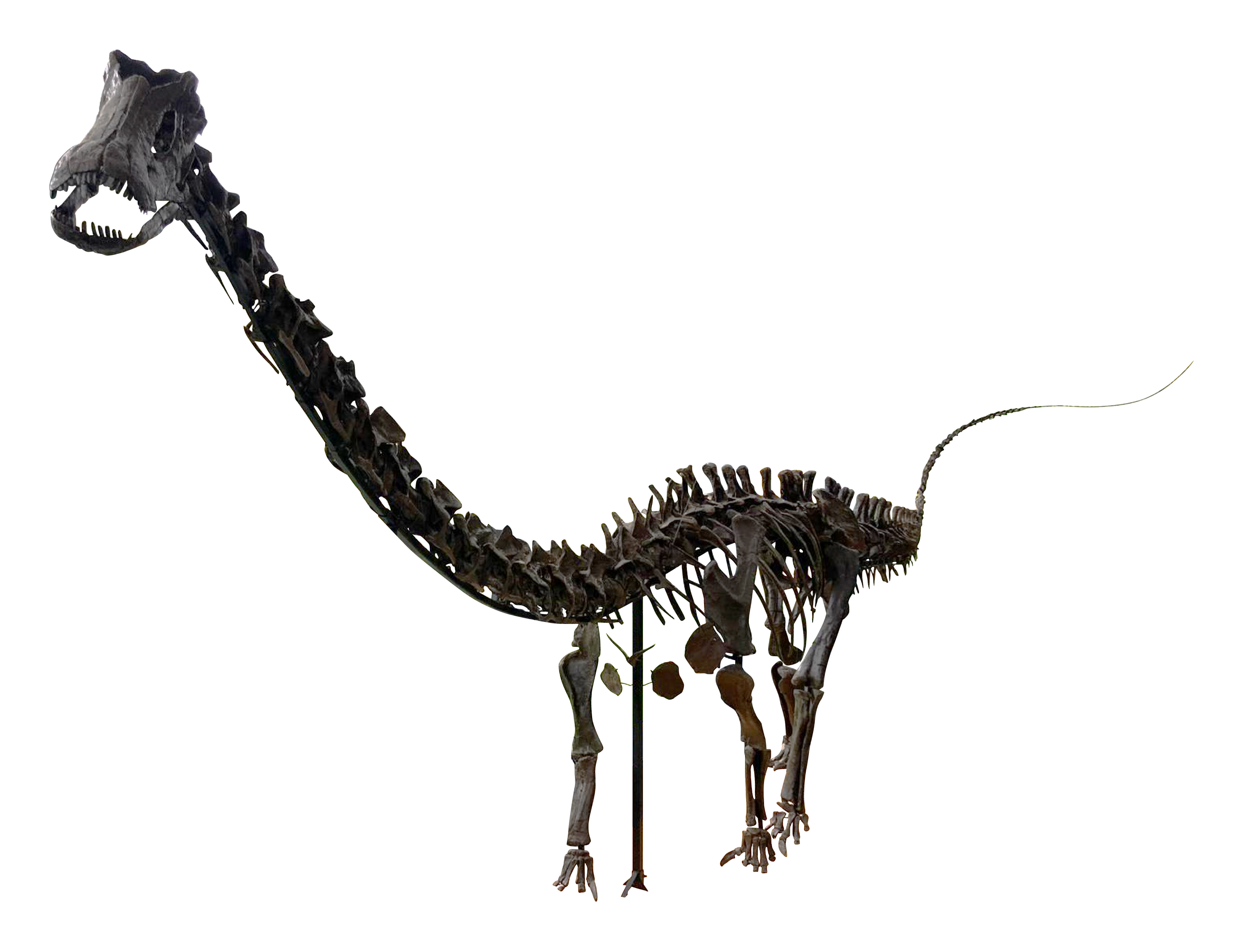
- Composite mounted skeleton, Oertijdmuseum

Scientific classification
- Kingdom: Animalia
- Phylum: Chordata
- Class: Reptilia
- Clade: Dinosauria
- Clade: Saurischia
- Clade: †Sauropodomorpha
- Clade: †Sauropoda
- Superfamily: †Diplodocoidea
- Family: †Diplodocidae
- Subfamily: †Diplodocinae
- Genus: †Ardetosaurus van der Linden et al., 2024
- Species: †A. viator

Binomial name
- †Ardetosaurus viator van der Linden et al., 2024

= Ardetosaurus =

Ardetosaurus Temporal range: Late Jurassic (Kimmeridgian), 150.4–149.2 Ma

Genus of diplodocid sauropod dinosaurs

Ardetosaurus is an extinct genus of diplodocid sauropod dinosaurs from the Late Jurassic (Kimmeridgian) Morrison Formation of northern Wyoming, United States. The genus contains a single species, Ardetosaurus viator. It was first described in 2024 on the basis of a partial articulated skeleton, including vertebrae from the neck, back, and tail, hip bones, and part of the left hindlimb. The genus is a member of the Diplodocinae, a subfamily of large long-necked dinosaurs with whiplike tails. Ardetosaurus represents one of many distinct sauropod taxa that coexisted in this formation.

The Ardetosaurus holotype was collected in 1993 before being shipped to Switzerland, from which it was later sent to Germany, where it was damaged by a museum fire, and later the Netherlands, where it is now housed. It can be distinguished from other diplodocines based on a unique arrangement of laminae on its vertebrae.

== Discovery and naming ==
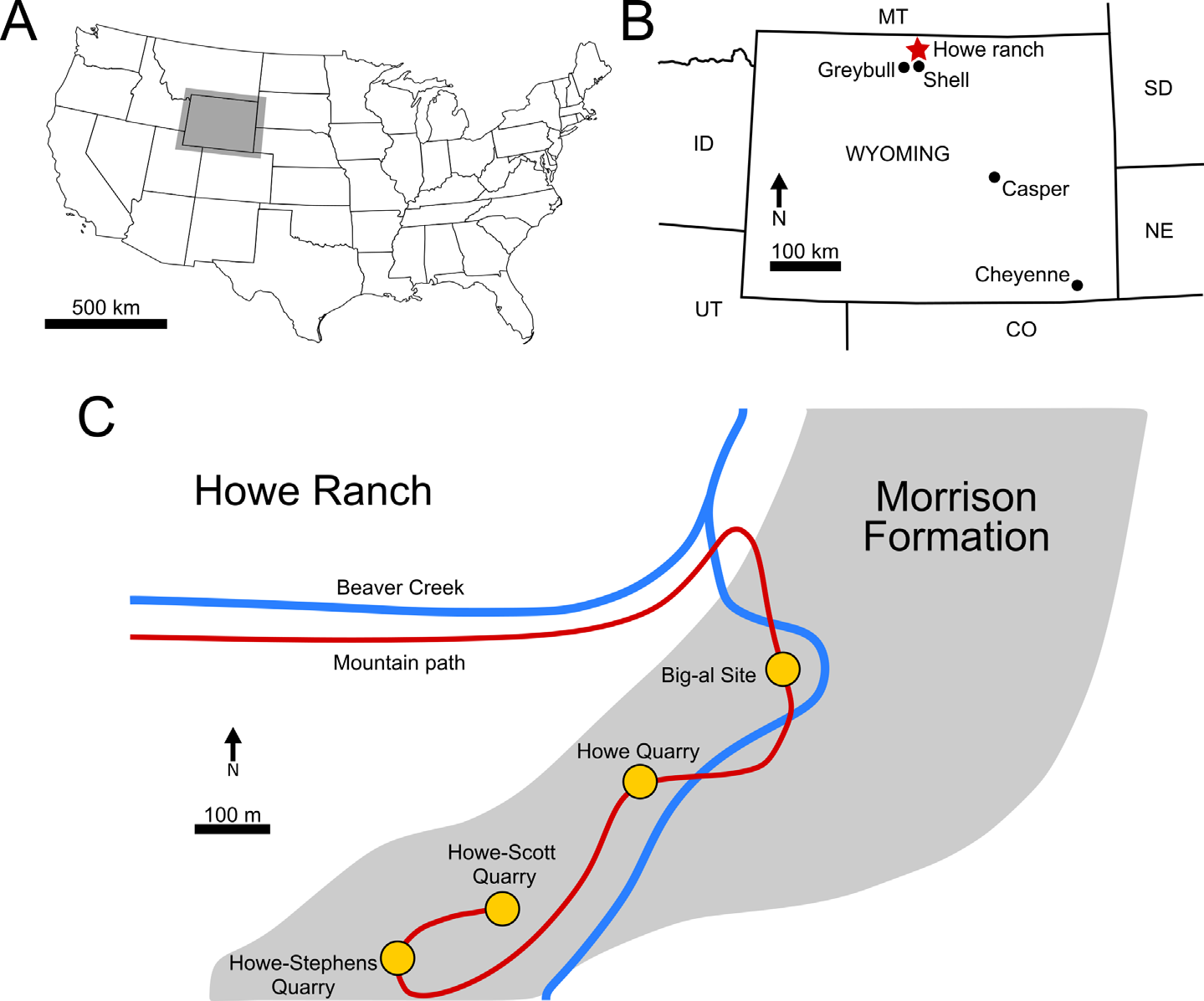
Location of the Howe-Stephens Quarry, the type locality

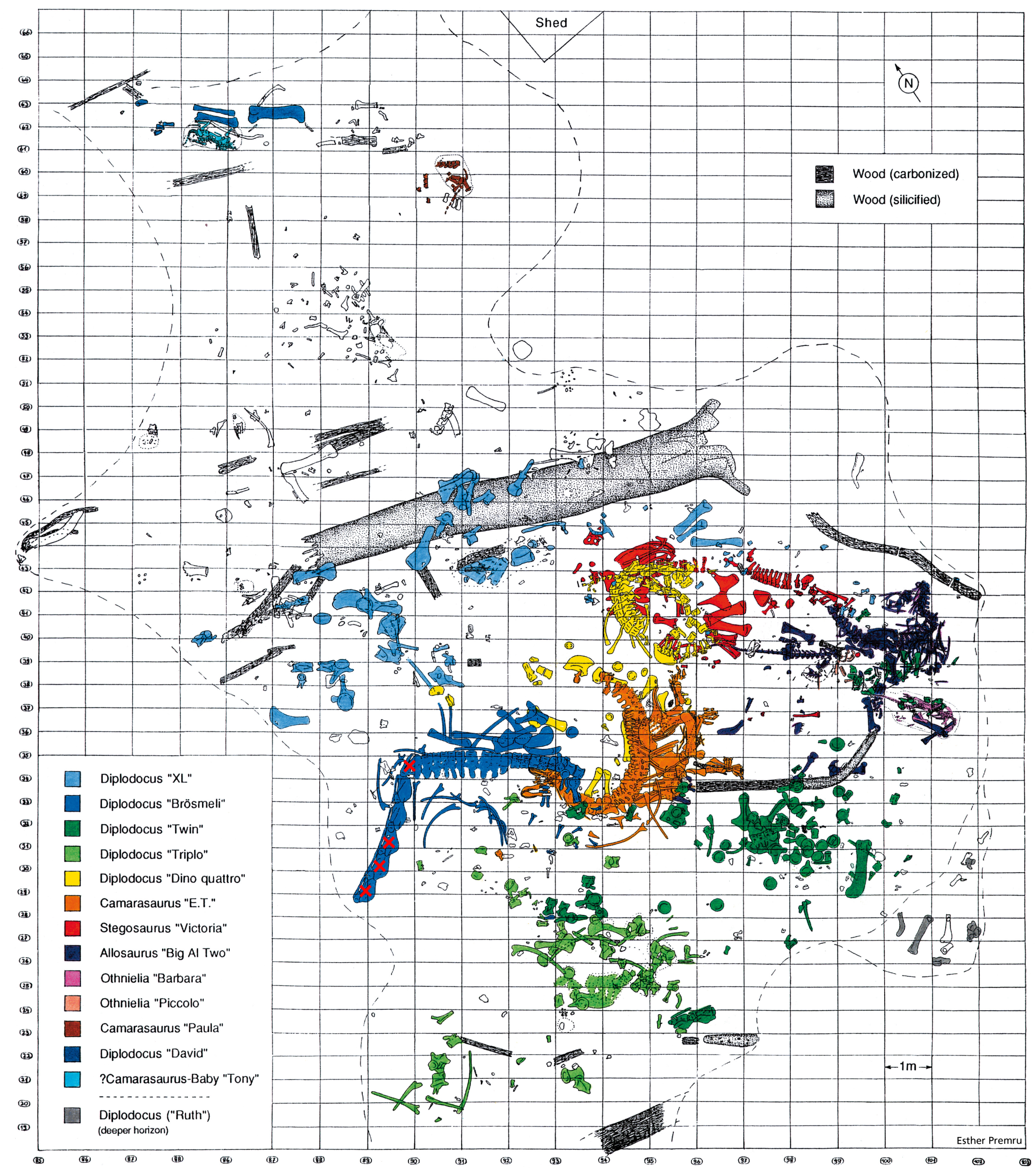
Excavation map of the Howe-Stephens Quarry, with Brösmeli labeled as a specimen of Diplodocus

The Morrison Formation is a famous geological formation with prominent outcrops throughout the western United States. One notable locality is the Howe Ranch in northern Wyoming's Bighorn Basin, which comprises several fossiliferous sites. One of the most well-known of these is the Howe Quarry, which was first excavated by Barnum Brown and the American Museum of Natural History in 1934. This team uncovered close to three thousand bones representing multiple dinosaur species. Fieldwork did not immediately continue after that year, with much of the collected material being subsequently lost. In 1989, Hans-Jakob Siber and workers from the Aathal Dinosaur Museum revisited this location, finding another site later named the Howe-Stephens Quarry. Among the many associated dinosaur skeletons was a partial articulated skeleton of a diplodocid sauropod, found during the extraction of a Camarasaurus specimen nicknamed "E. T." in the summer of 1993. It was subsequently collected in several excavation trips until the fall of 1994. The fossil—originally identified as belonging to the genus Diplodocus—was given the nickname "Brösmeli", meaning "crumbly" in Swiss German, and sent to Europe for preparation and eventual study.

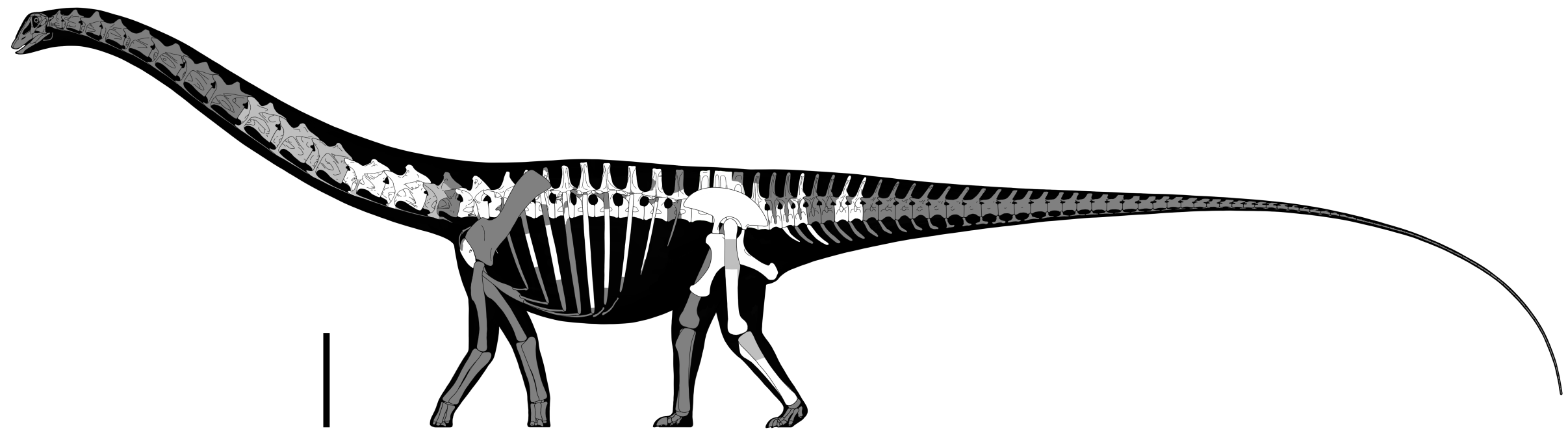
Reconstructed skeleton of Ardetosaurus, with preserved bones in white and lost material in light gray

The Brösmeli specimen was first housed at the Aathal Dinosaur Museum in Switzerland, where it was cataloged as SMA 0013. At an unrecorded date, it was later sent to the Dinosaurier Freilichtmuseum in Münchehagen, Germany for preparation. On October 4–5, 2003, a destructive fire caused by malicious arson damaged much of the museum's exhibition hall and laboratory. More than 100 bones from different specimens were entirely destroyed, including about 15% of the bones that had been prepared from the Brösmeli specimen. Reviews of field notes and maps indicate that three anterior cervical vertebrae and the field jackets protecting the dorsal vertebrae were mostly lost, with the femur and fibula sustaining significant damage. The tibia exhibits burn marks on the proximal end. Subsequently, the partially-prepared specimen was bought by the Oertijdmuseum in Boxtel, the Netherlands, in 2018 and 2019, where it was given the new specimen number MAB011899. The Oertijdmuseum also purchased four other diplodocoid specimens, nicknamed "Aurora", "Triplo", "Twin", and "XL", found in the same quarry as Brösmeli. Final preparation on these specimens was carried out by this museum. The bones referable to MAB011899 comprise cervical vertebrae 13–14, dorsal vertebrae 1–10, several ribs, part of the sacrum, the left ilium, the pubes and ischia, the first five caudal vertebrae, two chevrons, the left coracoid, the partial left femur and fibula, the left tibia.

Once Brösmeli, Triplo, and Twin were fully prepared, the museum organized a mounted composite skeleton based on these specimens, which was completed in March 2022. Most of the skeleton is represented by the three specimens, although they are not all referable to the same taxon.

In 2024, van der Linden et al. described Ardetosaurus viator as a new genus and species of diplodocine sauropods based on MAB011899, the holotype specimen. The generic name, Ardetosaurus is a combination of the Latin ardērē, meaning "to burn", and the Ancient Greek σαῦρος (sauros), meaning "lizard". This refers to the holotype specimen's history with fire, with some elements having been lost and others still bearing burn marks from the 2003 Dinosaurier Freilichtmuseum fire. The specific name, viator, is the Latin word for traveler, referring to the long journey the specimen has gone through to arrive in the Netherlands.

== Description ==
Size compared to a human

Ardetosaurus is a member of the sauropod family Diplodocidae. All sauropods are quadrupedal herbivores with small heads, columnar legs, and long necks and tails. Diplodocids are further characterized by their extremely elongated necks and whip-like tails. Members of this family have thin, cylindrical pencil-like teeth confined to the front of their jaws that may have assisted the animals in effectively stripping leaves from branches. Their nasal openings are situated closer to the eyes than the tip of the snout. The forelimbs of these sauropods are notably smaller than their hindlimbs—a trait that may have facilitated rearing.

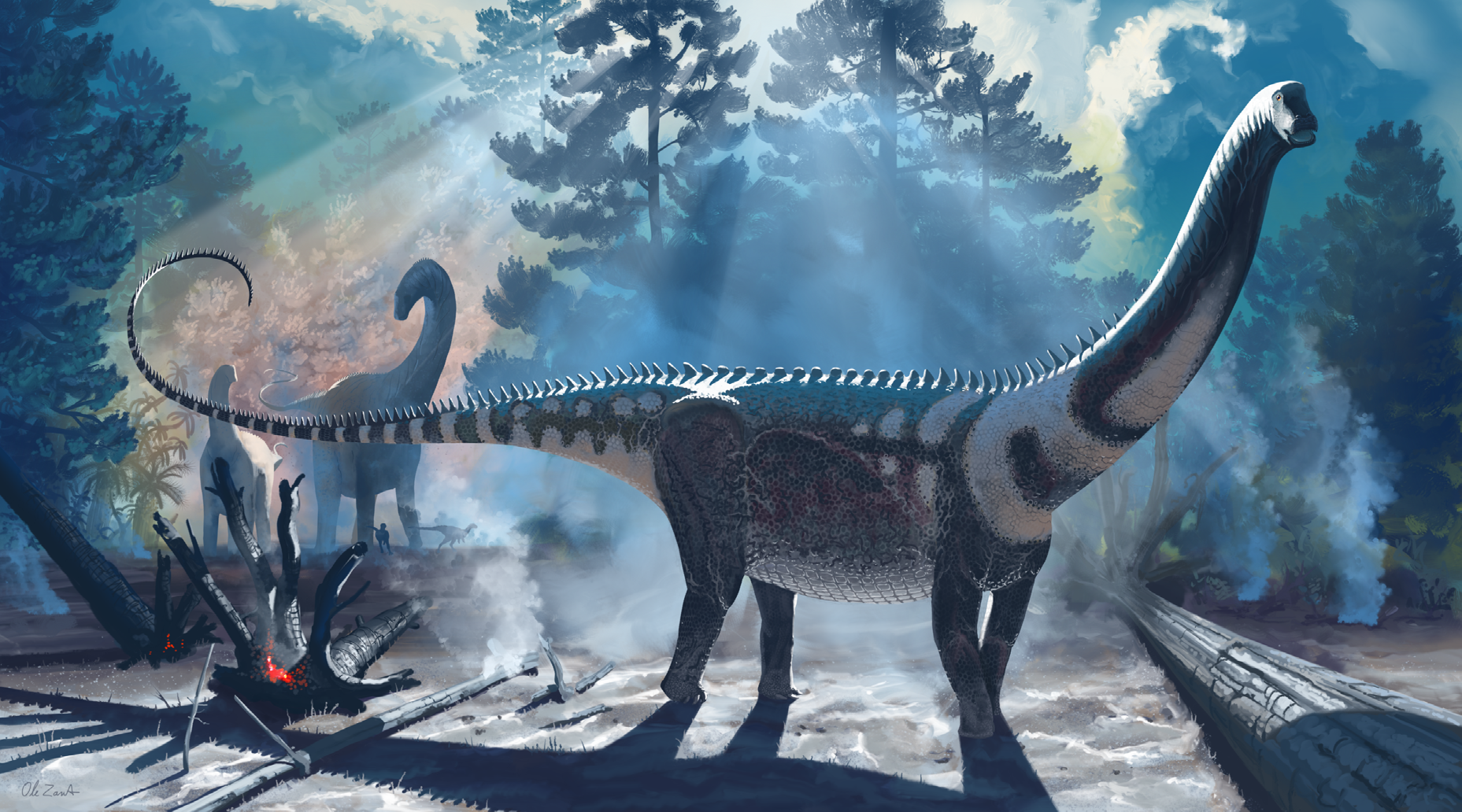
Speculative life restoration

Ardetosaurus can be more precisely classified within the diplodocid subfamily Diplodocinae, which includes sauropods more similar to Diplodocus than Apatosaurus. Diplodocines exhibit a vast range of body sizes, including some of the longest known dinosaurs such as Supersaurus, at 35–40 metres (115–131 ft). Conversely, some were much smaller, such as the Argentinian Leinkupal at about 9 metres (30 ft). While incomplete, the femur of Ardetosaurus is estimated at around 130 centimetres (51 in) long, with a tibia at 91.5 centimetres (36.0 in). The holotype bones of the skeletally immature Galeamopus pabsti are comparable in size, including a 116 centimetres (46 in)-long femur and 84.5 centimetres (33.3 in)-long tibia. The subadult Galeamopus pabsti holotype individual is estimated at 18.2 metres (60 ft) long.

== Classification ==
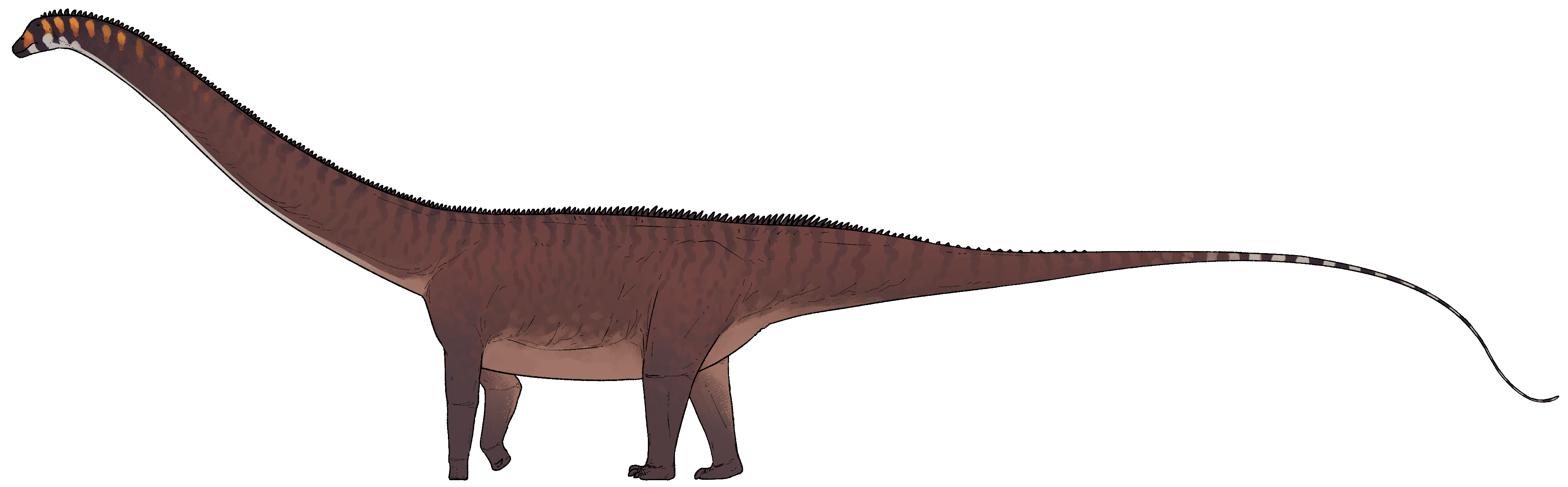
Life restoration

Ardetosaurus is a diplodocine sauropod, placing it among several taxa that also lived in the Morrison Formation including Diplodocus, Galeamopus and Supersaurus. All members of this group are herbivores that lived between 161.2 and 136.4 Mya.

In their 2024 description of the taxon, van der Linden and colleagues refrained from including a phylogenetic analysis, stating that the description is part of an ongoing project to investigate the systematics of the much broader clade Diplodocoidea. They mention that a collaborative phylogeny will be published in the future, which will include a number of new diplodocoid specimens. As such, the exact relationships of Ardetosaurus with other diplodocines remain unknown.

The following cladogram of Diplodocidae is simplified from a 2015 analysis by Tschopp and colleagues, illustrating the general relationships of many described diplodocine species.

- Diplodocidae
  - Amphicoelias altus
  - - Apatosaurinae
    - - Unnamed species
      - - Tornieria africana
        - - - Supersaurus lourinhanensis
            - Supersaurus vivianae
          - - Leinkupal laticauda
            - - Galeamopus hayi
              - - - Diplodocus carnegii
                  - Diplodocus hallorum
                - - Kaatedocus siberi
                  - Barosaurus lentus

== Paleobiology ==
A dorsal rib of the Ardetosaurus holotype was histologically sectioned to determine its growth patterns. These analyses indicate that the specimen belonged to a fully mature adult that grew for about 22 years, reaching sexual maturity at about 13 years and skeletal maturity at 17 years. The maturity of this specimen is indicated by the presence of an external fundamental system (EFS), which is a band of tissue that only develops when bone growth slows in older animals. The total growth span for MAB011899 was estimated to be 22 years, with the three additional years being due to the loss of the medullary cavity. MAB011899 preserves a first chevron, an element typically not found in other sauropods, which may be a sign of sexual dimorphism, generic or specific differences, or variations in tail musculature. Claims of sexual dimorphism in sauropod fossils are often poorly supported or misinterpretations of other features as only one neosauropod has ever been recorded with a definitive case. This lack of signs of sexual dimorphism is accentuated by the sparse occurrence of sexual display structures, with the only exceptions possibly being dicraeosaurids like Amargasaurus. However, the configuration of the muscle attachments on the first chevron in MAB011899 suggest that it could be a sign of sexual dimorphism based on those of crocodilians and the oviraptorid Khaan, however this could also simply be due to individual variation. Van der Linden et al. stated that more research into the chevrons of sauropods like those of Ardetosaurus is needed to understand the variations observed in chevron morphology.

== Paleoecology ==
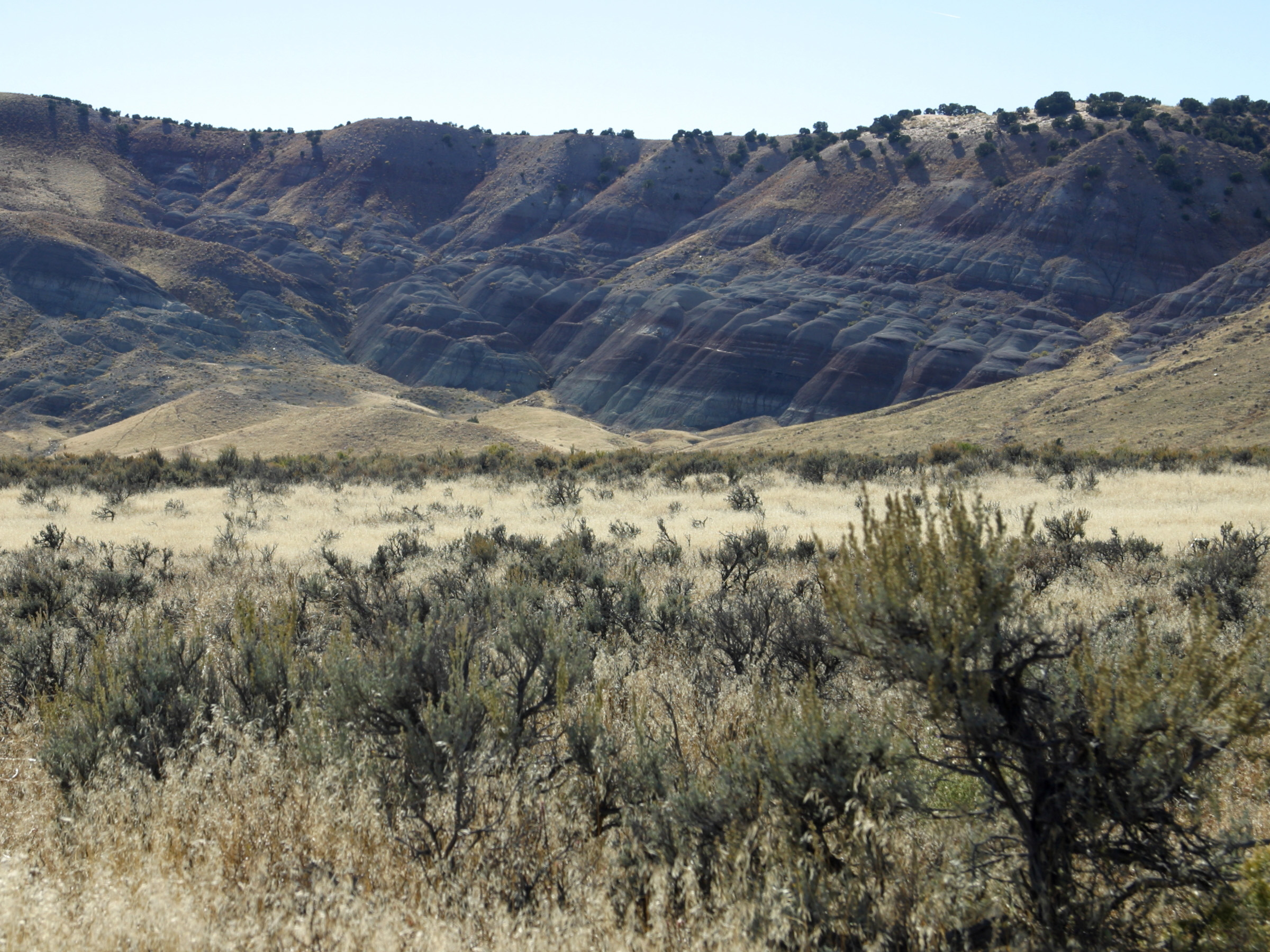
Outcrops of the Morrison Formation in Dinosaur National Monument

Ardetosaurus is known from the Morrison Formation, a rock sequence with outcrops throughout the western United States known for its rich dinosaur fauna. Radiometric dating indicates the formation is about 156.3 million years old (Ma) at the base and up to 146.8 million years old at the top, placing it within the latest Oxfordian, Kimmeridgian, and early Tithonian ages of the Late Jurassic epoch. The Morrison Formation is comparable in age and faunal composition to the Lourinhã Formation in Portugal and the Tendaguru Formation in Tanzania.

=== Paleoenvironment ===
The ancient Morrison Basin region, where many dinosaurs lived, ranged from Alberta and Saskatchewan in the north to New Mexico in the south. It was formed when the Rocky Mountains precursors began to push up to the west. Rivers carried the east-facing drainage basin deposits into swampy lowlands, lakes, river channels, and floodplains.These alluvial and shallow marine depositional environments have been interpreted as representing a semi-arid environment with separate wet and dry seasons.

=== Contemporary fauna and flora ===
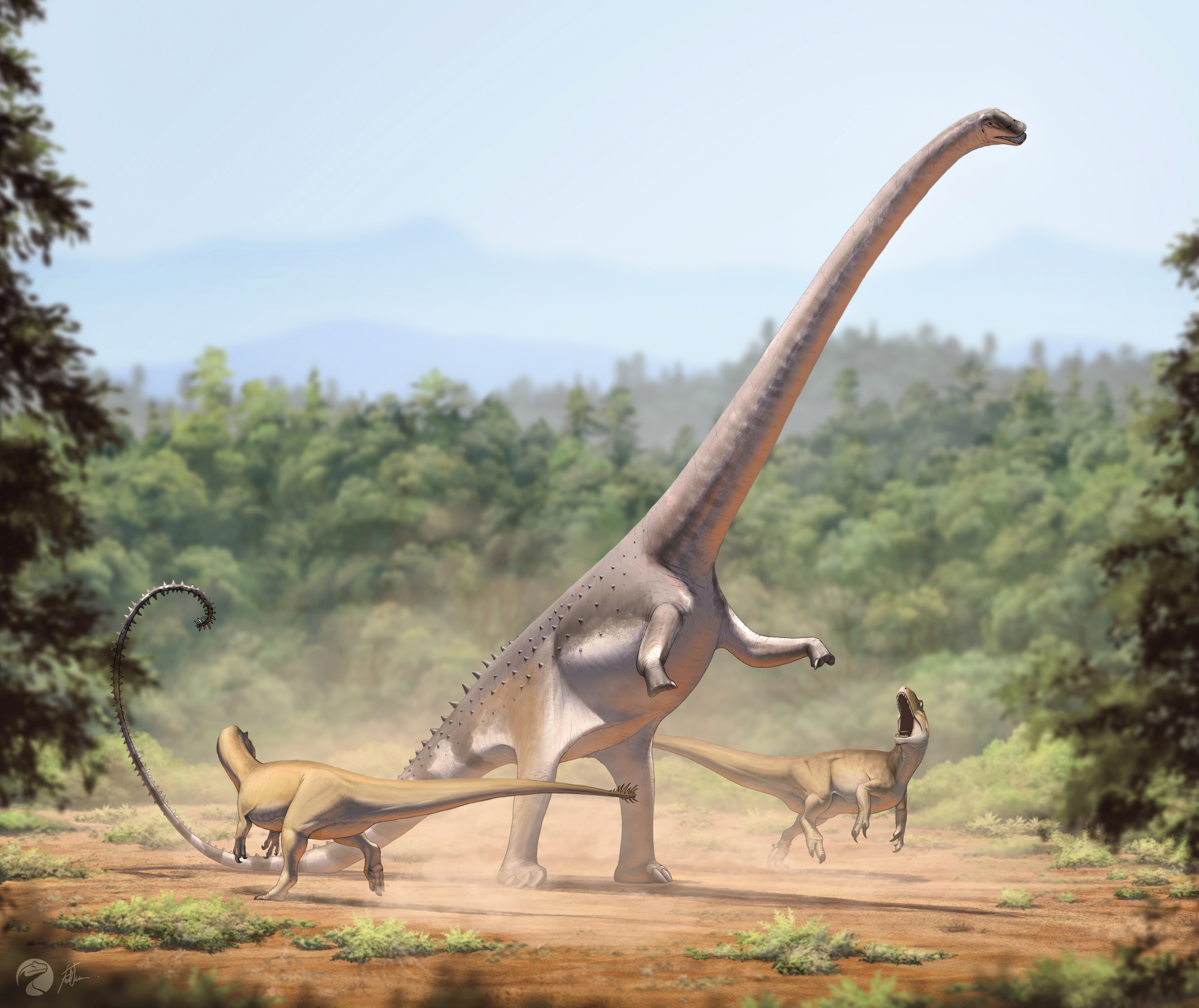
Speculative restoration of Barosaurus and Allosaurus in a Morrison Formation landscape

The Morrison Formation records a diverse dinosaur fauna in addition to fossils of other animals and plants. It is known for its plentiful sauropod fauna. In particular, the Howe-Stephens Quarry from which Ardetosaurus is known has yielded associated skeletons of the sauropods Diplodocus and Camarasaurus, the armored Stegosaurus, the theropod Allosaurus and the small herbivorous Nanosaurus.

In addition to Ardetosaurus, other diplodocines of the Morrison Formation include Diplodocus, Barosaurus, Supersaurus and Galeamopus. Apatosaurines include Apatosaurus—one of the most abundant Morrison sauropods—and Brontosaurus. Dicraeosaurids are less common, comprising isolated specimens of Smitanosaurus, Dyslocosaurus, and Suuwassea. Amphicoelias (a diplodocid of uncertain placement), Kaatedocus (a possible diplodocine), Maraapunisaurus (a possible rebbachisaurid) and the basal diplodocoid Haplocanthosaurus are also known. Macronarian sauropods in the Morrison Formation include Brachiosaurus but are dominated by the very common Camarasaurus.

Theropods are also common in the Morrison Formation, including the extremely common Allosaurus, which represents the apex predator in Morrison ecosystems. Other taxa include the allosauroid Saurophaganax, ceratosaurs Ceratosaurus and Fosterovenator, megalosaurs Torvosaurus and Marshosaurus, and the coelurosaurs Coelurus, Ornitholestes, and Tanycolagreus (all basal forms), Stokesosaurus (a basal tyrannosauroid), and Hesperornithoides (a troodontid). Morrison ornithischians include stegosaurs (Alcovasaurus, Hesperosaurus, and Stegosaurus), ankylosaurs (Gargoyleosaurus and Mymoorapelta), the heterodontosaurid Fruitadens, basal neornithischians (Nanosaurus), and ornithopods (Camptosaurus—the most geographically widespread Morrison ornithopod—Dryosaurus—the most temporally widespread Morrison ornithopod—and Uteodon).

Non-dinosaurian animals in the Morrison Formation include pterosaurs (Harpactognathus, Kepodactylus, Mesadactylus, and Utahdactylus), in addition to many ray-finned fishes, amphibians, turtles, sphenodontians, lizards, terrestrial and aquatic crocodylomorphs, and various small mammals. Bivalve and aquatic snail shells can also be found. The contemporary flora of the period comprised mosses, horsetails, and various families of cycads, cycadeoid, ginkgo, and conifer. Vegetation varied from gallery forests of ferns and tree ferns along rivers, woodland savannas of ginkgos and coniferophytes, and fern savannas with scattered trees.

== See also ==
- List of dinosaurs of the Morrison Formation
- List of dinosaur specimens with nicknames
- 2024 in archosaur paleontology
