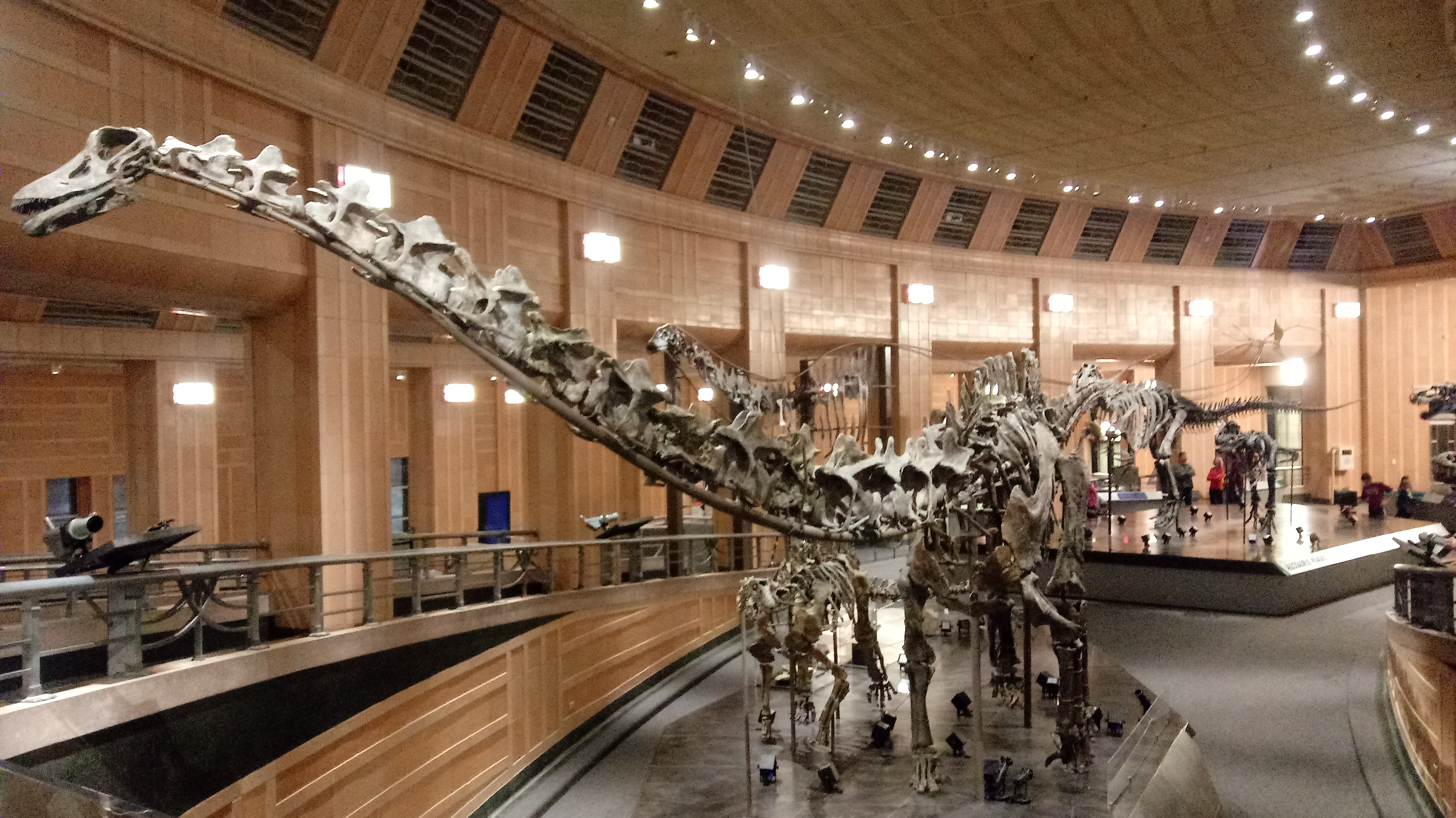
- G. pabsti skeleton in Cincinnati Museum Center at Union Terminal

Scientific classification
- Kingdom: Animalia
- Phylum: Chordata
- Class: Reptilia
- Clade: Dinosauria
- Clade: Saurischia
- Clade: †Sauropodomorpha
- Clade: †Sauropoda
- Superfamily: †Diplodocoidea
- Family: †Diplodocidae
- Subfamily: †Diplodocinae
- Genus: †Galeamopus; Tschopp et al., 2015

Type species
- †Diplodocus hayi Holland, 1924

Species
- †G. hayi (Holland, 1924); †G. pabsti Tschopp & Mateus, 2017

Synonyms
- Diplodocus hayi Holland, 1924 (type)

= Galeamopus =

Galeamopus Temporal range: Late Jurassic, 155–152.9 Ma

Extinct genus of dinosaurs

Galeamopus is a genus of herbivorous diplodocid sauropod dinosaurs. It contains two known species: Galeamopus hayi, known from the Late Jurassic lower Morrison Formation (Kimmeridgian age, about 155 million years ago) of Wyoming, United States, and Galeamopus pabsti, known from Wyoming and Colorado. The type species is known from one of the well-preserved diplodocid fossils, a nearly complete skeleton with an associated skull.

== History ==
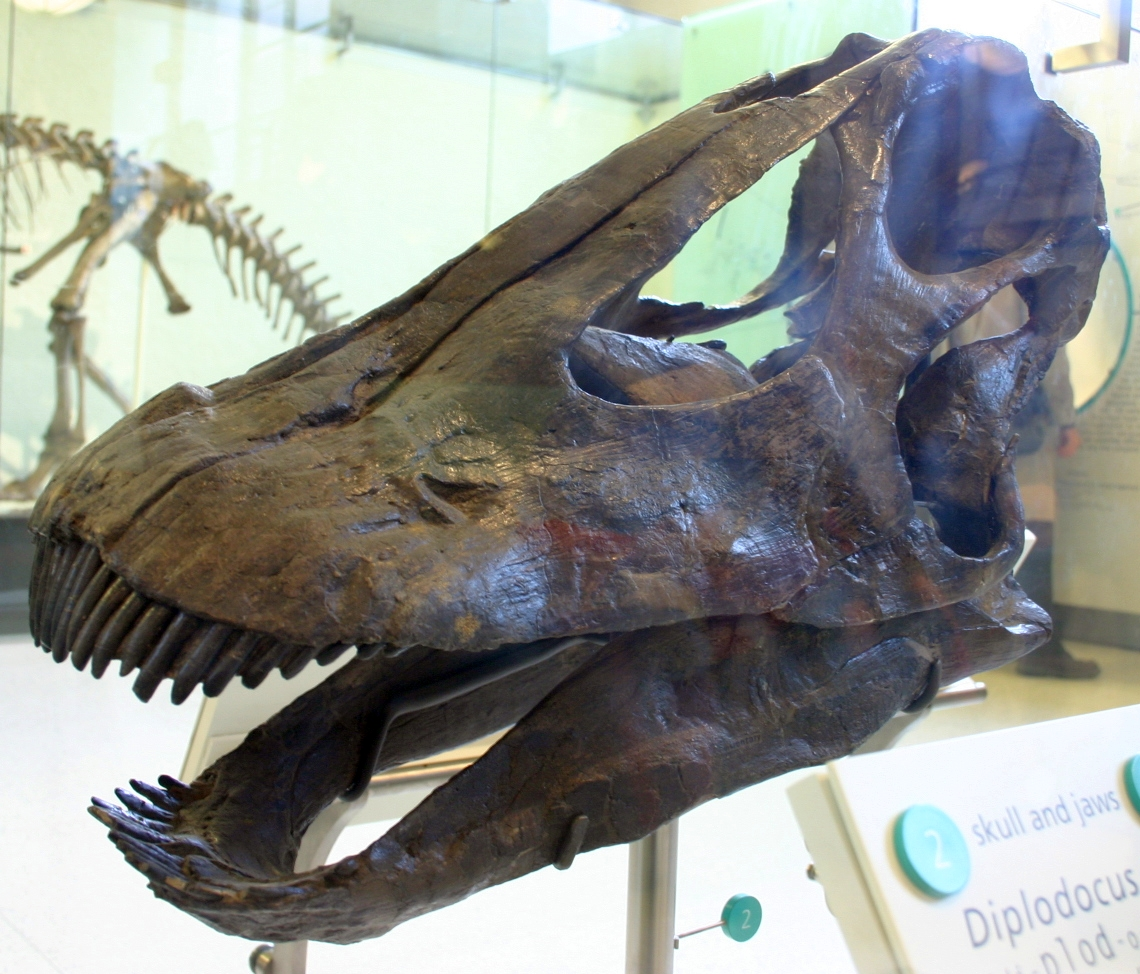
G. hayi skull (specimen AMNH 969)

The first specimen referred to Galeamopus was collected by Marshall P. Felch in September, 1884 at his quarry in Garden Park, Colorado. The specimen consisted of a partial skull and mandibles, which Felch sent to his employer at the Yale Peabody Museum, Othniel Charles Marsh, but was later deposited at the National Museum of Natural History (USNM V 2673). It was referred to Diplodocus for many years until Tschopp et al referred the remains to Galeamopus in 2015 and Galeamopus pabsti in 2017.

The type specimen of Galeamopus was discovered by fossil hunter William H. Utterback in 1902 near Sheridan, Wyoming, in the Red Fork Powder River Quarry A for the Carnegie Museum of Natural History. The specimen was composed of a braincase, partial vertebral column, and several other postcranial elements. In 1906, the skeleton was referred to Diplodocus by William Jacob Holland when he described its braincase. The specimen was classified by Holland as a new species of Diplodocus, Diplodocus hayi, in 1924. The specific name honored Oliver Perry Hay.

Another Galeamopus specimen was discovered and collected by Peter Kaisen in 1903 at Bone Cabin Quarry, Wyoming during an American Museum of Natural History expedition. This specimen (AMNH 969) consisted of a nearly complete skull and the atlas-axis complex preserved in articulation, and it was also referred to Diplodocus until Tschopp's reassessment, which placed it as a specimen of Galeamopus hayi.

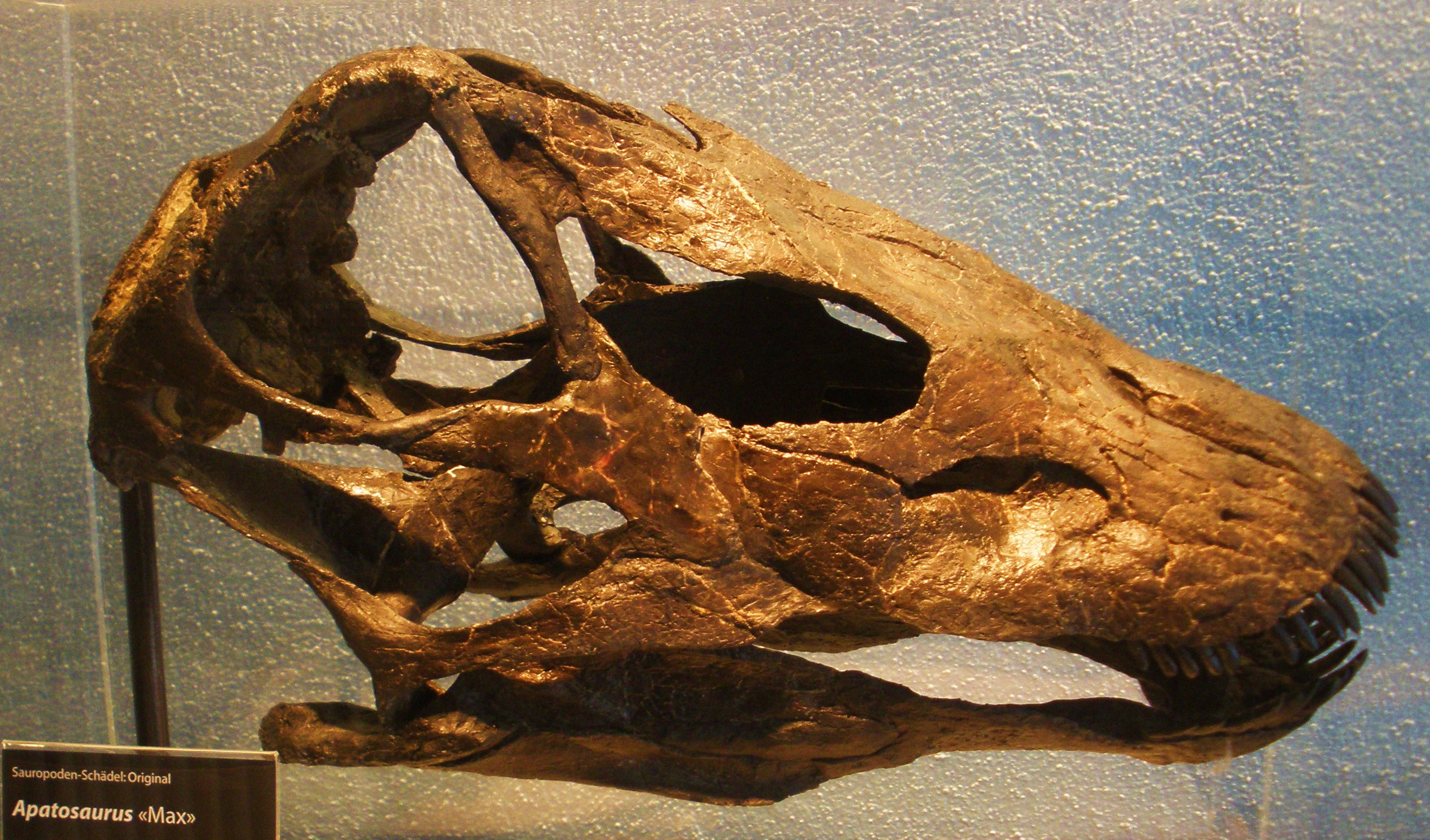
The skull of the holotype specimen of Galeamopus pabsti, SMA 00011, nicknamed "Max"

In 2015, it was renamed as the separate genus Galeamopus by Emanuel Tschopp, Octávio Mateus and Roger Benson. The generic name is derived from Latin galeam, the accusative of galea, "helmet", and opus, "need". The combination is intended as a translation of Wil-helm, literally "want helmet", in reference to the first name of both Utterback and Holland. The name is at the same time an allusion to the fact that the brittle braincase of the type specimen is in need of a helmet.

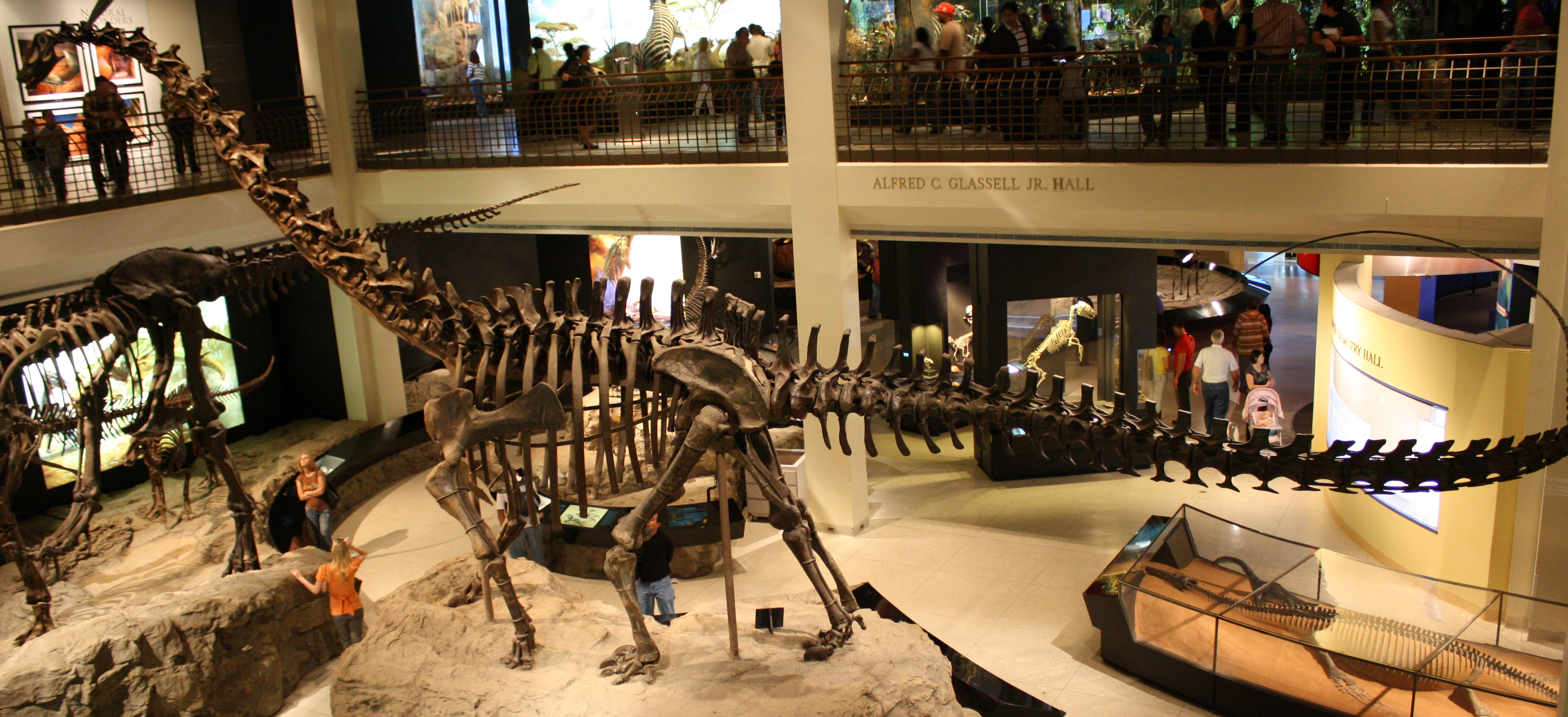
Mounted G. hayi holotype skeleton, Houston Museum of Natural Science

The genoholotype is HMNS 175 (previously CM 662), the original skeleton. It was found in layer of the lower Morrison Formation dating from the Kimmeridgian. This specimen is also the holotype of Galeamopus hayi, the combinatio nova of the type species D. hayi. Several other specimens were referred to the genus Galeamopus but not to Galeamopus hayi. All of the specimens referred to Galeamopus are from the Morrison Formation, with 3 of the 4 specimens collected in Wyoming.

SMA 0011, a skeleton nicknamed "Max" and found in June 1995 at the Howe-Stephens Quarry, was considered sufficiently different from the others to consider naming a separate species for it. The skeleton included a nearly complete skull and mandibles and the majority of the anterior postcranial skeleton. In 2017, the "Max" specimen was made the type specimen of a second Galeamopus species, G. pabsti, by Tschopp and Mateus. It was named after the Swiss paleontologist Dr. Ben Pabst, who discovered the specimen and helped mount the skeleton at Sauriermuseum Aathal.

== Description ==
Size of G. pabsti compared to a human

The 2015 study established seven distinguishing traits of the genus as such. These were autapomorphies, unique derived characters. On the back of the skull, the paroccipital process is curved in side view. The teeth have paired wear facets. The first neck vertebra, the atlas, has a neural spine with processes pointing to the front and the inside, which are separate from the rear wing of the spine. This rear wing shows a continuous transverse width over most of its length. The neural arch of the atlas has on each side of its base a small triangular spur. The second neck vertebra, the axis, has a neural spine with a knob-shaped bump on the front end of the ridge on its front side. With the middle and rear neck vertebrae, the ridge between the rear joint processes, the postzygapophyses, does not extend beyond the rear edge of the neural arch.

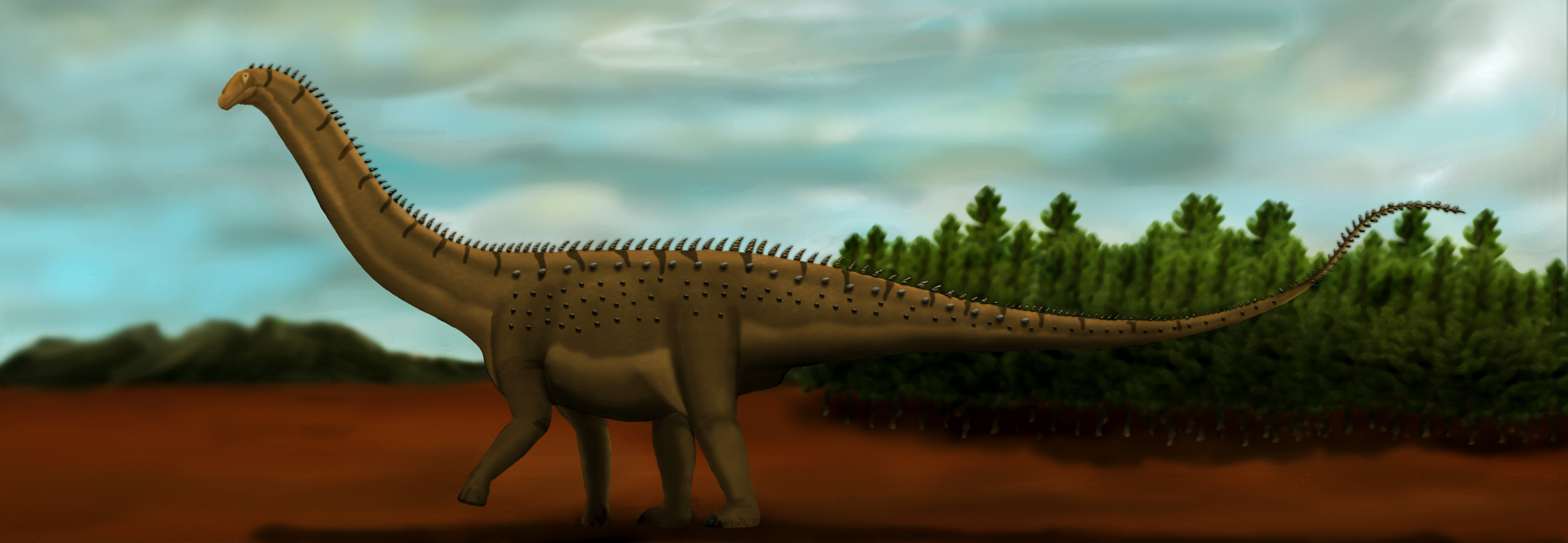
Hypothetical life restoration of G. hayi

The study also determined six autapomorphies of the type species Galeamopus hayi alone. The part of the parietal bone forming the edge between the rear skull and the skull roof is low, with a height less than that of the foramen magnum. The appending basipterygoid processes at the underside of the braincase strongly diverge at an angle of more than 60°. The ulna of the lower arm is long, with a minimum length equalling 76% of the humerus, upper arm bone, length. The surface on the radius contacting the ulna is limited in size and relatively smooth. The joint surface at the underside of the radius is bevelled relative to the shaft, at an angle of about 15°. The outer edge of the top surface of the shinbone forms a pinched process, behind the cnemial crest at the front.

Combined, there are thirteen autapomorphies present in Galeamopus, which Tschopp and colleagues considered sufficient to support a distinct genus.

== Classification ==
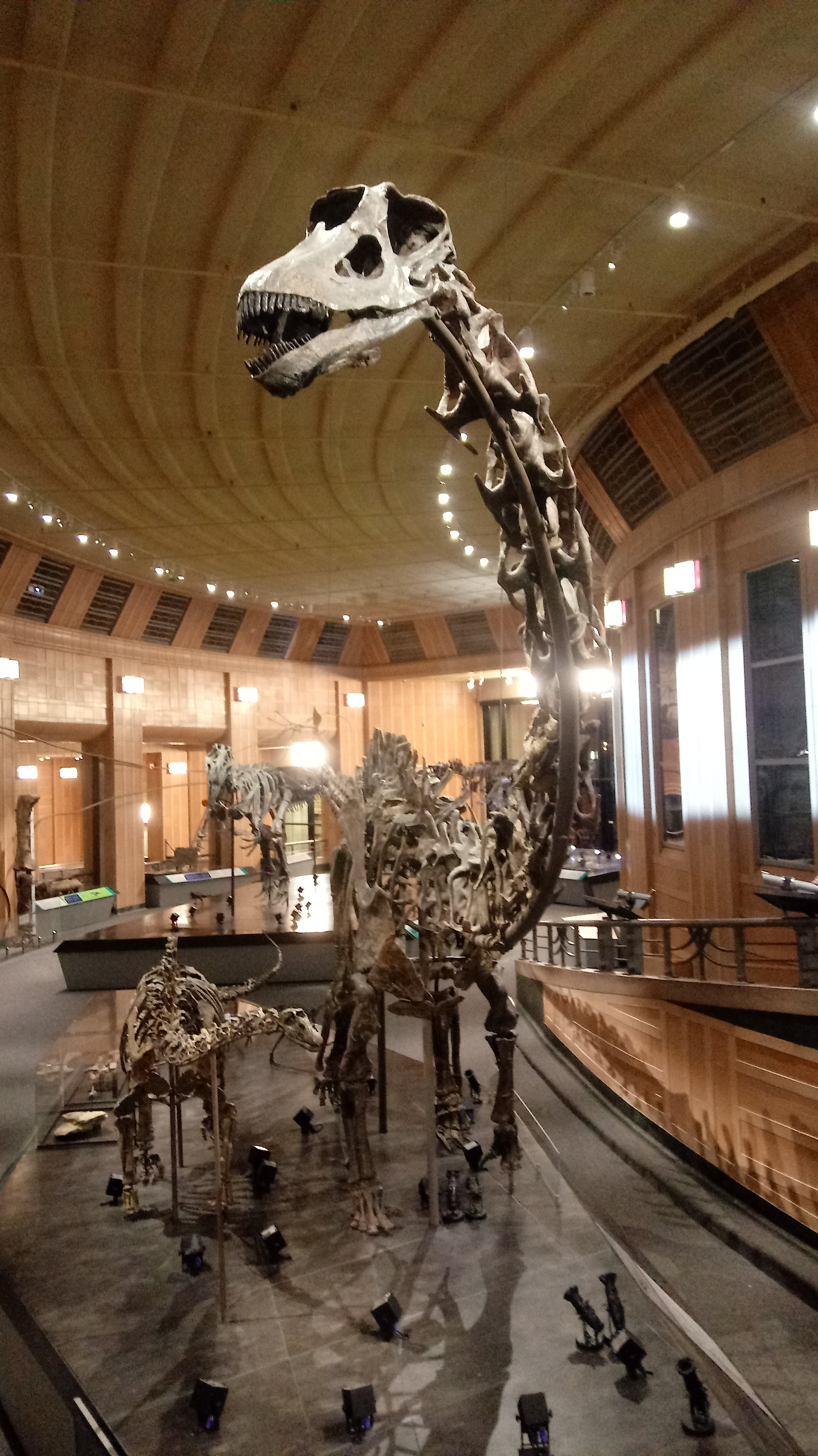
G. pabsti skeleton in Cincinnati Museum Center at Union Terminal

The cladogram below shows one hypothesis on the relationships of Galeamopus to other diplodocids, as found by the analysis of Tschopp & Mateus (2017).

- Diplodocidae
  - Apatosaurinae
    - - Apatosaurus ajax
      - Apatosaurus louisae
    - - Brontosaurus excelsus
      - - Amphicoelias altus
        - - Brontosaurus yahnahpin
          - Brontosaurus parvus
  - Diplodocinae
    - Kaatedocus siberi
    - - Tornieria africana
      - - - Dinheirosaurus lourinhanensis
          - Supersaurus vivianae
        - - Leinkupal laticauda
          - - - Galeamopus hayi
              - Galeamopus pabsti
            - - Barosaurus lentus
              - - Diplodocus carnegii
                - Diplodocus hallorum

== See also ==
- 2017 in archosaur paleontology
