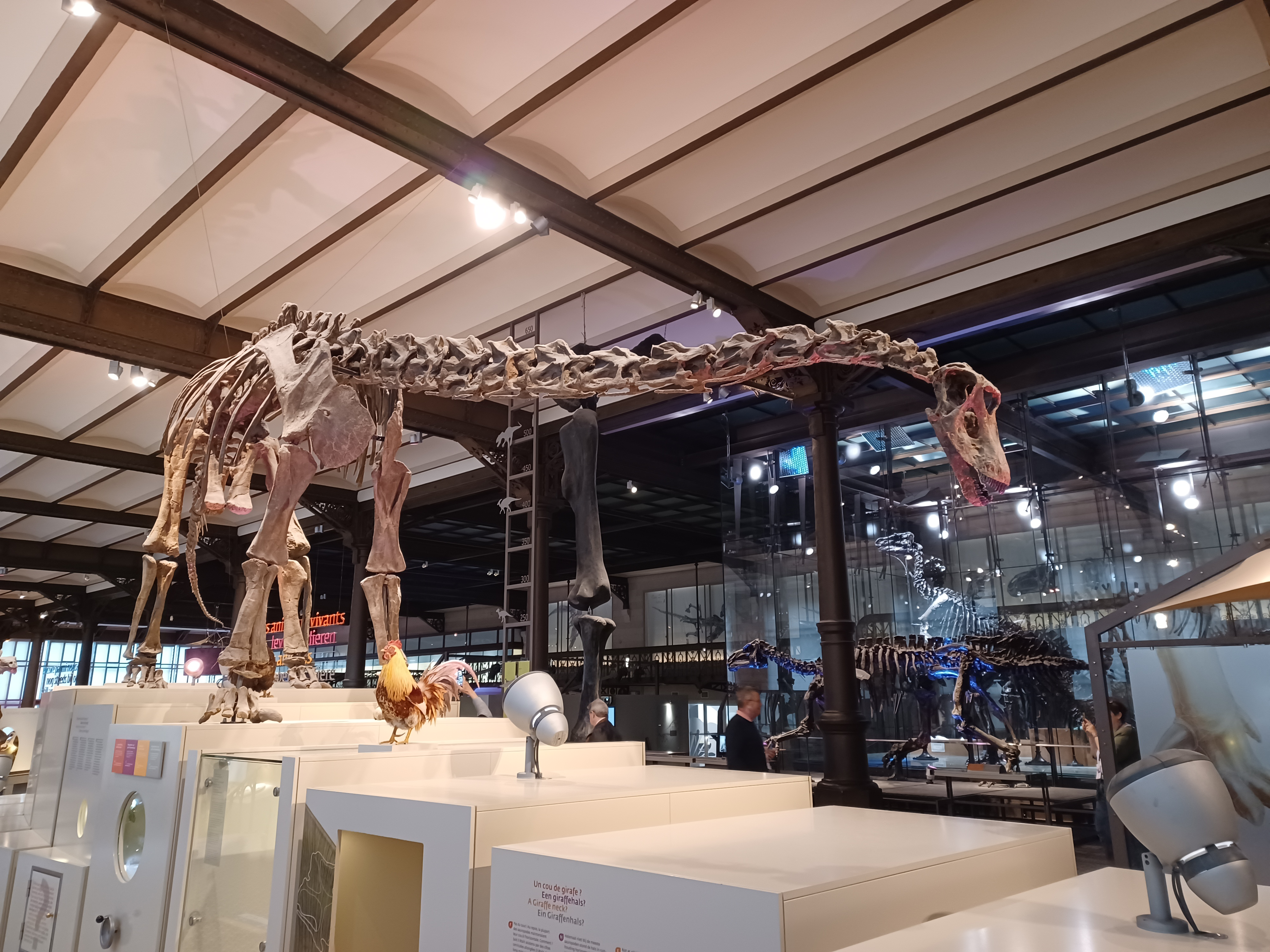
- Mounted skeleton cast, Museum of Natural Sciences of Belgium in Brussels.

Scientific classification
- Kingdom: Animalia
- Phylum: Chordata
- Class: Reptilia
- Clade: Dinosauria
- Clade: Saurischia
- Clade: †Sauropodomorpha
- Clade: †Sauropoda
- Superfamily: †Diplodocoidea
- Clade: †Flagellicaudata
- Genus: †Kaatedocus; Tschopp & Mateus, 2012

Type species
- †Kaatedocus siberi Tschopp & Mateus, 2012

= Kaatedocus =

Kaatedocus Temporal range: Late Jurassic, 155 Ma

Extinct genus of reptiles

Kaatedocus is a genus of flagellicaudatan sauropod known from the middle Late Jurassic (Kimmeridgian stage) of northern Wyoming, United States. It is known from well-preserved skull and cervical vertebrae which were collected in the lower part of the Morrison Formation. The type and only species is Kaatedocus siberi, described in 2012 by Emanuel Tschopp and Octávio Mateus.

== History ==
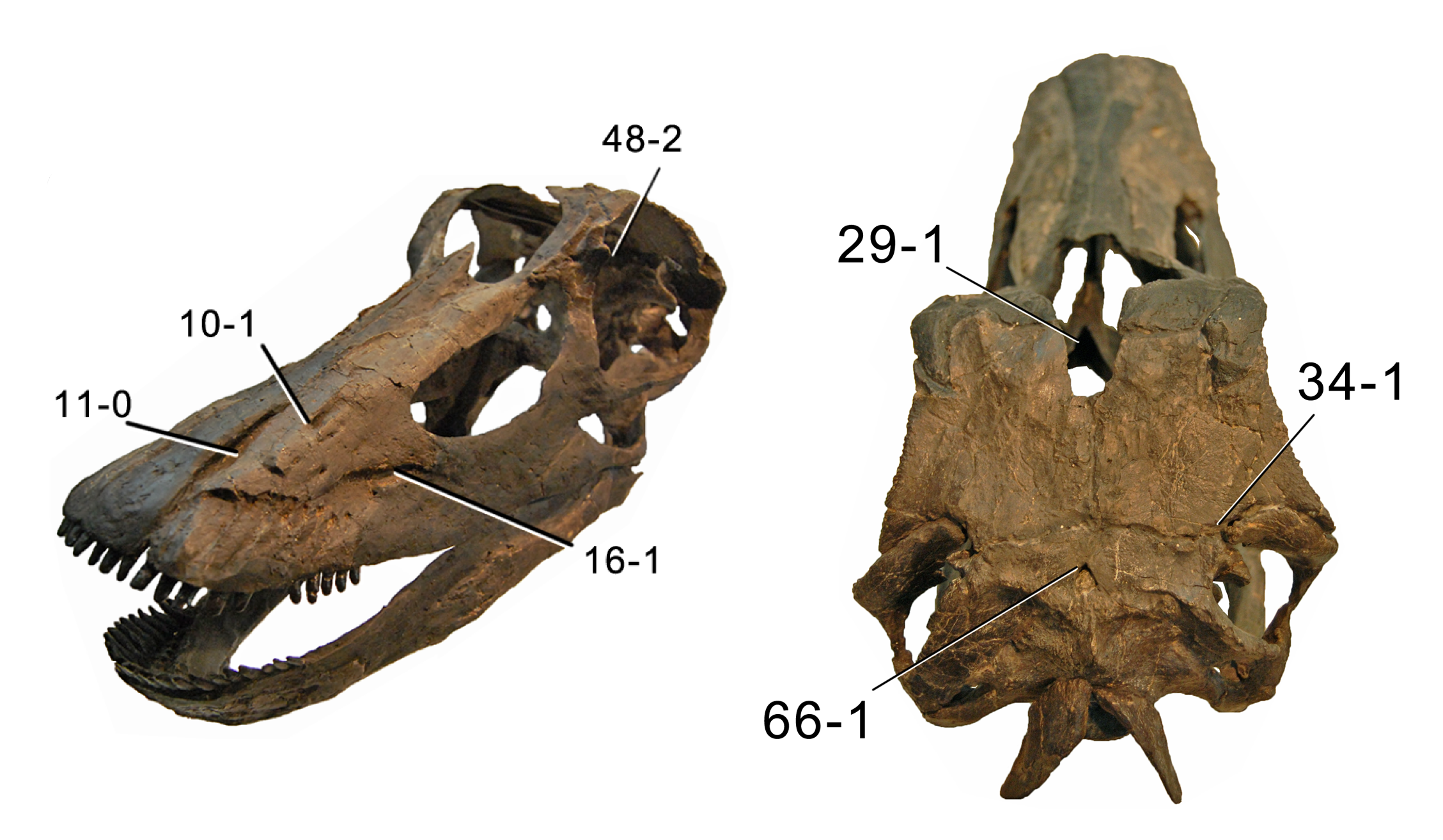
Skull SMA 0004 from two angles

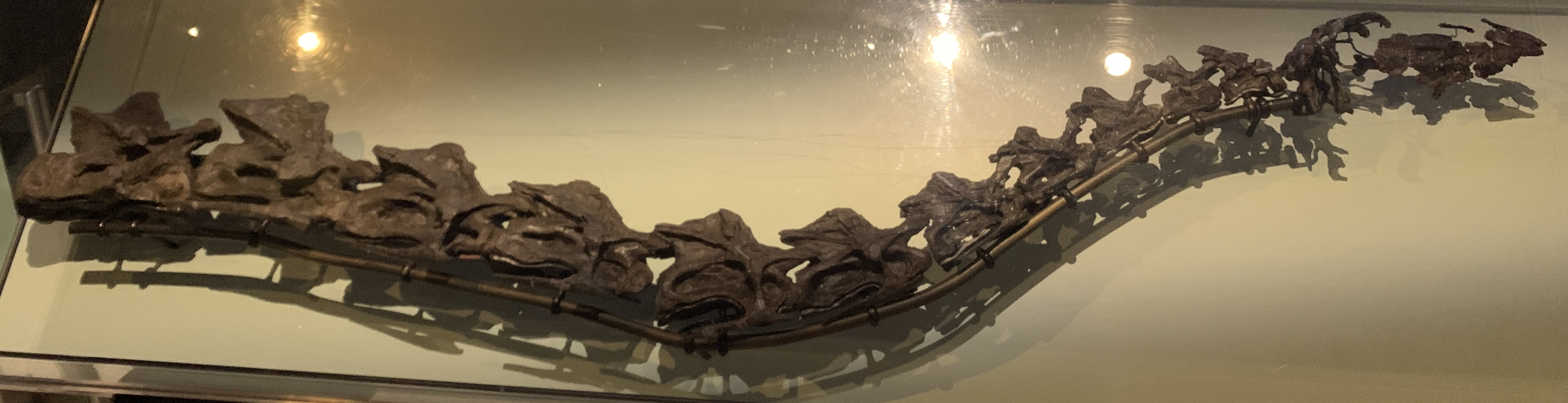
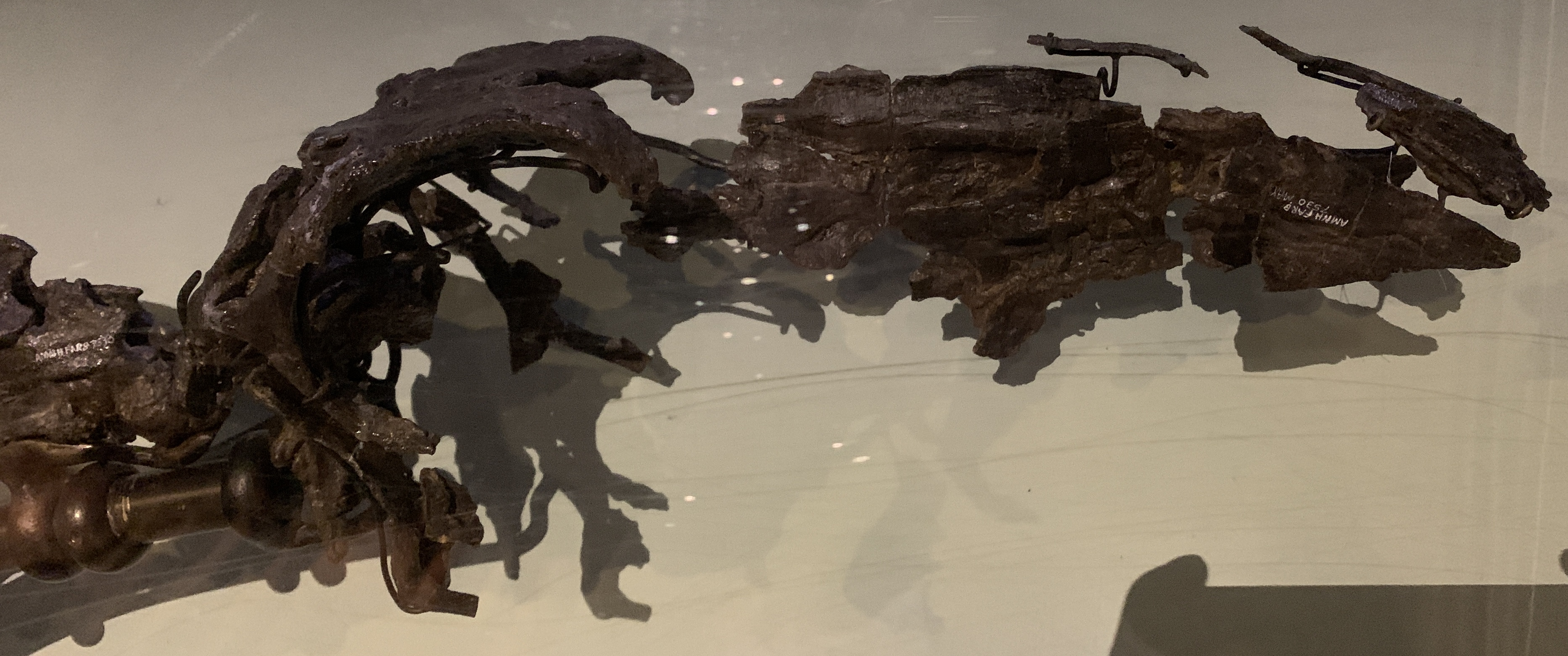
AMNH FARB 7530, a juvenile specimen.

In 1934, a team of the American Museum of Natural History (AMNH) headed by Barnum Brown, financed by the Sinclair Oil Corporation, uncovered about three thousand sauropod bones on the land of rancher Barker Howe near Shell, in Big Horn County. Plans for further excavations in 1935 had to be cancelled after Howe, convinced by the large publicity surrounding the find that the remains were very valuable, demanded higher payment. The bones would not be described and most of them were lost in a fire at the AMNH during the 1940s; others were thrown away in the 1960s after having rotted because of being stowed in a chicken run at Shell. Only about 10% of the fossils survived, among them a skull. They were generally interpreted as belonging to Barosaurus. In 2015, based on specimen-level phylogenetic analysis, one of these specimens (AMNH FARB 7530) was reinterpreted to belong to Kaatedocus.

In 1989 the site was reopened by Hans-Jakob Siber, the founder of the Swiss Aathal Dinosaur Museum. His team immediately adjacent to the old Howe Quarry discovered another 450 bones that became part of the collection of the Swiss museum.

Size comparison with a human

The finds included an exceptionally complete neck, specimen SMA 004 In Switzerland, this became the subject of several lines of scientific investigation. In 2005 Daniela Schwarz studied the pneumatisation of the vertebrae by tomography scanning them with neutrons and X-rays. In 2010 Andreas Christian used the well-preserved vertebrae to support his hypothesis that sauropod necks were held in a rather upright position, which was confirmed by Armin Schmitt studying the vestibular system of Kaatedocus. In 2012 Tschopp used a scan to create a replica of the neck by means of a 3D-printer.

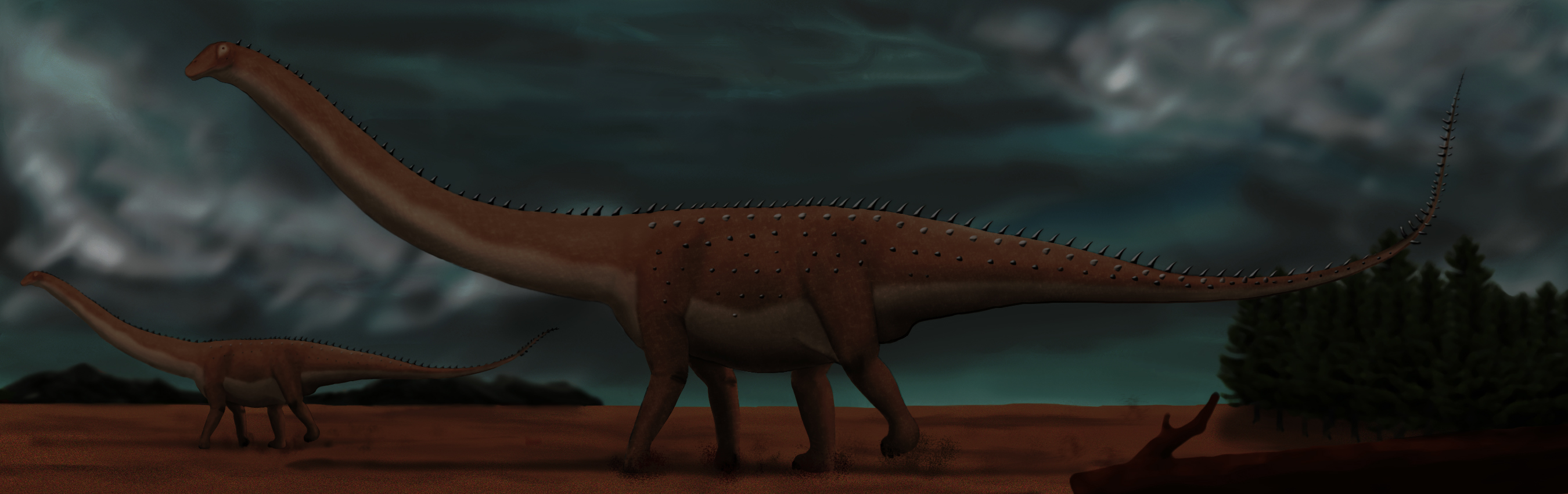
Life restoration

During the intense study of the fossils it became clear that they did not represent Barosaurus but a species new to science. In 2012 this was named Kaatedocus siberi, by the Swiss palaeontologist Emanuel Tschopp, who as a boy had visited the excavations, and his Portuguese colleague Octávio Mateus. The generic name, which means "small beam", combines a reference to the related form Diplodocus with a Crow Indian diminutive suffix ~kaate. The specific name honours Siber.

An additional specimen consisting of a braincase from the Aathal Dinosaur Museum collection (SMA D16-3) was referred to Kaatedocus in 2013, and its referral was corroborated in 2015 based on an exhaustive phylogenetic analysis.

== Description ==
Kaatedocus was relatively small compared to most diplodocids. The type individual was estimated to have been approximately 14 metres (46 ft) long. The combined length of the skull and neck is approximately 3.8 metres (12 ft). The neck was composed of at least 14 vertebrae, comparable to the typical number in diplodocids.

== Classification ==
Tschopp, Mateus, and Benson (2015) found Kaatedocus to be an advanced member of the Diplodocinae, closely related to Barosaurus, as shown below.

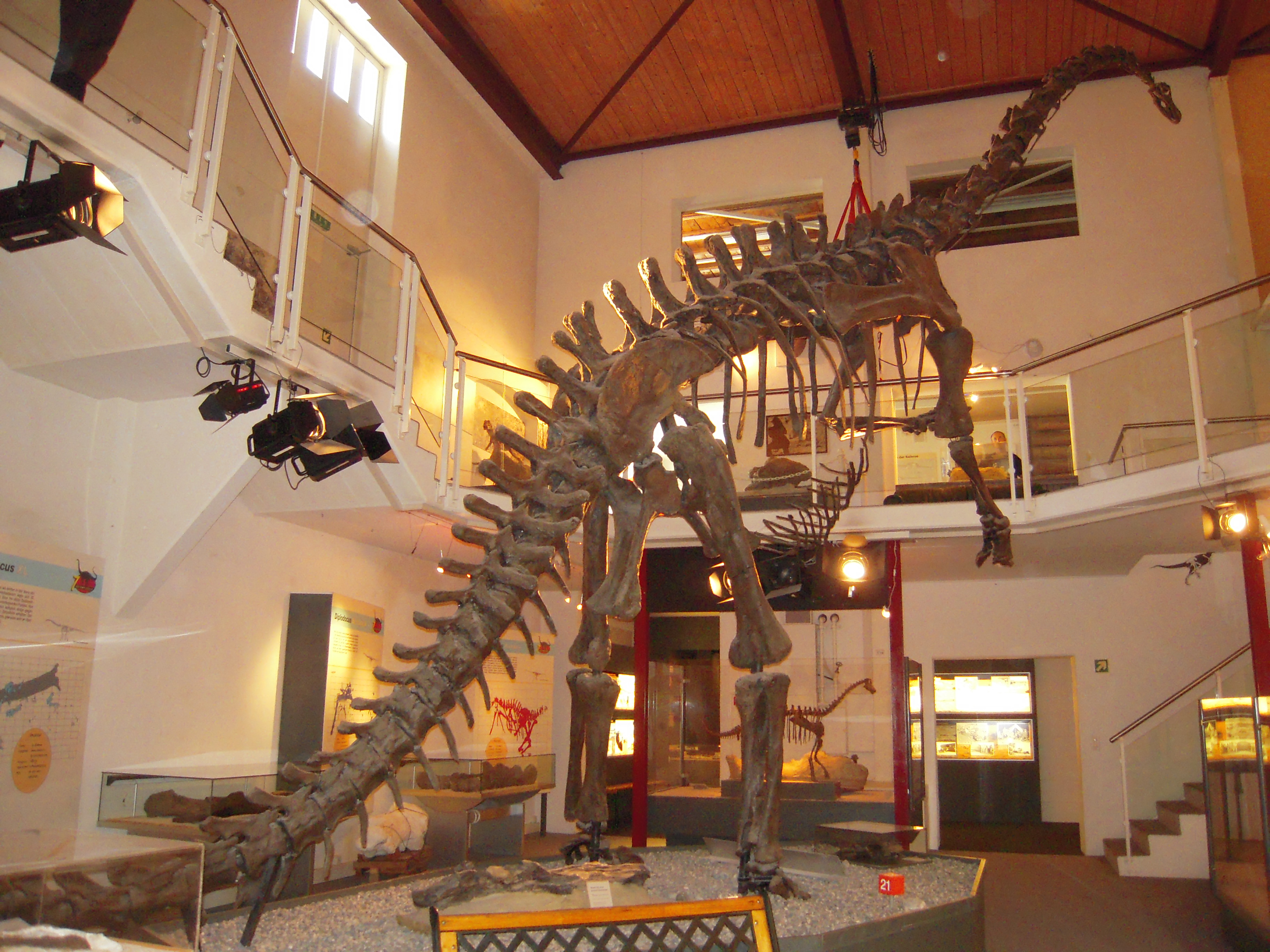
Skeleton mounted in rearing posture, Sauriermuseum Aathal

- Diplodocidae
  - Amphicoelias altus
  - - Apatosaurinae
      - Unnamed species
      - - - Apatosaurus ajax
          - Apatosaurus louisae
        - - Brontosaurus excelsus
          - - Brontosaurus yahnahpin
            - Brontosaurus parvus
    - Diplodocinae
      - Unnamed species
      - - Tornieria africana
        - - - Supersaurus lourinhanensis
            - Supersaurus vivianae
          - - Leinkupal laticauda
            - - Galeamopus hayi
              - - - Diplodocus carnegii
                  - Diplodocus hallorum
                - - Kaatedocus siberi
                  - Barosaurus lentus

On the other hand, Whitlock and Wilson (2020) find Kaatedocus to be the most basal dicraeosaurid, finding such a position more likely than being a diplodocid. The position of Kaatedocus is supported by many cranial features, which are only found within Diplodocoidea. The cladogram of the analysis is shown below:

- Dicraeosauridae
  - Kaatedocus
  - - Smitanosaurus
    - - - Bajadasaurus
        - - Lingwulong
          - MOR 592
      - - - Amargatitanis
          - Suuwassea
        - - Pilmatueia
          - - Dicraeosaurus
            - - Amargasaurus
              - Brachytrachelopan

To support their analysis, Whitlock and Wilson evaluated the characters that Kaatedocus supposedly shared with Diplodocidae: "antorbital fenestra with concave dorsal margin; a 'hooked' prefrontal; box-like basal tubera; and the elongate coel on posterior cervical neural spines." They found the first character to be a more general character diagnostic of Flagellicaudata, because it is currently unknown if dicraeosaurids possessed this feature. They believed that the second character, the hooked prefrontal, was incorrectly interpreted, and that the prefrontal is actually linear, similar to Dicraeosaurus. The presence of a box-like basal tubera was excluded as a character from their analysis because the original intent of the character was to distinguish Diplodocus and Apatosaurus, but in its current form, all other taxa exhibit intermediate morphologies. Lastly, the fourth character was also dismissed because it was unclear in its current definition and varied along the spinal column of all diplodocid taxa. Additionally, they independently test their results by conducting a supplemental analysis utilizing a modified dataset of Mannion et al. (2019) which also recovered Kaatedocus within Dicraeosauridae.
