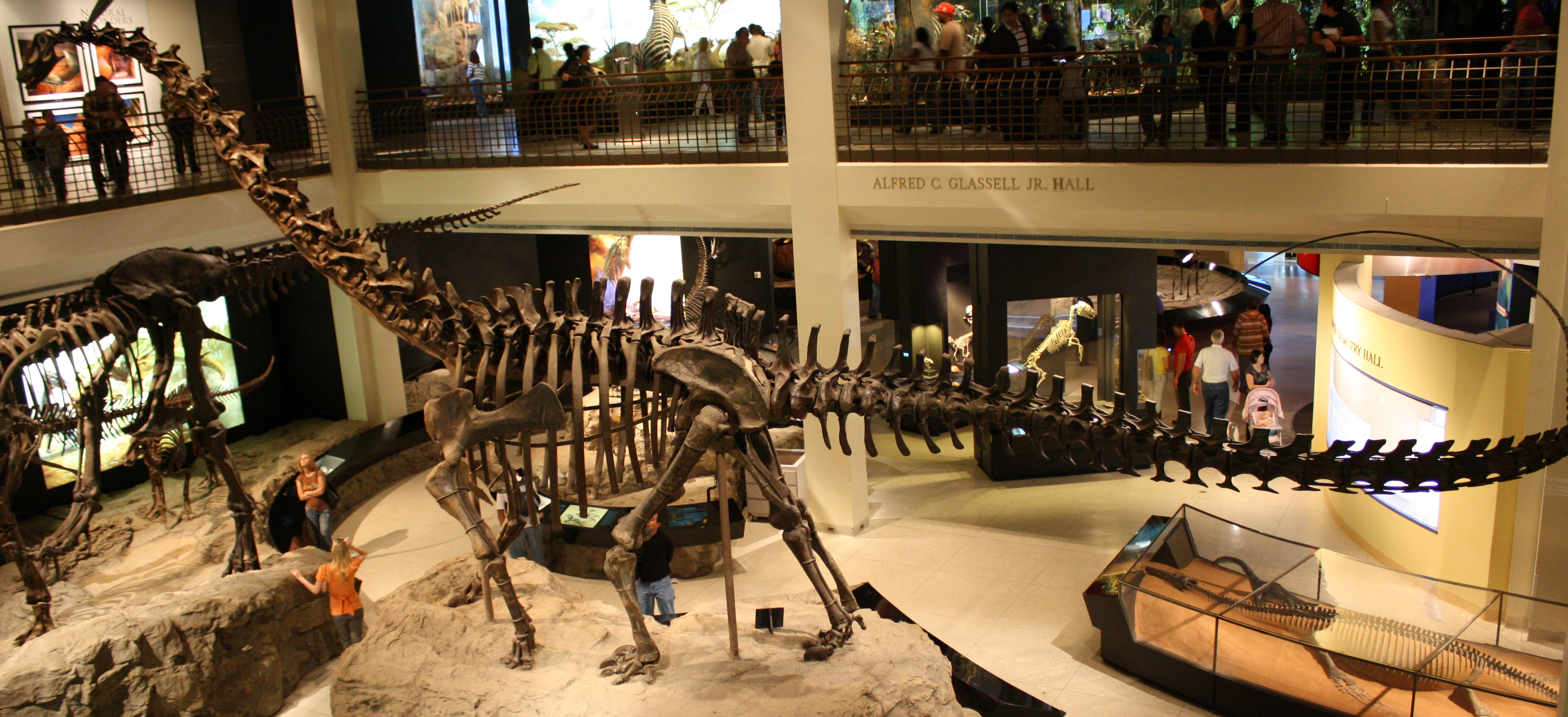
- Skeleton of Galeamopus

Scientific classification
- Kingdom: Animalia
- Phylum: Chordata
- Class: Reptilia
- Clade: Dinosauria
- Clade: Saurischia
- Clade: †Sauropodomorpha
- Clade: †Sauropoda
- Superfamily: †Diplodocoidea
- Family: †Diplodocidae
- Subfamily: †Diplodocinae; Janensch, 1929

Genera
- †Ardetosaurus; †Barosaurus; †Dinheirosaurus; †Diplodocus; †Galeamopus; †Kaatedocus?; †Leinkupal; †Supersaurus; †Tornieria

= Diplodocinae =

Diplodocines Temporal range: Late Jurassic to Early Cretaceous, 155–136.4 Ma

Extinct subfamily of dinosaurs

Diplodocinae is an extinct subfamily of diplodocid sauropods that existed from the Late Jurassic to Early Cretaceous of North America, Europe, Africa and South America, about 161.2 to 136.4 million years ago. Genera within the subfamily include Tornieria, Supersaurus, Leinkupal, Galeamopus, Diplodocus, Barosaurus, and Ardetosaurus.

Cladogram of the Diplodocidae after Tschopp, Mateus, and Benson (2015).

- Diplodocidae
  - Amphicoelias altus
  - - Apatosaurinae
    - Diplodocinae
      - Unnamed species
      - - Tornieria africana
        - - - Supersaurus lourinhanensis
            - Supersaurus vivianae
          - - Leinkupal laticauda
            - - Galeamopus hayi
              - - - Diplodocus carnegii
                  - Diplodocus hallorum
                - - Kaatedocus siberi
                  - Barosaurus lentus
