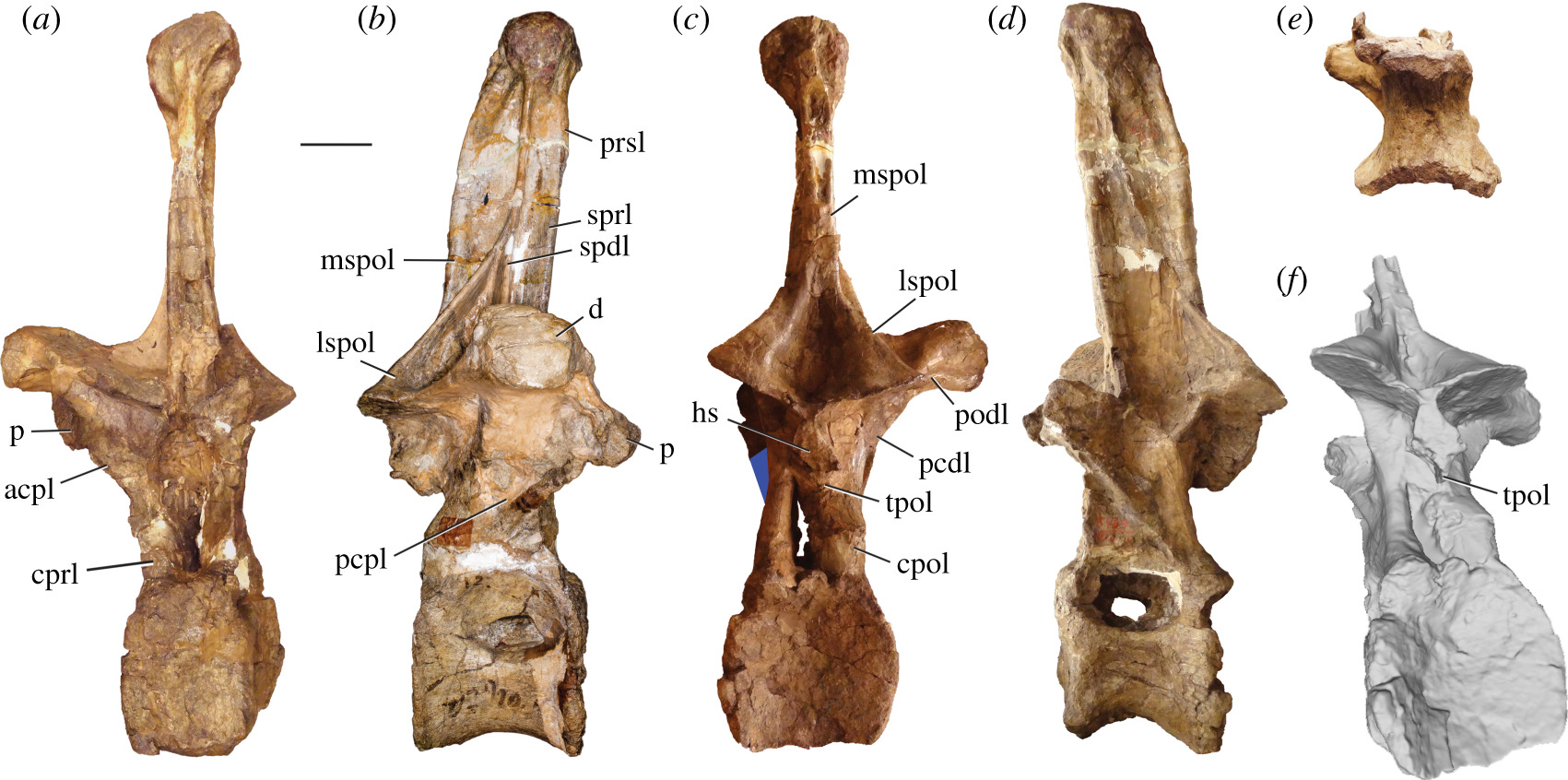
- Holotype vertebrae of A. altus, AMNH 5764

Scientific classification
- Kingdom: Animalia
- Phylum: Chordata
- Class: Reptilia
- Clade: Dinosauria
- Clade: Saurischia
- Clade: †Sauropodomorpha
- Clade: †Sauropoda
- Superfamily: †Diplodocoidea
- Genus: †Amphicoelias; Cope, 1878
- Species: †A. altus

Binomial name
- †Amphicoelias altus Cope, 1878

= Amphicoelias =

Amphicoelias Temporal range: Late Jurassic, 150 Ma

Extinct genus of dinosaurs

Amphicoelias (/ˌæmfɪˈsiːliəs/, meaning "biconcave", from the Greek ἀμφί, amphi: "on both sides", and κοῖλος, koilos: "hollow, concave") is a genus of herbivorous sauropod dinosaur that lived approximately 150 million years ago during the Tithonian (Late Jurassic Period) of what is now Colorado, United States. Amphicoelias was moderately sized at about 18 metres (59 ft) in length and 15 metric tons (17 short tons) in body mass, shorter than its close relative Diplodocus. Its hindlimbs were very long and thin, and its forelimbs were proportionally longer than in relatives.

The namesake fossil of the type species Amphicoelias altus, American Museum of Natural History (AMNH) 5764, is uncertain in included material. When described by Edward Drinker Cope shortly after its discovery in 1877, Amphicoelias was noted to include many back vertebrae, a single pubis, and a femur. However, after purchase and cataloging of the material by the AMNH, Henry Fairfield Osborn and Charles Mook described that the specimen had only two vertebrae, a pubis, femur, tooth, scapula, coracoid, ulna and a second femur. The additional material, not mentioned by Cope, was found close in proximity to the holotype and was similar to Diplodocus, a relative of Amphicoelias. Their assignment was questioned by subsequent authors Emanuel Tschopp et al. in an analysis of Diplodocidae.

During the description of Amphicoelias altus in 1877, Cope additionally named A. latus, for a femur and tail vertebrae. Following its description, Osborn and Mook in 1921 reidentified the material as a specimen of Camarasaurus, an assignment followed by other authors who reviewed the material. A year later 1878, Cope named the third species of Amphicoelias, A. fragillimus for a gigantic dorsal vertebra that was subsequently lost. Measuring approximately 2.7 m (8.9 ft) if reconstructed based on Diplodocus, early estimates for the length of the animal in life were between 40 and 60 m (130 and 200 ft) long. Due to the incomplete nature, such lengths–the longest of any known dinosaur and sauropod–were largely ignored. In 2018, Kenneth Carpenter renamed Amphicoelias fragillimus as the new genus Maraapunisaurus, and reclassified it from Diplodocidae to Rebbachisauridae.

== Discovery and history ==
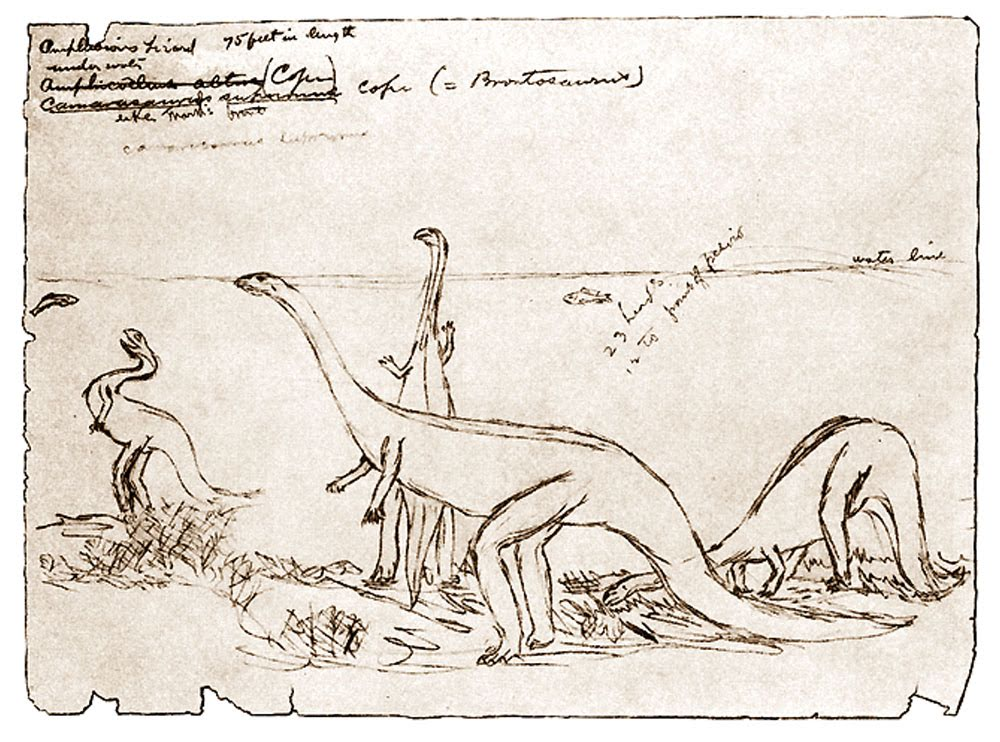
E.D. Cope's original sketch of Amphicoelias altus as an "amphibious lizard", c. 1897

In 1877, a number of fossils were discovered by Oramel William Lucas in rock outcrops in Colorado close to Cañon City. These bones, including some named Laelaps trihedrodon, Camarasaurus supremus and Caulodon, were assumed to be from the Cretaceous-era Dakota Formation by paleontologist Edward Drinker Cope, from the same age as other Laelaps fossils. Among the assortment of fossils discovered, a specimen including multiple dorsal vertebrae, a pubis, and a femur was found by Aaron Ripley, Lucas' brother-in-law, in Quarry XII. They were sent to Cope on October 21, 1877. Cope concluded they belonged to a new taxon within Sauropoda, which Cope named Amphicoelias altus in December 1877. Cope determined that the taxon would have been a sauropod related to Camarasaurus found nearby, both being large animals with lightly built vertebrae and solid limbs. Cope sold his collection of fossils to the American Museum of Natural History (AMNH) in 1895. Shortly before his death in 1897, he worked with the museum's artist Charles R. Knight to produce illustrations and paintings depicting some of his species in life, including Amphicoelias. Based on notes accompanying his sketches provided to Knight as reference material, Cope evidently considered both Amphicoelias and Brontosaurus junior synonyms of Camarasaurus supremus at this time. The specimen was given the accession number AMNH 5764, then including two dorsals, a pubis, a femur, a tooth, a scapula, coracoid and an ulna. While the forelimb material was not originally assigned to Amphicoelias, paleontologists Henry Fairfield Osborn and Charles Mook in 1921 added them to the holotype specimen on the basis that they were found in the same strata not far away, and bore differences from the Camarasaurus they were found alongside. Because of the uncertainty about the referral of these remains, in 2015 Emanuel Tschopp and colleagues hesitantly rejected the referral of the tooth, scapula and coracoid, but accepted the ulna referral. Based on collection data, the specimen was determined to have come from the Late Jurassic-era Morrison Formation, in the youngest layers, separate from those that held the Camarasaurus fossils also described by Cope.

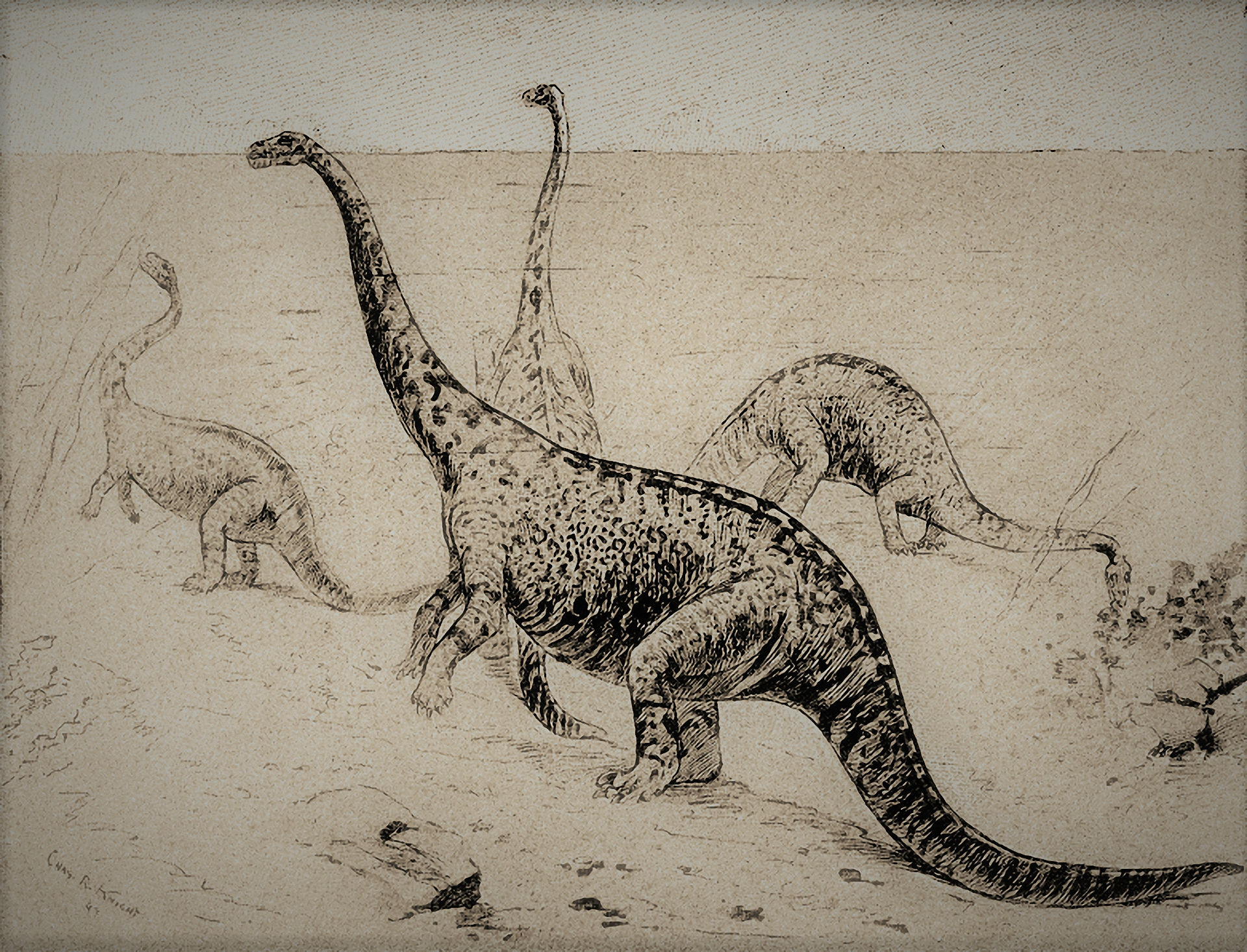
1897 restoration of aquatic A. altus, by Charles R. Knight, based on Cope's original

Cope listed multiple features to separate Amphicoelias and A. altus from their relatives. Unlike in Camarasaurus, the centra of dorsals did not have an opisthocoely, where the front end has a ball that fits into the socket of the preceding vertebra. Instead, Amphicoelias had amphicoelous vertebrae, where both ends are mildly to moderately concave. Because of this difference, Cope named two separate families to contain the different morphs of vertebral centra, one being Camarasauridae and the other being Amphicoeliidae. As well, Camarasaurus possessed pleurocoels (openings in the side of the centrum) that were taller than long-contrasting to the condition in Amphicoelias- and a more robust pubis and femur. However, both families also had accessory articulations in the neural arch, which Cope termed the hyposphene, limiting the motion of vertebrae respective to one another. Amphicoeliidae and Amphicoelias were both found to be intermediate and poorly defined by paleontologist Othniel Charles Marsh in 1881, wherein the primary feature-two mildly concave articular faces-was shown to be widespread and also found in sauropods like Brontosaurus excelsus.

=== Previously assigned species ===
Amphicoelias latus was named in the same description as the type species, Amphicoelias altus. It was named for a series of four caudal vertebrae and a femur (AMNH 5765), in relatively good preservation. The caudals are bi-concave like the dorsals of A. altus, with short centra, long prezygapophyses and shallow pleurocoels. The femur is extremely robust, as well as being wide but short front-to-back. The femur is 1.4 m (4.6 ft) long, but the very proximal end is not fully preserved. Due to the robusticity of the femur Osborn & Mook in 1921 referred Amphicoelias latus to Camarasaurus supremus, making C. supremus the valid name for the material once called A. latus.

The third named Amphicoelias species, A. fragillimus, was known only from a single, incomplete 1.5 m (4.9 ft) tall neural arch, either last or second to last in the series of back vertebrae. Based only on an illustration published in 1878, this vertebra would have measured 2.7 meters (8.9 ft) tall in life. However, it has been argued that the scale bar in the published description contained a typographical error, and the fossil vertebra was in fact only 1.38 meters (4.5 ft) tall. In addition to this vertebra, Cope's field notes contain an entry for an "[i]mmense distal end of femur”, located only a few tens of meters away from the giant vertebra. It is likely that this undescribed leg bone belonged to the same individual animal as the neural spine, but it was never collected or described. In 2018, A. fragillimus was given its own genus, Maraapunisaurus, and reclassified as a primitive rebbachisaurid.

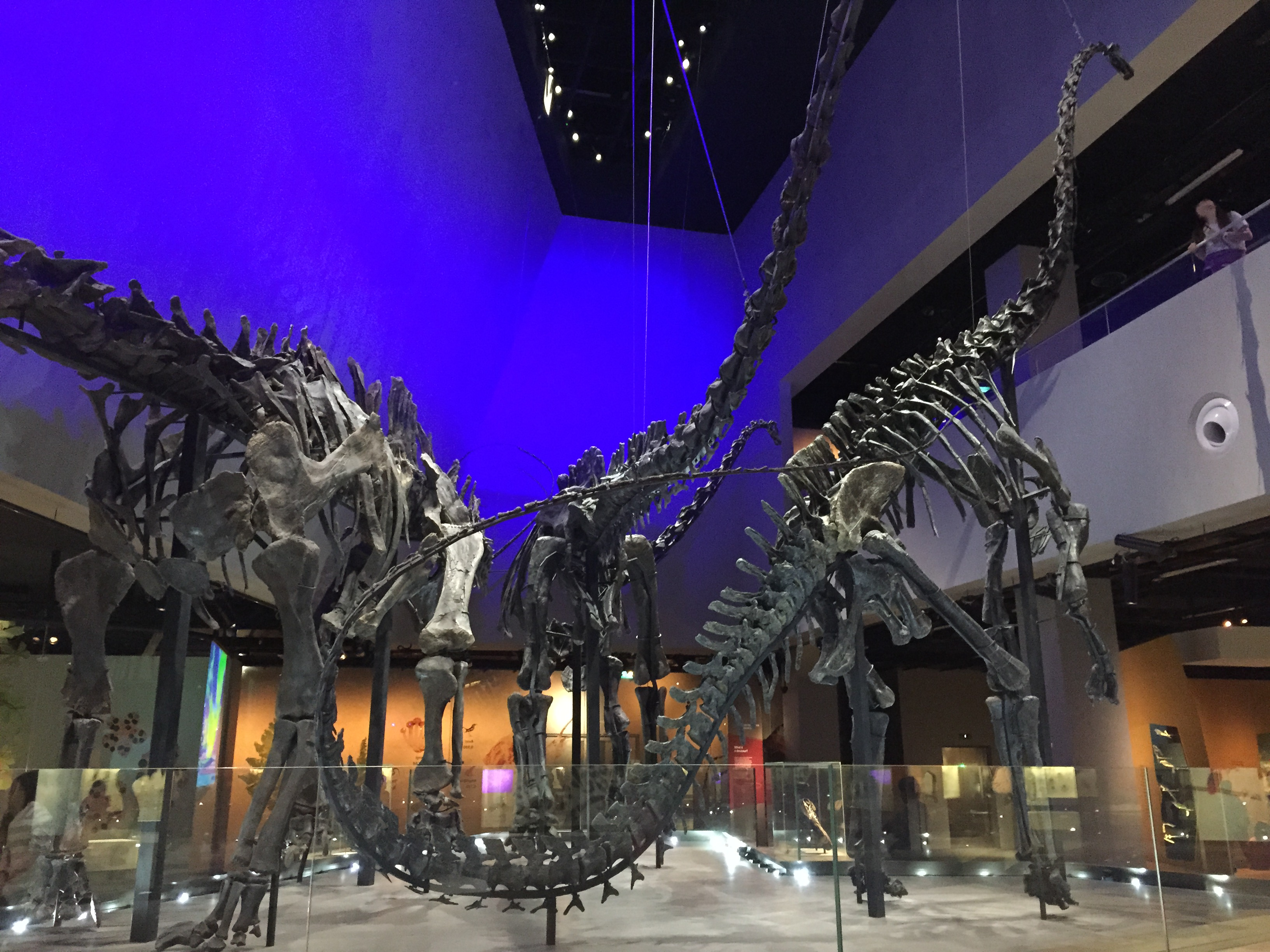
Three skeletons informally assigned to "A. brontodiplodocus" in 2010, now labelled as diplodocids in Lee Kong Chian Natural History Museum, Singapore

In 2010, an article was made available, but not formally published, by Henry Galiano and Raimund Albersdorfer in which they referred to the new species "A. brontodiplodocus" to Amphicoelias, based on several complete specimens found in the Dana Quarry of Big Horn Basin, Wyoming and held in a private collection. The specific name referred to their hypothesis based on these specimens that nearly all Morrison diplodocid species are either growth stages or represent sexual dimorphism among members of the genus Amphicoelias, but this analysis has been met with skepticism and the publication itself has been disclaimed by its lead author, explaining that it is "obviously a drafted manuscript complete with typos, etc., and not a final paper. In fact, no printing or distribution has been attempted".

Osborn and Mook, in 1921, provisionally synonymized A. fragillimus with A. altus, while sinking A. latus into Camarasaurus supremus, and suggesting also that A. fragillimus is just a very large individual of A. altus, a position that most subsequent studies, including McIntosh 1998, Foster (2007), and Woodruff and Foster (2015) have agreed with. Carpenter (2006) disagreed about the synonymy of A. altus and A. fragillimus, however, citing numerous differences in the construction of the vertebra also noted by Cope, and suggested these differences are enough to warrant a separate species or even a separate genus for A. fragillimus. However, he went on to caution that the validity of A. fragillimus as a separate species is nearly impossible to determine without the original specimen to study. Although Amphicoelias latus is clearly not Amphicoelias, it is probably synonymous with Camarasaurus grandis rather than C. supremus because it was found lower in the Morrison Formation and the deeply concave articular faces on the caudal vertebrae are more consistent with C. grandis.

== Description ==
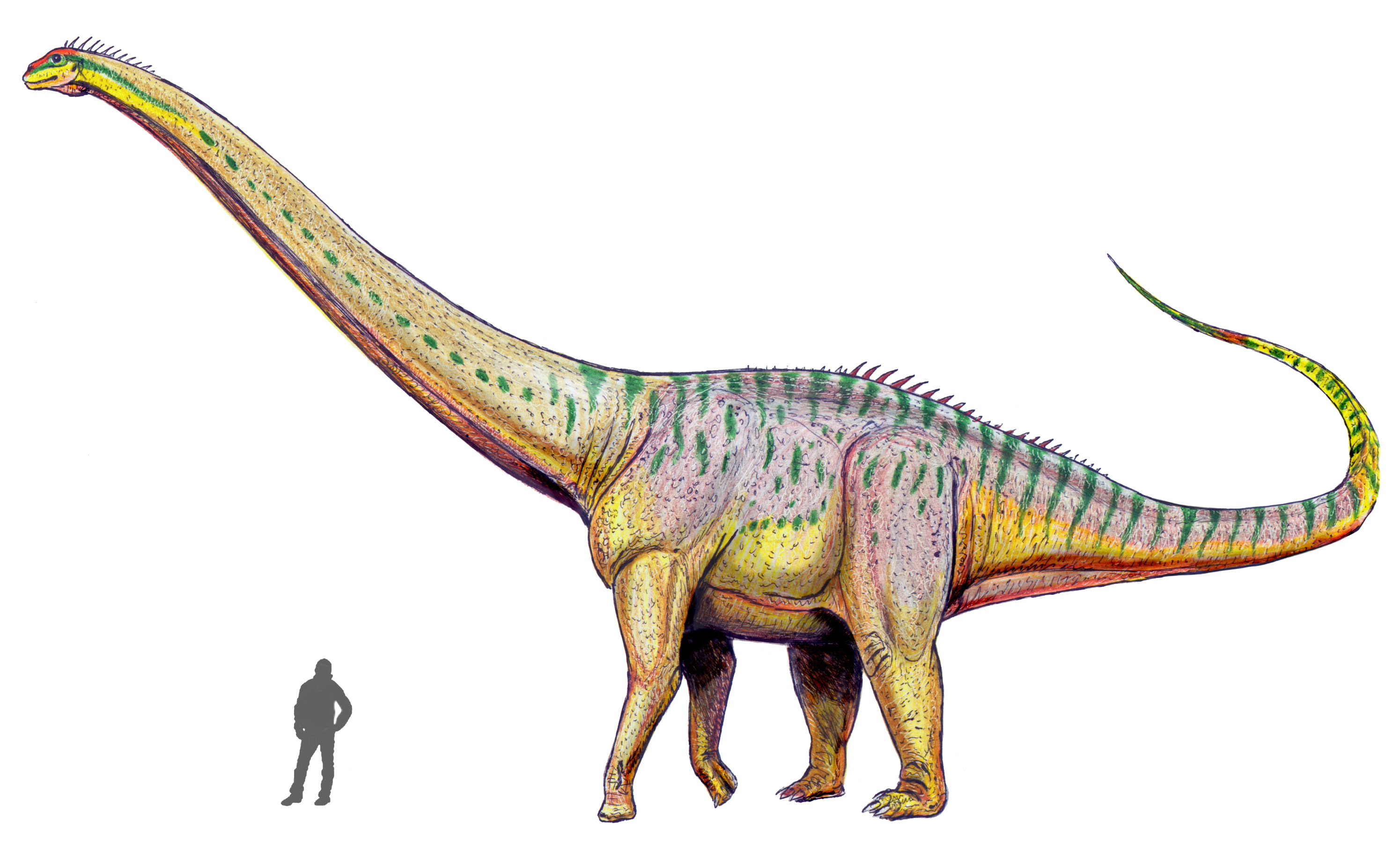
Restoration of A. altus

Henry Fairfield Osborn and Charles Craig Mook noted the overall close similarity between Amphicoelias and Diplodocus, as well as a few key differences, such as proportionally longer forelimbs in Amphicoelias than in Diplodocus. The femur of Amphicoelias is unusually long, slender, and round in cross section; while this roundness was once thought to be another distinguishing characteristic of Amphicoelias, it has since been found in some specimens of Diplodocus as well. Gregory S. Paul initially estimated A. altus to be similar in size to Diplodocus at 25 metres (82 ft) in length, but later moderated its size at 18 metres (59 ft) in length and 15 metric tons (17 short tons) in body mass.

The dorsal vertebrae of Amphicoelias are partly incomplete, but their anatomy is discernible from the known remains. The centrum is very compressed in the middle in all dimensions, with a large lateral pleurocoel set inside a large lateral fossa. In Amphicoelias the neural arch is very tall, and along its side there is a prominent lamina extending from the posterior centrum to the prezygapophyses (articular surfaces with the neural arch of the preceding vertebra). From directly behind the prezygapophyses, the diapophyes (lateral processes for rib articulation) project slightly upwards and outwards, surrounded by shallow fossae and a large lamina extending up the neural spine. The neural spine is thin, with a pair of ridges going up along either side on the edges. The distal end is wide compared to the main spine, but approximately subequal in length and width.

A partial forelimb, provisionally referred to Amphicoelias by Osborn & Mook in 1921, resembles Diplodocus but is more robust overall. The distal end of the scapula, while only partially preserved, show that the expansion of the scapula blade was smaller than Camarasaurus but larger than Apatosaurus. 161 cm (63 in) long as preserved, the bone is noticeably thicker than in Diplodocus, but not quite as thick as in Camarasaurus. The coracoid found alongside the scapula is far more similar to Diplodocus than Camarasaurus, being round and longer than tall. However, it is also thicker than in Diplocodus. The foramen in the coracoid is large and centered on the short axis of the bone. The ulna is more elongate than any comparable bone known from Diplocodus. It has prominent articular faces for the humerus and radius, and narrows toward the incomplete distal end.

The pubis of Amphicoelias is very fragmentary, and the only discernible characteristics are that it is long but thick, and has a small surface for articulation with the ilium. A single, slender right femur of Amphicoelias is known from the holotype, 1.524 m (5 ft) long. It is slightly longer than the femur of Camarasaurus supremus, but significantly less robust, being approximately round in cross-section and only 22 cm (8.7 in) wide. The shaft of the femur is gently curved towards the hip articulation, and straight close to the prominent articular condyles. A second, partial left femur was also found in the collections of the AMNH, and was assigned to the holotype specimen, while it was not mentioned by Cope. It lacks a majority of the upper bone, but the known shaft and end are very similar to the one figured by Cope, and it may be the left femur of the same individual.

== Classification ==
In 2007, John Foster suggested that the differences usually cited to differentiate Amphicoelias altus from the more well known Diplodocus are not significant and may be due to individual variation. Foster argued that Amphicoelias is probably the senior synonym of Diplodocus, and that if further research bears this out, the familiar name Diplodocus would need to be abandoned in favor of Amphicoelias, as was the case with Brontosaurus and its senior synonym Apatosaurus. In 2015, Woodruff and Foster reiterated this conclusion, stating that there is only one species of Amphicoelias and that it could be referred to Diplodocus as Diplodocus altus. They considered the name Amphicoelias to be a nomen oblitum. This conclusion was disputed by Emanuel Tschopp et al. in 2015, where Amphicoelias was analysed as part of an extensive specimen-level phylogenetic analysis of Diplodocidae. There were two strongly supported placements found for Amphicoelias, as the basalmost genus within Apatosaurinae, and as an apatosaurine nested between Brontosaurus excelsus and Brontosaurus yahnahpin. There were no unambiguous characters found to support an assignment within Apatosaurinae, so the authors instead opted to classify Amphicoelias as the basalmost diplodocid outside Apatosaurinae and Diplodocinae, having primitive features, minimal significant differences from either subfamily, a slightly more parsimonious apatosaurine phylogeny, but a slightly more diplodocine morphology. The following cladogram of the Diplodocidae follows the species-level agreement tree of Tschopp et al. (2015) showing A. altus as the basalmost diplodocid.

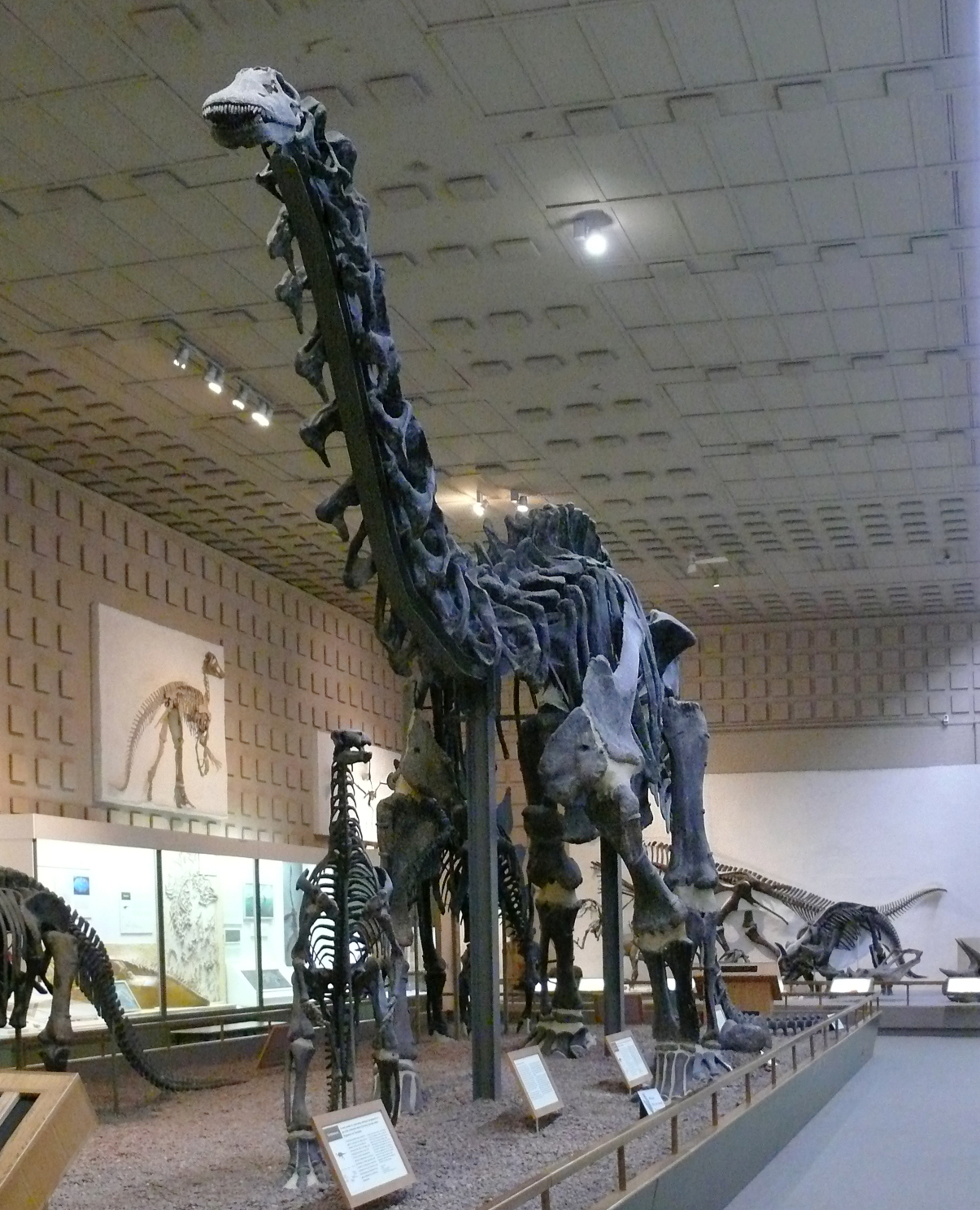
Skeletal mount of potentially closely related Brontosaurus excelsus holotype YPM 1980

- Diplodocidae
  - Amphicoelias altus
  - - Apatosaurinae
      - Unnamed species
      - - - Apatosaurus ajax
          - Apatosaurus louisae
        - - Brontosaurus excelsus
          - - Brontosaurus yahnahpin
            - Brontosaurus parvus
    - Diplodocinae
      - Unnamed species
      - - Tornieria africana
        - - - Dinheirosaurus lourinhanensis
            - Supersaurus vivianae
          - - Leinkupal laticauda
            - - Galeamopus hayi
              - - - Diplodocus carnegii
                  - Diplodocus hallorum
                - - Kaatedocus siberi
                  - Barosaurus lentus

In their 2021 phylogenetic analyses, Mannion, Tschopp and Whitlock recovered Amphicoelias within various positions among Diplodocoidea, and considered its placement as a non-diplodocimorph diplodocoid position to be the most parsimonious one. In 2025, Mannion and Moore also recovered similar results in their phylogenetic analyses, with various placements of Amphicoelias within the clade all being considered parsimonious.

== Paleoecology ==
In his 2006 re-evaluation, Carpenter examined the paleobiology of giant sauropods, including Amphicoelias, and addressed the question of why this group attained such a huge size. He pointed out that gigantic sizes were reached early in sauropod evolution, with very large sized species present as early as the late Triassic period, and concluded that whatever evolutionary pressure caused large size was present from the early origins of the group. Carpenter cited several studies of giant mammalian herbivores, such as elephants and rhinoceros, which showed that larger size in plant-eating animals leads to greater efficiency in digesting food. Since larger animals have longer digestive systems, food is kept in digestion for significantly longer periods of time, allowing large animals to survive on lower-quality food sources. This is especially true of animals with a large number of 'fermentation chambers' along the intestine, which allow microbes to accumulate and ferment plant material, aiding digestion. Throughout their evolutionary history, sauropod dinosaurs were found primarily in semi-arid, seasonally dry environments, with a corresponding seasonal drop in the quality of food during the dry season. The environment of Amphicoelias was essentially a savanna, similar to the arid environments in which modern giant herbivores are found, supporting the idea that poor-quality food in an arid environment promotes the evolution of giant herbivores. Carpenter argued that other benefits of large size, such as relative immunity from predators, lower energy expenditure, and longer life span, are probably secondary advantages.

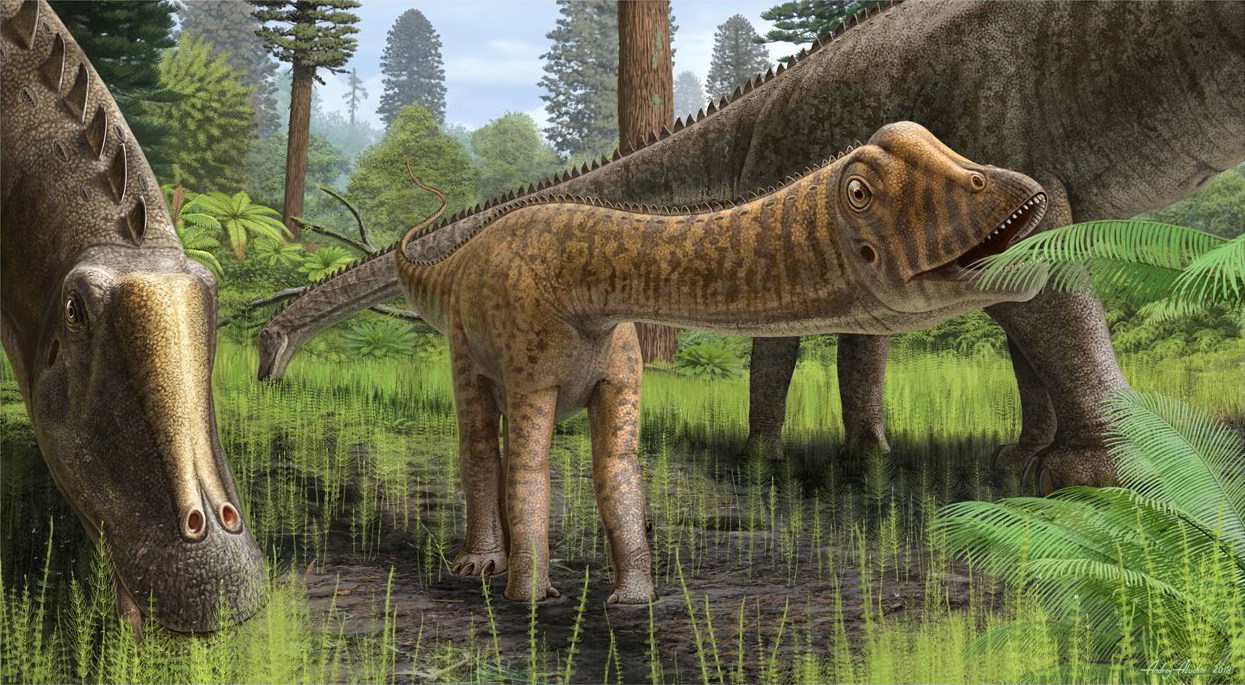
Paleoenvironment restoration of a young diplodocid feeding on ferns

The Morrison Formation environment in which Amphicoelias lived would have resembled a modern savanna, though since grasses did not appear until the Late Cretaceous, ferns were probably the dominant plant and main food source for Amphicoelias. Though Engelmann et al. (2004) dismissed ferns as a sauropod food source due to their relatively low caloric content, Carpenter argued that the sauropod digestive system, well adapted to handle low-quality food, allows for the consumption of ferns as a large part of the sauropod diet. Carpenter also noted that the occasional presence of large petrified logs indicate the presence of 20–30 m (66–98 ft) tall trees, which would seem to conflict with the savanna comparison. However, the trees are rare, and since tall trees require more water than the savanna environment could generally provide, they probably existed in narrow tracts or "gallery forests" along rivers and gulleys where water could accumulate. Carpenter speculated that giant herbivores like Amphicoelias may have used the shade of the gallery forests to stay cool during the day, and done most of their feeding on the open savanna at night.
