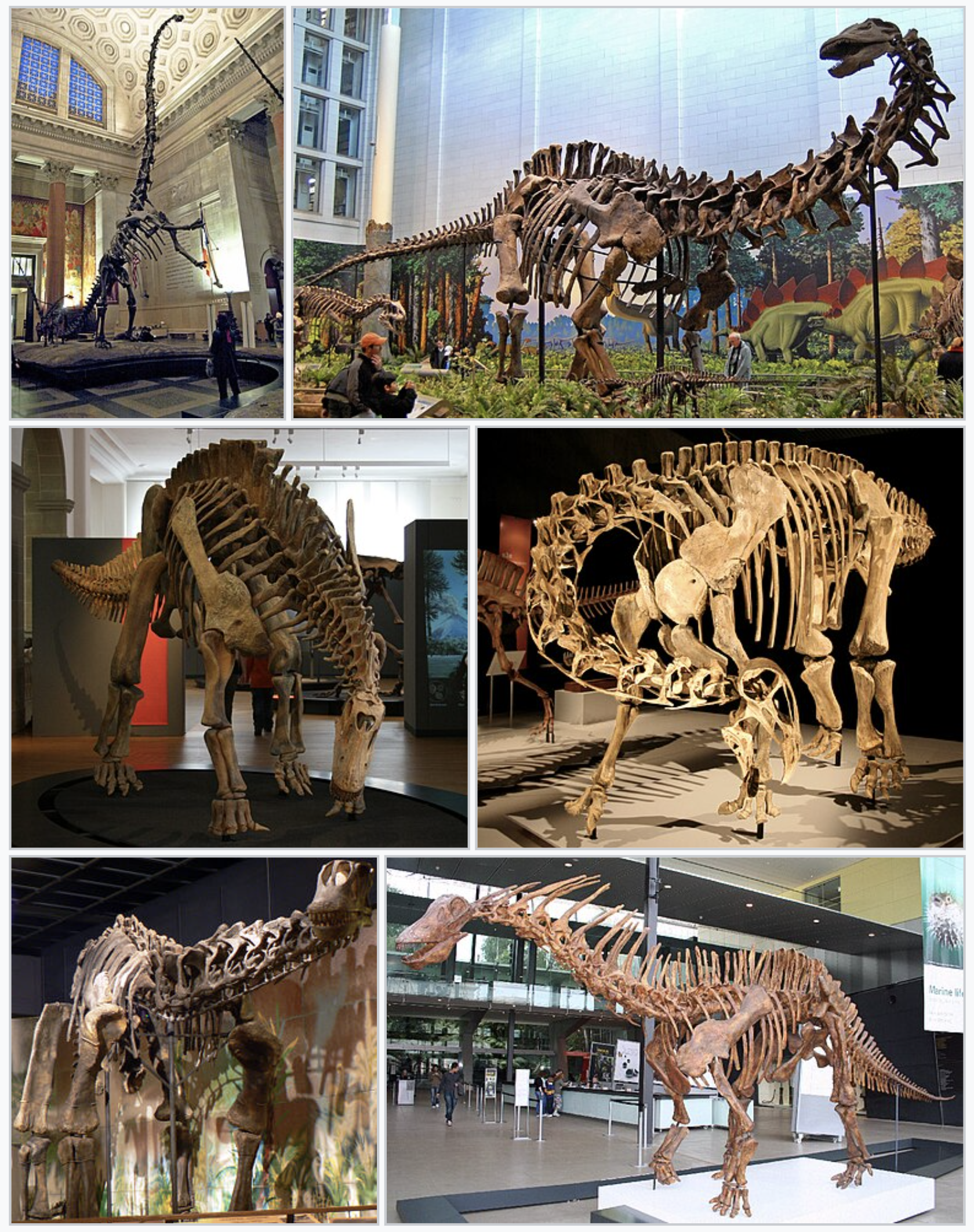
- Six diplodocoids (top left to bottom right): Barosaurus, Apatosaurus louisae, Brachytrachelopan, Nigersaurus, Haplocanthosaurus, Amargasaurus

Scientific classification
- Kingdom: Animalia
- Phylum: Chordata
- Class: Reptilia
- Clade: Dinosauria
- Clade: Saurischia
- Clade: †Sauropodomorpha
- Clade: †Sauropoda
- Clade: †Neosauropoda
- Superfamily: †Diplodocoidea; Marsh, 1884

Type species
- †Diplodocus longus Marsh, 1878

Subgroups
- †Amphicoelias; †Haplocanthosaurus; †Lingwulong; †Diplodocimorpha Calvo & Salgado, 1995; †Rebbachisauridae; †Flagellicaudata Harris & Dodson, 2004; †Kaatedocus; †Dicraeosauridae; †Diplodocidae

Synonyms
- Rebbachisauroidea Bonaparte, 1997

= Diplodocoidea =

Diplodocoids Temporal range: Middle Jurassic–Late Cretaceous, 174–90 Ma

Extinct superfamily of dinosaurs

Diplodocoidea is a superfamily of sauropod dinosaurs, which included some of the longest animals of all time, including slender giants like Supersaurus, Diplodocus, Apatosaurus, and Amphicoelias. Most had very long necks and long, whip-like tails; however, one family (the dicraeosaurids) are the only known sauropods to have re-evolved a short neck, presumably an adaptation for feeding low to the ground. This adaptation was taken to the extreme in the highly specialized sauropod Brachytrachelopan. A study of snout shape and dental microwear in diplodocoids showed that the square snouts, large proportion of pits, and fine subparallel scratches in Apatosaurus, Diplodocus, Nigersaurus, and Rebbachisaurus suggest ground-height nonselective browsing; the narrow snouts of Dicraeosaurus, Suuwassea, and Tornieria and the coarse scratches and gouges on the teeth of Dicraeosaurus suggest mid-height selective browsing in those taxa. This taxon is also noteworthy because diplodocoid sauropods had the highest tooth replacement rates of any vertebrates, as exemplified by Nigersaurus, which had new teeth erupting every 30 days.

Most diplodocoids belong to Diplodocimorpha, a name first used by Calvo & Salgado in 1995, who defined it as the last common ancestor of Rebbachisaurus tessonei and Diplodocidae and all of its descendants. The group was not used often, and was synonymized with Diplodocoidea as the groups were often found to have the same content. In 2005, Mike P. Taylor and Darren Naish reviewed diplodocoid phylogeny and taxonomy, and realized that Diplodocimorpha could not be synonymized with Diplodocoidea. Whereas the former was defined node-based, the latter was branch-based. Haplocanthosaurus and possibly Amphicoelias are non-diplodocimorph diplodocoids.

== Taxonomy ==
The clade Flagellicaudata was erected by Harris and Dodson (2004) for the diplodocoid clade formed by Dicraeosauridae and Diplodocidae in their paper describing a new genus of sauropod dinosaur, Suuwassea. The authors carried out a phylogenetic analysis and noted that Suuwassea, although more derived than Rebbachisauridae, is in a trichotomy with other families belonging to Diplodocoidea (Diplodocidae and Dicraeosauridae). Flagellicaudata was defined as a node-based clade consisting of the most recent common ancestor of Dicraeosaurus and Diplodocus and all of its descendants. The word "Flagellicaudata" refers to long, whip-like tails of that animals (flagellum is a Latin word meaning "whip" and cauda means in Latin "tail").

The phylogenetics of Diplodocoidea were reviewed in 2015 by Emanuel Tschopp, Octavio Mateus and Roger Benson with a specimen-level phylogenetic analysis, as well as a species-level analysis. Their cladistic analysis is shown below.

- Diplodocoidea
  - Haplocanthosaurus priscus
  - Diplodocimorpha
    - Rebbachisauridae
      - Zapalasaurus bonapartei
      - - Limaysaurinae
          - Cathartesaura anaerobica
          - Limaysaurus tessonei
        - Nigersaurinae
          - Nigersaurus taqueti
          - Demandasaurus darwini
    - Flagellicaudata
      - Dicraeosauridae
        - Dyslocosaurus polyonychius
        - - - Suuwassea emilieae
            - Dystrophaeus viaemalae
          - - Brachytrachelopan mesai
            - - Amargasaurus cazaui
              - Dicraeosaurus hansemanni
      - Diplodocidae
        - Amphicoelias altus
        - - Apatosaurinae
            - ?Apatosaurinae gen. et sp. nov.
            - - - Apatosaurus ajax
                - Apatosaurus louisae
              - - Brontosaurus excelsus
                - - Brontosaurus yahnahpin
                  - Brontosaurus parvus
          - Diplodocinae
            - ?Diplodocinae gen. et sp. nov.
            - - Tornieria africana
              - - - Supersaurus lourinhanensis
                  - Supersaurus vivianae
                - - Leinkupal laticauda
                  - - Galeamopus hayi
                    - - - Diplodocus carnegiei
                        - Diplodocus hallorum
                      - - Kaatedocus siberi
                        - Barosaurus lentus
