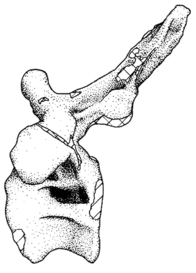
- Caudal vertebra of T. africana

Scientific classification
- Kingdom: Animalia
- Phylum: Chordata
- Class: Reptilia
- Clade: Dinosauria
- Clade: Saurischia
- Clade: †Sauropodomorpha
- Clade: †Sauropoda
- Superfamily: †Diplodocoidea
- Clade: †Flagellicaudata
- Family: †Diplodocidae
- Subfamily: †Diplodocinae
- Genus: †Tornieria; Sternfeld, 1911

Type species
- †Gigantosaurus africanus Fraas, 1908

Species
- †T. africana (Fraas, 1908); †T. gracilis (Chure & McIntosh, 1989)

Synonyms
- Genus synonymy: Gigantosaurus Fraas, 1908 (preoccupied); Species synonymy: Gigantosaurus africanus Fraas, 1908; Barosaurus africanus (Fraas, 1908); Barosaurus africanus gracilis Chure & McIntosh, 1989; Barosaurus gracilis (Chure & McIntosh, 1989)

= Tornieria =

Tornieria Temporal range: Late Jurassic

Extinct genus of dinosaur

Tornieria ("for Tornier") is a genus of diplodocid sauropod dinosaur from the Late Jurassic in Lindi Region of Tanzania.

== Discovery and naming ==
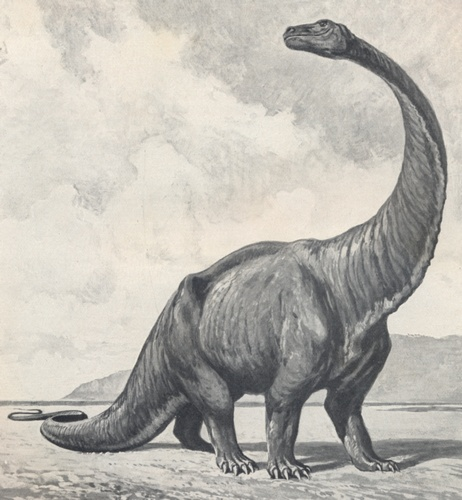
Historical reconstruction by Heinrich Harder (as "Gigantosaurus"), 1912

In 1907, German paleontologist Eberhard Fraas who was working the Tendaguru Beds in German East Africa (presently Tanzania), discovered two sauropod specimens at a single site ("Quarry A"). The two individuals, designated "Skeleton A" and "Skeleton B", each represented a different sauropod species. In 1908 he named these respectively Gigantosaurus africanus ("African giant lizard") and G. robustus ("Robust giant lizard"). A third, unrelated African species, "Gigantosaurus" dixeyi, was named by in 1928, and has since been reassigned to Malawisaurus.

However, the name Gigantosaurus had already been used for the European sauropod Gigantosaurus megalonyx Seeley, 1869. Fraas, not intending to place his species in the same genus as this English form, had believed that the name was available, since at the time the latter species was considered to be a junior synonym of Ornithopsis and Seeley in his opinion had not provided a sufficient description anyway. Another German paleontologist, Richard Sternfeld, renamed the Tanzanian sauropod Tornieria in 1911, making the two species Tornieria africana and T. robusta. The generic name honours the German herpetologist Gustav Tornier.

A re-evaluation of Tornieria in 1922 by Werner Janensch concluded that one species, T. africana, was actually an African species of the North American sauropod genus Barosaurus: Barosaurus africanus. The other African species, T. robusta, later turned out to belong to a titanosaur. The titanosaur species for a time was called Tornieria, but this was incorrect as T. africana had been the type species. It needed a generic name of its own and this was provided in 1991 when Rupert Wild renamed it Janenschia.

If Tornieria were the same genus as Barosaurus, then the name Tornieria would be abandoned as a junior subjective synonym. However, later researchers proposed generic distinction between the American and the African form. In the early 21st century this usage became prevalent and in 2006 Kristian Remes in a review concluded that Tornieria was indeed distinct and a valid genus.

A complication is formed by the fact that Janensch in 1961 recognised a variety of B. africanus: B. africanus var. gracilis, a morph distinguished by more gracile hind limbs. In 1980, Russell et al. informally promoted this taxon to the species level, Barosaurus gracilis; it was officially elevated to B. gracilis by John McIntosh in 1990, and was combined to as Tornieria gracilis by George Olshevsky in 1991.

In 2006, Remes suggested that B. gracilis is a nomen nudum, with neither the holotype nor diagnosis having been provided by Russell et al. (1980). However, Bivens, Greenfield and Curtice (2025) suggested that T. gracilis is not a nomen nudum but a validly named species, since the name has been made available by Chure & McIntosh (1989) as a subspecies of T. africana (then referred to B. a. gracilis) who explicitly credited the species' authorship to Janensch (1961), which is in accordance with the International Code of Zoological Nomenclature (ICZN) article 13.1.2; they concluded that T. gracilis is an available name with the correct authorship being Chure & McIntosh (1989) in accordance with the ICZN articles 45.5.1 and 50.1, and designated a lectotype in accordance with the ICZN articles 74.1 and 74.7.

== Specimens and description ==
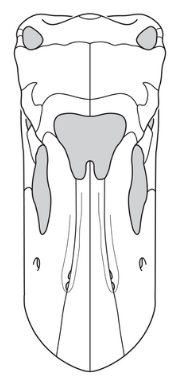
Skull of T. africana

Elements of the original "Skeleton A" were designated by Fraas as a syntype series: SMNS 12141a, 12145a, 12143, 12140, 12142, all from the postcrania. Later some other bones from the same individual were recovered. Janensch would also refer many other fossils to B. africanus, in total 630 specimens representing at least 56 separate individuals. Of these 188 would be left after the bombardments during the Second World War. Remes, however, concluded that merely a second partial skeleton, "Skeleton k", including also some skull elements, could be reliably referred, and a series of caudal vertebrae. The remains are from the later strata of the Tendaguru, the obere Dinosauriermergel or "Upper Dinosaur Marl", dating from the Tithonian.

Tornieria was a large sauropod; according to Gregory S. Paul, it was 25 m (82 ft) in length, and weighed 10 metric tons. It shared elongated neck vertebrae and a rather long forelimb with Barosaurus. However, it differed from the American form by details in the anterior caudal vertebrae and from Barosaurus and Diplodocus both by its plesiomorphic hindlimb proportions with a short lower leg.

== Classification ==
After performing a cladistic analysis, Remes (2006) concluded that Tornieria was the sister taxon of a clade formed by Barosaurus and Diplodocus. It would thus be a member of the Diplodocinae. The following cladogram is based on the phylogenetic analysis conducted by Whitlock in 2011, showing the relationships of Tornieria among the other genera assigned to the taxon Diplodocidae:

- Diplodocidae
  - Apatosaurus
  - - Supersaurus
    - - Dinheirosaurus
      - Tornieria
      - - Barosaurus
        - Diplodocus
