= Principle of homonymy =

Principle of the zoological nomenclature

Principle of Homonymy
- Field: Zoological nomenclature
- Governing code: International Code of Zoological Nomenclature
- Purpose: Ensures that each taxon has a unique scientific name
- Defined in: Article 52, ICZN
- Related principles: Principle of Priority, Principle of Coordination, Principle of Typification
- Applies to: Animal taxa

In zoology, the principle of homonymy is one of the guiding principles of the International Code of Zoological Nomenclature. It states that any one name, in one particular spelling, may be used only once (within its group).

Typically, once a name is made available, any later name with the same spelling (a homonym) is prohibited and must be replaced. The principles of priority and the first reviser apply here. For family-group names the termination (which is rank-bound) is not taken into account, nor are grammatically acceptable alternative spellings or terminations of species-group names (e.g., caeruleus and coeruleus are homonyms, as are smithi and smithii).

In 1777 Johann Reinhold Forster published the name Echidna for a genus of moray eels. This meant that when Georges Cuvier proposed to use this name Echidna in 1797 for the spiny anteater he created a junior homonym. Later, in 1811, Johann Karl Wilhelm Illiger published the name Tachyglossus, as a replacement name, or nomen novum, and this is considered to be the valid name for the spiny anteater.
