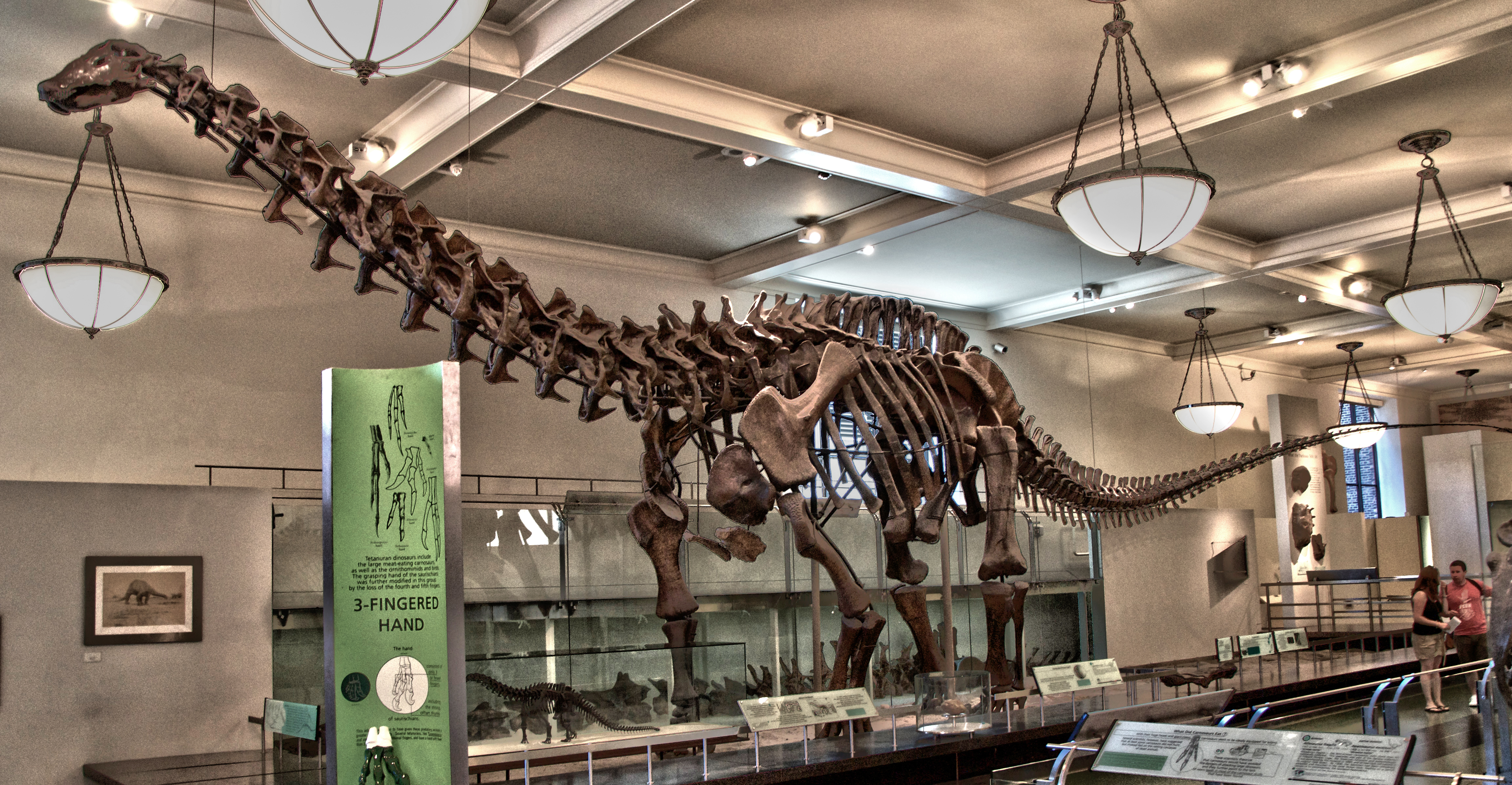
- Skeleton of an apatosaurine (either Apatosaurus or Brontosaurus), American Museum of Natural History 460
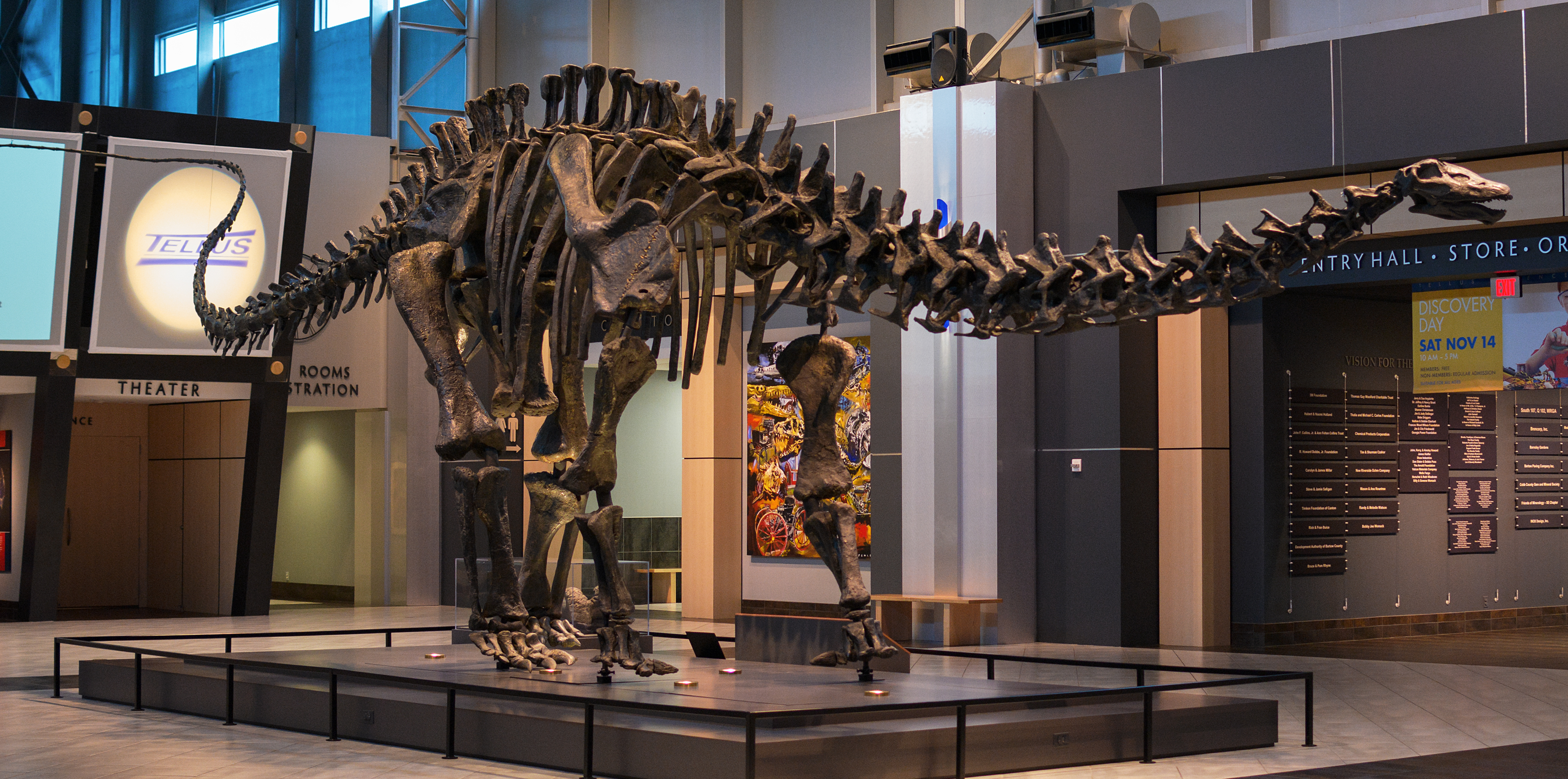
- Skeleton of Brontosaurus

Scientific classification
- Kingdom: Animalia
- Phylum: Chordata
- Class: Reptilia
- Clade: Dinosauria
- Clade: Saurischia
- Clade: †Sauropodomorpha
- Clade: †Sauropoda
- Superfamily: †Diplodocoidea
- Family: †Diplodocidae
- Subfamily: †Apatosaurinae; Janensch, 1927

Genera
- †Amphicoelias?; †Apatosaurus; †Brontosaurus

= Apatosaurinae =

Apatosaurines Temporal range: Late Jurassic, 157–146.8 Ma

Extinct subfamily of dinosaurs

Apatosaurinae (from Ancient Greek words ἀπάτη (apátē), meaning "deception", and σαῦρος (saûros), meaning "lizard") is a subfamily of diplodocid sauropods, an extinct group of large, quadrupedal dinosaurs, the other subfamily in Diplodocidae being Diplodocinae. Apatosaurines are distinguished by their more robust, stocky builds and shorter necks proportionally to the rest of their bodies. Several fairly complete specimens are known, giving a comprehensive view of apatosaurine anatomy.

The subfamily includes only two genera for certain, Apatosaurus and Brontosaurus, according to a 2015 study, though Amphicoelias and a species of Atlantosaurus may also belong to this group. All members are known from the Late Jurassic-aged Morrison Formation of the American West, dating to between 157 and 146.8 million years ago. Fossils were first unearthed in 1877 by crews working for American paleontologist Othniel Charles Marsh in the midst of the Bone Wars, a fossil-hunting rivalry with naturalist Edward Drinker Cope. Marsh went on to name both genera of apatosaurine; Apatosaurus in 1877 and Brontosaurus in 1879. For many years, Brontosaurus was considered a taxonomic synonym of Apatosaurus after a 1903 study by paleontologist Elmer Riggs considered them synonyms. This was the prevalent notion until a 2015 paper led by Emmanuel Tschopp argued that the two were separate genera, however some authors still consider the two synonyms. According to Tschopp and colleagues, there are six valid species of apatosaurine; three in Brontosaurus and two in Apatosaurus.

Apatosaurines were nonselective low-browsers, utilizing their peg-like teeth to feed on plants like ferns, cycadoids, and horsetails. They also had rapid growth rates, with studies finding that apatosaurines reached adult sizes in just ten years, possibly peaking in 5,000 kg (11,000 lb) gained in a single year. As in their relatives the diplodocines, both Apatosaurus and Brontosaurus bore long, whip-like tails which potentially were used for defense or as a tactile organ, for touch. Of note is the robustly built and boxy cervical (neck) vertebrae of apatosaurines, with a study hypothesizing that their necks were used for intraspecific fighting between individuals. Being from the Morrison Formation, apatosaurines coexisted with a menagerie of other taxa such as the sauropods Diplodocus, Barosaurus, and Brachiosaurus; herbivorous ornithischians Stegosaurus, Dryosaurus, and Nanosaurus; as well as the carnivorous theropods Allosaurus, Marshosaurus and Ceratosaurus. This formation was a hotspot of sauropod biodiversity, with over 16 recognized genera, which resulted in niche partitioning between different sauropods.

== Discovery and history ==
=== Initial discoveries and naming ===
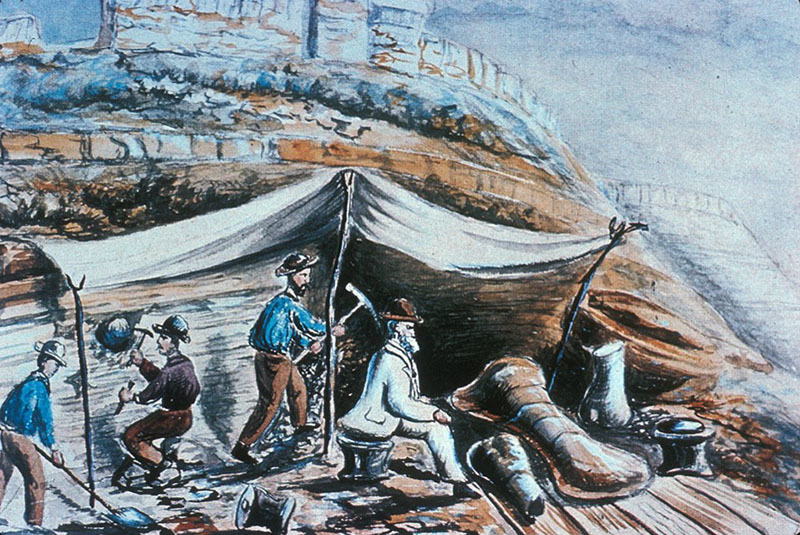
Arthur Lakes' painting of YPM crews excavating fossils of Apatosaurus ajax at Quarry 10 in Morrison.

The first apatosaurine fossils were discovered by Arthur Lakes, a local miner, and his friend Henry C. Beckwith in the spring of 1877 in Morrison, a town in the eastern foothills of the Rocky Mountains in Jefferson County, Colorado. Lakes wrote to Othniel Charles Marsh, Professor of Paleontology at Yale University, and Edward Drinker Cope, a paleontologist based in Philadelphia, about the discovery until eventually collecting several fossils and sending them to both paleontologists. By this time, the Morrison Formation had become the center of the Bone Wars, a fossil-collecting rivalry between Marsh and Cope. Because of this, the publications and descriptions of taxa by the two were rushed at the time. Marsh named Atlantosaurus montanus based on some of the fossils sent and hired Lakes, while Cope attempted to hire Lakes as well but was rejected. One of the best specimens collected by Lakes in 1877 was a well preserved partial postcranial skeleton and a partial braincase (YPM VP 1860), which was sent to Marsh and named Apatosaurus ajax in November 1877. The composite term Apatosaurus comes from the Greek words apatē (ἀπάτη)/apatēlos (ἀπατηλός) meaning "deception"/"deceptive", and sauros (σαῦρος) meaning "lizard"; thus, "deceptive lizard", the same meaning as Apatosaurinae's name. Marsh gave it this name based on the chevron bones, which are dissimilar to those of other dinosaurs; instead, the chevron bones of Apatosaurus showed similarities with those of mosasaurs, most likely that of the representative species Mosasaurus. Marsh believed that both genera were part of a clade he named Atlantosauridae in 1877. Based on remains from the same quarry, Atlantosaurus immanis was described by Marsh in an 1878 article based on an incomplete postcranial skeleton, though it became mixed with the holotype of A. ajax. A 1906 paper described gastroliths from the A. immanis holotype, but gastrolith use in sauropods has since been disproven. Later studies of the A. immanis holotype have determined that they are from an apatosaurine, potentially Apatosaurus itself according several studies, though Tschopp and colleagues stated it was a dubious apatosaurine.

A possible genus of apatosaurine, Amphicoelias, was discovered in 1877 in Morrison Formation outcrops near Cañon City, Colorado by Aaron Ripley who was working for Cope. Ripley sent the remains, consisting of dorsal vertebrae, a femur, and a pubis, to Cope's home Philadelphia on October 21, 1877. In December 1877, Cope named Amphicoelias, the genus name from the Greek terms amphi meaning "both" and kolios "concave" in reference to the anatomy of the dorsal vertebrae. Three species were referred: A. altus, A. fragillimus, and A. latus. Of these, only A. altus is still considered part of the genus whereas A. fragillimus is now Maraapunisaurus and A. latus is a synonym of Camarasaurus supremus or C. grandis.

The discovery of another large and fairly complete sauropod skeleton was announced in 1879 by Marsh. The specimen was collected from Morrison Formation rocks at Como Bluff, Wyoming by William Harlow Reed. Marsh identified it as belonging to an entirely new genus and species, which he named Brontosaurus excelsus, meaning "thunder lizard", from the Greek brontē/βροντη meaning "thunder" and sauros/σαυρος meaning "lizard", and from the Latin excelsus, "noble" or "high". Brontosaurus excelsus' type specimen (YPM 1980) was one of the most complete sauropod skeletons known at the time, preserving many of the characteristic but fragile cervical vertebrae. A year later in 1880, another partial postcranial Brontosaurus skeleton was collected near Como Bluff by Reed, including well-preserved limb elements. Marsh named this second skeleton Brontosaurus amplus in 1881, but it was considered a synonym of B. excelsus in 2015.

=== Second Dinosaur Rush and skull issue ===
After the end of the Bone Wars, many major institutions in the eastern United States were inspired by the depictions and finds by Marsh and Cope to assemble their own dinosaur fossil collections. The competition to mount the first sauropod skeleton specifically was the most intense, with the American Museum of Natural History, Carnegie Museum of Natural History, and Field Museum of Natural History all sending expeditions to the west to find the most complete sauropod specimen, bring it back to the home institution, and mount it in their fossil halls. The American Museum of Natural History was the first to launch an expedition, finding a well preserved skeleton (AMNH 460), which is occasionally assigned to Apatosaurus, is considered nearly complete; only the head, feet, and sections of the tail are missing, and it was the first sauropod skeleton mounted. The specimen was found north of Medicine Bow, Wyoming, in 1898 by Walter Granger, and took the entire summer to extract. To complete the mount, sauropod feet that were discovered at the same quarry and a tail fashioned to appear as Marsh believed it should – but which had too few vertebrae – were added. In addition, a sculpted model of what the museum thought the skull of this massive creature might look like was made. These skulls were likely those of Camarasaurus, the only other sauropod for which good skull material was known at the time, causing workers to sculpt a stand-in skull by hand. Osborn said in a publication that the skull was "largely conjectural and based on that of Morosaurus" (now Camarasaurus).

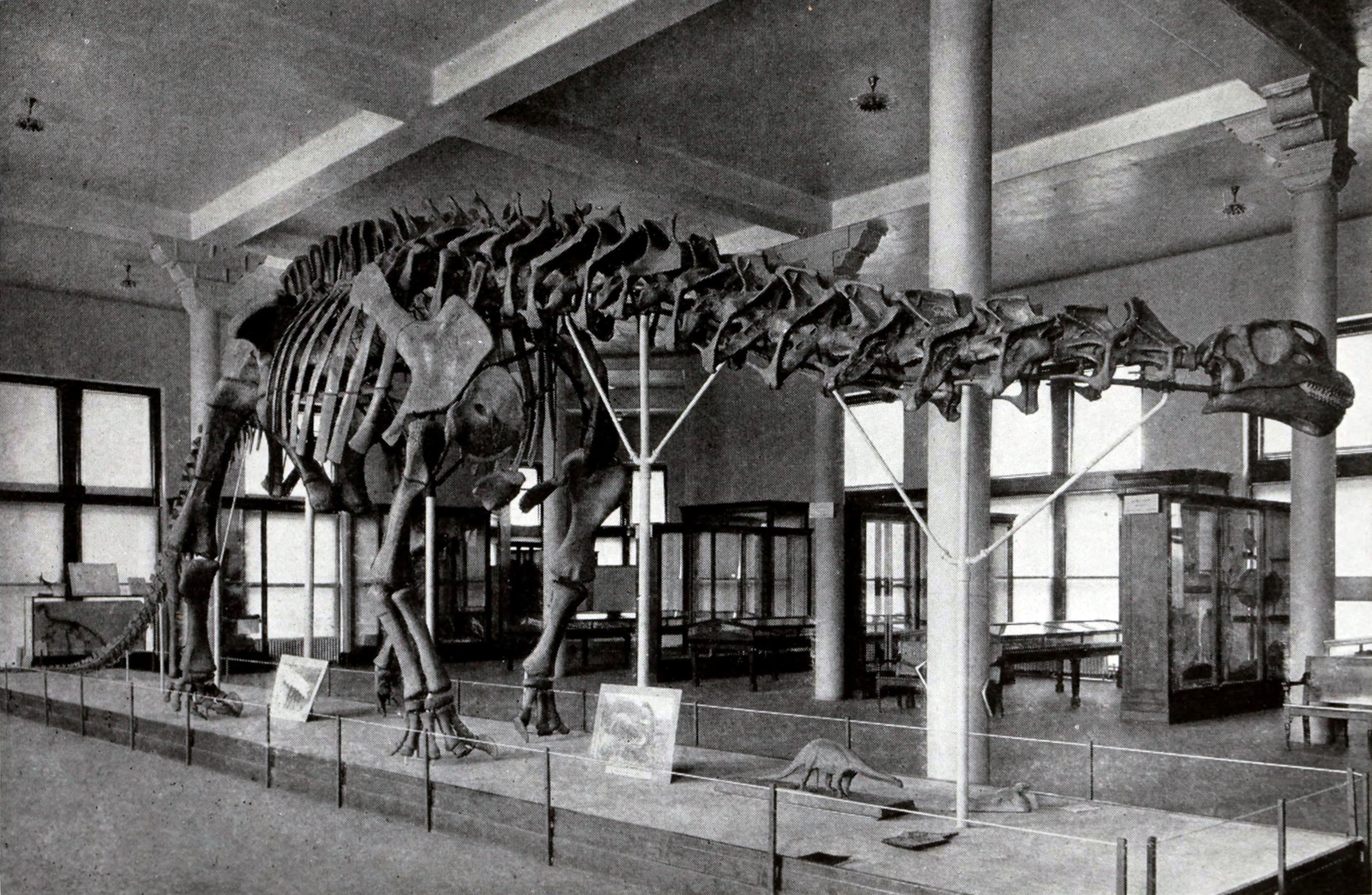
Obsolete mount of an apatosaurine (possibly Apatosaurus or Brontosaurus) specimen AMNH 460 with sculpted skull, American Museum of Natural History

In 1903, Elmer Riggs published a study that described a well-preserved skeleton of a diplodocid from the Grand River Valley near Fruita, Colorado, Field Museum of Natural History specimen P25112. Most of the skeleton was found, and after comparison with both Brontosaurus and Apatosaurus ajax, Riggs realized that the holotype of A. ajax was immature, and thus the features distinguishing the genera were not valid. Since Apatosaurus was the earlier name, Brontosaurus should be considered a junior synonym of Apatosaurus. Because of this, Riggs recombined Brontosaurus excelsus as Apatosaurus excelsus. Despite Riggs' publication, Henry Fairfield Osborn, who was a strong opponent of Marsh and his taxa, labeled the Apatosaurus mount of the American Museum of Natural History Brontosaurus. Because of this decision the name Brontosaurus was commonly used outside of scientific literature for what Riggs considered Apatosaurus, and the museum's popularity meant that Brontosaurus became one of the best known dinosaurs, even though it was invalid throughout nearly all of the 20th and early 21st centuries.

In August 1883, Marshall P. Felch collected a disarticulated partial skull (USNM V 5730) of a sauropod further south in the Felch Quarry at Garden Park, Colorado and sent the specimen to Yale. Marsh referred the skull to B. excelsus, later featuring it in a skeletal reconstruction of the B. excelsus type specimen in 1891 and the illustration was featured again in Marsh's landmark publication, The Dinosaurs of North America, in 1896. At the Yale Peabody Museum, the skeleton of Brontosaurus excelsus was mounted in 1931 with a skull based on the Marsh reconstruction of the Felch Quarry skull. While at the time most museums were using Camarasaurus casts for skulls, the Peabody Museum sculpted a completely different skull based on Marsh's recon. The mandible was based on that of a Camarasaurus. In 1998, the Felch Quarry skull that Marsh included in his 1896 skeletal restoration was suggested to belong to Brachiosaurus instead and this was supported in 2020 with a redescription of the brachiosaurid material found at the Felch Quarry.

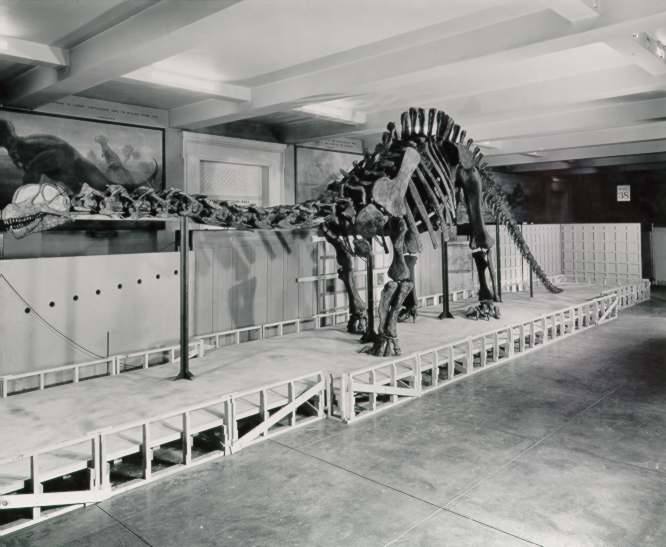
Composite apatosaurine mount (P25112 and P27021) with skull of Camarasaurus (Cast of CM12020) at the Field Museum of Natural History in the 1950s

It was not until 1909 that an Apatosaurus skull was found during the first expedition, led by Earl Douglass, to what would become known as the Carnegie Quarry at Dinosaur National Monument. The skull was found a short distance from a skeleton (specimen CM 3018) identified as the new species Apatosaurus louisae. The skull was designated CM 11162; it was very similar to the skull of Diplodocus. The skull was accepted as belonging to the Apatosaurus specimen by Douglass and Carnegie Museum director William J. Holland, although other scientists – most notably Osborn – rejected this identification. Holland defended his view in 1914 in an address, yet he left the Carnegie Museum mount headless. While some thought Holland was attempting to avoid conflict with Osborn, others suspected Holland was waiting until an articulated skull and neck were found to confirm the association of the skull and skeleton. After Holland's death in 1934, museum staff placed a cast of a Camarasaurus skull on the mount.

No Apatosaurus skull was mentioned in literature until the 1970s when John Stanton McIntosh and David Berman redescribed the skulls of Diplodocus and Apatosaurus. They found that though he never published his opinion, Holland was almost certainly correct, that Apatosaurus had a Diplodocus-like skull. According to them, many skulls long thought to pertain to Diplodocus might instead be those of Apatosaurus. They reassigned multiple skulls to Apatosaurus based on associated and closely associated vertebrae. In 1979, after the publications by McIntosh and Berman, the first true skull of Apatosaurus was mounted on a skeleton in a museum, that of the Carnegie.

=== Recent finds and reassessment ===
Another specimen of an apatosaurine was discovered in 1993 by the Tate Geological Museum, also from the Morrison Formation of central Wyoming. The specimen consisted of a partial postcranial skeleton, including a complete manus and multiple vertebrae, and was described by James Filla and Pat Redman a year later. Filla and Redman named the specimen Apatosaurus yahnahpin, but Robert T. Bakker gave it the genus name Eobrontosaurus in 1998. Bakker believed that Eobrontosaurus was the direct predecessor to Brontosaurus, although Tschopp and colleague's phylogenetic analysis placed B. yahnahpin as the basalmost species of Brontosaurus.

Infographic explaining the history of Brontosaurus and Apatosaurus according to Tschopp et al. 2015

In 2011, the first specimen of Apatosaurus where a skull was found articulated with its cervical vertebrae was described. This specimen, CMC VP 7180, was found to differ in both skull and neck features from A. louisae, but shared many features of the cervical vertebrae with A. ajax. Another well-preserved skull is Brigham Young University specimen 17096, a well-preserved skull and skeleton, with a preserved braincase. The specimen was found in Cactus Park Quarry in western Colorado. In 2013, Matthew Mossbrucker and several other authors published an abstract that described a premaxilla and maxilla from Lakes' original quarry in Morrison and referred the material to Apatosaurus ajax. A skull from Como Bluff, this specimen associated with several cervical vertebrae, was described in 2022.

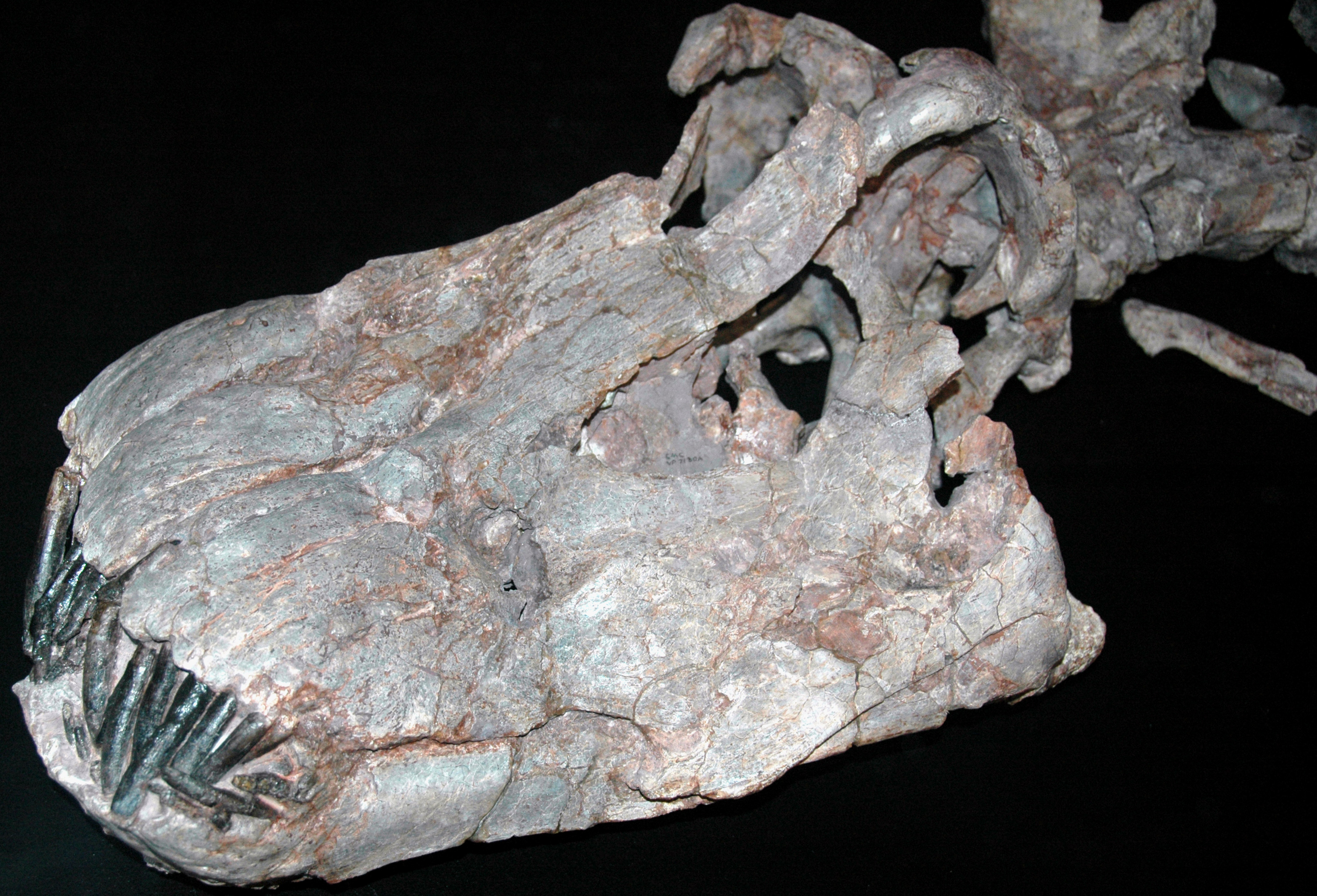
Apatosaurus ajax skull, specimen CMC VP 7180

Almost all 20th-century paleontologists agreed with Riggs that all Apatosaurus and Brontosaurus species should be classified in a single genus. According to the rules of the ICZN, which governs the scientific names of animals, the name Apatosaurus, having been published first, had priority; Brontosaurus was considered a junior synonym and was therefore discarded from formal use. Despite this, at least one paleontologist—Robert T. Bakker—argued in the 1990s that A. ajax and A. excelsus are sufficiently distinct that the latter continues to merit a separate genus.

In 2015, an extensive study of diplodocid relationships by Emanuel Tschopp and colleagues concluded that Brontosaurus was indeed a valid genus of sauropod distinct from Apatosaurus. The scientists developed a statistical method to more objectively assess differences between fossil genera and species and concluded that Brontosaurus could be "resurrected" as a valid name. They assigned two former Apatosaurus species, A. parvus, and A. yahnahpin, to Brontosaurus, as well as the type species B. excelsus. The publication was met with some criticism from other paleontologists, including Michael D'Emic, Donald Prothero, who criticized the mass media reaction to this study as superficial and premature, and paleontologists like John and Rebecca Hunt-Foster continue to consider Brontosaurus as a synonym of Apatosaurus.

== Description ==
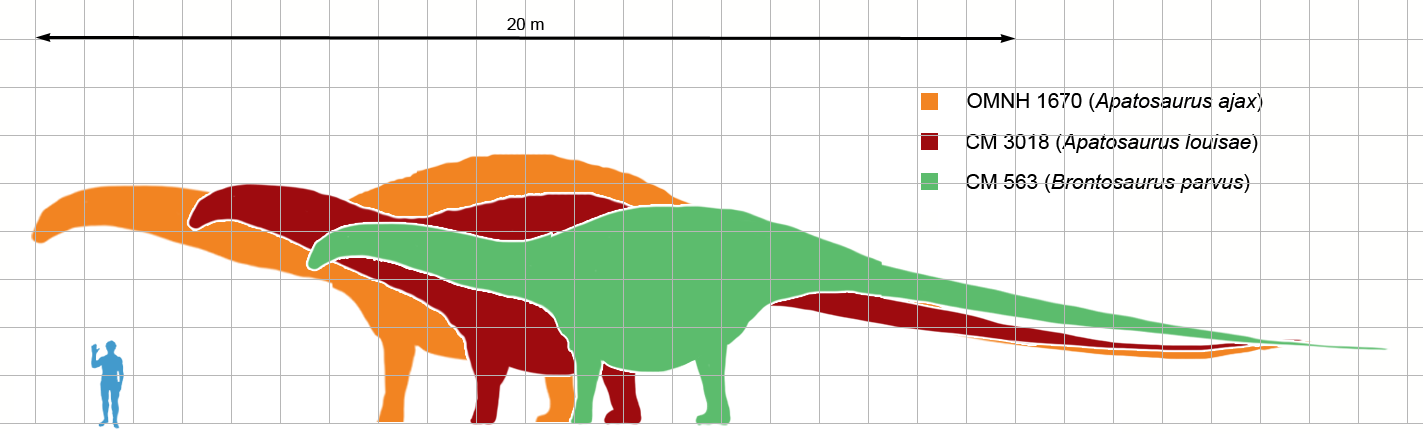
Comparison of three specimens and a human: Oklahoma specimen of Apatosaurus ajax (orange), A. louisae (red), and Brontosaurus parvus (green)

Apatosaurines are large, long-necked, quadrupedal animals with long, whip-like tails, and forelimbs that were slightly shorter than its hindlimbs. The size of apatosaurines varies, like A. louisae which measures 21–23 m (69–75 ft) in length and 16.4–22.4 t (16.1–22.0 long tons; 18.1–24.7 short tons) in mass and B. excelsus which is 21–22 m (69–72 ft) long and 15–17 t (17–19 short tons). Some specimens of A. ajax (such as OMNH 1670) represent individuals 11–30% longer, suggesting masses twice that of CM 3018 or 32.7–72.6 t (32.2–71.5 long tons; 36.0–80.0 short tons), potentially rivaling the largest titanosaurs. However, the upper size estimate of OMNH 1670 is likely an exaggeration, with the size estimates revised in 2020 at 30 m (98 ft) in length and 33 t (36 short tons) in body mass based on volumetric analysis. Some studies have suggested a general increase in the size of sauropods such as apatosaurs within the upper layers of the Morrison Formation compared to earlier units. However, a 2026 study described apatosaur remains from a site in Arches National Park, one of the highest places in the formation, consistent with a modestly sized animal. These remains constitute some of the geologically youngest apatosaur remains in the fossil record.

=== Skull ===
The skull is small in relation to the size of the animal. The jaws are lined with spatulate (chisel-like) teeth suited to an herbivorous diet. The snout of Apatosaurus and similar diplodocoids is squared, with only Nigersaurus having a squarer skull. The braincase of Apatosaurus is well preserved in specimen BYU 17096, which also preserved much of the skeleton. A phylogenetic analysis found that the braincase had a morphology similar to those of other diplodocoids. Some skulls of Apatosaurus have been found still in articulation with their teeth. Those teeth that have the dentine surface exposed bear many small, subcircular features, but no scratches or features on the enamel.

=== Vertebrae ===
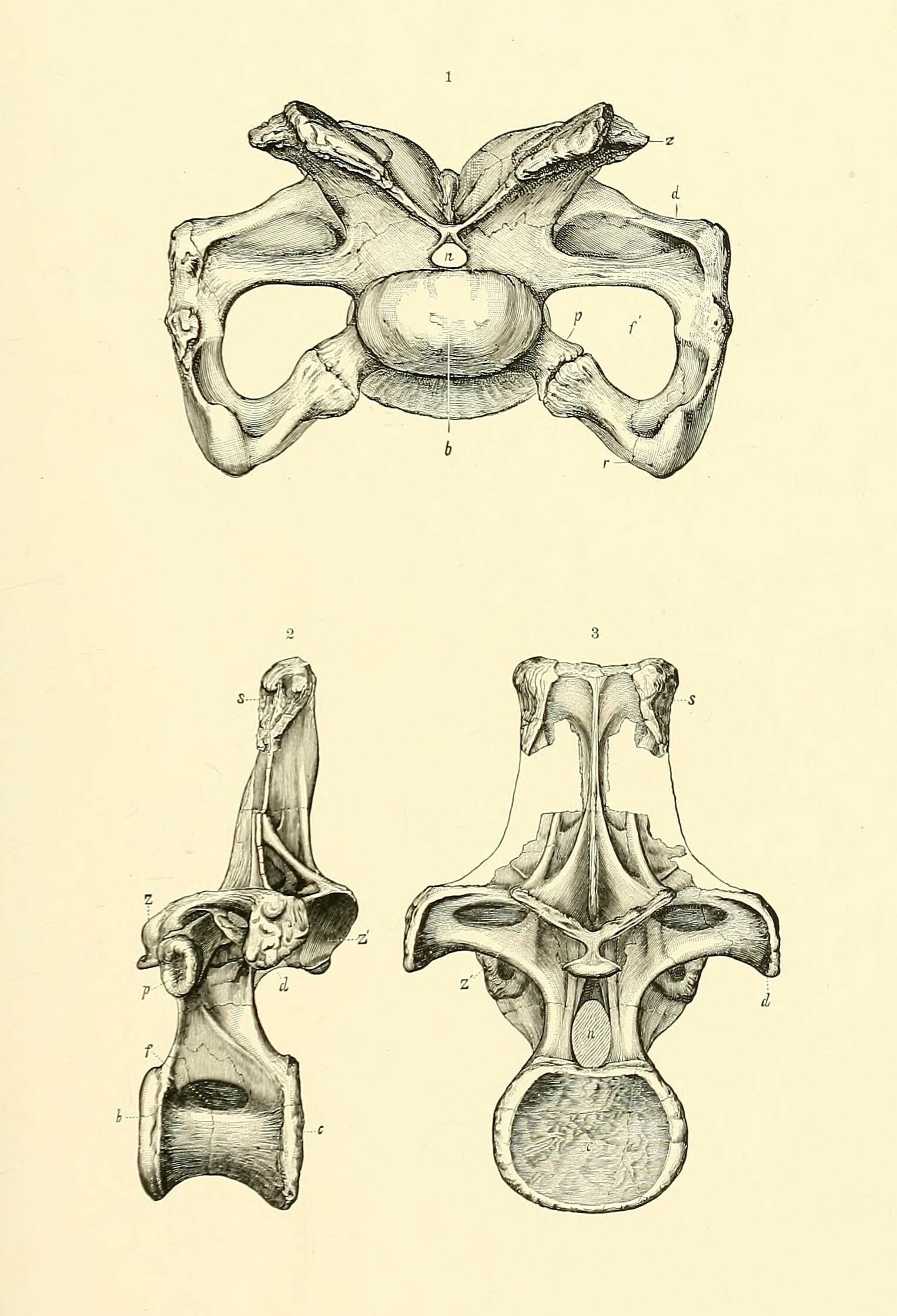
A cervical (top) and dorsal vertebra (bottom) of B. excelsus.

Like those of other diplodocids, the vertebrae of the neck were deeply bifurcated on the dorsal side; that is, they carried paired spines, resulting in a wide and deep neck. Their spines and tails consists of 15 cervicals, ten dorsals, five sacrals, and about 82 caudals in Apatosaurus and likely Brontosaurus. However, the number of caudal vertebrae has been noted to vary, even within a species. Vertebrae in the neck, torso, and sacrum of sauropods bore large pneumatic foramen on their lateral sides. These are used to lighten the bones which aided in keeping the animal lighter. Within the vertebrae as well, smooth bone walls in addition to diverticula would make pockets of air to keep the bones light. Similar structures are observable in birds and large mammals. The cervical vertebrae were stouter than those of other diplodocids, being wide and rectangular in anterior view. On the lateral sides of the cervicals, apatosaurines had well-developed and thick parapophyses (extensions on the lateral sides of the vertebrae that attached to cervical ribs) which would point ventrally under the centrum. These parapophyses in conjunction with dense diapophyses and cervical ribs were strong anchors for neck muscles, which could sustain extreme force. The cervicals were also more boxy than in other sauropods due to their truncated zygapophyses and tall build. These vertebrae are triangular in anterior view, whereas they most often are rounded or square in genera like Camarasaurus. Despite its pneumaticy, the necks of Brontosaurus and Apatosaurus are thought to have been double the mass of that of other diplodocids due to the former's sturdiness. Brontosaurus differs from Apatosaurus in several regards, such as their posterior dorsal vertebrae's neural spines are longer than they are wide and Apatosaurus' posterior cervicals bear a detached horizontal lamina in the fossae of their diapophyseal laminae in the mid-posterior cervicals.

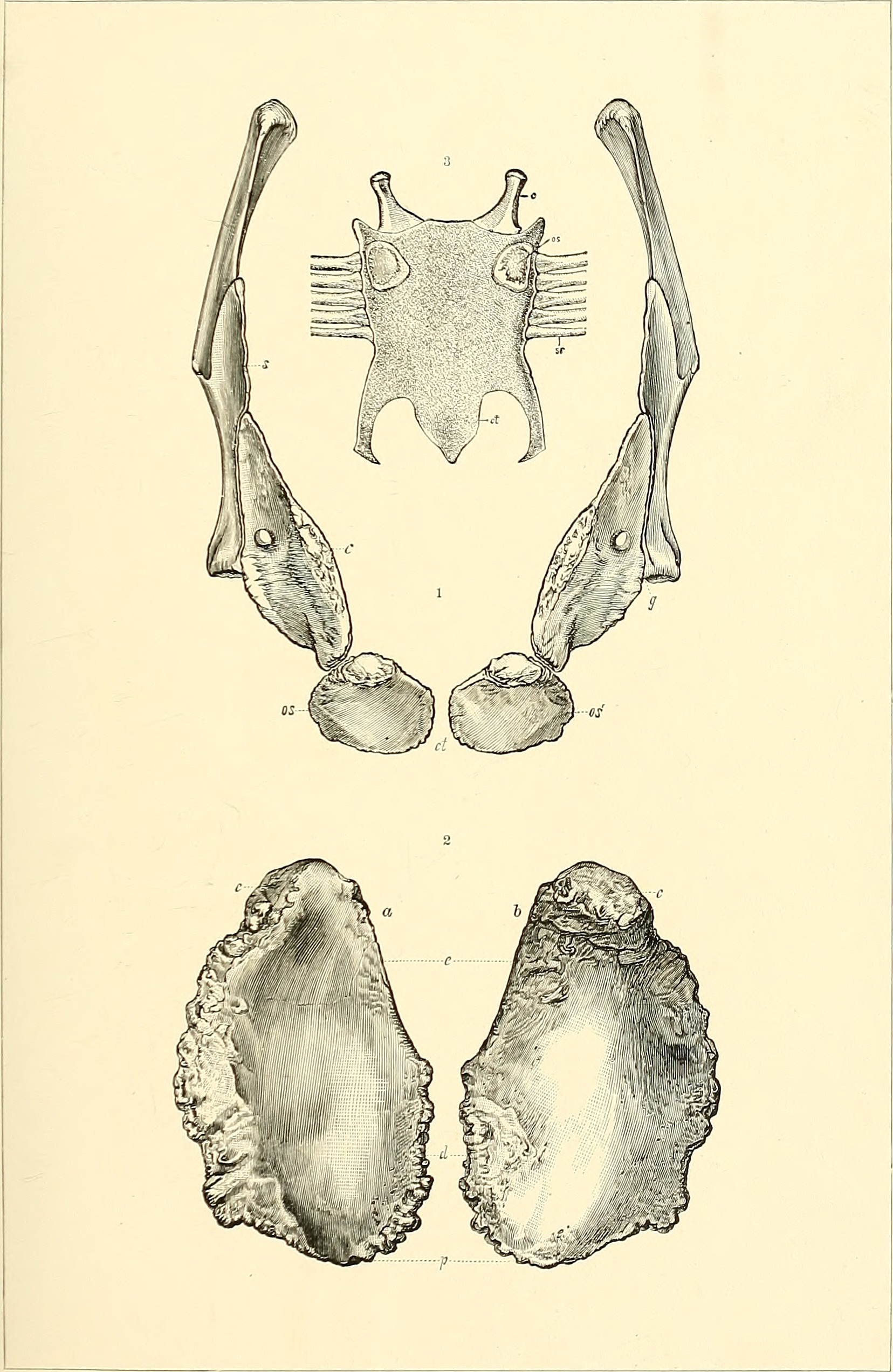
Pectoral girdle of Brontosaurus excelsus

Their dorsal vertebrae have short centra with large fossae (shallow excavations) on their lateral sides, though not as extensively as the cervicals'. Neural canals, which contain the spinal cord of the vertebral column, are ovate and large in the dorsals. The diapophyses protrude outward and curve downward in a hook-shape. Neural spines are thick in anterior-posterior view with a bifurcate top. The neural spines of the dorsals would increase in height further towards the tail, creating an arched back. Apatosaurine neural spines compose more than half the height of the vertebrae. The dorsal ribs are not fused or tightly attached to their vertebrae, instead being loosely articulated. Ten dorsal ribs are on either side of the body of apatosaurines. There are widened excavations within the sacrum, giving it a hollow cylindrical shape. The posteriormost caudal vertebra was lightly fused to the sacral vertebrae, becoming part of the plate. Internally, the neural canal was enlarged. The shape of the tail was typical for diplodocids, being comparatively slender due to the vertebral spines rapidly decreasing in height the farther they are from the hips. As in other diplodocids, the tail ended in a strongly elongated, whip-like structure. The tail also had an extensive air-sac system as observed in specimens of B. parvus.

=== Limbs ===
Several scapulae are known from apatosaurines, all of which are long and thin with relatively elongated shafts. One of traits that distinguishes Brontosaurus and Apatosaurus is the presence of a depression on the posterior face of the scapula, which the latter lacks. The scapula of Brontosaurus also has a rounded extension off of its edge, a characteristic unique to Brontosaurus among Apatosaurinae. The coracoids of apatosaurines have a quadratic outline in dorsal view. Sterna have been preserved in some specimens of Apatosaurus and Brontosaurus, which display an oval outline. The hip bones include robust ilia and the fused pubes and ischia. The limb bones are also very robust, with the humerus resembling that of Camarasaurus. The humerus had a thin bone shaft and larger transverse ends. Its anterior end bears a large deltopectoral crest, which was on the extremities of the bone. Charles Gilmore in 1936 noted that previous reconstructions erroneously proposed that the radius and ulna could cross, when in life they would have remained parallel. Apatosaurines have a single large claw on each forelimb which faces towards the body, whereas the rest of the phalanges lacked unguals. Even by 1936, it was recognized that no sauropod had more than one hand claw preserved, and this one claw is now accepted as the maximum number throughout the entire group. The metacarpals are elongated and thinner than the phalanges, bearing boxy articular ends on its proximal and distal faces. The single front claw bone is slightly curved and squarely shortened on the front end. The phalangeal formula is 2-1-1-1-1, meaning the innermost finger (phalanx) on the forelimb has two bones and the next has one. The single manual claw bone (ungual) is slightly curved and squarely truncated on the anterior end. Proportions of the manus bones vary within Apatosaurinae as well, with B. yahnahpin's ratio of longest metacarpal to radius length around 0.40 or greater compared to a lower value in Apatosaurus louisae. The femora of apatosaurines are very stout and represent some of the most robust femora of any member of Sauropoda. The tibia and fibula bones are different from the slender bones of Diplodocus but are nearly indistinguishable from those of Camarasaurus. The fibula is longer and slenderer than the tibia. Apatosaurine feet have three claws on the innermost digits; the digit formula is 3-4-5-3-2. The first metatarsal is the stoutest, a feature shared among all diplodocids.

== Classification ==
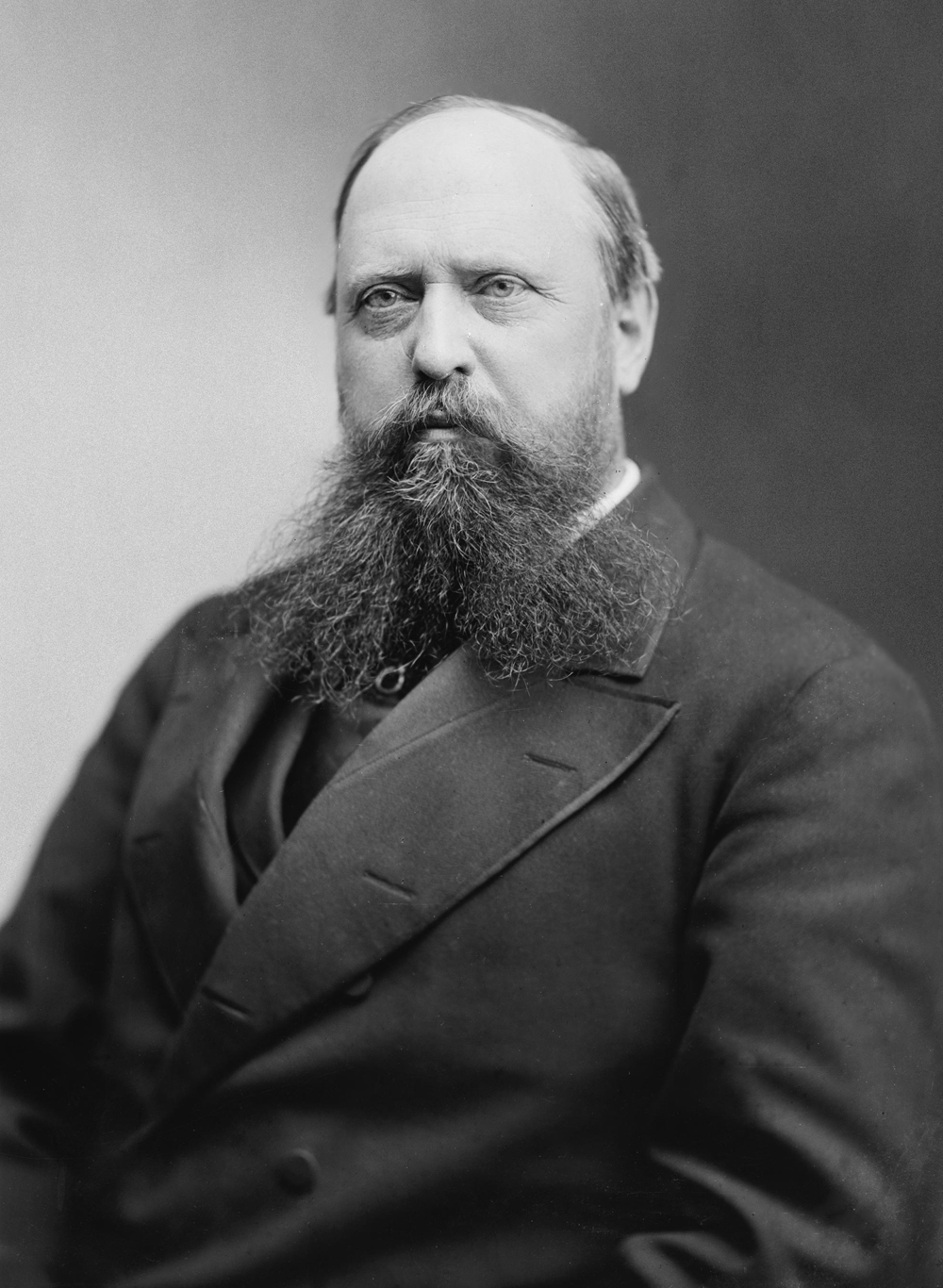
Portrait of Othniel Charles Marsh, describer of Apatosaurus and Brontosaurus

Apatosaurinae forms, together with Diplodocinae, the clade Diplodocidae. Diplodocids have been found in Africa, Europe, and North America, the group originating in the Middle Jurassic and going extinct in the Early Cretaceous. Apatosaurinae is definitively represented by only two genera; Apatosaurus and Brontosaurus, according to a comprehensive 2015 study by researcher Emmanuel Tschopp and colleagues which found the two to be separate genera. It is stem-based, being defined as all taxa more closely related to Apatosaurus than Diplodocus by paleontologists Mike Taylor and Darren Naish in 2005. Two other sauropods, Amphicoelias and a species of the dubious genus Atlantosaurus, A. immanis, have been suggested to be part of the group as well. However, some studies have placed Amphicoelias as a basal member of Diplodocidae or Diplodocoidea, though a 2021 paper found it to be an apatosaurine in three phylogenetic analyses. A 2007 paper found Supersaurus and Suuwassea to be within Apatosaurinae and sister to Apatosaurus, though the reason for perceived similarities between Apatosaurus and Supersaurus may have been due to size-coupled increases in robustness in sauropods. This analysis also found Suuwassea to be the basalmost member of Apatosaurinae, however more detailed descriptions of its remains suggest it was a basal dicraeosaurid. Recent studies have found little support for including Supersaurus or Suuwassea in Apatosaurinae, limiting the group to Apatosaurus, Brontosaurus, and possibly Amphicoelias. Several indeterminate apatosaurine skeletons have also been found and likely belong to either Apatosaurus or Brontosaurus, such as the specimens AMNH 460 and FMNH P25112, though their statuses are inconclusive. Dozens of isolated or fragmentary specimens have also been assigned to the genera, but were not reviewed by Tschopp and colleague's study.

The cladogram below is the result of a 2015 analysis by Tschopp, Mateus, and Benson. The authors analyzed most diplodocid type specimens separately to deduce which specimen belonged to which species and genus.

- Apatosaurinae
  - - YPM 1840 ("Atlantosaurus" immanis type)
    - NSMT-PV 20375
  - - AMNH 460
    - - Apatosaurus
        - Apatosaurus ajax
          YPM 1860 (Apatosaurus ajax type)
        - Apatosaurus louisae
          - CM 3018 (Apatosaurus louisae type)
          - YPM 1861 (Apatosaurus laticollis type)
      - Brontosaurus
        - Brontosaurus excelsus
          - YPM 1980 (Brontosaurus excelsus type)
          - YPM 1981 (Brontosaurus amplus type)
        - - AMNH 5764 (Amphicoelias altus type)
          - - FMNH P25112
            - - Brontosaurus yahnahpin
                Tate-001 (Eobrontosaurus yahnahpin type)
              - Brontosaurus parvus
                - CM 566 (Elosaurus parvus type)
                - - UM 15556
                  - BYU 1252-18531

Marsh was the first to recognize the differences between Apatosaurus and Brontosaurus versus other sauropods and researcher Otto Jaekel erected Brontosauridae in 1911. However, the name Apatosaurinae is attributed to a 1927 paper by Friedrich von Huene, who included only Apatosaurus and the invalid Uintasaurus in the subfamily, according to the ICZN's principle of coordination (publishing a new zoological name simultaneously applies the name to all usable ranks). He considered Apatosauridae, Diplodocidae, Dicraeosauridae, Morosauridae, Cardiodontidae, and Brachiosauridae to be part of Sauropoda. Its first explicit use as a subfamily was in a 1929 paper by Werner Janensch, who classified it, including only Apatosaurus, within the family Homalosauropodidae. Homalosauropodidae was thought to contain the other subfamilies Titanosaurinae, Dicraeosaurinae, and Diplodocinae. Later sauropod specialists considered Apatosaurinae and Diplodocinae to be together in Diplodocidae, which excluded Titanosauria and Dicraeosauridae.

Below is a cladogram of apatosaurinae interrelationships based on Tschopp et al., 2015.

- Diplodocidae
  - Amphicoelias altus
  - - Diplodocinae
    - Apatosaurinae
      - Unnamed species
      - - - Apatosaurus ajax
          - Apatosaurus louisae
        - - Brontosaurus excelsus
          - - Brontosaurus yahnahpin
            - Brontosaurus parvus

== Paleobiology ==
When Brontosaurus and Apatosaurus were described in the late 1870s, the widespread notion in the scientific community was that sauropods were semi-aquatic, lathargic reptiles that were inactive. In Othniel Marsh's publication The Dinosaurs of North America, he described B. excelsus as "more or less amphibious, and its food was probably aquatic plants or other succulent vegetation" (174). This is unsupported by fossil evidence. Instead, sauropods were active and had adaptations for dwelling on land. Marsh also noted the animal's supposed lack of intellect based on the small braincase of the Felch Quarry skull and slender neural cord. A 2009 study has found that the brain of the related sauropod Brachiosaurus was small, even for a reptile, suggesting a low intellect.

Trackways of sauropods show that they could potentially reach a top speed of 12–19 km/h (7.5–11.8 mph). The slow locomotion of sauropods may be due to the minimal muscling or recoil after strides, a predictable quality due to the gigantism and graviportal limb posture of sauropods.

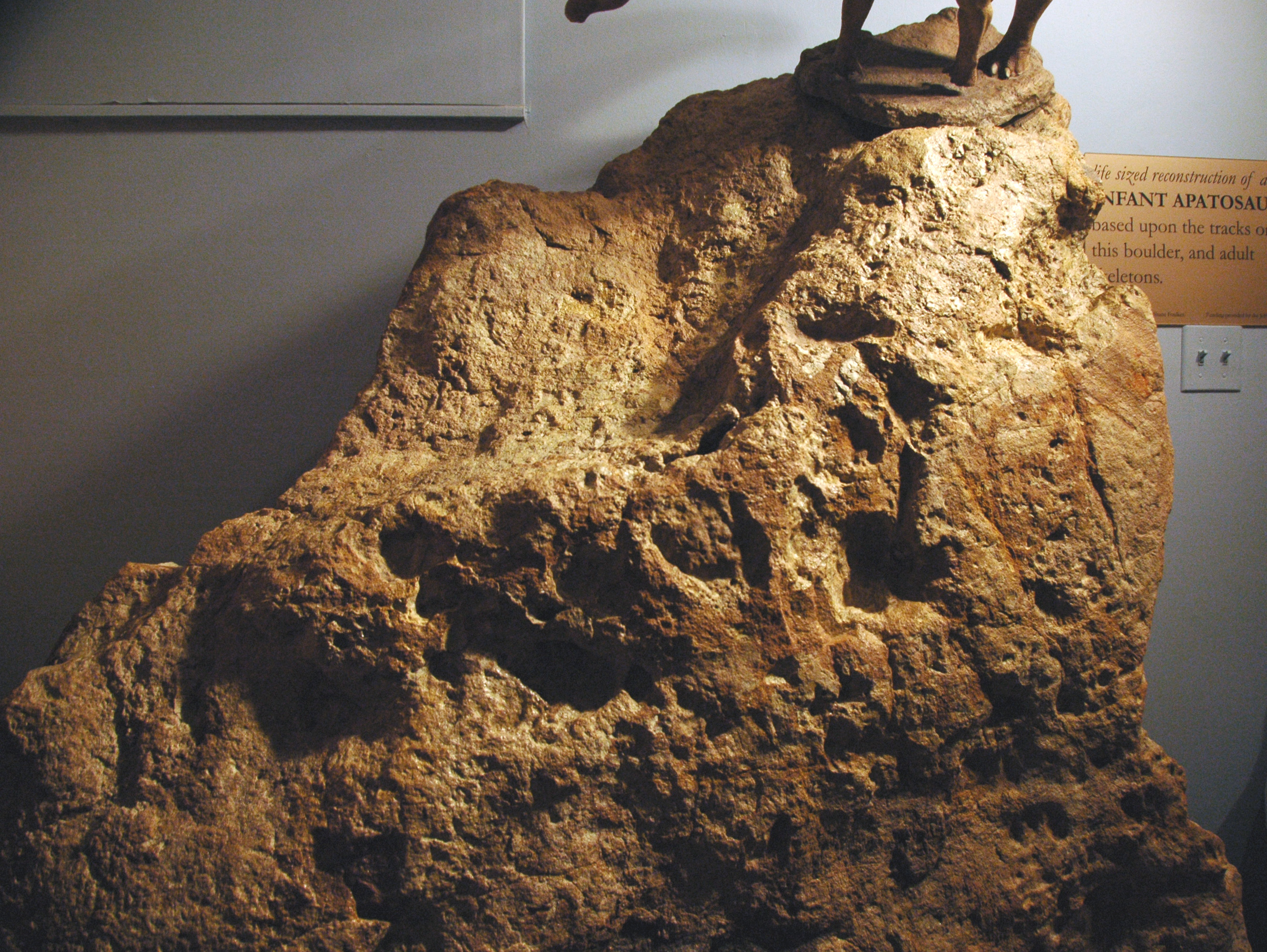
Infant Apatosaurus footprints

=== Diet and energy requirements ===
Being diplodocids, apatosaurines were herbivorous and fed on ferns, cycadeoids, seed ferns, and horsetails. Unlike in diplodocines, the entire tooth row of Apatosaurus was replaced at once. The teeth of Apatosaurus are thick, lack denticles, and are strongly cylindrical in cross-section whereas they are long, slender, and elliptical in cross-section in Diplodocus. These characteristics imply that Apatosaurus consumed tougher vegetation than Diplodocus. Diplodocids in general also have shorter necks than the long-necked, vertically inclined macronarians. This would result in niche partitioning, the various taxa thus avoiding direct competition with each other due to feeding on different plants and at different heights.

Endotherms (mammals) and ectotherms (reptiles) require a specific amount of nutrition to survive which correlates with their metabolism as well as body size. Estimations of the dietary necessities of Brontosaurus were made in 2010, with an estimate of 2•10^4 to 50•10^4 kilojoules needed daily. This led to hypotheses on the distributions of Brontosaurus to meet this requirement, though whether it was an ectotherm or endotherm is debated. If Brontosaurus was an endotherm, fewer adult individuals could be sustained than if it were an ectotherm, which could have tens of animals per square kilometer. Due to this, it has been theorized that sauropods living within the arid environment of the Morrison Formation participated in migrations between feeding sites. James Farlow in a 1987 paper calculated that a Brontosaurus-sized dinosaur about 35 t (34 long tons; 39 short tons) would have possessed 5.7 t (5.6 long tons; 6.3 short tons) of gut contents. Assuming Apatosaurus had an avian respiratory system and a reptilian resting-metabolism, Frank Paladino and colleagues estimated in 1987 that the animal would have needed to consume only about 262 liters (58 imp gal; 69 U.S. gal) of water per day.

=== Posture ===
Historically, apatosaurines and other sauropods were believed to have been too massive to support their weight on land, and were therefore assumed to have lived partly submerged in water, perhaps in swamps. Recent findings do not support this, and sauropods are now thought to have been fully terrestrial. Diplodocids are often portrayed with their necks held high up in the air, allowing them to browse on tall trees. Though some studies have suggested that diplodocid necks were less flexible than previously believed, other studies have found that all tetrapods appear to hold their necks at the maximum possible vertical extension when in a normal, alert posture, and argue that the same would hold true for sauropods barring any unknown, unique characteristics that set the soft tissue anatomy of their necks apart from that of other animals.

=== Physiology ===
James Spotila and colleagues suggested in 1991 that the large body size of sauropods would have made them unable to maintain high metabolic rates, as they would not be able to release enough heat. However, temperatures in the Jurassic were 3 degrees Celsius higher than present. Furthermore, they assumed that the animals had a reptilian respiratory system. Matt Wedel found that an avian system would have allowed them to dump more heat. Some scientists have also argued that the heart would have had trouble sustaining sufficient blood pressure to oxygenate the brain.

Given the large body mass and long neck of sauropods, physiologists have encountered problems determining how these animals breathed. Beginning with the assumption that, like crocodilians, Brontosaurus and Apatosaurus did not have a diaphragm, the dead-space volume (the amount of unused air remaining in the mouth, trachea, and air tubes after each breath) has been estimated at 0.184 m^{3} (184 L) for a 30 t (30 long tons; 33 short tons) specimen. Paladino calculates its tidal volume (the amount of air moved in or out during a single breath) at 0.904 m^{3} (904 L) with an avian respiratory system, 0.225 m^{3} (225 L) if mammalian, and 0.019 m^{3} (19 L) if reptilian.

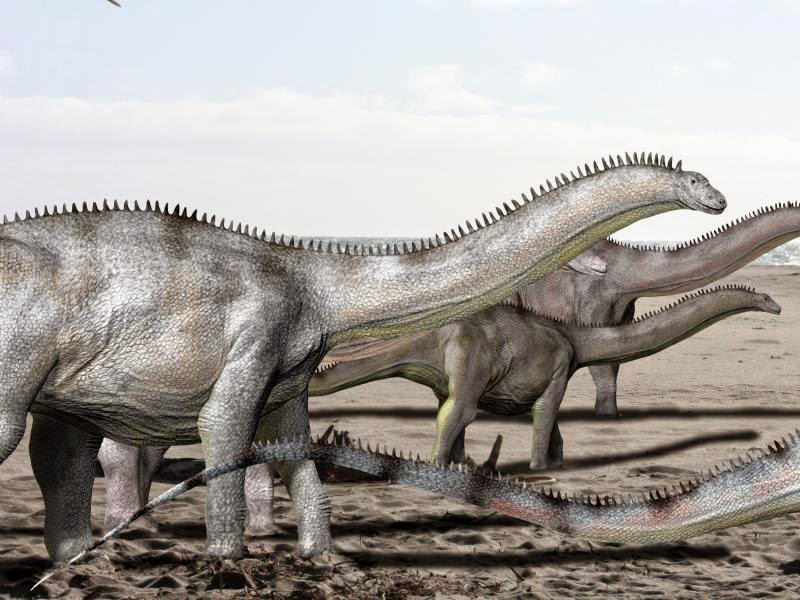
Life restoration of a herd of B. excelsus

Based on this, its respiratory system would likely have consisted of parabronchi, with multiple pulmonary air sacs as in avian lungs, and a flow-through lung. An avian respiratory system would need a lung volume of about 0.60 m^{3} (600 L) compared with a mammalian requirement of 2.95 m^{3} (2,950 L), which would exceed the space available. The overall thoracic volume of the same-sized Apatosaurus has been estimated at 1.7 m^{3} (1,700 L), allowing for a 0.50 m^{3} (500 L), a four-chambered heart and a 0.90 m^{3} (900 L) lung capacity. That would allow about 0.30 m^{3} (300 L) for the necessary tissue. Evidence for the avian system in apatosaurines and other sauropods is also present in the pneumaticity of the vertebrae. Though this plays a role in reducing the weight of the animal, a 2003 publication by Matt Wedel states they are also likely connected to air sacs, as in birds.

=== Juveniles ===
A 1999 microscopic study of Apatosaurus and Brontosaurus bones concluded the animals grew rapidly when young and reached near-adult sizes in about 10 years. In 2008, a study on the growth rates of sauropods was published by biologists Thomas Lehman and Holly Woodward. They said that by using growth lines and length-to-mass ratios, Apatosaurus would have grown to 25 t (25 long tons; 28 short tons) in 15 years, with growth peaking at 5,000 kg (11,000 lb) in a single year. An alternative method, using limb length and body mass, found Brontosaurus and Apatosaurus grew 520 kg (1,150 lb) per year, and reached their full mass before it was about 70 years old. These estimates have been called unreliable because the calculation methods are not sound; old growth lines would have been obliterated by bone remodeling. One of the first identified growth factors of Apatosaurus was the number of sacral vertebrae, which increased to five by the time of the creature's maturity. This was first noted in 1903 and again in 1936. Juvenile Brontosaurus material is known based on the type specimen of B. parvus. The material of this specimen, CM 566, includes vertebrae from various regions, one pelvic bone, and some bones of the hindlimb. When describing B. parvus, Peterson and Gilmore noted that the neural spines were sutured, the sacral vertebrae were unfused, features that are signs of immaturity in other archosaurs, showing that sauropods had these traits too.

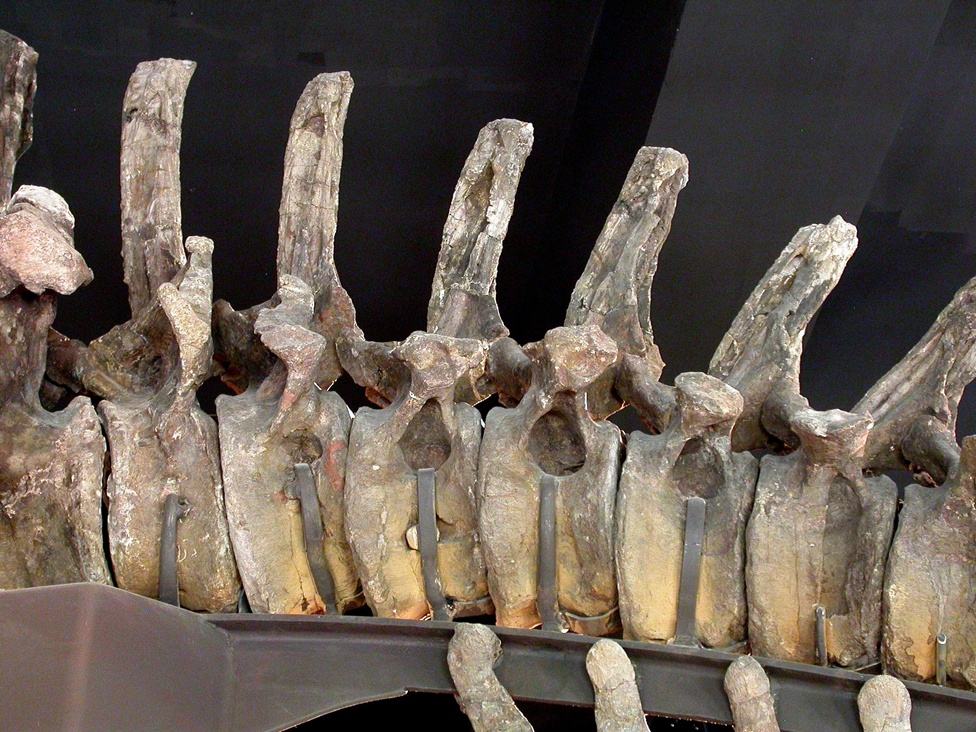
Caudal vertebrae of an indeterminate apatosaurine (FMNH P25112)

=== Tail ===
A 1997 study by Nathan Myhrvold, a computer scientist from Microsoft, carried out a computer simulation of the tail, which in diplodocids, including apatosaurines, was a very long, tapering structure resembling a bullwhip. This computer modeling suggested that sauropods were capable of producing a whip-like cracking sound of over 200 decibels, comparable to the volume of a cannon. There is some circumstantial evidence supporting this as well: a number of diplodocids have been found with fused or damaged tail vertebrae, which may be a symptom of cracking their tails: these are particularly common between the 18th and the 25th caudal vertebra, a region the authors consider a transitional zone between the stiff muscular base and the flexible whiplike section. However, a 2012 article notes that Camarasaurus while lacking a tailwhip, displays a similar level of caudal co-ossification and that Mamenchisaurus while having the same pattern of vertebral metrics, lacks a tailwhip and does not display fusion in any "transitional region". Also, the crush fractures which would be expected if the tail was used as a whip have never been found in diplodocids. More recently in 2021, Matthew Baron has considered the use of the tail as a bullwhip unlikely because of the potentially catastrophic muscle and skeletal damage such speeds could cause on the large and heavy tail. Instead, he proposes that the tails might have been used as a tactile organ to keep in touch with the individuals behind and to the sides of the animal in a group, which could have augmented cohesion and allowed communication among individuals while limiting more energetically demanding activities like stopping to search for dispersed individuals, turning to visually check on others behind, or communicating vocally. A 2022 study by Simone Conti and colleagues proved that the whip-like cracking would not be possible through the use of more accurate 3D models and mathematical data.

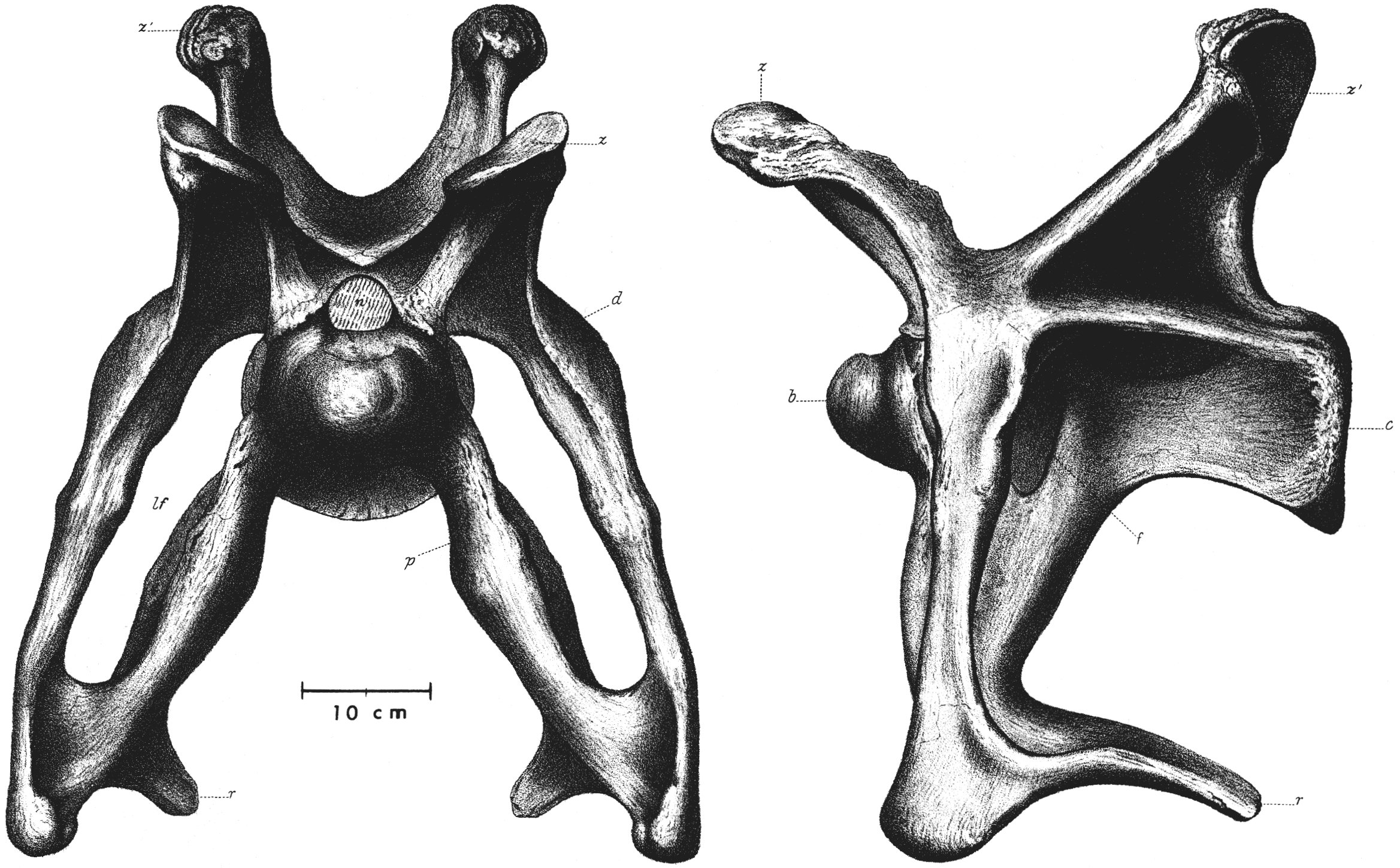
A cervical vertebra of B. excelsus, showing its robusticity.

=== Neck combat ===
The cervical vertebrae of Brontosaurus and Apatosaurus are robust, which has led to speculation on the purpose of the neck's robusticity. The neck had expensive energy requirements, so the reason for their evolution must have been important to the animal. notable features include: dense cervical ribs and diapophyses, ribs that are angled ventrally, and an overall subtriangular cross-section. Cervical ribs acted as anchors for the longus colli ventralis and flexer colli lateralis muscles, which are used in the ventral motion of the neck. Stronger muscles for ventral motions allowed more force to be exerted ventrally. The cervical ribs formed a "V"-shape in anterior view, which could be used to shelter the softer underlying tissues of the neck from damage. The bottoms of these cervical ribs were capped by round, protruding processes (extensions of bone). These have been suggested to have been attachment points for bosses or keratinous spikes. In a 2015 preprint, Taylor and colleagues argued that due to the combination of these traits, apatosaurines would use their necks for combat between individuals by striking each other with their necks, with this hypothesis being nicknamed "Brontosmash". Behavior like this has been observed in other animals like giraffes.

== Evolutionary history and biogeography ==
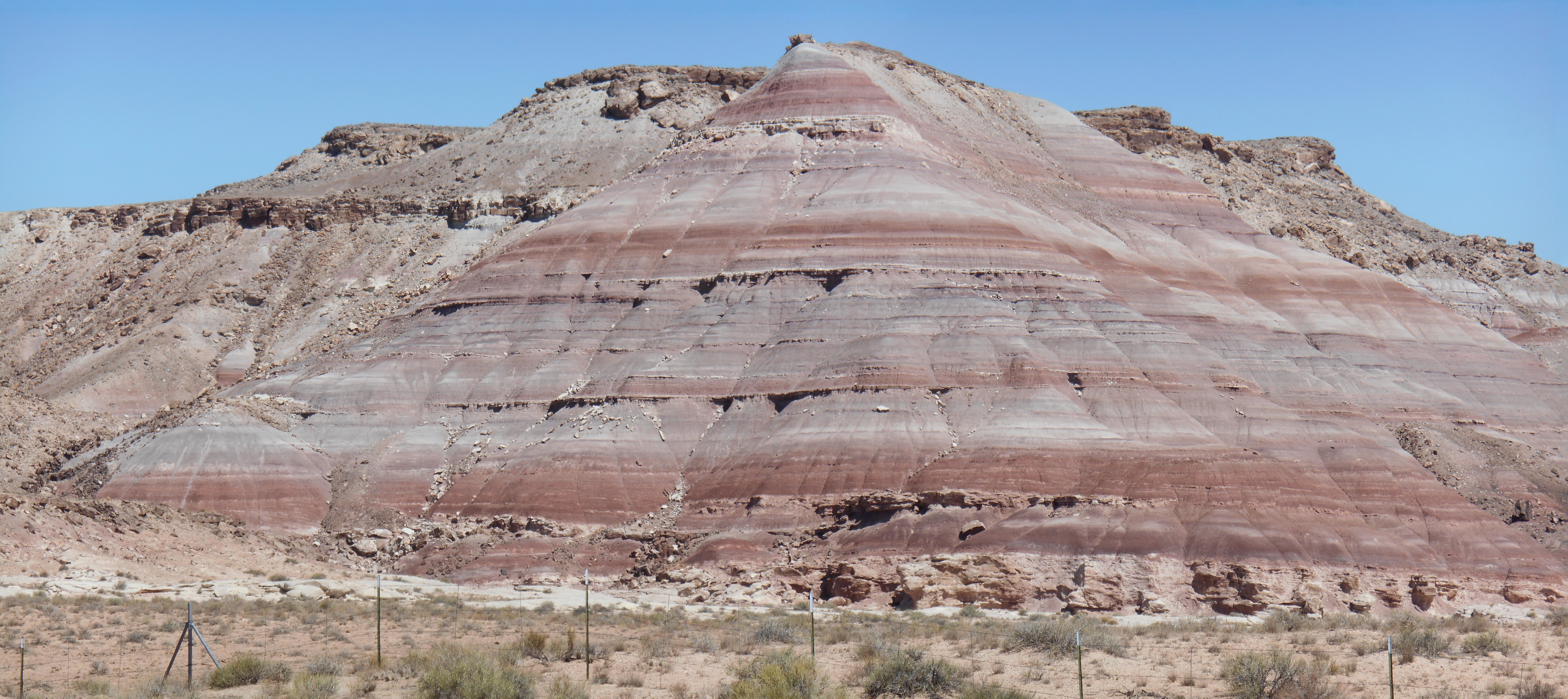
Strata of the Morrison Formation, where all apatosaurines have been found.

All known apatosaurine material has been reported from outcrops in the US states of Arizona, Colorado, Montana, New Mexico, Oklahoma, South Dakota, Utah, and Wyoming. The Morrison Formation is a sequence of shallow marine and alluvial sediments which, according to radiometric dating, ranges between 156.3 million years old (Mya) at its base, and 146.8 Mya at the top, which places it in the late Oxfordian, Kimmeridgian, and early Tithonian stages of the Late Jurassic period. This formation is interpreted as a semiarid environment with distinct wet and dry seasons. The Morrison Formation was a hotspot of sauropod evolution, with the presence of at least 6 different families of sauropods present.

Fossils of Brontosaurus are relatively uncommon whereas Apatosaurus is the second most common sauropod in the formation, after Camarasaurus. Apatosaurus and Brontosaurus may have been more solitary animals than other Morrison Formation dinosaurs. Both genera existed for a long interval, and were found in most levels of the Morrison. B. excelsus, A. ajax, and A. louisae fossils have been reported from only the Brushy Basin Member, dating to the late Kimmeridgian age, about 151 Mya. Older Brontosaurus remains have also been identified from the middle Kimmeridgian, and are assigned to B. parvus. Fossils of these animals have been found in Nine Mile Quarry and Bone Cabin Quarry in Wyoming and at sites in Colorado, Oklahoma, and Utah, present in stratigraphic zones 2–6 according to John Foster's model. Amphicoelias has been reported from a single site in Garden Park, Colorado, which bears layers dating to the lower Tithonian and come from the Brushy Basin Member.
