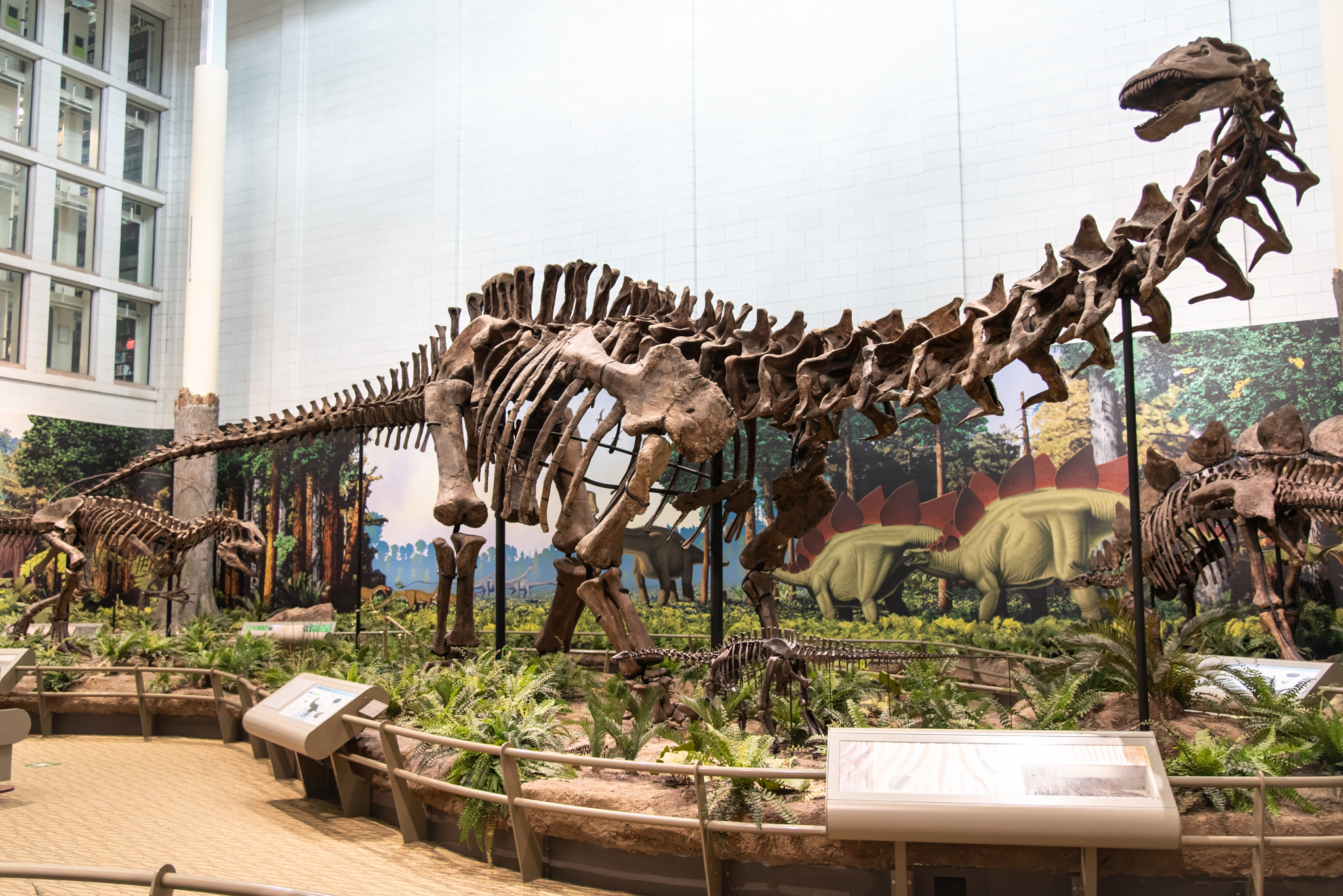
- Mounted A. louisae (specimen CM 3018), Carnegie Museum of Natural History
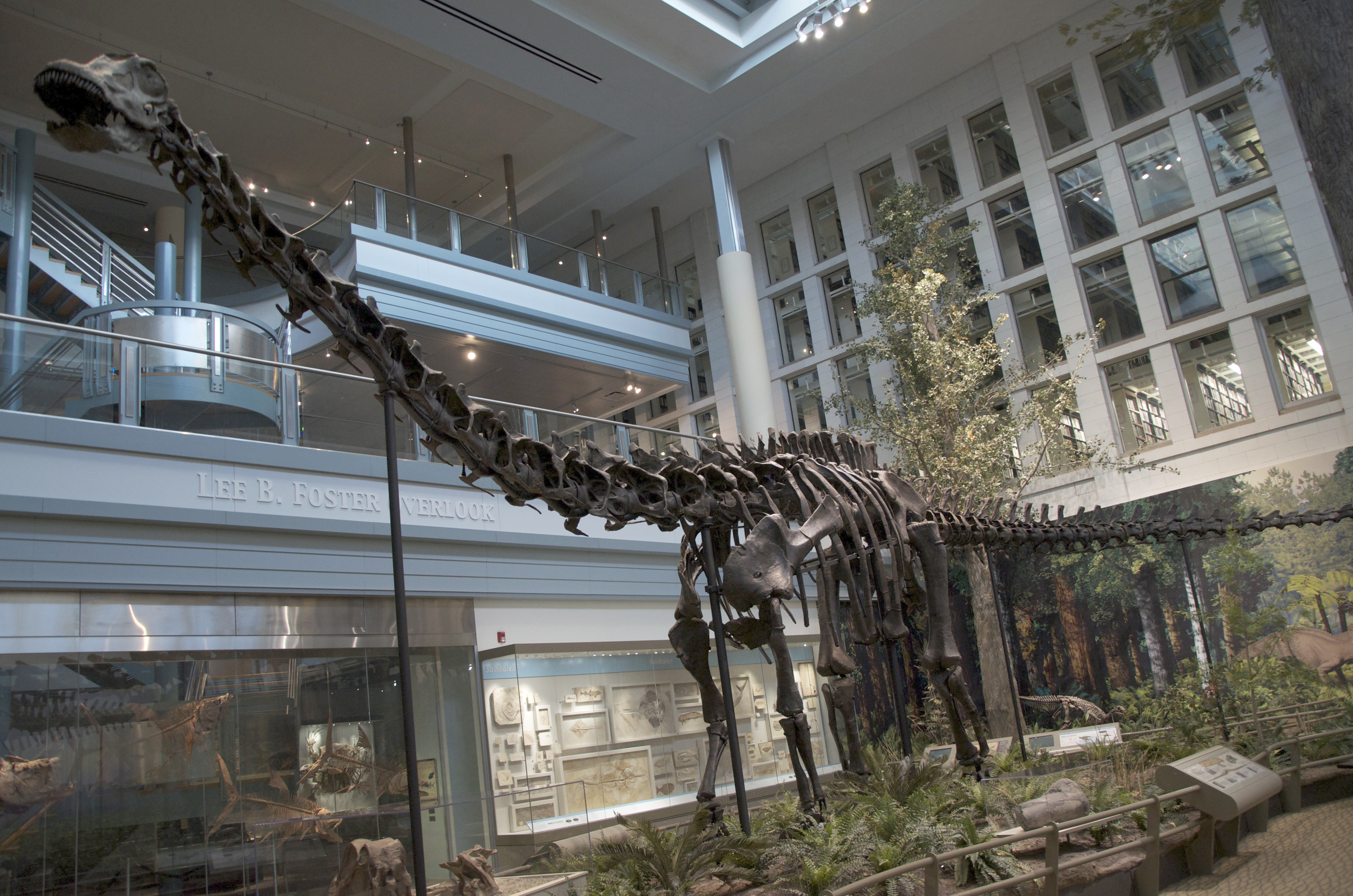
- Mounted D. carnegii type specimen, Carnegie Museum of Natural History

Scientific classification
- Kingdom: Animalia
- Phylum: Chordata
- Class: Reptilia
- Clade: Dinosauria
- Clade: Saurischia
- Clade: †Sauropodomorpha
- Clade: †Sauropoda
- Superfamily: †Diplodocoidea
- Clade: †Flagellicaudata
- Family: †Diplodocidae; Marsh, 1884

Type genus
- †Diplodocus Marsh, 1878

Subgroups
- †Amphicoelias?; †Atlantosaurus?; †Saurophaganax?; †Apatosaurinae; †Diplodocinae

Synonyms
- Atlantosauridae Marsh, 1877; Amphicoeliidae Cope, 1878; Apatosauridae Huene, 1927; Brontosauridae Jaekel, 1911

= Diplodocidae =

Diplodocids Temporal range: Middle Jurassic-Early Cretaceous, 170–136.4 Ma

Extinct family of dinosaurs

Diplodocids, or members of the family Diplodocidae ("double beams"), are a group of sauropod dinosaurs. The family includes some of the longest creatures ever to walk the Earth, including Diplodocus and Supersaurus, some of which may have reached lengths of up to 42 metres (138 ft).

== Description ==
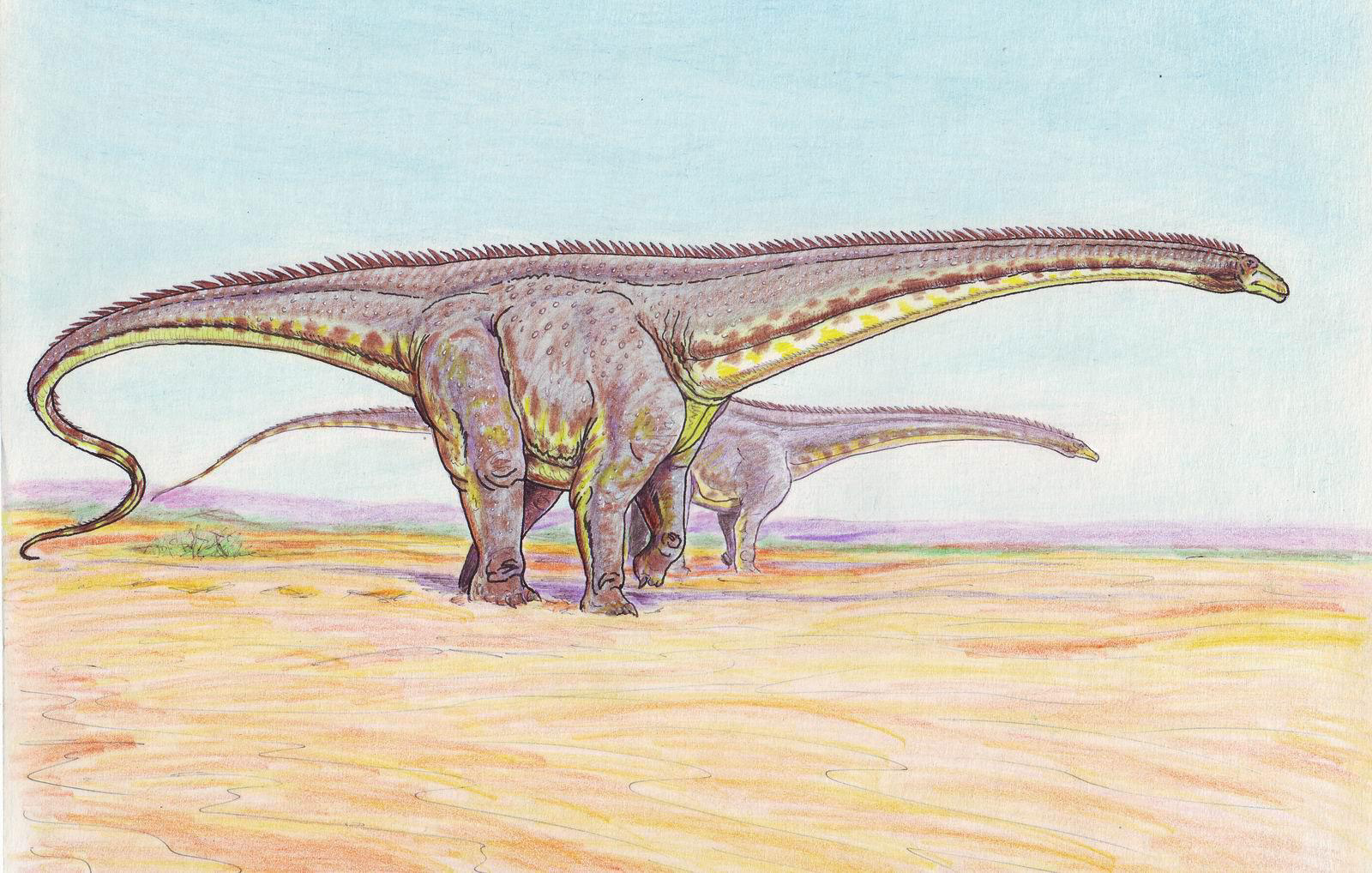
Diplodocus, depicted with spines limited to the mid-line of the back

Diplodocids were generally large animals, even by sauropod standards. Thanks to their long necks and tails, diplodocids were among the longest sauropods, with some species such as Supersaurus vivianae and Diplodocus hallorum estimated to have reached lengths of 30 meters (100 ft) or more. The heaviest diplodocids, such as Supersaurus and Apatosaurus, may have weighed close to 40 tonnes. However, not all diplodocids were so large; the South American species Leinkupal laticauda was one of the smallest diplodocids, with an estimated length of only 9 meters (30 ft).

Their heads, like those of other sauropods, were tiny with the nasal openings on the top of the head (though in life the nostrils themselves would have been close to the tip of the snout).

The heads of diplodocids have been widely depicted with the nostrils on top due to the position of the nasal openings at the apex of the skull. There has been speculation over whether such a configuration meant that diplodocids may have had a trunk. A 2006 study surmised there was no paleoneuroanatomical evidence for a trunk. It noted that the facial nerve in an animal with a trunk, such as an elephant, is large as it innervates the trunk. The evidence suggests that the facial nerve is very small in diplodocids. Studies by Lawrence Witmer (2001) indicated that, while the nasal openings were high on the head, the actual, fleshy nostrils were situated much lower down on the snout.

Diplodocids had long necks, which could reach an estimated length of 15 metres (50 ft) in the largest, longest-necked species. The neck was typically composed of 15 vertebrae, though in Barosaurus, the neck probably had 16 vertebrae as the result of the incorporation of an additional vertebra from the dorsal series. The habitual neck posture of diplodocids is controversial; studies have proposed postures ranging from nearly straight and below horizontal to an S-curve that reaches vertical.

=== Distinguishing anatomical features ===
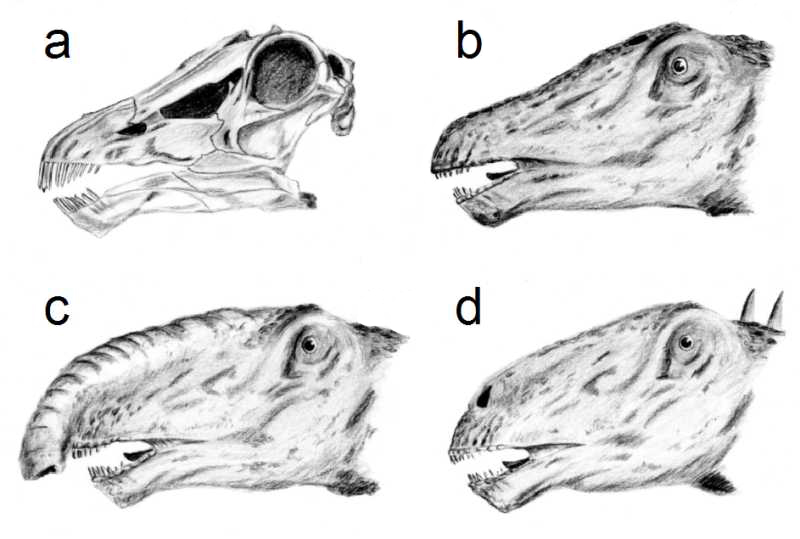
Diplodocid heads have historically been restored in various ways: a) skull, b) classic rendering of the head with nostrils on top, c) with speculative trunk, d) modern depiction with nostrils low on the snout and a possible resonating chamber

A diagnosis is a statement of the anatomical features of an organism (or group) that collectively distinguish it from all other organisms. Some, but not all, of the features in a diagnosis are also autapomorphies - distinctive anatomical features that are unique to a given organism or group.

The clade Diplodocidae is distinguished based on the following characteristics:

- nares: the external nares face dorsally; and the internarial bar is absent
- jugal: the jugal forms a substantial part of the caudoventral margin of the antorbital fenestra
- quadratojugal processes: the angle between the rostral quadratojugal process and the dorsal quadratojugal process is approximately 130°
- paroccipital process: the distal end of the paroccipital process is rounded and tongue-like in shape
- parasphenoid: the parasphenoid rostrum is a laterally compressed, thin spike and is lacking the longitudinal dorsal groove
- pterygoid: the ectopterygoid process of the pterygoid is located below the antorbital fenestra, and is reduced, such that it is not visible below the ventral margin of the skull when examined in lateral view; also the breadth of the main body of the pterygoid at least 33% of the length of the pterygoid
- teeth: at least 5-6 replacement teeth occur per alveolus (as observed in Nigersaurus)
- dorsal vertebrae: no more than 10 dorsal vertebrae are present
- caudal vertebrae: 70-80 caudal vertebrae are present
- pedal phalanges: pedal phalanx I-1 has a proximoventral margin drawn out into a thin plate or heel that underlies the distal end of metatarsal I; also pedal phalanx II-2 is reduced in craniocaudal length and has an irregular shape

=== Skin ===
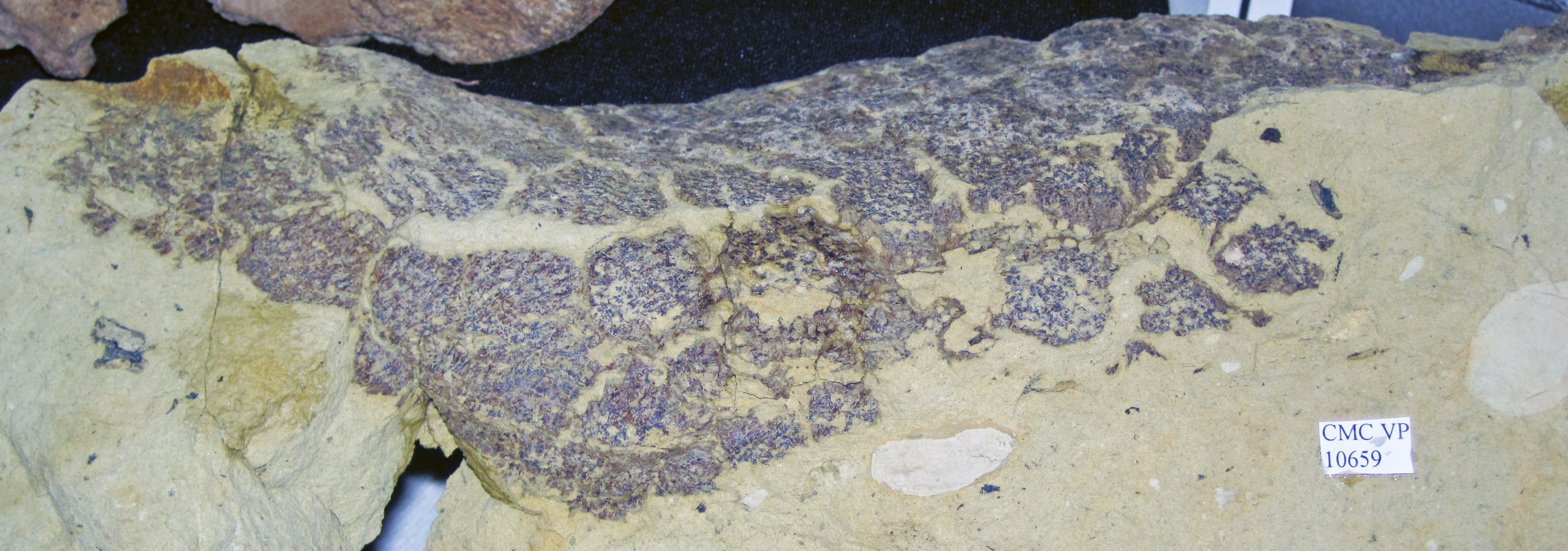
Skin impression of a diplodocid, specimen CMC VP 10659

Few skin impressions of diplodocids have been found. However, at least one significant find was reported by Stephen Czerkas in 1992. Fossils from the Howe Quarry in Shell, Wyoming preserved portions of the skin from around the tip of the tail, or "whiplash". Czerkas noted that the skin preserved a sequence of conical spines, and that other, larger spines were found scattered around larger tail vertebrae. The spines appeared to be oriented in a single row along the mid-line of the tail, and Czerkas speculated that this midline row may have continued over the animal's entire back and neck.

Skin fossils have been discovered at the Mother's Day Quarry that have been assigned to Diplodocus sp. These skin fossils exhibit a vast amount of scale diversity, the scales of which vary in shape, size, orientation, and 3-dimensional relief depending on their location on the integument. Some of the scale orientations may indicate where the skin originated on the body. For instance, a scale orientation consisting of arching rows of square scales is noted to look similar to scale orientations seen around crocodilian limbs, so it is hypothesized that this area may have come from around a limb in life. Due to the high diversity of scales seen on a relatively small area of skin, the small size of the scales, and the presence of small and juvenile individuals at the Mother's Day Quarry, it is hypothesized that the skin originated from a small or juvenile individual.

== Paleobiology ==
=== Diet and feeding ===
Their teeth were only present in the front of the mouth, and looked like pencils or pegs. They probably used their teeth to crop off food, without chewing, and relied on gastroliths (gizzard stones) to break down tough plant fibers (similar to modern birds). Diplodocines have highly unusual teeth compared to other sauropods. The crowns are long and slender, and elliptical in cross-section, while the apex forms a blunt, triangular point. The most prominent wear facet is on the apex, though unlike all other wear patterns observed within sauropods, diplodocine wear patterns are on the labial (cheek) side of both the upper and lower teeth.

This implies that the feeding mechanism of Diplodocus and other diplodocids was radically different from that of other sauropods. Unilateral branch stripping is the most likely feeding behavior of Diplodocus, as it explains the unusual wear patterns of the teeth (coming from tooth–food contact). In unilateral branch stripping, one tooth row would have been used to strip foliage from the stem, while the other would act as a guide and stabilizer. With the elongated preorbital (in front of the eyes) region of the skull, longer portions of stems could be stripped in a single action. Also, the palinal (backwards) motion of the lower jaws could have contributed two significant roles to feeding behaviour: 1) an increased gape, and 2) allowed fine adjustments of the relative positions of the tooth rows, creating a smooth stripping action.

Young et al. (2012) used biomechanical modelling to examine the performance of the diplodocine skull. It was concluded that the proposal that its dentition was used for bark-stripping was not supported by the data, which showed that under that scenario, the skull and teeth would undergo extreme stresses. The hypotheses of branch-stripping and/or precision biting were both shown to be biomechanically plausible feeding behaviors. Diplodocine teeth were also continually replaced throughout their lives, usually in less than 35 days, as was discovered by Michael D'Emic et al. Within each tooth socket, as many as five replacement teeth were developing to replace the next one. Studies of the teeth also reveal that it preferred different vegetation from the other sauropods of the Morrison, such as Camarasaurus. This may have better allowed the various species of sauropods to exist without competition.

=== Growth ===
Long-bone histology enables researchers to estimate the age that a specific individual reached. A study by Griebeler et al. (2013) examined long bone histological data and concluded that the diplodocid MfN.R.2625 weighed 4,753 kilograms (5.2 short tons), reached sexual maturity at 23 years and died at age 24. The same growth model indicated that the diplodocid MfN.R.NW4 weighed 18,463 kilograms (20.4 short tons), and died at age 23, before reaching sexual maturity.

=== Paleopathology ===
An unnamed diplodocid specimen from the Morrison Formation nicknamed "Dolly" shows evidence of a throat infection that created cauliflowered bone in the vertebral air sacs. The infection is theorized to have been similar to aspergillosis, though research is ongoing. Whether or not the infection contributed to the dinosaur's death remains unknown.

=== Tail function ===
Diplodocids also had long, whip-like tails, which were thick at the base and tapered off to be very thin at the end. Computer simulations have shown that the diplodocids could have easily snapped their tails, like a bullwhip. This could generate a sonic boom in excess of 200 decibels, and may have been used in mating displays, or to drive off predators. There is some circumstantial evidence supporting this as well: a number of diplodocids have been found with fused or damaged tail vertebrae, which may be a symptom of cracking their tails: these are particularly common between the 18th and the 25th caudal vertebra, a region the authors consider a transitional zone between the stiff muscular base and the flexible whiplike section. However, Rega (2012) notes that Camarasaurus, while lacking a tailwhip, displays a similar level of caudal co-ossification, and that Mamenchisaurus, while having the same pattern of vertebral metrics, lacks a tailwhip and doesn't display fusion in any "transitional region". Also, the crush fractures which would be expected if the tail was used as a whip have never been found in diplodocids. More recently, Baron (2020) considers the use of the tail as a bullwhip unlikely because of the potentially catastrophic muscle and skeletal damage such speeds could cause on the large and heavy tail. Instead, he proposes that the tails might have been used as a tactile organ to keep in touch with the individuals behind and on the sides in a group while migrating, which could have augmented cohesion and allowed communication among individuals while limiting more energetically demanding activities like stopping to search for dispersed individuals, turning to visually check on individuals behind, or communicating vocally.

== Classification ==
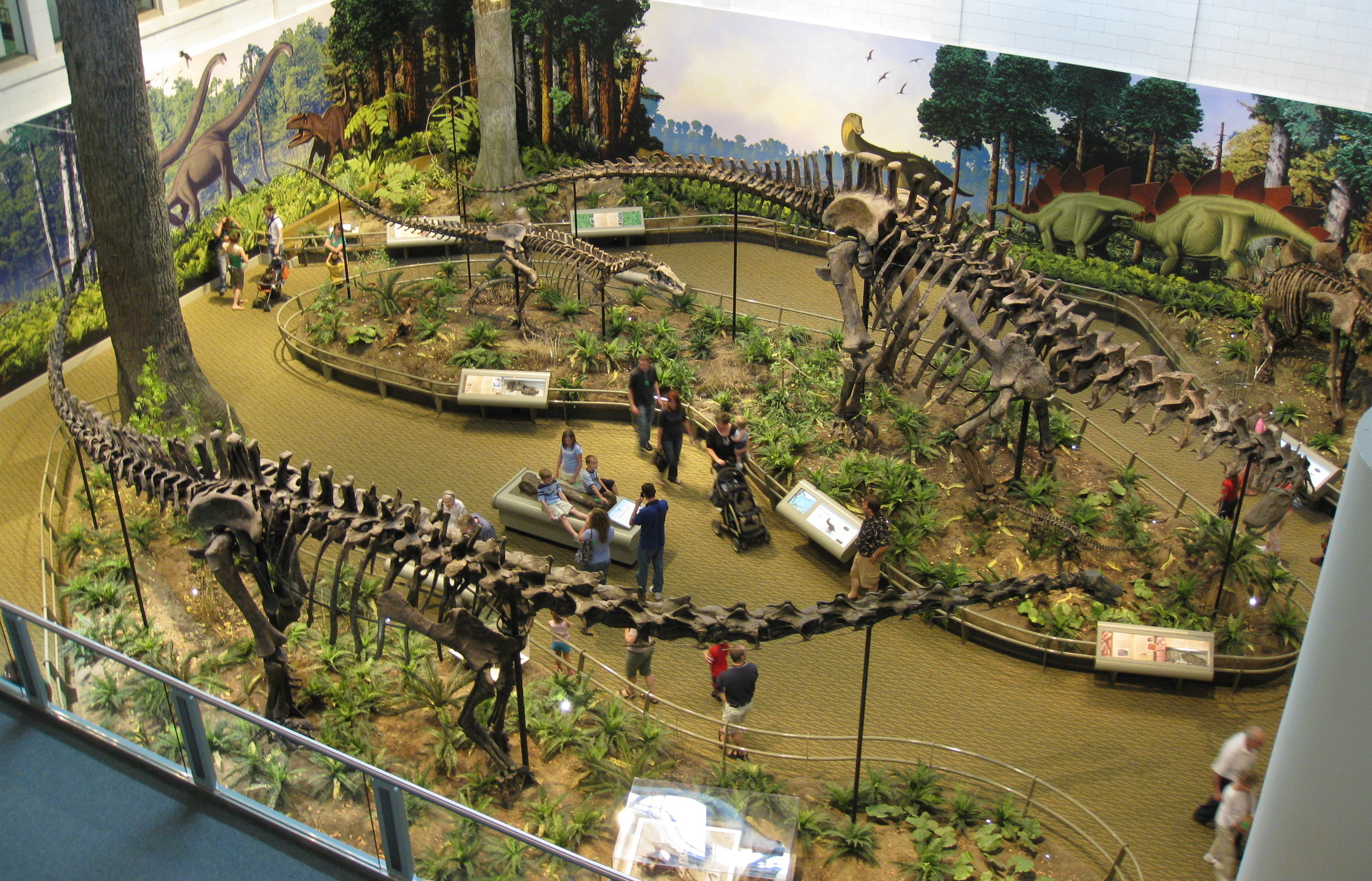
Holotype specimens of Diplodocus carnegii and Apatosaurus louisae at Carnegie Museum of Natural History

Diplodocidae was the third name given to what is now recognized as the single family of long-necked, whip-tailed sauropods. Edward Drinker Cope named the family Amphicoeliidae in 1878 for his genus Amphicoelias, sometimes considered a diplodocid. However, the name Amphicoeliidae did not come into wider use and was not used in the scientific literature after 1899, making it a nomen oblitum ("forgotten name") according to the ICZN, preventing it from displacing the name Diplodocidae as a senior synonym. More recent studies have also shown that Amphicoelias itself does not belong to this family, but is instead a more primitive diplodocoid. A similar situation occurred for the family name Atlantosauridae, named by Othniel Charles Marsh in 1877, and which Hay argued had priority over Amphicoeliidae. George Olshevsky declared Atlantosauridae a nomen oblitum in 1991, though scientists such as Steel and Nowinski had treated Atlantosauridae as a valid name as late as 1971, and the former even added a subfamily, Atlantosaurinae.

Some dinosaurs have been considered diplodocids in the past but have not been found to be members of that group in later, larger analyses of the family's relationships. Australodocus, for example, was initially described as a diplodocid, but may actually have been a Macronarian. Amphicoelias was traditionally considered a diplodocid due to its similar anatomy, but phylogenetic studies showed it to be a more basal member of the Diplodocoidea.

The relationships of species within Diplodocidae has also been subject to frequent revision. A study by Lovelace, Hartman and Wahl in 2008 found that Suuwassea and Supersaurus were relatives of Apatosaurus, within the subfamily Apatosaurinae. However, a subsequent analysis by Whitlock in 2011 showed that Supersaurus is slightly closer to Diplodocus than to Apatosaurus, and that Suuwassea is actually a primitive dicraeosaurid.

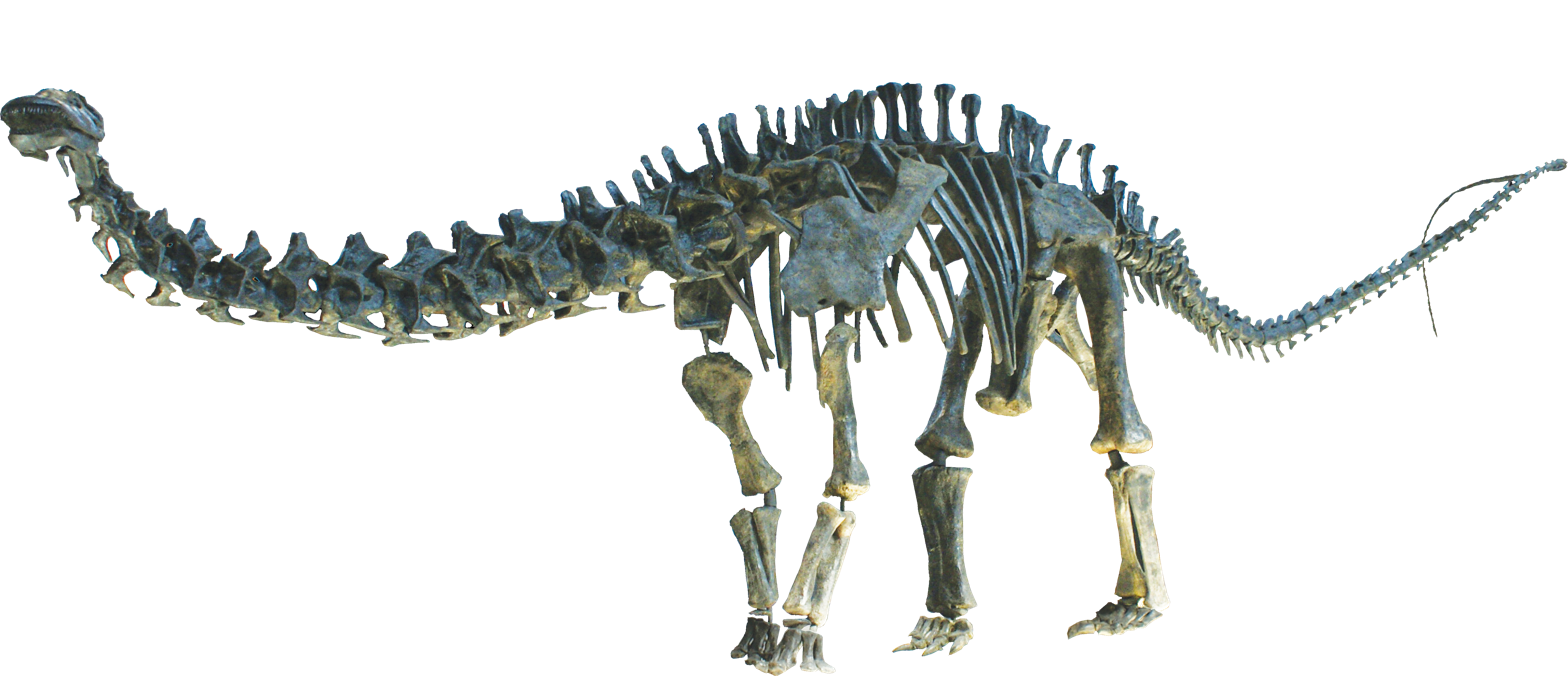
Cast skeleton of Brontosaurus parvus based on the University of Wyoming specimen produced by Triebold Paleontology Incorporated

The subfamily Diplodocinae, was erected to include Diplodocus and its closest relatives, including Barosaurus. The Portuguese Dinheirosaurus and the African Tornieria have also been identified as close relatives of Diplodocus by some authors.

Cladogram of the Diplodocidae after Tschopp, Mateus, and Benson (2015).

- Diplodocidae
  - Amphicoelias altus
  - - Apatosaurinae
      - Unnamed species
      - - - Apatosaurus ajax
          - Apatosaurus louisae
        - - Brontosaurus excelsus
          - - Brontosaurus yahnahpin
            - Brontosaurus parvus
    - Diplodocinae
      - Unnamed species
      - - Tornieria africana
        - - - Supersaurus lourinhanensis
            - Supersaurus vivianae
          - - Leinkupal laticauda
            - - Galeamopus hayi
              - - - Diplodocus carnegii
                  - Diplodocus hallorum
                - - Kaatedocus siberi
                  - Barosaurus lentus

== Evolution and biogeography ==
Diplodocids probably evolved in North America, where most diplodocid fossils are found. However, diplodocids have been found on most continents, including South America, Europe, and Africa. Diplodocids and their close relatives, dicraeosaurids, must have diverged from each other by the time the earliest known dicraeosaurid, Lingwulong, appears in the fossil record. Lingwulong was originally thought to be possibly as old as Early Jurassic, but is now considered to date to the late Middle Jurassic.

Most diplodocids lived during the Jurassic period, but they survived into the Early Cretaceous, at least in Africa and South America. An unnamed diplodocid is known from the Kirkwood Formation of South Africa. Leinkupal laticauda is from the Bajada Colorada Formation of Argentina, and indeterminate diplodocid material is known from the nearby Mulichinco Formation of similar age.
