= Autonym (botany) =

Automatically created scientific name

In botanical nomenclature, autonyms are automatically created names, as regulated by the International Code of Nomenclature for algae, fungi, and plants that are created for certain subdivisions of genera and species, those that include the type of the genus or species. An autonym might not be mentioned in the publication that creates it as a side-effect. Autonyms "repeat unaltered" the genus name or species epithet of the taxon being subdivided, and no other name for that same subdivision is validly published (article 22.2). For example, Rubus subgenus Eubatus is not validly published, and the subgenus is known as Rubus subgen. Rubus.

Autonyms are cited without an author. The publication date of the autonym is taken to be the same as that of the subdivision(s) that automatically established the autonym, with some special provisions (the autonym is considered to have priority over the other names of the same rank established at the same time (article 11.6)).

Articles 6.8, 22.1-3 and 26.1-3 relate to establishing autonyms.

Autonyms are not created if the name of the genus or species being subdivided is illegitimate.

== Definition ==
The definition of an autonym is in Art. 6.8 of the ICN:

"6.8. Autonyms are such names as can be established automatically under Art. 22.3 and 26.3, whether or not they appear in print in the publication in which they are created"

"22.3. The first instance of valid publication of a name of a subdivision of a genus under a legitimate generic name automatically establishes the corresponding autonym (see also Art. 11.6 and 32.8)." The form of this autonym is described in the earlier Art. 22.1: "The name of any subdivision of a genus that includes the type of the [...] name of the genus to which it is assigned is to repeat the generic name unaltered as its epithet, not followed by an author citation [...] Such names are termed autonyms".

"26.3. The first instance of valid publication of a name of an infraspecific taxon under a legitimate species name automatically establishes the corresponding autonym (see also Art. 32.8 and 11.6)." And as above, but now for infraspecific taxa, Art. 26.1 says: "The name of any infraspecific taxon that includes the type of the [...] name of the species to which it is assigned is to repeat the specific epithet unaltered as its final epithet, not followed by an author citation [...] Such names are termed autonyms".

== Interpretation ==
The application of names of taxonomic groups is determined by means of nomenclatural types (Principle II of the ICN). For all taxa, nomenclatural types are preserved specimens or illustrations.

In the case of an infraspecific taxon, if a botanist described a new taxon and publishes a new name at infraspecific level, all elements that previously belonged to the species (and are not included in the newly described taxon) now become a new infraspecific taxon. But as neither the type nor the final epithet has changed, there is no need for a change in author citation.

The same goes for a subdivision of a genus. If a botanist creates a new subdivision of a genus, for example by dividing a large genus into two or more subgenera, sections, or series, then a new subdivision of the genus at each of the new ranks will share the type of the genus and have as its epithet the name of the genus.

As will be clear from the definition, an autonym can be one of two kinds:

- for a taxon at a rank below that of genus and above that of species (technically a "subdivision of genus", but loosely speaking an "infrageneric taxon"), in which case its epithet repeats the generic name (Art. 22), for example

Magnolia L. sect. Magnolia, automatically established when A.P. de Candolle published sect. Gwillimia DC., in: Syst. Nat. 1 (1817): 455.

- for a taxon at a rank below that of species (an infraspecific taxon), in which case the infraspecific epithet repeats the specific epithet (Art. 26), for example

Elmerrillia papuana (Schltr.) Dandy var. papuana, automatically established when var. glaberrima Dandy, and var. adpressa Dandy were published.

== Other provisions concerning autonyms ==
The name of a subdivision of a genus that includes the type of the genus is not validly published if its epithet does not repeat the generic name unaltered, in other words: it may not be anything other than an autonym, for example

When Seringe published Magnolia L. subgen. Gwillimia Ser., in: Fl. Jard. 3 (1849): 222, the autonym Magnolia L. subgen. Magnolia was automatically established. When the latter was named Magnolia L. subgen. Eumagnolia by Seringe, same publication, p. 224, that name was not validly published as it included Magnolia virginiana L., the type of the genus. The autonym however, was validly published, even though it did not appear in print.

The same goes, mutatis mutandis, for infraspecific taxa.

An autonym is considered to have been published at exactly the same time as the earliest name(s) in that particular rank under the genus or species.

When Rehder & Wilson in C.S. Sargent, Pl. Wilson. 1 (1913): 392, published Magnolia officinalis Rehder & E.H. Wilson var. biloba, they established at the same time Magnolia officinalis Rehder & E.H. Wilson var. officinalis, even though that name was nowhere mentioned in Plantae Wilsonianae.

The autonym has nomenclatural priority over the name (or the names, as the case may be) that established it (Art. 11.6).

When Heracleum sibiricum L., with subsp. lecokii (Godr. & Gren.) Nyman and subsp. sibiricum (autonym), is placed under Heracleum sphondylium L. as a subspecies, then the correct name of the subspecies is Heracleum sphondylium L. subsp. sibiricum (L.) Simonk. This can be viewed as uniting the subspecies lecokii and the subspecies sibiricum into one subspecies, and as such a choice has to be made between the two subspecies names; the autonym sibiricum has priority.

The type of an autonym is the same as that for the corresponding genus or species (Art. 7.6): "The type of an autonym is the same as that of the name from which it is derived." As an autonym is automatically created (without an author being involved), no author citation follows the name.

== See also ==
- Principle of Coordination — a similar concept in the International Code of Zoological Nomenclature differs in that names are established at different ranks
