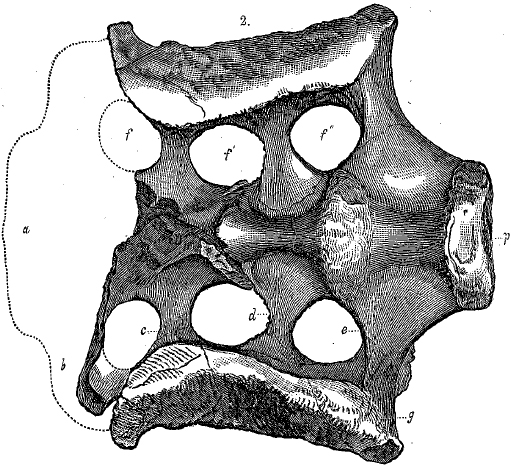
- Illustration of the sacrum of A. montanus

Scientific classification
- Kingdom: Animalia
- Phylum: Chordata
- Class: Reptilia
- Clade: Dinosauria
- Clade: Saurischia
- Clade: †Sauropodomorpha
- Clade: †Sauropoda
- Superfamily: †Diplodocoidea
- Family: †Diplodocidae
- Genus: †Atlantosaurus; Marsh, 1877
- Species: †A. montanus

Binomial name
- †Atlantosaurus montanus (Marsh, 1877)

Possible species
- †A. immanis? Marsh, 1878

Synonyms
- Titanosaurus montanus Marsh, 1877 (preoccupied)

= Atlantosaurus =

Atlantosaurus Temporal range: Late Jurassic, 150 Ma

Extinct genus of dinosaurs

Atlantosaurus (meaning "Atlas lizard") is a dubious genus of sauropod dinosaur. It contains a single species, Atlantosaurus montanus, from the Late Jurassic upper Morrison Formation of Colorado, United States. Atlantosaurus was the first sauropod to be described during the infamous 19th century Bone Wars, during which scientific methodology suffered in favor of pursuit of academic acclaim.

== History ==
The type specimen, YPM 1835, found by Arthur Lakes in Lakes Quarry Number 1 in the Morrison Formation of Colorado, United States, was named and described by Othniel Charles Marsh, Professor of Paleontology at Yale University (then called Yale College), in July 1877 as Titanosaurus montanus. Marsh soon learned that the name Titanosaurus had already been used earlier that year by Richard Lydekker to describe a different sauropod from India, so he renamed it Atlantosaurus montanus. Marsh estimated the length of the animal at twenty-four metres, "if built like a crocodile".

The skeletal remains discovered, two or three posterior sacral vertebrae connected to the ilia, were initially distinguished by their immense size and by the pleurocoels (air-filled pockets) in the vertebrae. However, since the time of its discovery, these features have been found to be widespread among sauropods, making it nearly impossible to distinguish the two known vertebrae of Atlantosaurus from those of its relatives. Since it is unclear whether or not Atlantosaurus montanus actually represents a distinct species, it is considered a nomen dubium ("dubious name"), though some researchers have considered it a likely synonym of Apatosaurus ajax.

In 1878, Marsh named a second species, Atlantosaurus immanis, "the immense one", based on holotype YPM 1840, a nearly complete postcranial skeleton, also found by Lakes, in Quarry Number 10. Marsh estimated its length at thirty-five metres from a presumed thighbone length of 2.5 metres. Later the femur length was determined at 1.95 metres. "A." immanis was in 2015 identified as a dubious member of the Apatosaurinae separate from Apatosaurus and Brontosaurus, but did not examine its relationship with Atlantosaurus montanus.

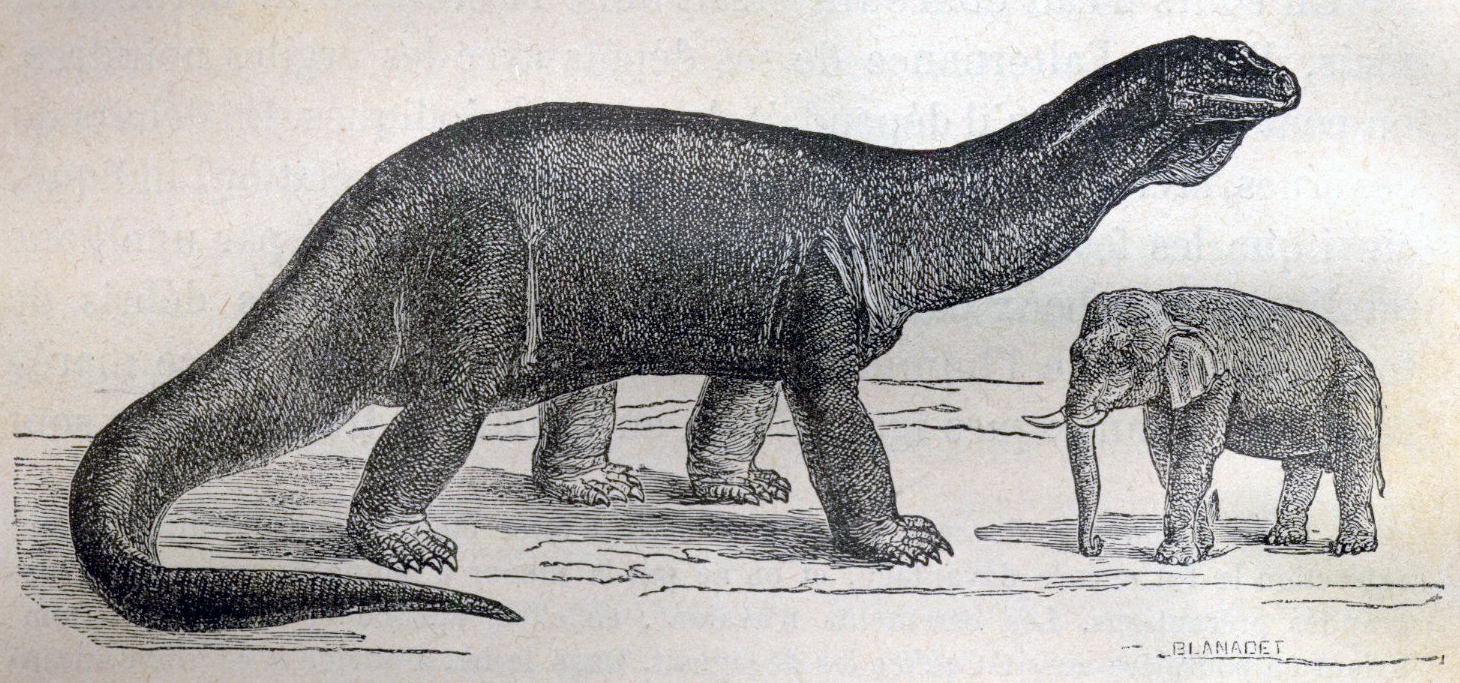
Early life restoration of Atlantosaurus immanis, at the time seen as the largest land animal in history

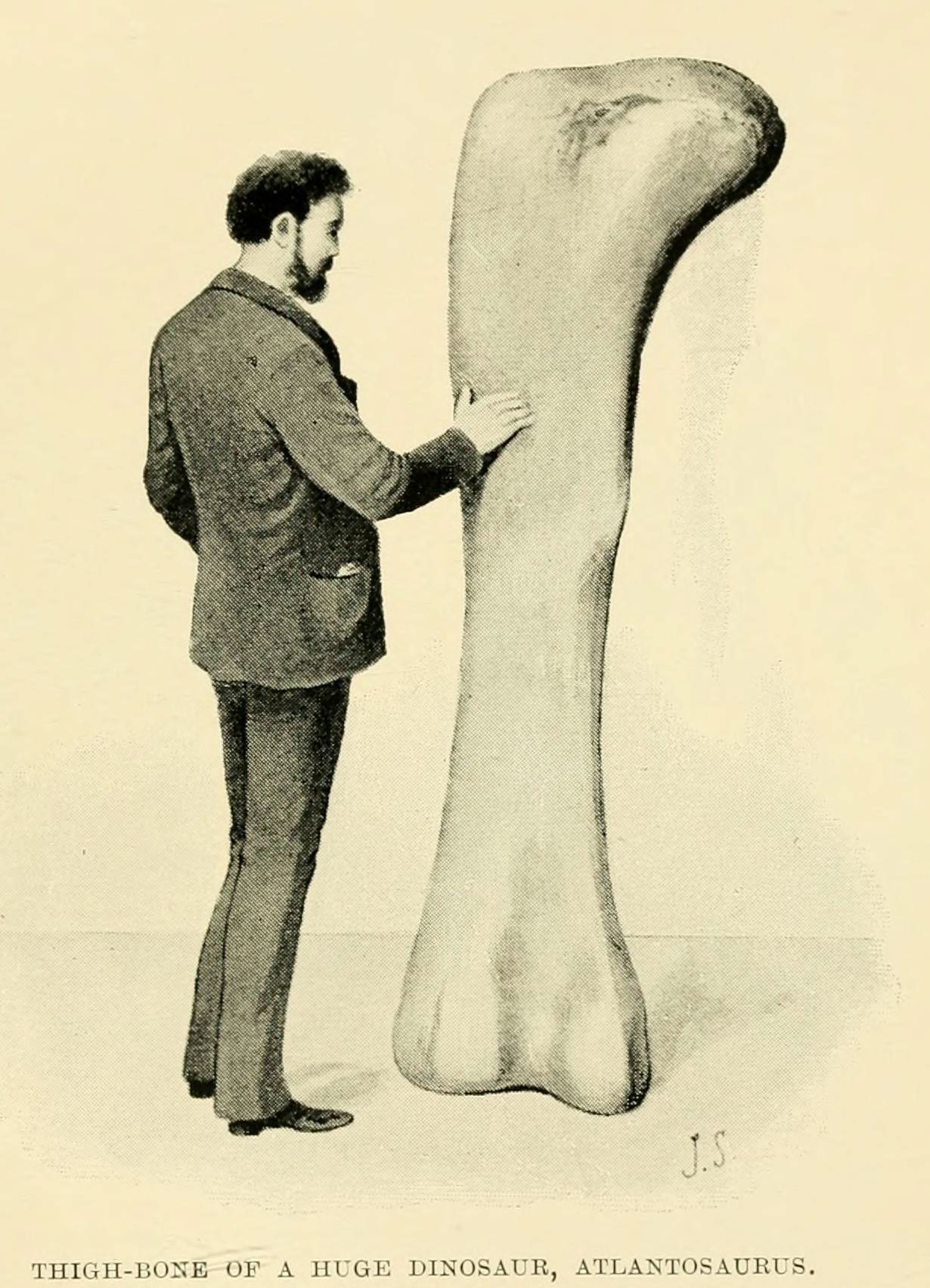
Image of the cast of the femur of Atlantosaurus immanis. From a cast in the Natural History Museum, London. Length 6 feet, 2 inches. Plate XVIII
