= Sauropod neck posture =

Subject debated among scientists

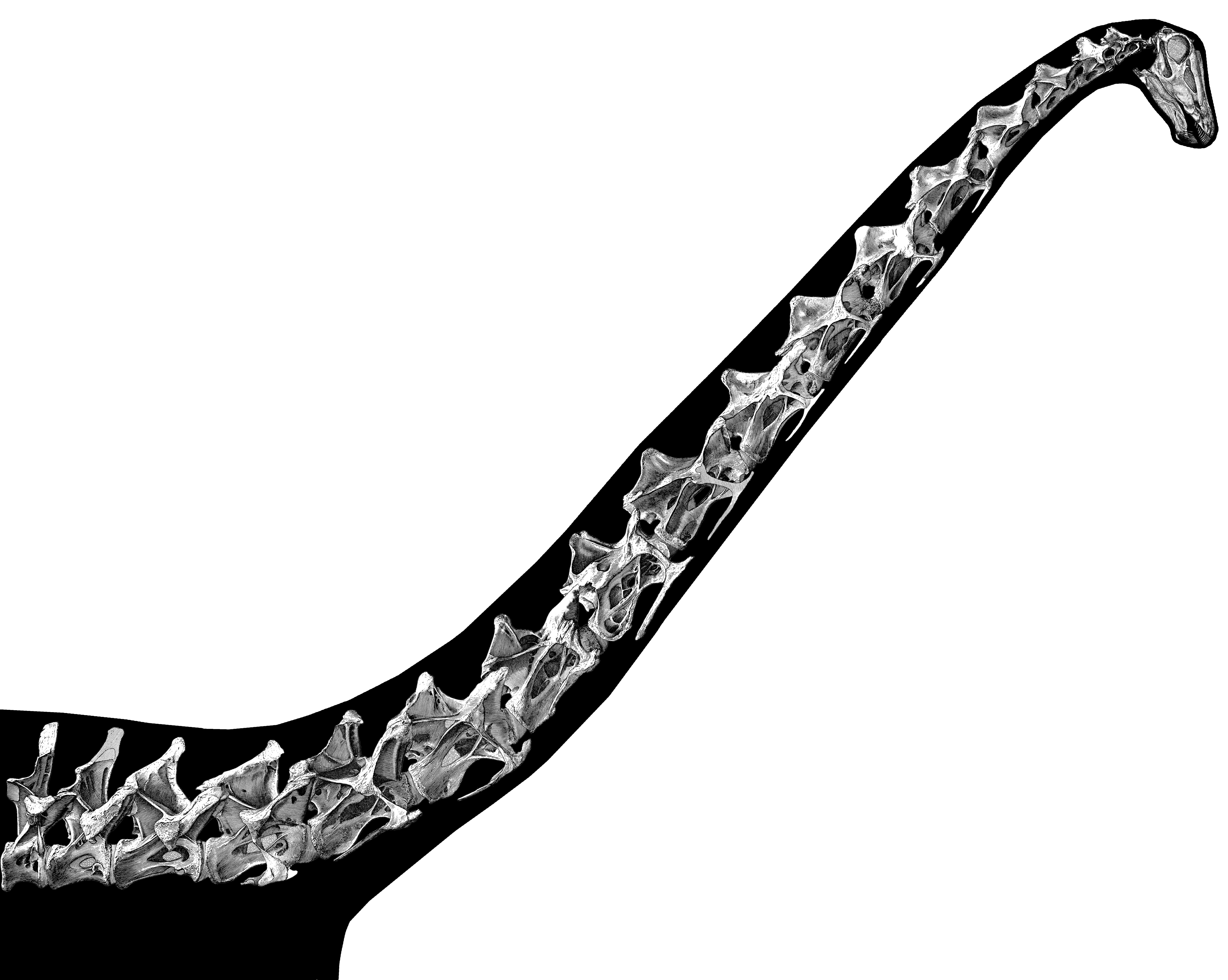
Diplodocus restored with an upright posture, based on comparison with living animals, from Taylor et al., 2009

Sauropod neck posture is a subject occasionally debated among scientists, with some favoring postures closer to horizontal whilst others a more upright posture. Research has looked at various avenues of evidence and analysis including: attempting to reconstruct the neutral posture of their necks and estimating range of motion by studying the bones; attempting to reconstruct sauropod metabolism and the energy requirements of sustaining incredibly long necks in various postures; and comparing sauropod neck anatomy to those of living animals.

== Biomechanics ==
The biomechanics of sauropod skeletons and necks can help determine at what angle the neck was positioned.

=== Flexibility ===
In 2013, a study led by Matthew J. Cobley and published in PLOS ONE focused on the flexibility of the necks of sauropods. They compared the necks of ostriches with sauropod genera to find out how flexible the necks really were. The study noted that previous biomechanics studies found the necks to have been positioned between the extremes of a vertical, and a downward slanted neck. In conclusion, the study found that sauropod neck flexibility should not be based on osteology alone, and if it is, the results should be used with caution. Even though there is a lack of preserved muscle tissue that would determine flexibility, sauropod necks were probably less flexible than previously thought.

In 2014, Mike P. Taylor analysed the flexibility in the necks of Apatosaurus and Diplodocus. He found that Cobley et al. was incorrect in the fact that vertebrae imply the neck is less flexible than in actuality. Cobley et al. found necks to be much less flexible than in reality when cartilage was added. It was found that the cartilage between the joints would have allowed for the neck to flex far past 90°. However, Taylor noted that while the neck could flex above the vertical, the osteological neutral pose would have been around horizontal, with the habitual pose having the head held upwards in an alert pose.

=== Muscling ===
Sauropod necks were probably highly muscled to suit their feeding level. Brachiosaurus brancai (now Giraffititan) was probably a high browser, so it would have been more muscled along the neck than other sauropods like Diplodocus and Dicraeosaurus interpreted as low browsers. The tail and limb length of B. brancai would also need to be greater, to balance out the inclined neck. However, the question of whether sauropods were endothermic or ectothermic plays a major part in how sauropods were muscled, as endotherms have particularly more intestines and stomach than ectotherms. The amount of gut needed could determine how much food was eaten by sauropods, and therefore at what elevation their heads were held.

=== Heart and metabolic stress ===
The upright posture of sauropod necks is seen by some as requiring implausibly high blood pressure and heart strength. A 2000 study conducted by Roger Seymour and Harvey Lillywhite found that the blood pressure needed to reach the head with an upright neck would be 700 millimetres of mercury (28 inHg), interpreted as fatal to an endotherm, or highly dangerous to an ectotherm, even with adequate heart musculature. A later study by Seymour concluded that it would have required half the animal's energy intake to pump the blood to the head. This would disfavor sauropods being high browsers, and instead having lower necks while feeding than commonly portrayed.

The above work summarily dismisses the hypothesis of secondary hearts in the neck as evolutionarily implausible, assuming arterial valves could have no role without associated musculature.

== Hypotheses ==
Restored posture of Opisthocoelicaudia from the original description (A), and by Schwartz et al. (B)

A few hypotheses have been generated to solve the dispute over how sauropods held their necks.

=== Horizontal pose ===
Kent Stevens and Michael Parrish have been the two main supporters of a horizontal neck posture. In 1999, they studied the genera Apatosaurus and Diplodocus, finding the habitual pose of the genera to be slightly declined. They claimed that both sauropods had necks much less flexible than previously thought, with the neck vertebrae of Diplodocus being more inflexible than Apatosaurus. Those two poses would suggest that the sauropods were ground feeders, instead of browsing off taller flora. Later, in 2005, Stevens and Parrish studied the biomechanics of sauropod necks on a wider variety of sauropods, from the Jurassic: Apatosaurus, Diplodocus, Camarasaurus, Brachiosaurus, Dicraeosaurus, Cetiosaurus, and Euhelopus. All were stated to have a horizontal, or even declining neck.

However, in 2009 multiple flaws were found with this argument. Michael P. Taylor et al. compared the neck posture of sauropods to that of extant reptiles and other tetrapods, finding these animals' habitual poses to be entirely different from the assumptions of Stevens and Parrish. The latters' errors come mainly from their preconceptions about animals' habitual pose in life, which they simply assumed would naturally match the Osteological Neutral Pose (or ONP). Taylor et al. find the ONP to be, not the actual habitual pose of any examined animal, but an arbitrarily chosen midpoint between the two structural extremes of bone placement. ONP, then, is merely one place in the range of physically possible motion.

=== Incline pose ===
Another, more widely supported hypothesis about sauropod neck posture is that the necks were held at an incline, but not as upright as commonly shown. Daniela Schwartz et al. in 2006 published a study of the scapula and coracoids, sometimes fused into scapulocoracoids, of sauropod genera. Previously, sauropod shoulder girdles were thought to have been positioned horizontally along the torso, but Schwartz et al. found that the girdles should not have been positioned horizontally, and instead, they would have been angled at an average of 55° to 65°. The study reconstructed the skeletons of Diplodocus, Camarasaurus, and the titanosaur Opisthocoelicaudia, all known from a complete shoulder girdle, with the correct orientation of the scapulocoracoids. For Diplodocus, a 60° shoulder blade would have meant that the neck was more-or-less horizontal, not too much different from the horizontal pose. A juvenile Camarasaurus found by Gilmore was originally described as having the scapulocoracoid in "just the right place", but with it oriented at an angle of 45°, Schwartz et al. criticized the stance. The skeleton found by Schwartz et al. with the angle of the scapulocoracoid is similar to previous reconstruction of the genus by Osborn and Mook, and Jensen. Opisthocoelicaudia was found to have had two possibly poses, both with the scapulocoracoid angled at about 60°. No previous reconstructions, unlike with Camarasaurus, have restored Opisthocoelicaudia similarly.

=== Upright pose for some sauropods ===
Despite skepticism, Euhelopus and Brachiosaurus have been found on anatomical evidence to have held their necks at a vertical angle, which has been treated as impossible for sauropods. Studies have concluded that the blood pressure and energy spent holding necks erect would have been too great to survive; yet Euhelopus and Brachiosaurus, at least, did so anyhow. The energy spent by pumping blood to the head is interpreted as too great for most sauropods, but when they travel often, which has been suggested for those two genera, it would have actually saved energy. The biomechanical evidence favours an upright neck when travelling to spread apart resources. The study finding this conclusion also tested how much energy would have been expended when walking 100 m (330 ft) and standing, both with an upright neck. The approximate conclusion was that an about equal amount of energy would have been used up. Elongated cervical ribs are skeletal evidence for a strong core to support the neck and limit its movement when walking. The study supports the idea that during times of drought and famine, an upright neck was crucial for these sauropods to survive.
