= Principle of coordination =

Zoology naming convention

In zoology, the principle of coordination is one of the guiding principles of the International Code of Zoological Nomenclature.

It states that the act of publishing a new zoological name thereby automatically and simultaneously establishes all the corresponding names in the relevant other ranks, with the same type.

In the species-group, publishing the species name (the binomen) Giraffa camelopardalis Linnaeus, 1758 also establishes the subspecies name (the trinomen) Giraffa camelopardalis camelopardalis Linnaeus, 1758. The same applies to the name of a subspecies; this establishes the corresponding species name.

In the genus-group, similarly, publishing the name of a genus also establishes the corresponding name of a subgenus (or vice versa): Giraffa Linnaeus, 1758 and Giraffa (Giraffa) Linnaeus, 1758. (Here, Giraffa is the subgenus of genus Giraffa.) In the family-group, publication of the name of a family, subfamily, superfamily (or any other such rank) also establishes the names in all the other ranks in the family group.

Author citations for such names are the same as for the name actually published. It is immaterial if there is an actual taxon to which the automatically established name applies; if ever such a taxon is recognised, there is a name available for it.

== See also ==
- Autonym (botany) – a similar concept in the International Code of Nomenclature for algae, fungi, and plants differs in that names are established at the same rank
