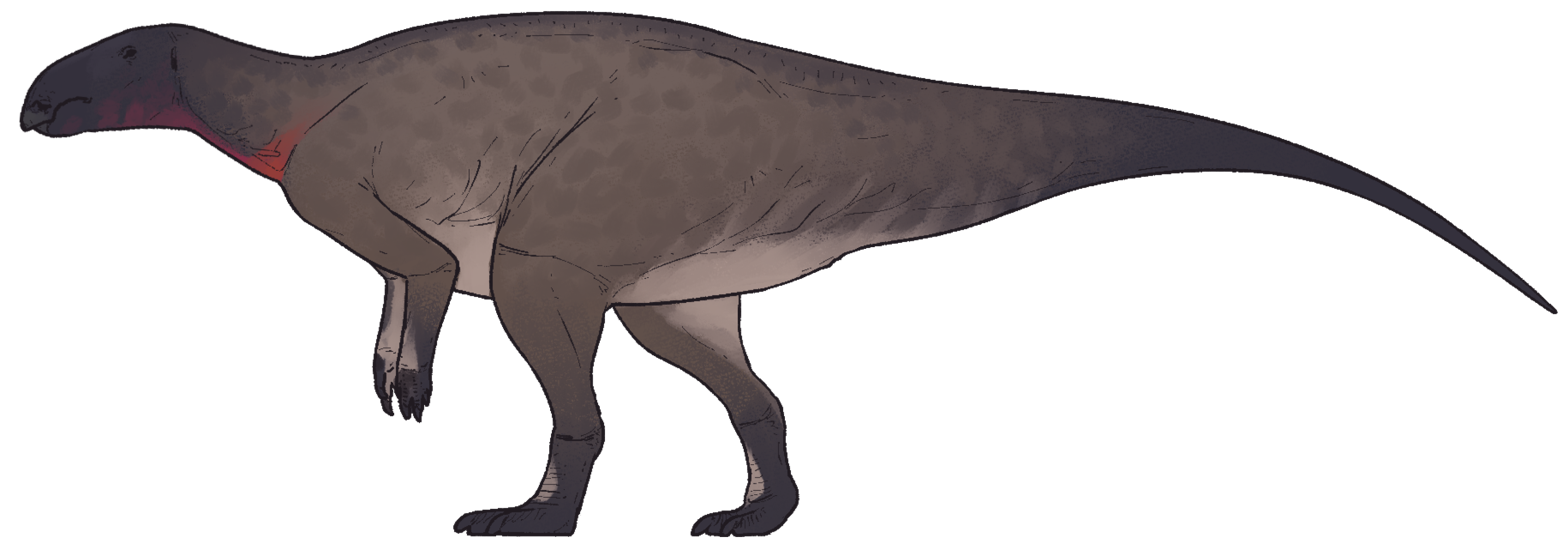
- Speculative life restoration as a rhabdodontomorph

Scientific classification
- Kingdom: Animalia
- Phylum: Chordata
- Clade: Dinosauria
- Clade: †Ornithischia
- Clade: †Ornithopoda
- Clade: †Iguanodontia
- Clade: †incertae sedis
- Genus: †Emiliasaura; Coria et al., 2025
- Species: †E. alessandrii

Binomial name
- †Emiliasaura alessandrii Coria et al., 2025

= Emiliasaura =

Emiliasaura Temporal range: Early Cretaceous Valanginian

Genus of iguanodontian dinosaurs

Emiliasaura (meaning "Emilia's lizard") is an extinct genus of iguanodontian ornithopod dinosaurs from the Early Cretaceous (Valanginian) Mulichinco Formation of Neuquén Province, Argentina. The genus contains a single species, Emiliasaura alessandrii, known from three individual specimens. Emiliasaura was initially described as a rhabdodontomorph. If this identification is correct, it would represent the oldest member of this clade and the first named from South America. However, a later analysis of rhabdodontomorphs failed to recover Emiliasaura within this clade, instead placing it as a styracosternan.

== Discovery and naming ==
Emiliasaura type locality near Las Lajas, Argentina

During the summer of 2009, Carlos Alessandri discovered productive outcrops of the Mulichinco Formation (Paraje Pilmatué locality) 9 kilometres (5.6 mi) northeast of the city of Las Lajas in Neuquén Province, Argentina. The partial skeleton of a medium-sized ornithopod was collected in March of that year, comprising part of the left scapula and coracoid, the left humerus, and a complete right hindlimb. During fieldwork conducted two years later, on the shore of Pilmatué Creek 1 km (0.62 mi) northeast of the previous quarry, a second partial ornithopod skeleton was found, comprising much of the right hindlimb and foot, parts of both pelvic girdles, three sacral and eight caudal vertebrae, nine chevrons, and associated ossified tendons. An isolated dorsal vertebra was also recovered in association with a partial skeleton referred to the sauropod Pilmatueia.

After being announced in October 2024 in a non-finalized preprint, Coria et al. (2025) described Emiliasaura alessandrii as a new genus and species of ornithopod based on these fossil remains. The first collected specimen, cataloged as MLL-Pv-001, was established as the holotype, and the second specimen, MLL-Pv-006, as the paratype. The isolated dorsal vertebra was also referred to the species. The specimens are accessioned at the Museo de Las Lajas in Argentina. The generic name, Emiliasaura, honors Emilia Ondettia de Fix, the founder of the first museum in Las Lajas. The specific name, honors Carlos Alessandri, discoverer of the holotype.

== Description ==
Based on histological research, Coria et al. (2025) identified the specimens of Emiliasaura as belonging to somatically immature, or subadult, individuals. Since bone modeling was still occurring at the time of death, the animals were likely still growing and had not reached their full body size.

== Classification ==
In their 2025 description of Emiliasaura, Coria et al. scored it in the phylogenetic dataset of Poole (2022). They found it to be the most basal member of the Rhabdodontomorpha. This would makes it the oldest known member of the clade and the first one known from South America. Their results are displayed in the cladogram below:

- Iguanodontia
  - Anabisetia
  - Trinisaura
  - Kangnasaurus
  - Planicoxa
  - Dryomorpha
  - Rhabdodontomorpha
    - Emiliasaura
    - - Muttaburrasaurus
      - - - Tenontosaurus dossi
          - Tenontosaurus tilletti
        - - Rhabdodon
          - - Zalmoxes robustus
            - Zalmoxes shqiperorum

In a later 2025 publication focused on European rhabdodontomorphs, Czepiński & Madzia included Emiliasaura in an updated version of the comprehensive phylogenetic dataset of Fonseca et al. (2024). This matrix consistently recovered Emiliasaura within Dryomorpha, as an early-diverging styracosternan. The authors concluded that, while they had not observed the material in detail, Emiliasaura can most likely be regarded as a genus outside Rhabdodontomorpha. These results (implied weighting, K=21) are displayed in the cladogram below:

- - Hypsilophodontidae
  - - Rhabdodontomorpha
    - - 'Elasmarian lineage'
      - - Callovosaurus
        - - Iyuku
          - Dryomorpha
            - - Albertadromeus
              - - - Eousdryosaurus
                  - - Valdosaurus
                    - Elrhazosaurus
                - - Dysalotosaurus
                  - Dryosaurus spp.
            - - CM 1949
              - - - Oblitosaurus
                  - Draconyx
                - - - Uteodon
                    - Camptosaurus
                  - - Cumnoria
                    - - Owenodon
                      - Emiliasaura
                      - - Hippodraco
                        - Later-diverging styracosternans

== Paleoenvironment ==
Emiliasaura is known from the Mulichinco Formation, which dates to the Valanginian age of the early Cretaceous period. Several other dinosaurs are known from this formation, including the dicraeosaurid Pilmatueia, an indeterminate diplodocid, an indeterminate possible dicraeosaurid, and the carcharodontosaurid Lajasvenator. Plants known from the formation include the tree fern Tempskya and podocarp conifer trees.
