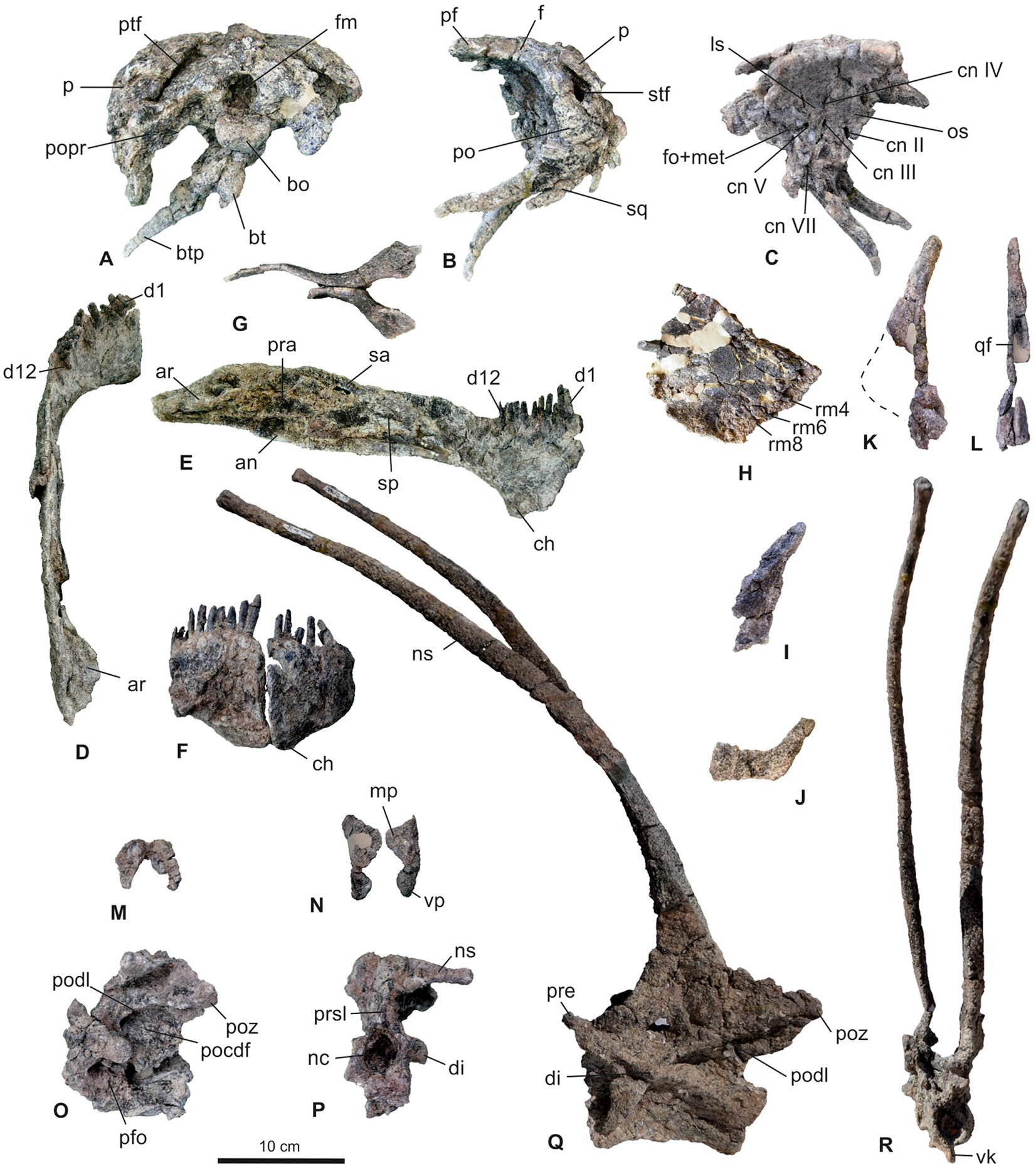
- Skeletal elements

Scientific classification
- Kingdom: Animalia
- Phylum: Chordata
- Class: Reptilia
- Clade: Dinosauria
- Clade: Saurischia
- Clade: †Sauropodomorpha
- Clade: †Sauropoda
- Clade: †Eusauropoda
- Superfamily: †Diplodocoidea
- Family: †Dicraeosauridae
- Genus: †Bajadasaurus; Gallina et al., 2019
- Species: †B. pronuspinax

Binomial name
- †Bajadasaurus pronuspinax Gallina et al., 2019

= Bajadasaurus =

Bajadasaurus Temporal range: Early Cretaceous (Late Berriasian–Valanginian), ~145–132.9 Ma

Genus of sauropod dinosaur

Bajadasaurus is a genus of sauropod dinosaur from the Early Cretaceous epoch (late Berriasian to Valanginian stages, between 145 and 132.9 million years ago) of northern Patagonia, Argentina. It was first described in 2019 based on a single specimen found in 2010 that includes a largely complete skull and parts of the neck. The only species is Bajadasaurus pronuspinax. The genus is classified as a member of the Dicraeosauridae, a group of relatively small and short-necked sauropods.

Bajadasaurus sported bifurcated (two-pronged), extremely elongated neural spines extending from the neck. Similarly elongated spines are known from the closely related and more completely known Amargasaurus. Several possible functions have been proposed for these spines in Amargasaurus; the 2019 description of Bajadasaurus suggested they could have served as a passive defense against predators in both genera. The skull was slender and equipped with around 48 teeth that were pencil-shaped and restricted to the front of the jaws. The eye openings of Bajadasaurus were exposed in top view, possibly allowing the animal to look forwards while feeding. Bajadasaurus was discovered in sedimentary rocks of the Bajada Colorada Formation, which were deposited by braided rivers. It shared its environment with other dinosaurs including the sauropods Leinkupal and Ninjatitan and different theropods.

== Discovery and naming ==
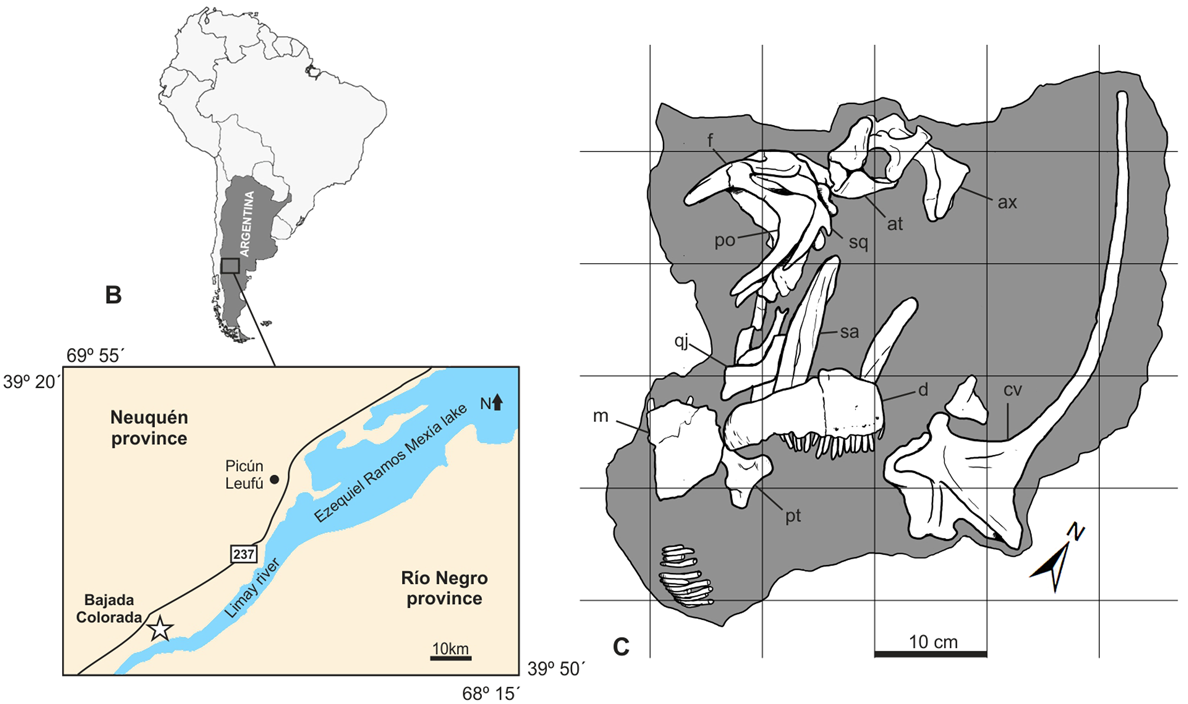
Location and quarry map of the only known specimen

The only specimen of the dinosaur genus Bajadasaurus was excavated in 2010 by palaeontologists of the CONICET (National Scientific and Technical Research Council), the science agency of the Argentinian government. The specimen was discovered in the Bajada Colorada locality, 40 kilometres (25 mi) south of the town of Picún Leufú, near the western bank of the Limay River, in Patagonia. The site is part of the Bajada Colorada Formation, a succession of sedimentary rocks in the Neuquén Basin that is dated to the late Berriasian to Valanginian stages of the Early Cretaceous (~145–132.9 million years ago). The specimen, of which only some teeth were initially exposed, was found by Argentinian palaeontologist Pablo Gallina. As fossils in this area are often fragile, the specimen was not excavated bone-by-bone in the field, but extracted as a single large block of rock and bone; before extraction, the block had been wrapped in plaster for protection. The block was prepared in a laboratory, revealing most of the skull as well as the first two and probably the fifth neck vertebrae. The specimen is now curated by the Museo Municipal Ernesto Bachmann in Villa El Chocón, Neuquén Province, under the specimen number MMCh-PV 75.

The specimen was formally described as a new genus and species, Bajadasaurus pronuspinax, by Gallina and colleagues in 2019. The generic name is derived from the Spanish word Bajada ("downhill") in reference to the Bajada Colorada locality, and the Greek saurus ("lizard"). The specific name pronuspinax is derived from the Latin pronus ("bent over forward") and the Greek spinax ("spine"), referring to the long and forward-curved neural spines (spinous processes) of the neck. Because of the spectacular spines, the discovery of Bajadasaurus was widely reported on by international news media. In 2023, Juan Garderes and colleagues published a comprehensive description of the skull based on a digital 3D reconstruction obtained from CT scans of the bones. In 2026, Garderes and colleagues applied retrodeformation to this model, a method to reverse the deformation of the bones that occurred during fossilization.

== Description ==
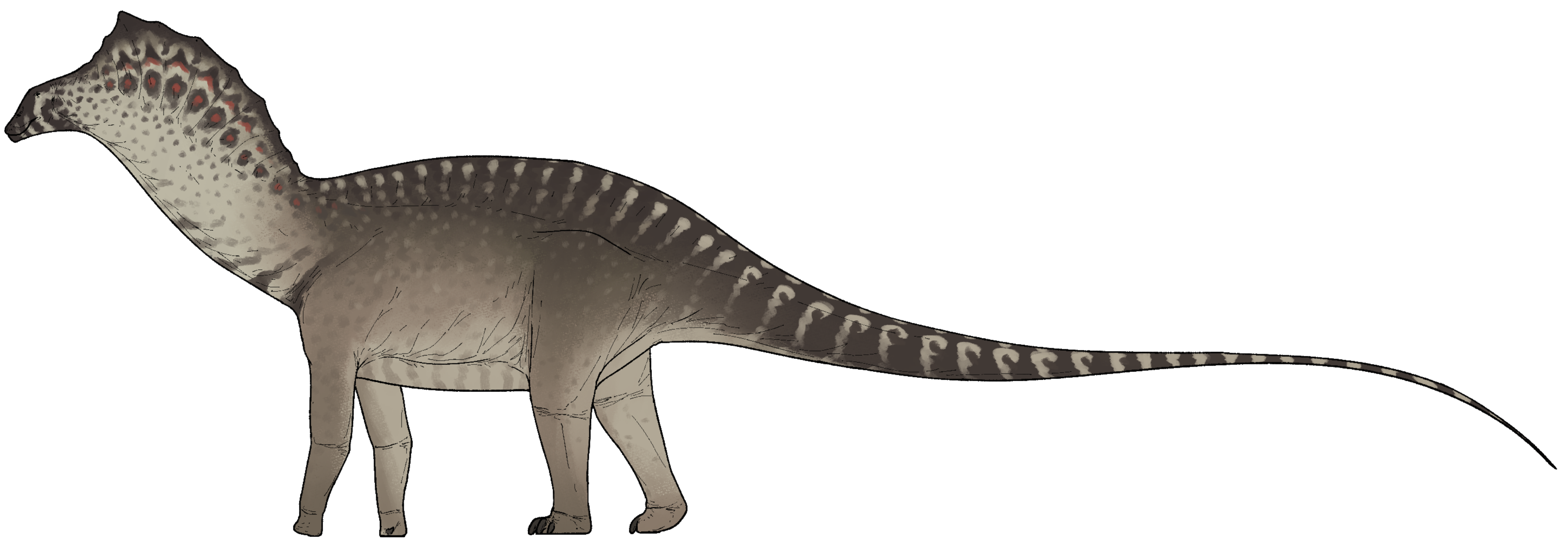
Speculative life restoration with body based on related species

Bajadasaurus is classified as a member of the Dicraeosauridae, a family of sauropod dinosaurs. As with all sauropods, dicraeosaurids were large, four-legged herbivores with a long neck and tail and a relatively tiny head. They were small compared to most other sauropods, reaching roughly the size of present-day Asian elephants, and their neck was comparatively short. Long bifurcated (two-pronged) neural spines were a common feature of the group, although they were only extremely elongated in Bajadasaurus and the closely related Amargasaurus. Bone fusion in the braincase and vertebral column indicates that the holotype represented an adult individual.

=== Skull ===
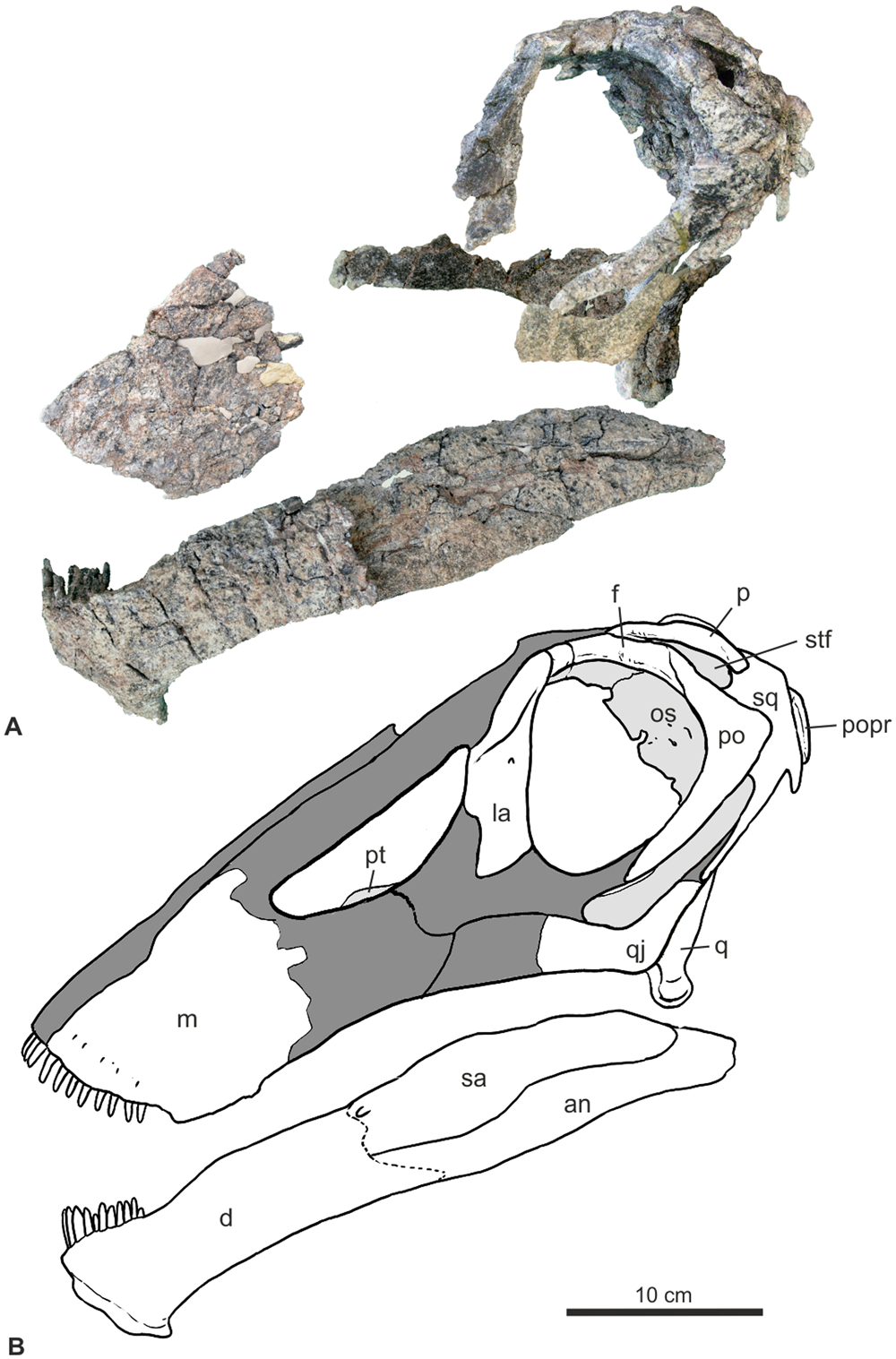
Skull in side view (top) with interpretive diagram (bottom)

As in other flagellicaudatans (the group to which dicraeosaurids and diplodocids belong), the skull was elongated with an overall slender built. The preserved skull includes the pterygoid bones of the palate, most of the skull roof and braincase, as well as the lower jaws and parts of the upper jaws. As of 2019, it is the most complete skull of a dicraeosaurid known. The middle section of the skull is not preserved. The holotype skull is affected by crushing (brittle deformation) that occurred during diagenesis, which resulted in a number of fractures. In addition, the braincase is deformed plastically (without causing fractures).

All bones that surround the orbit (eye socket) are preserved, except for the jugal bone, which would have formed the lower margin of the opening. The lacrimal bone, which formed the front margin of the orbit, had a straight ridge on its upper half that was similar to that of Dicraeosaurus. It was pierced by a small foramen (opening), similar to the larger foramen seen in Dicraeosaurus. The upper-front corner of the orbit was formed by the prefrontal bone. The contribution of the prefrontal to the orbit was smaller than in Dicraeosaurus and Amargasaurus; the bone was also smaller and less robust than in these genera. The upper rim of the orbit was formed by the frontal, which was fused to the parietal bone behind; together, these bones formed most of the rear part of the skull roof. Viewed from above, the side margin of the frontal was S-shaped and narrowed from back to front. As a result, the eye openings were visible in top view of the skull, unlike in related genera except Lingwulong. At the back, the frontal also formed a small part of the supratemporal fenestra, a major opening on the rear part of the skull roof. The rear margin of the orbit was formed by the postorbital bone. Typically in dinosaurs, this bone featured a rearwards extending process, the posterior process. In Bajadasaurus, Dicraeosaurus, and Amargasaurus, this process was reduced and indistinct. The downward projecting process of the squamosal, a bone forming the upper rear corner of the skull, was elongated, distinguishing the genus from other dicraeosaurids. This suggests that it was connected to the quadratojugal bone at the lower rear edge of the skull, although the articulation itself is not preserved. This probable articulation was absent in diplodocids, and has not previously been documented in dicraeosaurids. Below the orbit and framed by the squamosal, postorbital, quadratojugal, and jugal was the lateral temporal fenestra, another major skull opening. In Bajadasaurus, this opening was narrow and obliquely oriented. The quadratojugal formed an obtuse angle that framed the lower rear part of the lateral temporal fenestra, different from the feature seen in diplodocids. The quadrate, a column-like bone forming parts of the rear of the skull, showed an expanded ventral surface (underside) as well as a squamosal process that was elongated but not expanded at its end; both features are considered as potential autapomorphies of Bajadasaurus.

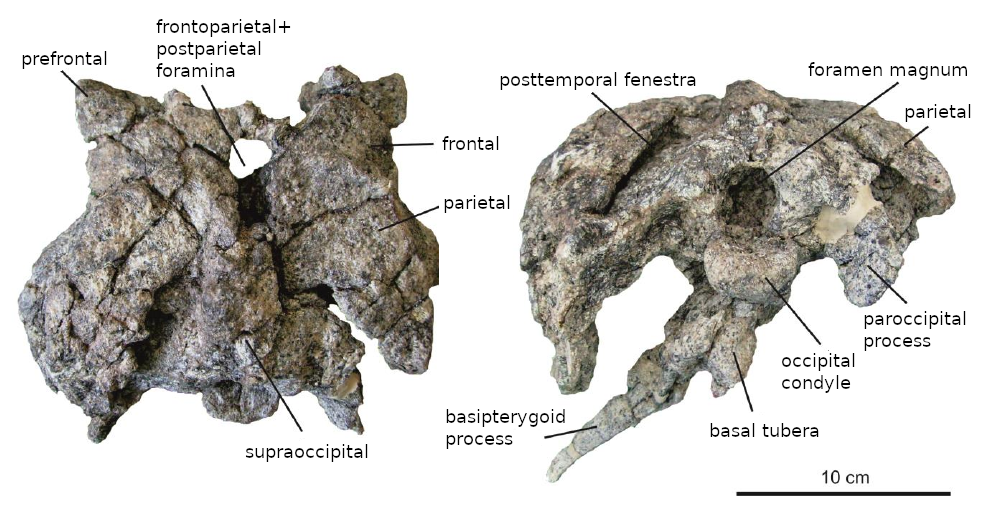
Skull roof and braincase in top (left) and rear views (right)

The braincase is mostly hidden from view by overlying bones; only the occipital region (rear part) is exposed. The uppermost bone of the occipital region is the supraoccipital, which in Bajadasaurus was completely fused to the exoccipital-opisthotic bone below and featured a distinct and narrow longitudinal ridge, the sagittal nuchal crest. The posttemporal fenestrae, a pair of openings between the parietal and the occipital region, were extended medially (towards the mid-plane of the skull), which is an autapomorphy of Bajadasaurus (a unique feature not found in closely related genera). The occipital condyle, which articulated with the first vertebra of the neck, was wider than it was high. Its rear surface was not wider than its neck, which was different from Amargasaurus and Dicraeosaurus. The basisphenoid, which formed part of the underside of the braincase, had a pair of gracile bony extensions, the basipterygoid processes, which extended forwards and downwards to articulate with the pterygoid of the palate, bracing the braincase against the latter. An autapomorphy of the genus, these processes were longer and more slender than in Dicraeosaurus and Amargasaurus, being more than six times long than wide. The left and right pterygoids, the only elements of the palate that were preserved, featured a smooth crest that received the basipterygoid processes.

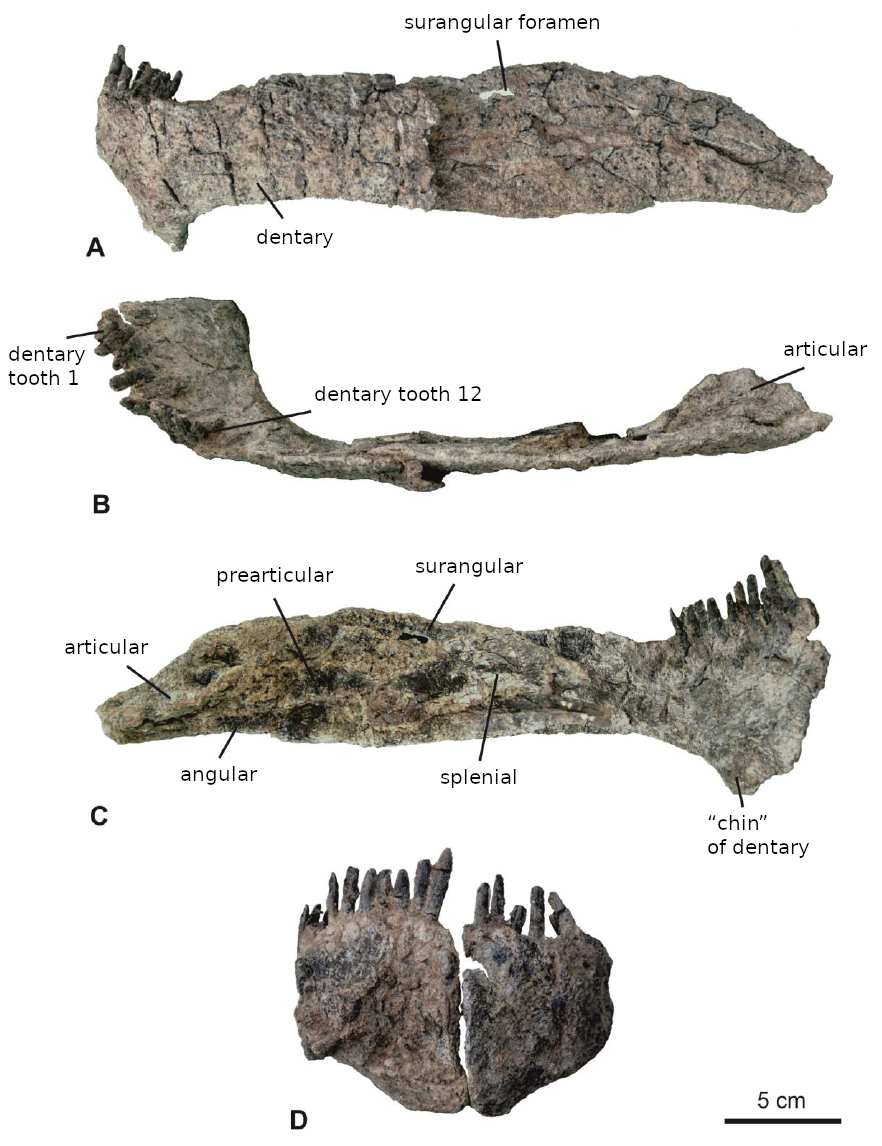
Lower jaw in side (A), top (B), inner (c), and front (D) views

The lower jaw was ca. 80% the length of the skull, which is similar to the proportions seen in diplodocids, but potentially questions previous reconstructions of other dicraeosaurids that assume a proportionally shorter lower jaw. The teeth were restricted to the front parts of the jaws, were pencil-shaped and tilted forwards; their narrow crowns were nearly straight or curved slightly inwards. Of the upper jaw, only the front section of the left maxilla (the largest bone of the upper jaw) is preserved. It preserves eight alveoli (tooth sockets), a count similar to Suuwassea, but less than in Dicraeosaurus, which had 12 teeth in each maxilla. A seemingly complete tooth row of 24 teeth was found close to, but separated from, the left maxilla. This count corresponds to the tooth count of the lower jaw, where the teeth are still anchored within the left and right dentaries (the only tooth-bearing bones of the lower jaw). Bajadasaurus thus likely had 48 teeth in total. The dentary was slender, similar to Suuwassea but unlike the deep dentary of Dicraeosaurus. In top view, the dentaries do not form the box-shaped snout seen in diplodocids, but are more rounded with a J-shaped curvature, as is typical for dicraeosaurids. The front of the dentary had a hook-like "chin" projecting downwards, as seen in other flagellicaudatans. In the hind part of the lower jaw, the angular bone was very elongated and longer than the surangular bone, unlike in diplodocids. The teeth of Bajadasaurus pronuspinax had a mean replacement time of about 40.7 days.

=== Neck vertebrae ===
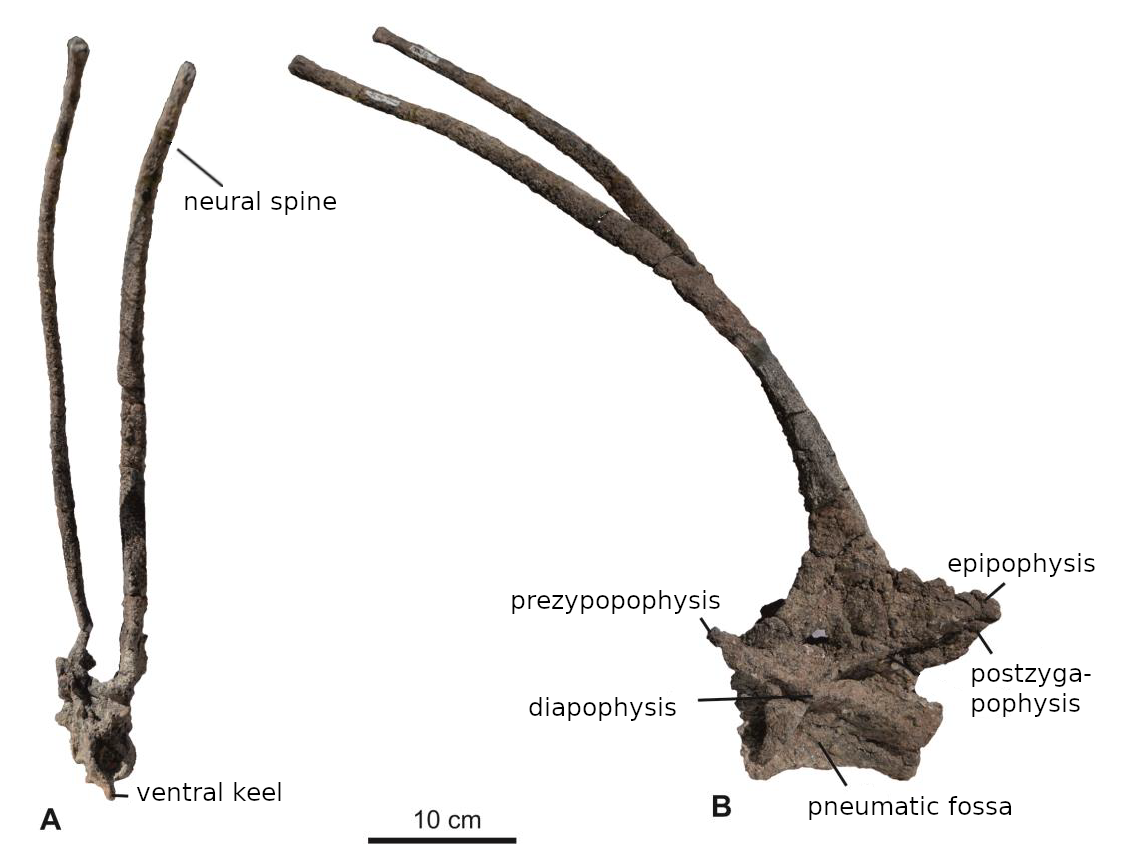
A neck vertebra, thought to be the fifth, with long neural spines

Both proatlases—small, triangular bones located between the first neck vertebra and the skull—were found in articulation with the skull. Of the first neck vertebra (the atlas), only the upper elements, the atlantal neurapophyses, are preserved. These were triangular and wing-like in Bajadasaurus. The second neck vertebra, the axis, is nearly complete. As in Dicraeosaurus, it was twice as high as it was long, while its centrum (or vertebral body) was twice as long as it was high. The diapophyses (sidewards projecting processes) were small and directed backwards as in Suuwassea rather than downwards as in Dicraeosaurus and Amargasaurus. The neural spine of the axis was narrow and not bifurcated; it differed from other sauropods in being vertically oriented (an autapomorphy of the genus), triangular in cross-section, and tapering towards its apex.

Only a single vertebra is known from the remainder of the neck. This vertebra sported the most prominent feature of the genus, an extremely elongated neural spine that was deeply bifurcated into a left and right rod-like element. This neural spine is 58 cm (1 ft 11 in) long and made the vertebra four times taller than it was long. Among sauropods, it was only comparable to those of the related Amargasaurus, but the spine curved toward the front rather than being directed backwards as in that genus. The bases of the rod-like elements were triangular and compressed sideways; their cross-section along most of their length was egg-shaped. Their tips broadened slightly, unlike the acute tips in Amargasaurus. In Amargasaurus, the spines show striations on their surface that indicate that a keratin (horn) sheath was present in life. Although similar striations cannot be observed on the spines of Bajadasaurus due to poor preservation, Gallina and colleagues found it likely that the spines were covered by a horny sheath as well. The exact position of the single preserved vertebra in the neck is unclear: its morphology is comparable to the fifth neck vertebra of Dicraeosaurus, the probable sixth of Brachytrachelopan, and the seventh of Amargasaurus; based on these comparisons, it was tentatively described as the fifth neck vertebra. The centrum of this vertebra was twice as long as it was high and narrowed into a longitudinal keel on the underside; this keel was concave and broader in other dicraeosaurids.

== Classification ==
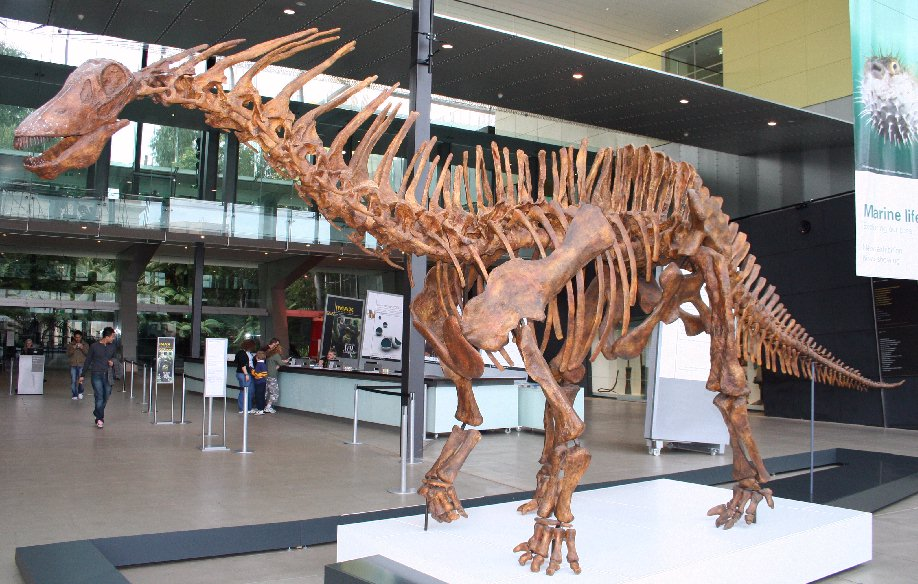
Related genus Amargasaurus, whose similarly elongated neural spines were compared to those of Bajadasaurus

Dicraeosaurids are one of the three principal families comprising the Diplodocoidea, a major subdivision of sauropod dinosaurs. Within Diplodocoidea, dicraeosaurids form the sister group of the Diplodocidae, while the third family, the Rebbachisauridae, is more distantly related. Dicraeosaurids and diplodocids are united within the group Flagellicaudata, which is named after the whip-like tails characteristic of the group. The number of genera classified within Dicraeosauridae varies between studies. Gallina and colleagues, in their 2019 description of Bajadasaurus, recognised seven additional genera. The earliest is Lingwulong from the late Early to early Middle Jurassic of China, while three genera are known from the Late Jurassic—Brachytrachelopan from Argentina; Suuwassea from the United States; and the eponymous Dicraeosaurus from Tanzania. Early Cretaceous dicraeosaurids include Bajadasaurus as well as Amargatitanis, Pilmatueia, and Amargasaurus, all from Argentina.

In their analysis of evolutionary relationships, Gallina and colleagues recovered Bajadasaurus as an intermediate member of Dicraeosauridae, more derived (more recently diverging from a common ancestor) than Suuwassea and Lingwulong, but less so than Pilmatueia, Amargasaurus, Dicraeosaurus, and Brachytrachelopan. The referral of Bajadasaurus to the Dicraeosauridae was supported by six synapomorphies (anatomical features distinguishing the group from related taxa). A subsequent analysis by John Whitlock and Jeffrey Wilson Mantilla, in 2020, found Bajadasaurus to be the most basal member of a clade that also contains Lingwulong and the unnamed North American taxon MOR 592. In this analysis, Bajadasaurus therefore occupies a slightly more basal position within Dicraeosauridae than indicated by Gallina and colleagues. As well as the genera recognised by the latter study, Whitlock and Wilson Mantilla found Kaatedocus and Smitanosaurus to be basal members of Dicraeosauridae. A 2022 study led by Guillermo Windholz analyzed multiple datasets and found conflicting results, with one of their analyses finding Bajadasaurus to be most closely related to Amargatitanis and Pilmatueia in a clade of South American dicraeosaurids. They argued that, despite the inconsistent results of their phylogenetic analyses, it would be reasonable to expect South American dicraeosaurids to group together on biogeographic grounds.

Bajadasaurus itself can be differentiated from other dicraeosaurids by a unique combination of features, which includes four autapomorphies (a medially extended posttemporal fenestra; slender and long basipterygoid processes; vertically oriented neural spines of the second neck vertebra; and elongated, forward-curved neural spines in the neck).

Cladogram by Gallina and colleagues (2019)

- Diplodocoidea
  - Rebbachisauridae
  - Flagellicaudata
    - Diplodocidae
    - Dicraeosauridae
      - - Suuwassea
        - - Lingwulong
          - - Bajadasaurus
            - - Pilmatueia
              - - Amargasaurus
                - Dicraeosaurus
                - Brachytrachelopan

Cladogram by Windholz and colleagues (2022)

- Dicraeosauridae
  - Suuwassea
  - - Lingwulong
    - - Dicraeosaurus
      - - Brachytrachelopan
        - - Amargasaurus
          - - Amargatitanis
            - Bajadasaurus
            - Pilmatueia

== Palaeobiology ==
=== Function of neural spines ===
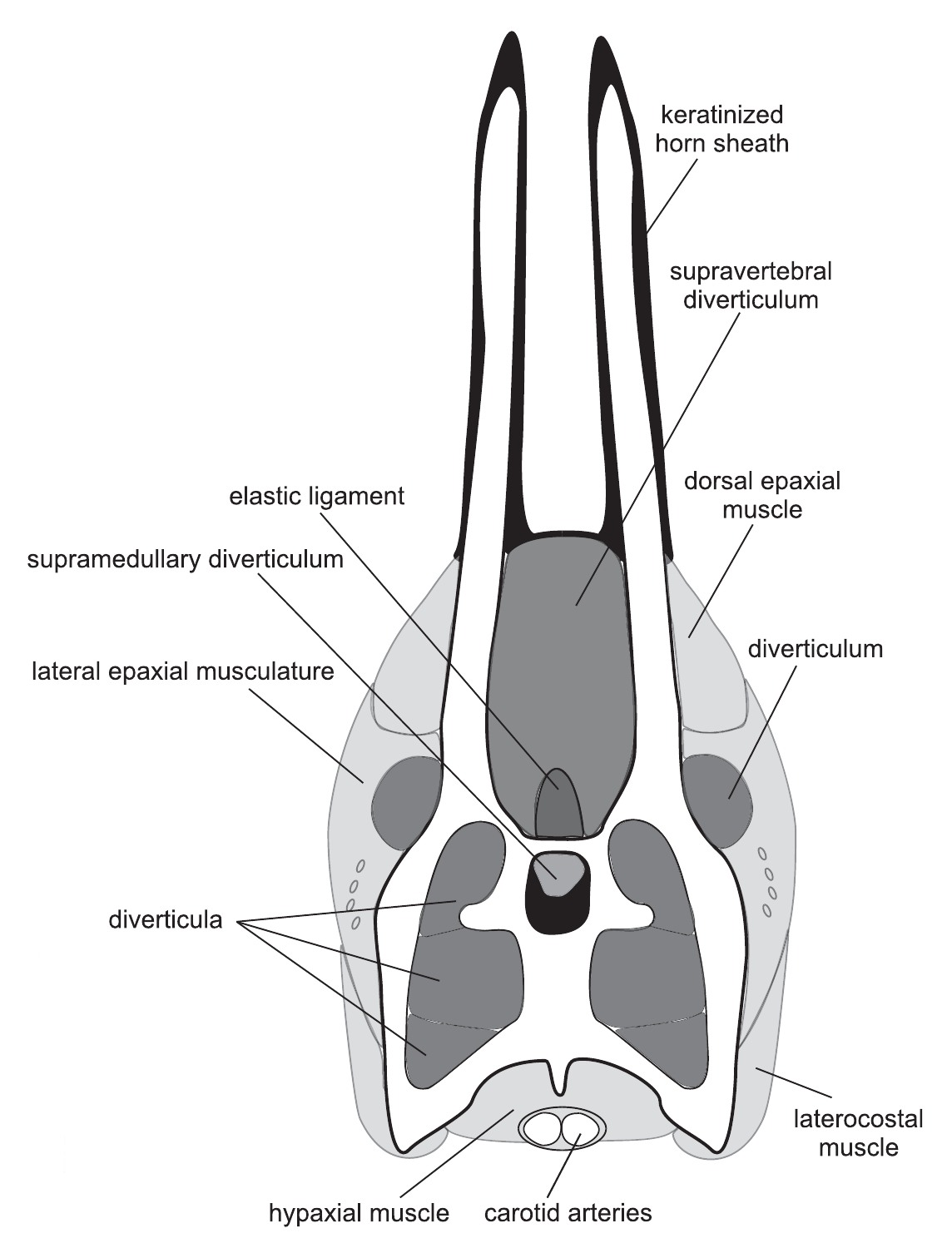
Interpretation of the soft part anatomy of a neck vertebra of the related Amargasaurus, showing the bifurcated neural spines, supravertebral diverticulum, and horny sheaths in cross section. A similar anatomy has been suggested for Bajadasaurus.

Elongated and deeply bifurcated neural spines were common in dicraeosaurids. In Dicraeosaurus and Brachytrachelopan, they were inclined toward the front but remained much shorter than in Bajadasaurus. Only the spines of Amargasaurus were similarly elongated. The spines of Amargasaurus led to much speculation about their possible life appearance and function. As hypothesised by separate authors, they could have supported a sail or horny sheaths, and could have been used for display, defense, or thermoregulation. Daniela Schwarz and colleagues, in 2007, found that the double-row formed by the bifurcated neural spines along the spine of dicraeosaurids would have enclosed an air sac, the so-called supravertebral diverticulum, that would have been connected to the lungs as part of the respiratory system. In Dicraeosaurus, this air sac would have occupied the entire space between the left and right parts of the spines, while it would have been restricted to the lower third of the spines in Amargasaurus. The upper two thirds would likely have been covered by a horny sheath, as is indicated by longitudinal striations on their surface.

Gallina and colleagues, in 2019, considered this the most reasonable interpretation that may likewise be applied to Bajadasaurus. These researchers further argued that horn is more resistant to impact-related fractures than bone, and that a horny sheath would therefore have protected the delicate spines from damage. Fracturing of the spines might have been a critical threat, as the bases of the spines roofed the spinal cord. The protection of the sheath would have been further enhanced if it would have extended past its bony core. Schwarz and colleagues reconstructed Amargasaurus with horny sheaths that did not reach far beyond their bony core, as is the case for most modern reptiles. In some modern even-toed ungulates, the horny sheath can be double the length of the horn core, and the exquisitely preserved ankylosaur Borealopelta was found with horny sheaths that extended the length of its spines by 25%, demonstrating that substantial horny extensions may occur in other dinosaurs as well. Gallina and colleagues speculated that the spines of Amargasaurus and Bajadasaurus might have been more than 50% longer than indicated by their bony core. Their bending would have further increased their resistance, as is the case in modern bighorn sheep.

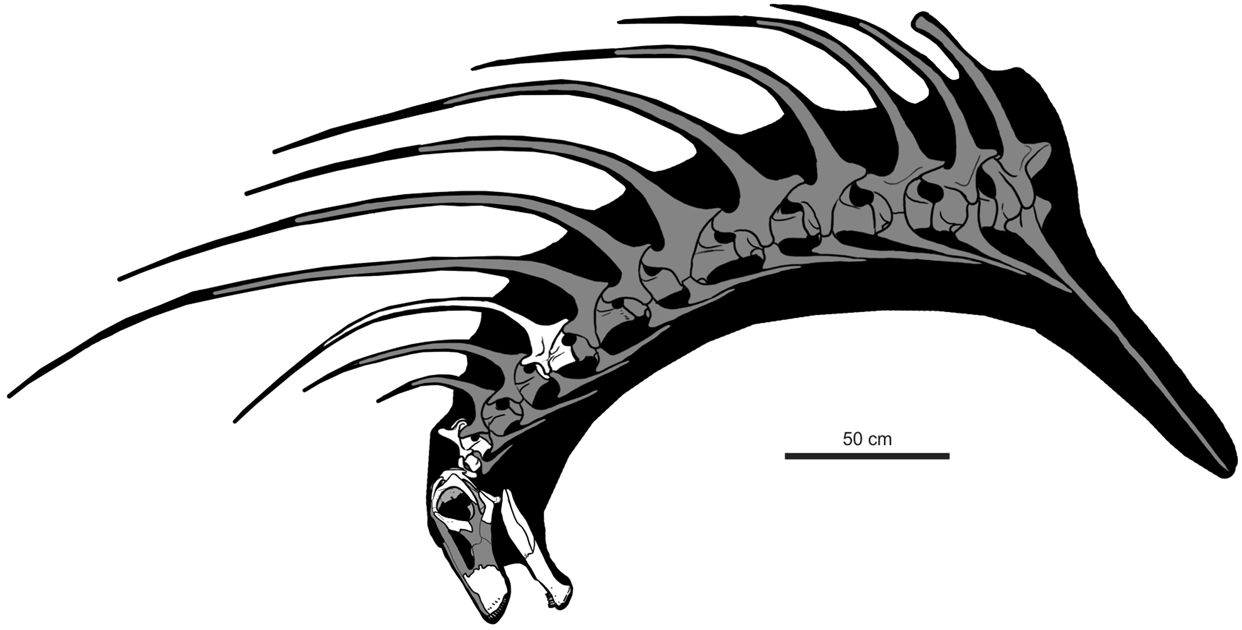
Speculative skeletal reconstruction by Gallina and colleagues, 2019, showing known elements in white. The total number of neck vertebrae and length of the spines is based on Amargasaurus.

Gallina and colleagues further speculated that the spines in both Amargasaurus and Bajadasaurus might have been used for defense. Due to its forward bend, the bifurcated neural spine of the supposed fifth neck vertebra would have reached past the head, and could therefore have been a barrier to predators. Similar, even larger spikes were postulated for the following neck vertebrae. Moderate damage would result in the break-off of the horny tips, leaving the bony spine intact. Amargasaurus lived around 15 million years later than Bajadasaurus, indicating that elongated neural spines were a long-lasting defense strategy.

In 2022, Ignacio Cerda and colleagues analysed the external and internal bone structure of the spines of Amargasaurus and an indeterminate dicraeosaurid, and suggested that the spines of these and other dicraeosaurids did not support a keratinous sheath as previously believed. Instead, the distribution and orientation of Sharpey's fibers indicates the presence of ligaments that likely extended between successive spines. The spines are also highly vascularised and bear cyclical growth marks. The authors argued that these features are consistent with the possible presence of a neck sail. Such a sail could have been used for display, possibly for sexual display or to deter rivals.

=== Senses and feeding ===
The orientation of the semicircular canals, ring-like structures in the inner ear that house the sense of balance, have been used to reconstruct habitual head postures in some dinosaurs and other extinct animals, although the reliability of this method has been repeatedly questioned. Palaeontologist Paulina Carabajal Carballido, in 2015, inferred that Amargasaurus would have had its snout facing downwards. Assuming a similar head orientation in Bajadasaurus, Gallina and colleagues hypothesised that the exposure of the eye openings in top view might have allowed the animal to look forward while feeding, while the sight of most other sauropods was limited to the sides. These researchers further speculated that this feature could have allowed for stereoscopic vision. Such stereoscopic vision would only have come into effect when the snout was downturned.

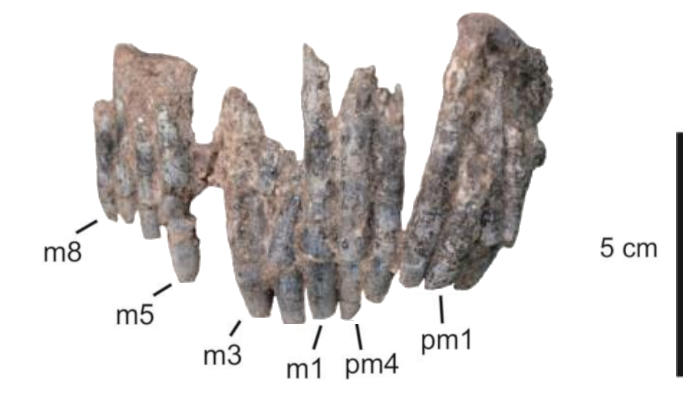
Isolated tooth row showing the premaxillary (pm1–4) and maxillary teeth (m1–8)

In 2023, Garderes and colleagues suggested that Bajadasaurus might have had a beak-like structure supporting the tooth-bearing portions of the muzzle. As beaks are made out of keratin, which rarely fossilises, their presence can only be indirectly inferred. In Bajadasaurus, such indirect evidence includes, amongst other features, a step in the side surface of the maxilla, which is often present in beaked animals. A beak could have reduced stress on the jaws during feeding and provided an additional cutting edge. However, definitive evidence for the presence of a beak-like structure is missing, and future research is needed to confirm its assumed functional advantages.

In 2025, Garderes estimated how frequently teeth were shed and replaced (tooth replacement rate) as well as the time required for teeth to form (tooth formation time) in Bajadasaurus. Such information can be derived by counting and measuring daily growth lines seen in cross-sections of teeth, and may help to reconstruct feeding habits in extinct animals where direct observation is not possible. Garderes estimated that tooth formation time varied from tooth to tooth, and that a tooth was replaced after an average of 40.7 days, with a lower number of replacement teeth than in other diplodocoids. He also suggested that Bajadasaurus was a specialist in browsing lower vegetation, based on the shape of its teeth.

In 2026, Garderes and colleagues reconstructed the musculature of the head using osteological correlates, bone features that are associated with particular muscles in modern species. The position of the inferred attachment surface for one of the head muscles, the musculus protractor pterygoidei, suggests that Bajadasaurus might possibly have used slight back-and-forth (palinal) movements of the jaws during feeding, in addition to the up-and-down (orthal) movements typically seen in sauropods. Such possible palinal movements suggest that the palate was not fully rigid but somewhat moveable (cranial kinesis). Garderes and colleagues also reconstructed the eye musculature, which is rarely documented in dinosaurs, and found it to be similar to that of birds. The reconstruction of the neck-to-skull muscles suggests that Bajadasaurus was less able to pull its head upwards (dorsiflexion) than was Camarasaurus, possibly because Bajadasaurus mainly foraged on lower vegetation while Camarasaurus foraged on higher vegetation.

== Paleoenvironment ==
Bajadasaurus was recovered from the Bajada Colorada Formation, a geological formation of the Mendoza Group that is exposed in northern Patagonia. The formation is composed of red and green-brown sandstones and conglomerates of fine to coarse grain size together with bands of reddish claystones and light brown siltstones. These sediments were mostly deposited by braided rivers, as is evident by well-preserved river channels with cross bedding. Paleosols are present in the formation. The Bajada Colorada Formation overlies the Quintuco and Picún Leufú Formations. At its top, it is separated from the overlying Agrio Formation by an unconformity (sedimentation hiatus). Bajadasaurus stems from the Bajada Colorada locality, the type locality of the formation. Besides Bajadasaurus, the locality has yielded the remains of other sauropods, including the diplodocid Leinkupal laticauda and the early titanosaur Ninjatitan zapatai, as well as those of several species of theropod that can be ascribed to basal Tetanurae and possibly to abelisauroids and deinonychosaurians.
