= Bajada Colorada Formation =

Geological formation in Argentina

- Stratigraphic range: Late Berriasian-Early Valanginian; ~140–134 Ma
- Type: Geological formation
- Unit of: Mendoza Group
- Underlies: Agrio Formation
- Overlies: Quintuco & Picún Leufú Formations

Lithology
- Primary: Sandstone, conglomerate
- Other: Siltstone, claystone

Location
- Coordinates: 39.8°S 69.7°W
- Approximate paleocoordinates: 38.8°S 32.2°W
- Region: Neuquén Province
- Country: Argentina
- Extent: Neuquén Basin

Type section
- Named by: Roll
- Year defined: 1939
- Bajada Colorada Formation (Argentina)

The Bajada Colorada Formation is a geologic formation of the southern Neuquén Province in the Neuquén Basin of northern Patagonia, Argentina. The formation belongs to the Mendoza Group and is late Berriasian to early Valanginian in age. The formation is renowned for preserving fossil remains of Bajadasaurus pronuspinax, a genus of dicraeosaurid dinosaurs named after the formation.

== Description ==
The Bajada Colorada Formation, first defined by Roll in 1939, pertains to the Mendoza Group. It overlies the Quintuco and Picún Leufú Formations and is overlain by the Agrio Formation. The contact with the Agrio Formation is discordant and the unconformity has been dated to 134 Ma. The formation is laterally equivalent with the Mulichinco Formation. The formation comprises red and greenish-brown, fine to coarse grained conglomerates and thick-bedded sandstones with well-developed bands of light brown siltstones and reddish, pinkish grey and purple-reddish claystones. The formation was deposited in a fluvial environment, and the paleoenviroment resembled a braided river system with well-preserved channels and paleosols.

X-ray diffraction studies of sediments belonging to the Bajada Colorada Formation have revealed the presence of smectite, chlorite, illite and kaolinite.

== Fossil content ==
The formation has provided fossils of:

Color key: Taxon / Reclassified taxon / Taxon falsely reported as present / Dubious taxon or junior synonym / Ichnotaxon / Ootaxon / Morphotaxon	Notes; Uncertain or tentative taxa are in small text; ~~crossed out~~ taxa are discredited.

=== Dinosaurs ===
==== Ornithischians ====
Ornithischians of the Bajada Colorada Formation
Genus	Species	Location	Stratigraphic position	Material	Notes	Images
Ankylosauria Indet.	Indeterminate			Isolated scutes		
Stegosauria Indet.	Indeterminate			Sacral vertebrae, dorsal ribs and osteoderms		

==== Sauropods ====
Sauropods of the Bajada Colorada Formation
Genus	Species	Location	Stratigraphic position	Material	Notes	Images
Bajadasaurus	B. pronuspinax			A nearly complete skull, both proatlases, atlantal neurapophyses, axis and the ?fifth cervical vertebra.	A dicraeosaurid sauropod	
Leinkupal	L. laticauda			Cervical, dorsal caudal vertebrae remains and a braincase	A diplodocine diplodocid	
Ninjatitan	N. zapatai			Partial postcranial skeleton, anterior caudal vertebra of the holotype might represent diplodocoid sauropod.	A titanosaurian sauropod	

==== Theropods ====
Theropods of the Bajada Colorada Formation
Genus	Species	Location	Stratigraphic position	Material	Notes	Images
Abelisauridae Indet.	Indeterminate			Proximal half of a left tibia		
Abelisauroidea Indet.	Indeterminate			Am almost complete axis (MMCh-PV 67) and two isolated caudal centra (MMCh-PV 76 and 77)		
Megalosauridae Indet.	Indeterminate			Dental remains		
Theropoda Indet.	Indeterminate			Dental remains	3 different morphotypes are present.	

== See also ==
- List of dinosaur-bearing rock formations
- Baños del Flaco Formation, contemporaneous formation of the Mendoza Group in Chile
- Chon Aike Formation, contemporaneous formation of central Patagonia
