= Ninjatitan =

Ninjatitan Temporal range: Early Cretaceous, 140–134 Ma

Scientific classification
- Kingdom: Animalia
- Phylum: Chordata
- Class: Reptilia
- Clade: Dinosauria
- Clade: Saurischia
- Clade: †Sauropodomorpha
- Clade: †Sauropoda
- Clade: †Macronaria
- Clade: †Titanosauria
- Genus: †Ninjatitan; Gallina, Canale, & Carballido, 2021
- Species: †N. zapatai

Binomial name
- †Ninjatitan zapatai Gallina, Canale, & Carballido, 2021

Genus of sauropod dinosaurs

Ninjatitan (meaning "Ninja giant") is an extinct genus of titanosaurian sauropod dinosaur from the Early Cretaceous (Berriasian–Valanginian age) Bajada Colorada Formation of Argentina. The genus contains a single species, Ninjatitan zapatai, which was named and described in 2021 based on a partial postcranial skeleton discovered in 2014. Its generic name comes from a nickname of Argentine palaeontologist Sebastian Apesteguia, and the specific name comes from technician Rogelio Zapata.

When it was named in 2021, Ninjatitan was identified as the oldest titanosaur known, although subsequent research has cast doubt on this interpretation, as the Russian Tengrisaurus is comparable in age and more conclusively titanosaurian.

Ninjatitan may be a chimera. The anterior caudal vertebra of the holotype bears large lateral pneumatic openings more reminiscent of rebbachisaurids and diplodocines than somphospondylans, and the vertebra bears a deeply excavated prezygapophyseal centrodiapophyseal fossa, a feature only known in diplodocoids. However, the dorsal vertebra of the holotype has camellate skeletal pneumaticity, as in titanosauriforms but not diplodocoids, and the scapula bears a triangular projection not found in any diplodocoid but commonly seen in titanosauriforms. The holotype of Ninjatitan was found at the same locality, but a slightly deeper rock layer, as the holotype of the diplodocoids Leinkupal and Bajadasaurus.

== Classification ==
Ninjatitan does not preserve any unanimous features that classify it as a somphospondylan, but it does bear features that suggest it can be included within the clade Titanosauria, either as a basal taxon or possibly within the clade Colossosauria. The phylogenetic results of Gallina and colleagues are shown below, where Ninjatitan was suggested to have multiple possible positions.

- Titanosauria
  - Andesaurus
  - - Ninjatitan
    - - Epachthosaurus
      - - - Dreadnoughtus
          - Lithostrotia
        - Colossosauria
          - Rinconsauria
          - - Bonitasaura
            - - Notocolossus
              - Lognkosauria
                - Mendozasaurus
                - - Ninjatitan
                  - - - Ninjatitan
                      - - Quetecsaurus
                        - Futalognkosaurus
                    - - Ninjatitan
                      - - Drusilasaura
                        - Puertasaurus
                        - - Ninjatitan
                          - - Argentinosaurus
                            - Patagotitan

In 2025, Averianov and colleagues reassessed the phylogenetic relationships of Tengrisaurus and other early titanosaurs and allied taxa. They noted that the anterior caudal vertebrae of Ninjatitan have a large pleurocoels, uncharacteristic of titanosaurs but similar to Triunfosaurus, a non-titanosaurian somphospondylan from similarly-aged rock layers in Brazil. As such, the researchers concluded Ninjatitan could not conclusively be assigned to the Titanosauria, and that it should likely be classified outside of this clade.
