= La Amarga Formation =

Rock formation in Argentina

- Stratigraphic range: Barremian-Early Aptian; ~130–120 Ma
- Type: Geological formation
- Unit of: Rayoso Group
- Sub-units: Puesto Antigual, Bañados de Caichigüe & Piedra Parada Members
- Underlies: Lohan Cura Formation
- Overlies: Agrio Formation
- Thickness: 160 m (520 ft)

Lithology
- Primary: Sandstone
- Other: Mudstone

Location
- Coordinates: 39.6°S 70.2°W
- Approximate paleocoordinates: 39.6°S 35.2°W
- Region: Río Negro, Mendoza & Neuquén Provinces
- Country: Argentina
- Extent: Neuquén Basin

Type section
- Named for: La Amarga Arroyo
- Named by: Musacchio
- Year defined: 1970
- La Amarga Formation (Argentina)

The La Amarga Formation is a geologic formation with outcrops in the Argentine provinces of Río Negro, Neuquén, and Mendoza. It is the oldest Cretaceous terrestrial formation in the Neuquén Basin.

The type locality is La Amarga Arroyo and China Muerta Hill. The La Amarga Formation unconformably overlies the marine Agrio Formation of the Mendoza Group. It is in turn overlain by the Lohan Cura Formation, separated by another unconformity.

== Composition ==
There are three members within the La Amarga Formation.

1. The oldest is the Puesto Antigual Member, which is approximately 28.9 metres (95 ft) thick and consists mainly of sandstone deposited in the channels of a braided river system. Paleosols, or soil deposits, are well-developed.
2. The Bañados de Caichigüe Member is the next highest, approximately 20.9 metres (69 ft) thick. Alternating limestones, shales, and siltstones make up this member, indicating a lacustrine (lake) environment.
3. Youngest and thickest is the Piedra Parada Member, approximately 109.4 metres (359 ft) thick in some sections. This member consists of alternating sandstones and siltstones from an ancient alluvial plain, with some swamp and paleosol deposits.

== Fossil content ==
Most of the tetrapod fossils found in the La Amarga come from the Puesto Antigual Member.

=== Dinosaurs ===
Dinosaurs
Genus	Species	Location	Stratigraphic position	Material	Images
Amargasaurus	A. cazaui	Neuquén	Puesto Antigual	"Braincase and associated postcranial skeleton."	
Amargatitanis	A. macni	Neuquén	Puesto Antigual	"Two caudal vertebrae, an incomplete right ischium, a right femur, an incomplete right tibia, an incomplete right fibula, a right astragalus, and an incomplete right metatarsal I."	
Ligabueino	L. andesi	Neuquén	Puesto Antigual	"A cervical neural arch, a mid to posterior dorsal neural arch, a posterior dorsal centrum, the left femur, left ilium, articulated pubic shafts, and two pedal phalanges."	
Zapalasaurus	Z. bonapartei	Neuquén	Piedra Parada		
Stegosauria indet.	Indeterminate	Neuquén	Puesto Antigual	"Supraorbital, cervical and caudal vertebrae, dermal armor".	

=== Other tetrapods ===
Other tetrapods
Genus	Species	Location	Stratigraphic position	Material	Images
Amargasuchus	A. minor	Neuquén	Puesto Antigual	A trematochampsid crocodylomorph, found in association with the holotype of Amargasaurus	
Pterosauria indet.	Indeterminate	Neuquén		An isolated femur	
Vincelestes	V. neuquenianus	Neuquén	Puesto Antigual	A cladotherian mammal	

Color key: Taxon / Reclassified taxon / Taxon falsely reported as present / Dubious taxon or junior synonym / Ichnotaxon / Ootaxon / Morphotaxon	Notes; Uncertain or tentative taxa are in small text; ~~crossed out~~ taxa are discredited.

== See also ==
- List of dinosaur-bearing rock formations
