= Leinkupal =

Leinkupal Temporal range: Early Valanginian ~136.4 Ma
- Holotype caudal vertebra in anterior and lateral views

Scientific classification
- Kingdom: Animalia
- Phylum: Chordata
- Class: Reptilia
- Clade: Dinosauria
- Clade: Saurischia
- Clade: †Sauropodomorpha
- Clade: †Sauropoda
- Clade: †Eusauropoda
- Superfamily: †Diplodocoidea
- Family: †Diplodocidae
- Subfamily: †Diplodocinae
- Genus: †Leinkupal; Gallina et al., 2014

Type species
- †Leinkupal laticauda Gallina et al., 2014

Synonyms
- Leikupal Gallina et al., 2014 (lapsus calami)

Extinct genus of reptiles

Leinkupal is a genus of diplodocine sauropod known from the Early Cretaceous (Late Berriasian to Early Valanginian stage) of the Bajada Colorada Formation, southeastern Neuquén Basin in the Neuquén Province of Argentina. It contains a single species, Leinkupal laticauda.

== History of discovery ==
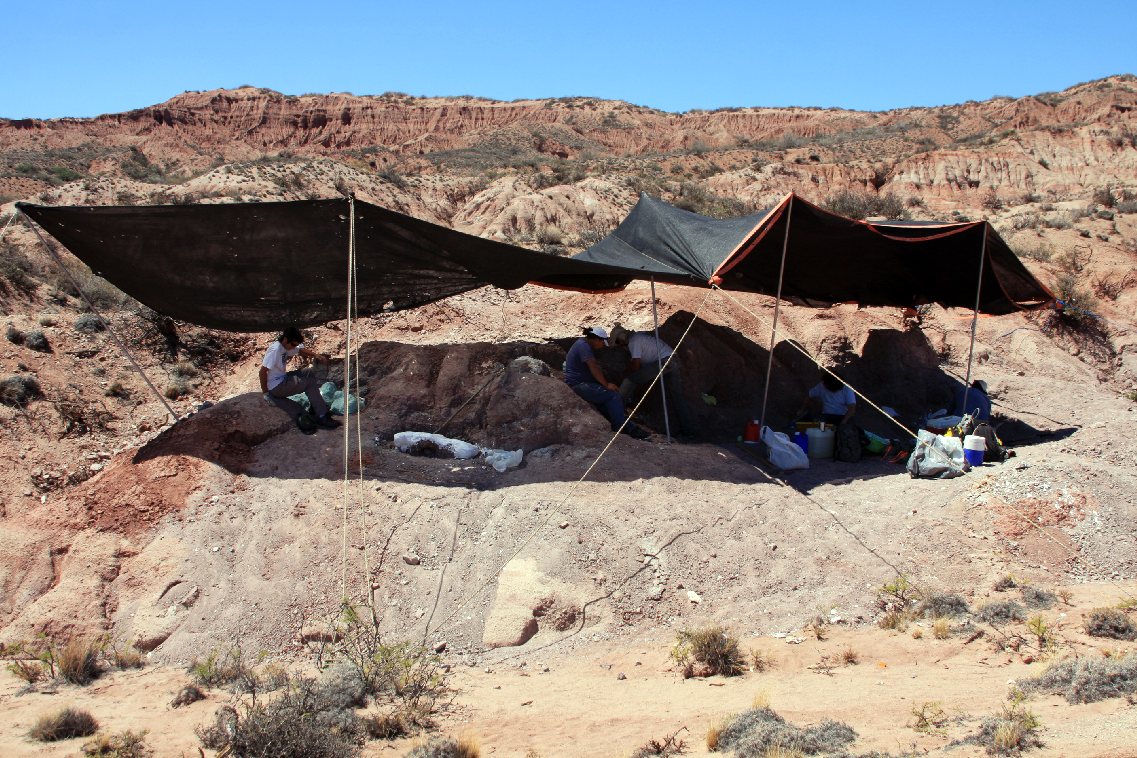
Excavation of the holotype

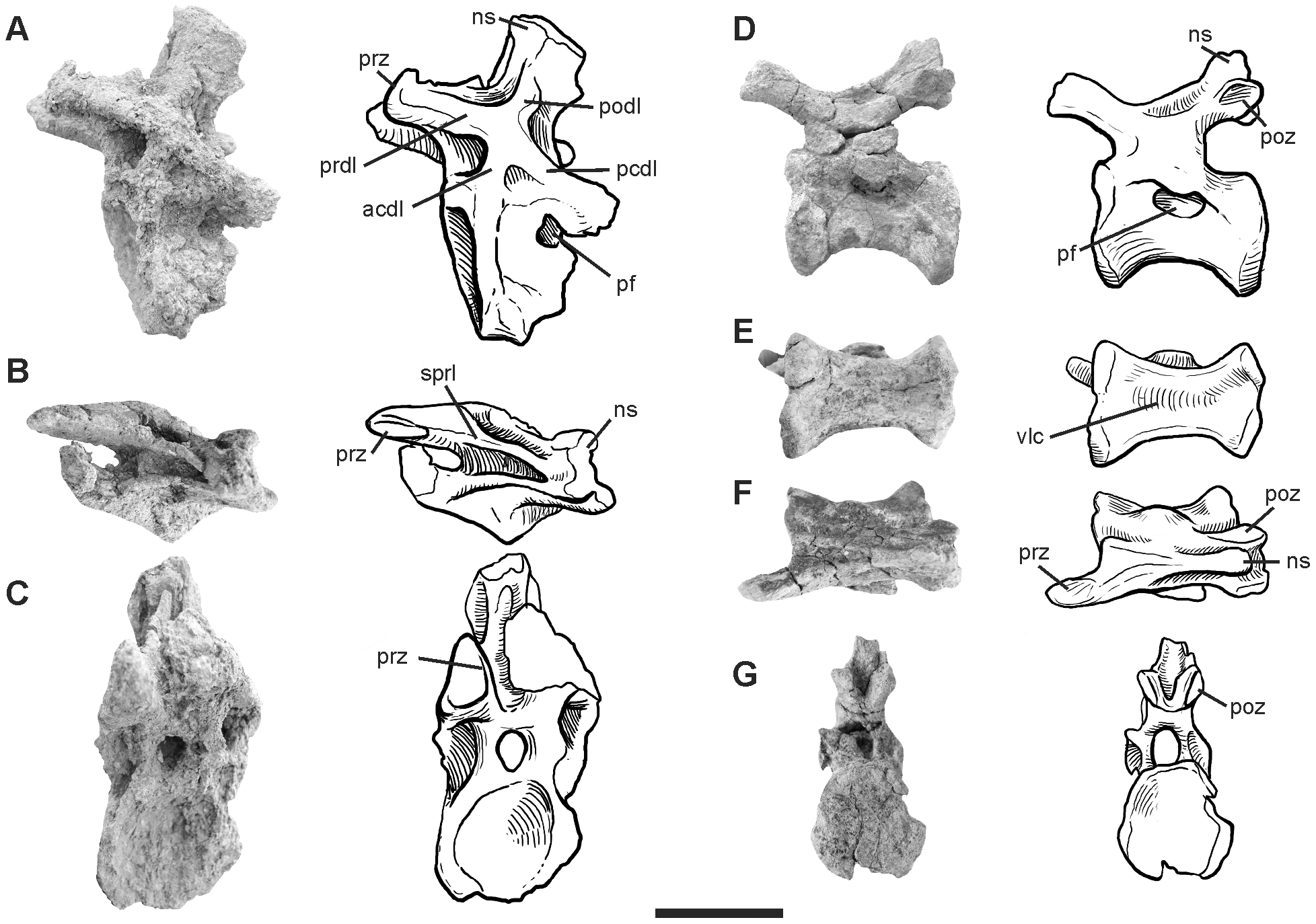
Mid caudal vertebrae possibly referable to Leinkupal

In 2010 and 2012, at Picún Leufu in Neuquén Province, remains were uncovered of several types of dinosaurs. One of these was a diplodocoid sauropod new to science.

In 2014, the type species Leinkupal laticauda was named and described by Pablo Gallina, Sebastián Apesteguía, Alejandro Haluza and Juan Canale. The generic name combines the Mapudungun lein, "vanishing", and kupal, "family", in reference to Leinkupal being the last, or youngest, known species of the Diplodocidae. The specific name is derived from Latin, latus, "wide", and cauda, "tail", in reference to the broad caudal vertebrae.

The holotype, MMCH-Pv 63-1, was found in a layer of the Bajada Colorada Formation dating from the Berriasian–Valanginian. It consists of a front tail vertebra. As paratypes were assigned: MMCH-Pv 63-2/3: two front tail vertebrae; MMCH-Pv 63-4: a hind tail vertebra, MMCH-Pv 63-5: a front dorsal vertebra, MMCH-Pv 63-6: a front tail vertebra; and MMCH-Pv 63-7/8: two vertebrae of the middle tail. Additional possible material has been discovered but was not referred as its identity was uncertain. Due to the lack of overlapping material with the holotype, the other bones from the site were later considered to be indeterminate diplodocid specimens.

In 2022, a specimen of a diplodocid braincase, MMCh-Pv-232, was reported from the type locality and tentatively assigned to L. laticauda, though as with all specimens from the locality other than the holotype this referral was later questioned.

== Description ==
Leinkupal was a relatively small sauropod, with an estimated body length of 9 metres (30 ft). Several unique derived traits, or autapomorphies, could be established. The front tail vertebrae have extremely well-developed transverse processes, as long as the width of the vertebral body, expanded sideways and to below, and possessing robust reinforcing ridges on their top and bottom surfaces. The front tail vertebrae have very robust ridges running between the vertebral body and the front joint processes, the prezygapophyses. The front tail vertebrae have rear joint processes, postzygapophyses, with two paired pneumatic openings at their inner bases, opposite from the joint facets.

== Classification ==
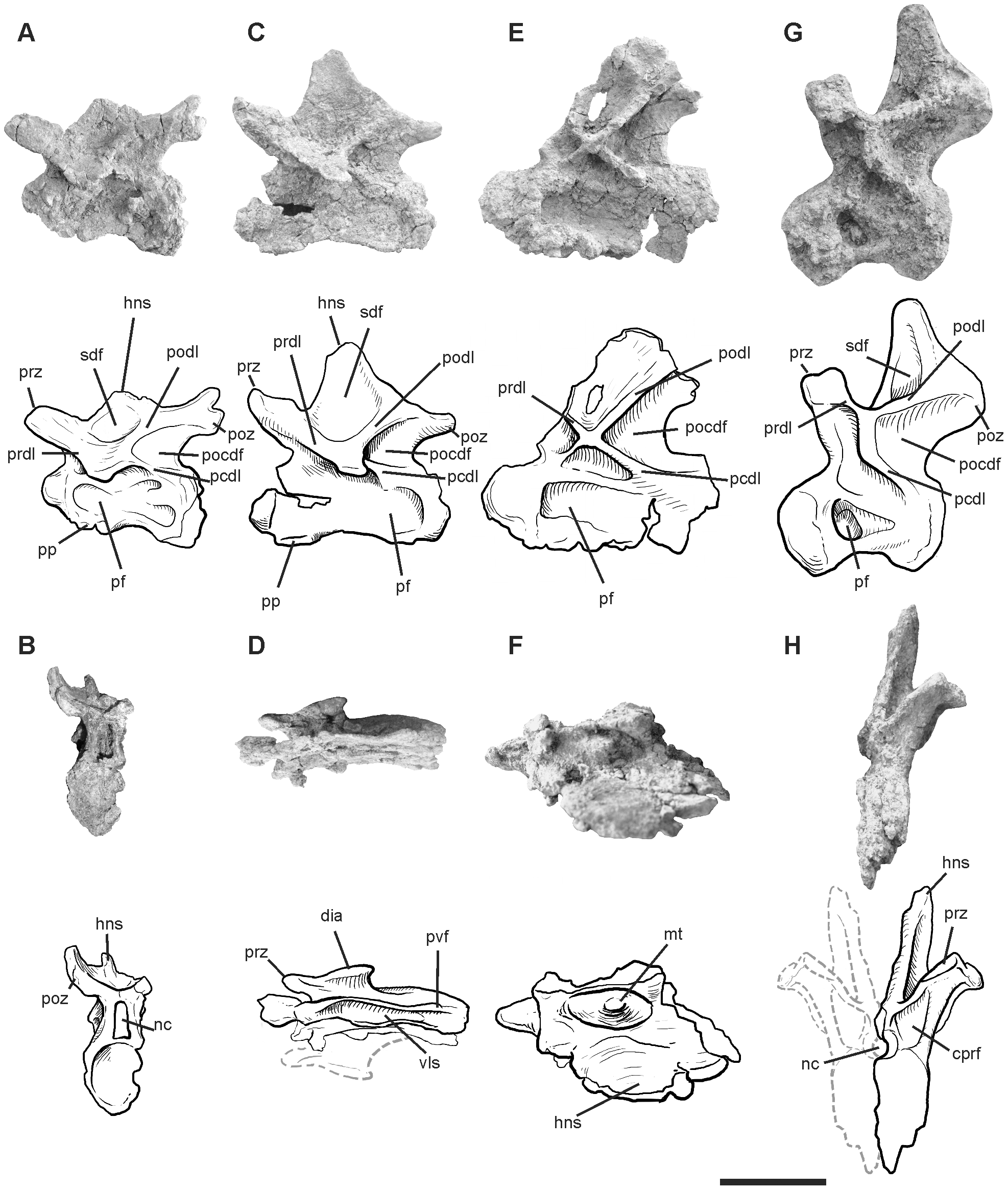
Cervical and dorsal vertebrae possibly referable to Leinkupal

Leinkupal was placed in the Diplodocinae within the Diplodocidae. A cladistic analysis indicated it was a possible sister species of Tornieria, discovered in Africa. As the latter genus lived much earlier, during the Late Jurassic, this would imply that the Diplodocoidea had an early origin, no later than the Middle Jurassic. The affinity between Leinkupal and Tornieria could be explained by either an early radiation of diplodocines or a later colonising of South-America from Africa. Leinkupal is the only known unequivocal diplodocid from South-America and the youngest unequivocal diplodocid globally, the only known from the Cretaceous.

Cladogram of the Diplodocidae after Tschopp, Mateus, and Benson (2015).

- Diplodocidae
  - Amphicoelias altus
  - - Apatosaurinae
      - Unnamed species
      - - - Apatosaurus ajax
          - Apatosaurus louisae
        - - Brontosaurus excelsus
          - - Brontosaurus yahnahpin
            - Brontosaurus parvus
    - Diplodocinae
      - Unnamed species
      - - Tornieria africana
        - - - Supersaurus lourinhanensis
            - Supersaurus vivianae
          - - Leinkupal laticauda
            - - Galeamopus hayi
              - - - Diplodocus carnegii
                  - Diplodocus hallorum
                - - Kaatedocus siberi
                  - Barosaurus lentus

== Palaeoenvironment ==
Leinkupal was discovered in the Bajada Colorada Formation. This formation is composed of red and greenish brown sandstones and conglomerates of fine to coarse grain, in addition to prominent bands of tan siltstones and reddish claystones. These deposits represent a fluvial environment with braided rivers. Paleosols and channels with cross-stratification are present. Leinkupal shared its habitat with several theropods including basal tetanurans, possible deinonychosaurians, and possible abelisauroids, in addition to the dicraeosaurid sauropod Bajadasaurus and the early titanosaur Ninjatitan.
