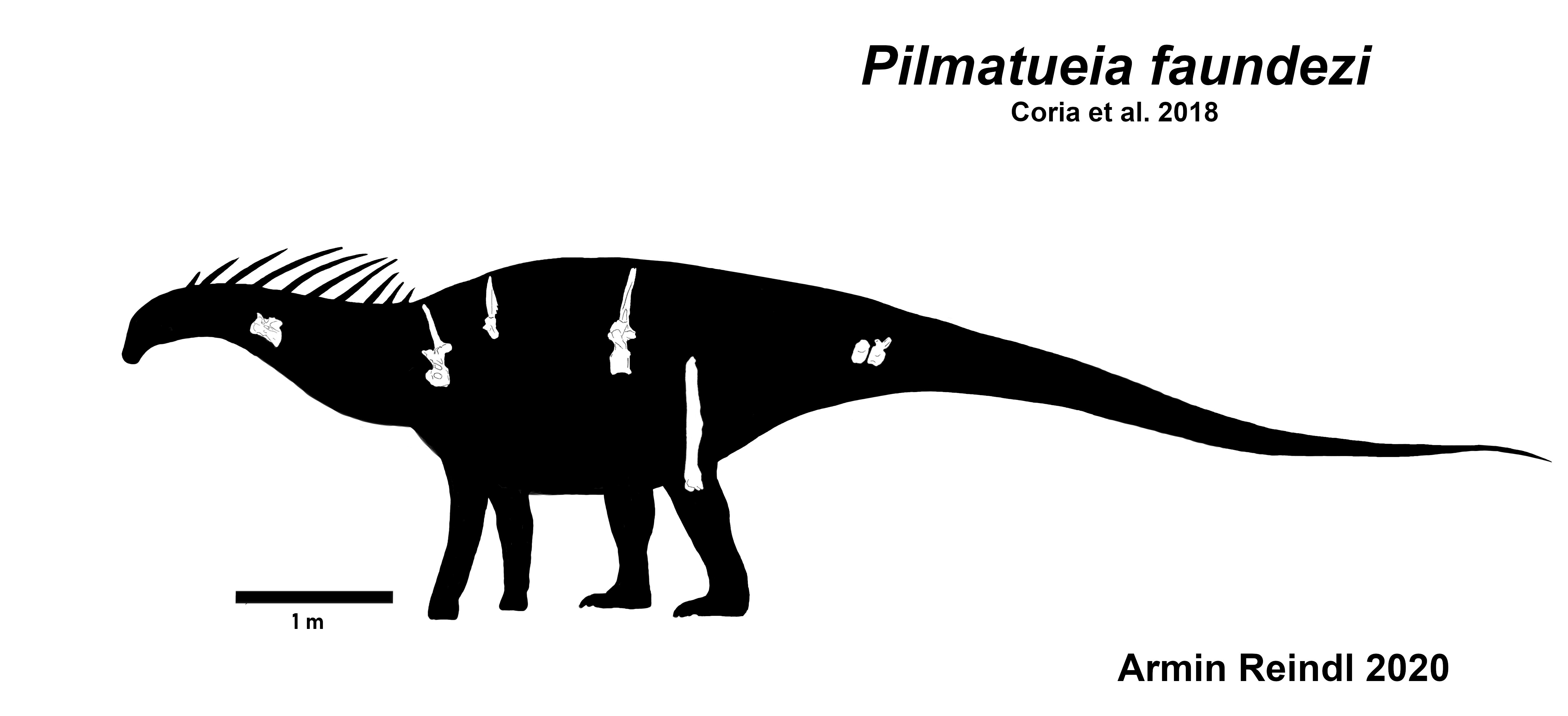
- Skeletal reconstruction

Scientific classification
- Kingdom: Animalia
- Phylum: Chordata
- Class: Reptilia
- Clade: Dinosauria
- Clade: Saurischia
- Clade: †Sauropodomorpha
- Clade: †Sauropoda
- Clade: †Eusauropoda
- Superfamily: †Diplodocoidea
- Family: †Dicraeosauridae
- Genus: †Pilmatueia; Coria et al., 2019

Type species
- †Pilmatueia faundezi Coria et al., 2019

= Pilmatueia =

Pilmatueia Temporal range: Early Cretaceous, Valanginian

Sauropod dinosaur genus from the early Cretaceous Period

Pilmatueia is a genus of diplodocoid sauropods belonging to the family Dicraeosauridae that lived during the Early Cretaceous in what is now Argentina. Its type and only species is Pilmatueia faundezi. Pilmatueia was probably closely related to other South American dicraeosaurids such as Amargasaurus. Like other dicraeosaurids, Pilmatueia was relatively small for a sauropod. The vertebrae of Pilmatueia were more extensively hollowed out by air sacs than in other dicraeosaurids, which otherwise were characterized by a reduction in the air sac system compared to other sauropods. Pilmatueia dates to the Valanginian, an age of the Cretaceous period for which dinosaur faunas are poorly known.

== Discovery and naming ==
Fossils of Pilmatueia faundezi were discovered in Neuquén Province, Argentina, at a site called Pilmatué. Fossil excavations at Pilmatué began in 2009, and the discovery of dicraeosaurid remains at Pilmatué was first announced in 2012, at a paleontology conference in Buenos Aires. In 2019, (Note: The article was released online on 29 August 2018, but formally published in the January 2019 issue of the journal.) Rodolfo Coria and colleagues named the new genus and species Pilmatueia faundezi. The genus name refers to the Pilmatué locality, and the species epithet recognizes Ramón Faúndez, manager of the Museo Municipal de Las Lajas, who supported the excavation project. The discovery of Pilmatueia in the Valanginian, an age of the Early Cretaceous with poorly known dinosaur faunas, helped fill a gap in the dicraeosaurid fossil record between Jurassic dicraeosaurids and the later Amargasaurus.

== Fossil specimens ==
Pilmatueia faundezi fossils have been found in the Mulichinco Formation of Argentina. Known material includes the holotype, MLL Pv-005, a posterior dorsal vertebra; the paratype MLL-Pv-002, a posterior cervical vertebra; MLL-Pv-010, a partial skeleton including cervical vertebrae, dorsal vertebrae, ribs, a caudal vertebra, and incomplete scapulae; and other isolated vertebrae. Other dicraeosaurid fossils have been found in the Mulichinco Formation, including a femur and a natural cranial endocast, and it is possible that they also belong to Pilmatueia faundezi.

== Description ==
Pilmatueia was a relatively small sauropod, perhaps less than 12 meters long. Like other dicraeosaurids, it had tall, deeply forked neural spines on its cervical and dorsal vertebrae. The cervical neural spines were low compared to those of Amargasaurus and Bajadasaurus. As in most dicraeosaurids, the neural spines were inclined forward, unlike the backswept neural spines seen in Amargasaurus. Unlike most dicraeosaurids, which have reduced vertebral pneumaticity compared to other sauropods, the cervical vertebrae of Pilmatueia contain pneumatic chambers. However, as in other dicraeosaurids, the dorsal centra lack the pneumatic foramina that are characteristic of most sauropods. The cervical centra have ventral keels that are forked anteriorly and posteriorly, unlike the simple midline keels typical of other diplodocoids. A foramen is present on the proximal end of the cervical ribs, which probably is a nutrient foramen and not a pneumatic structure. The anterior dorsal vertebrae show an autapomorphic ridge on the anterior centrodiapophyseal lamina. Even the posterior dorsal vertebrae had forked neural spines, as in its close relative Amargasaurus, and unlike other dicraeosaurids in which forking of the neural spines only extended into the middle dorsal vertebrae. The posterior dorsal vertebrae show an autapomorphic pair of deep fossae near the bases of the neural spines. The scapula has a ridge on the medial surface near the acromion, which is not present in other dicraeosaurids.

== Classification ==
- Dicraeosauridae
  - Suuwassea
  - - Lingwulong
    - - Dicraeosaurus
      - - Brachytrachelopan
        - - Amargasaurus
          - - Amargatitanis
            - Bajadasaurus
            - Pilmatueia

Phylogenetic position of Pilmatueia within Dicraeosauridae, following an analysis by Windholtz et al. that recovered their favored hypothesis of South American dicraeosaurid monophyly, with South American dicraeosaurids highlighted in red.

Pilmatueia is a dicraeosaurid sauropod. Its phylogenetic position within Dicraeosauridae is uncertain, with some analyses finding it to be closely related to Amargasaurus and other analyses finding it to be a more basal dicraeosaurid, outside the clade uniting Dicraeosaurus, Brachytrachelopan, and Amargasaurus. Windholz et al. argued that, while phylogenetic analyses do not currently provide clear resolution for its affinities, on chronological and biogeographic grounds it is most likely to belong to a clade uniting the South American dicraeosaurids.

== Paleoecology ==
Pilmatueia lived in what is now Argentina during the Valanginian age of the Cretaceous, and is a member of the Bajadan faunal assemblage. It coexisted with an indeterminate species of diplodocid and the small, early carcharodontosaur Lajasvenator. Podocarp trees were present in the ecosystem.
