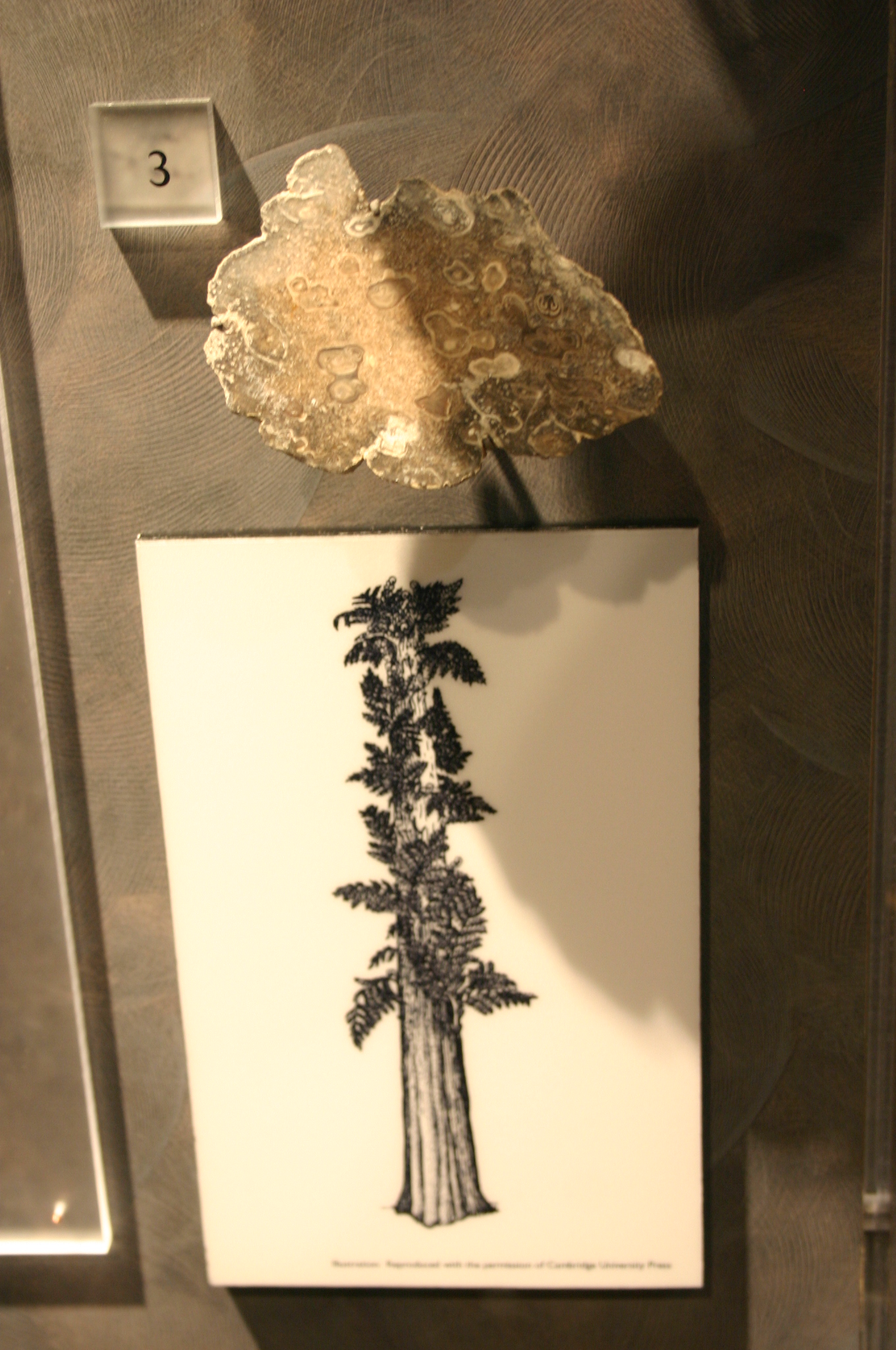
- Tempskya fossil slab and reconstruction on display

Scientific classification
- Kingdom: Plantae
- Clade: Tracheophytes
- Division: Polypodiophyta
- Class: Polypodiopsida
- Subclass: Polypodiidae
- Order: incertae sedis
- Family: †Tempskyaceae; Read et Brown ex L.C.A. Martínez
- Genus: †Tempskya; Corda 1845

= Tempskya =

Tempskya Temporal range: Cretaceous Valanginian–Santonian

Extinct genus of ferns

Tempskya is an extinct genus of tree fern that lived during the Cretaceous period. Fossils have been found across both the Northern and Southern hemispheres. The growth habit of Tempskya was unlike that of any living fern or any other living plant, consisting of multiple conjoined dichotomous branching stems enmeshed within roots that formed a "false trunk".

== Description ==
The trunk of Tempskya was actually a large collection of stems surrounded by adventitious roots. The false trunks can reach up to 6 metres (20 ft) in height and up to 50 centimetres (20 in) in diameter. Small leaves grew from various points across the height of the trunk. This is in contrast to most tree ferns, where typically large leaves grow from the top of the trunk. Thin leaves have been discovered for the first time on Tempskya wyomingense specimens; the more commonly seen fossilized leaf bases show that they covered the upper part of the trunk.

=== Hypothesized growth pattern ===
Examination of cross sections of various Tempskya specimens shows that those with the largest trunks have the smallest number of stems, and vice versa. From this, a possible growth pattern of Tempskya has been suggested: at the sporeling stage, Tempskya would consist of a single stem, which would begin to branch off distally. A "mantle" of adventitious roots would then develop around the stems to support them. Later on, many of the stems would begin to decay, while the adventitious roots would still provide support and absorb water for the grown plant. This growth pattern has also been hypothesized for Psaronius.

=== Ecology ===
Tempskya is thought to have grown in lowland environments close to water, like wetlands and riverbanks.

== Taxonomy ==
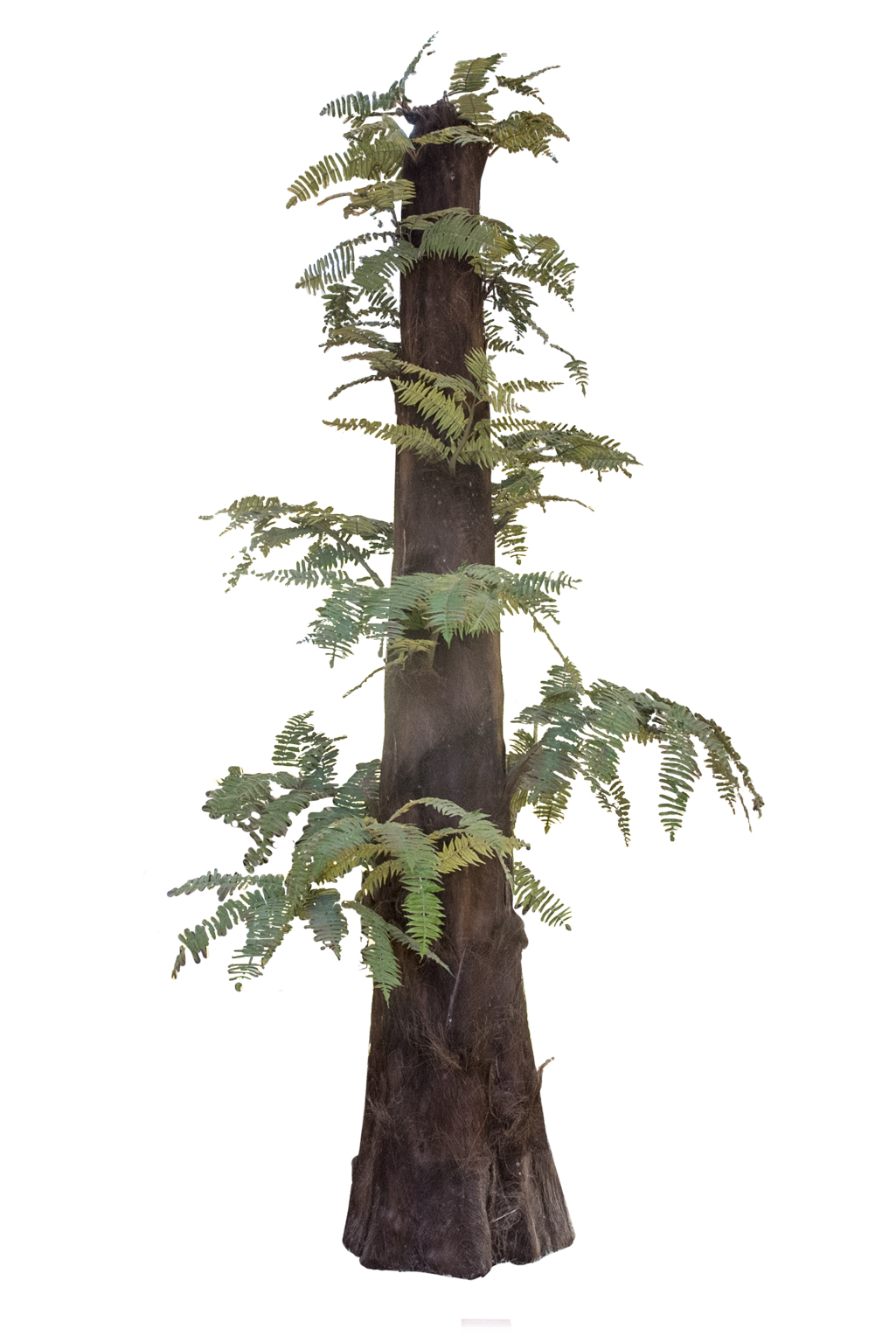
Tempskya sp. - Reconstruction at MUSE - Science Museum in Trento

The first fossils of Tempskya was originally described in 1824 as the Endogenites erosa by Stokes and Webb, who considered it to be a palm tree. The genus Tempskya was named by August Carl Joseph Corda in 1845, from specimens found in what is now the Czech Republic. The four species originally described by Corda were, in order: Tempskya pulchra, Tempskya macrocaula, Tempskya microrrhiza, and Tempskya schimperi.

Tempskya is the sole member of the family Tempskyaceae. The family has been placed in the order "Filicales", which is now split into a number of orders of leptosporangiate ferns. They have been suggested to members of Cyatheales, based on morphological similarities of the petiole and spores to some members of that order.

=== Species ===
Most taxonomists divide Tempskya species into two groups, those with a simple cortex with only a parenchymatous inner cortex without sclerenchyma, while other species have an inner cortex with either discontinuous or continuous layers of sclerenchyma.

- Parenchymatous inner cortex group:
  - Tempskya iwatensis Nishida, 1986 Taneichi Formation, Japan, Late Cretaceous (Santonian)
  - Tempskya rossica Kidston and Gwynne Vaughan, 1911 Mugadjar, Kazakhstan, Upper Cretaceous?
  - Tempskya uemurae Nishida, 2001 Taneichi Formation, Japan, Late Cretaceous (Santonian)
  - Tempskya dernbachii Tidwell et Wright, 2003 emend. Martínez, Martínez and Olivo, 2015 Mulichinco Formation, Argentina, Early Cretaceous (Valanginian)
  - Tempskya zellerii Ash et Read, Ash and Read, 1976 Mojado Formation, New Mexico, United States, Early Cretaceous (Albian)
  - Tempskya minor Read and Brown, 1937 Bear River Formation, Wyoming, United States, Late Cretaceous
  - Tempskya jonesii Tidwell and Hebbert, 1992 Cedar Mountain Formation, Burro Canyon Formation, Dakota Formation, Utah, United States, Cretaceous (Albian-Cenomanian)
  - Tempskya knowltonii Seward, 1924 Montana and Utah (possibly Kootenai Formation) United States, Early Cretaceous
- Continuous bands of sclerenchyma in the inner cortex group:
  - Tempskya grandis Read and Brown 1937 Bear River Formation, Wyoming, United States, Late Cretaceous
  - Tempskya superba Arnold, 1958 Dawes County, Nebraska (possibly Lakota Formation) United States, Early Cretaceous?
  - Tempskya reesidei Ash and Read, 1976 Mojado Formation, New Mexico, United States, Early Cretaceous (Albian)
  - Tempskya readii Tidwell and Hebbert 1992 Burro Canyon Formation, Utah, United States, mid Cretaceous
  - Tempskya riojana Barale and Viera, 1989 Enciso Group, Spain, Early Cretaceous (Valanginian to Barremian)
  - Tempskya wesselii Arnold, 1945 Kootenai Formation, Montana, Oregon and Utah, United States, Early Cretaceous
  - Tempskya judithae Clifford and Dettmann, 2005 Winton Formation, Australia, Early Cretaceous (Albian)
  - Tempskya stichkae Tidwell and Hebbert, 1992 Cedar Mountain Formation, Burro Canyon Formation, Utah, United States, Early Cretaceous (Albian)
  - Tempskya wyomingensis Arnold, 1945 Utah, Wyoming and Colorado, United States, Lower Cretaceous?
  - Tempskya zhangii Yang, Liu et Cheng, 2017 Songliao Basin, Heliongjiang, China, Cretaceous
- Incertae sedis:
  - Tempskya pulchra Corda, 1845 Czech Republic, Cretaceous
  - Tempskya schimperi Corda, 1845 Germany, Czech Republic, France, Lower Cretaceous
  - Tempskya varians Velenovsky, 1888 Czech Republic, Cenomanian (?)
  - Tempskya cretacea Hosius and Marck, 1880, Westfalia, Germany, Late Cretaceous
  - Tempskya erosa, Stokes et Webb, 1915, Lower Greensand Group, England, Lower Cretaceous
  - Tempskya whitei Berry, 1991, Patapsco Formation, Maryland, United States, Lower Cretaceous

== Fossil sites ==
Tempskya finds were thought to be exclusive to the Northern Hemisphere until specimens were discovered in Argentina and Australia, in 2003 and 2005, respectively. Tempskya fossils have also been discovered in the Czech Republic, 2002 and Japan, 1986.
