= Agrio Formation =

Geologic formation in Argentina

- Stratigraphic range: Late Valanginian-earliest Aptian; ~130–120 Ma
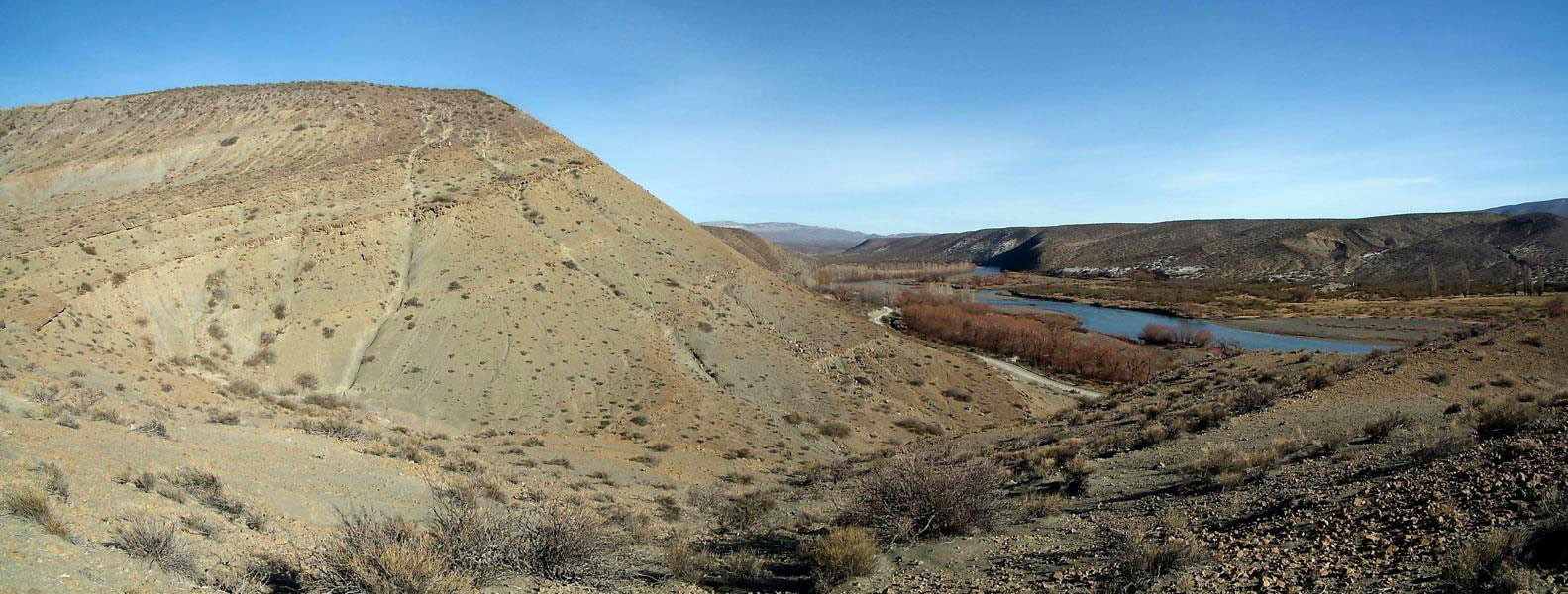
- Agrio Formation at its type section
- Type: Geological formation
- Unit of: Mendoza Group
- Sub-units: Pilmatué, Avilé & Agua de la Mula Members
- Underlies: Huitrín & La Amarga Formations
- Overlies: Mulichinco & Bajada Colorada Formations
- Area: 220 km × 50 km (137 mi × 31 mi)
- Thickness: Up to 1,500 m (4,900 ft)

Lithology
- Primary: Shale, sandstone
- Other: Limestone, conglomerate

Location
- Coordinates: 38.0°S 70.0°W
- Approximate paleocoordinates: 38.2°S 33.7°W
- Region: Mendoza & Neuquén Provinces
- Country: Argentina
- Extent: Neuquén Basin

Type section
- Named for: Agrio River
- Named by: Weaver
- Year defined: 1931
- Agrio Formation (Argentina)

The Agrio Formation is an Early Cretaceous geologic formation that is up to 1,500 metres (4,900 ft) thick and is located in the southern Mendoza Province and northern-central Neuquén Province, in the Neuquén Basin of northwestern Patagonia, Argentina. This formation is the youngest one of the Mendoza Group, overlying the Mulichinco and Bajada Colorada Formations and overlain by the Huitrín and La Amarga Formations. It is dated to the Late Valanginian to Early Hauterivian, Late Valanginian to Early Barremian, or Hauterivian to earliest Aptian.

The Agrio Formation is considered the third most important source rock in the hydrocarbon-rich Neuquén Basin, after the Vaca Muerta Formation and Los Molles Formation. Similarly to these older units, it is potentially a source of shale gas.

This formation has provided fossils of ichthyosaurs, ammonites, gastropods, bivalves, decapods, echinoderm, corals and fish. The newly described species of fish, Tranawuen agrioensis, the ammonite Holcoptychites agrioensis, and the bivalve Pholadomya agrioensis have been named after the formation.

== Description ==
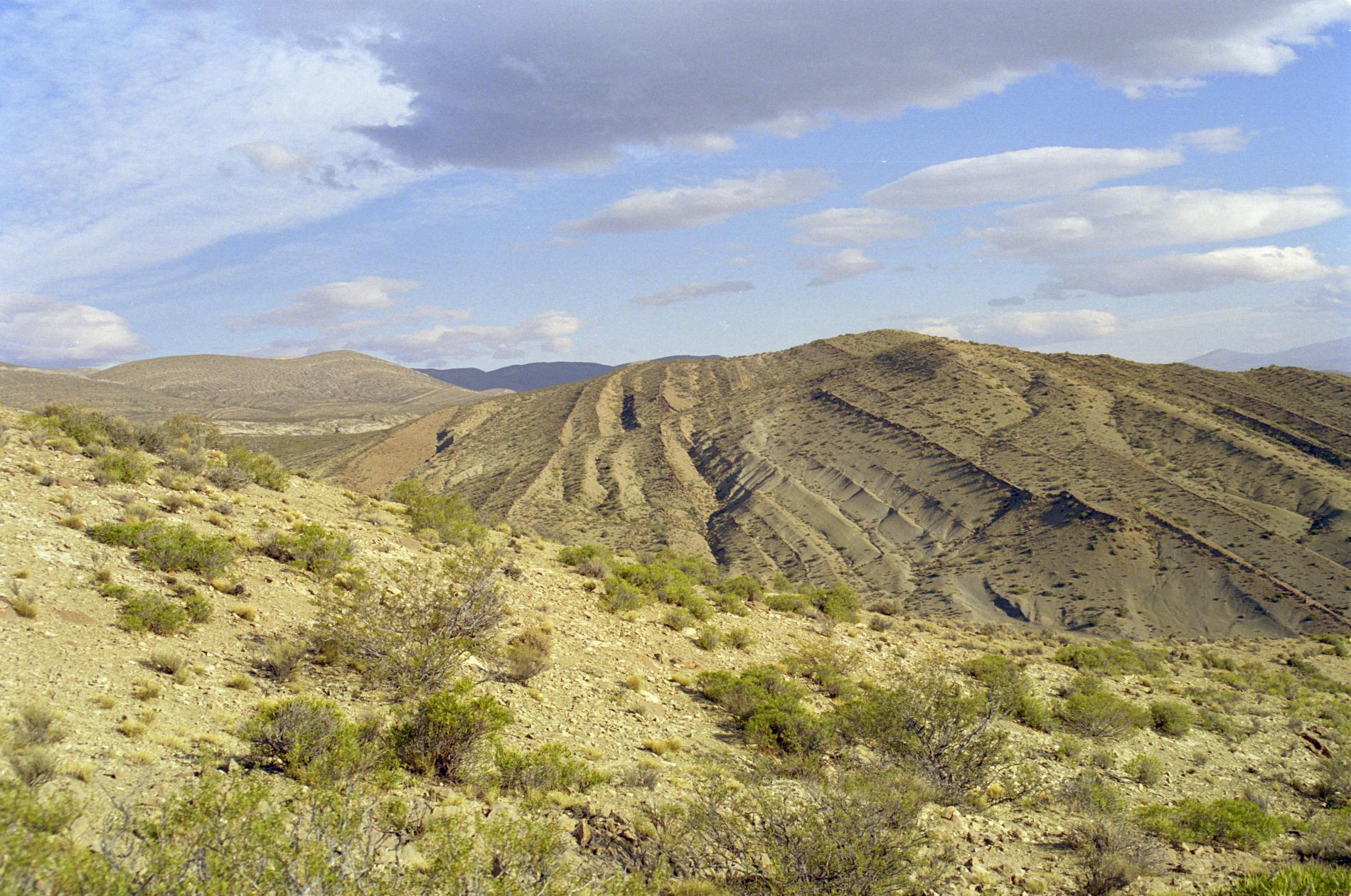
Agrio Formation in Aguada de la Mula

The Agrio Formation was first described by Weaver in 1931 and its three members, from bottom to top: Pilmatué, Avilé and Agua de la Mula Members, were defined by Leanza and Hugo in 2001. The formation crops out in an approximately 50 kilometres (31 mi) wide band from north to south along 70° longitude west, from 37° to 39° south in the northern-central part of the Neuquén Basin. The southern termination of the formation is the Huincul High, formed by the Huincul Fault. Towards the east in the basin, the formation grades into the Centenario Formation.

=== Stratigraphy ===
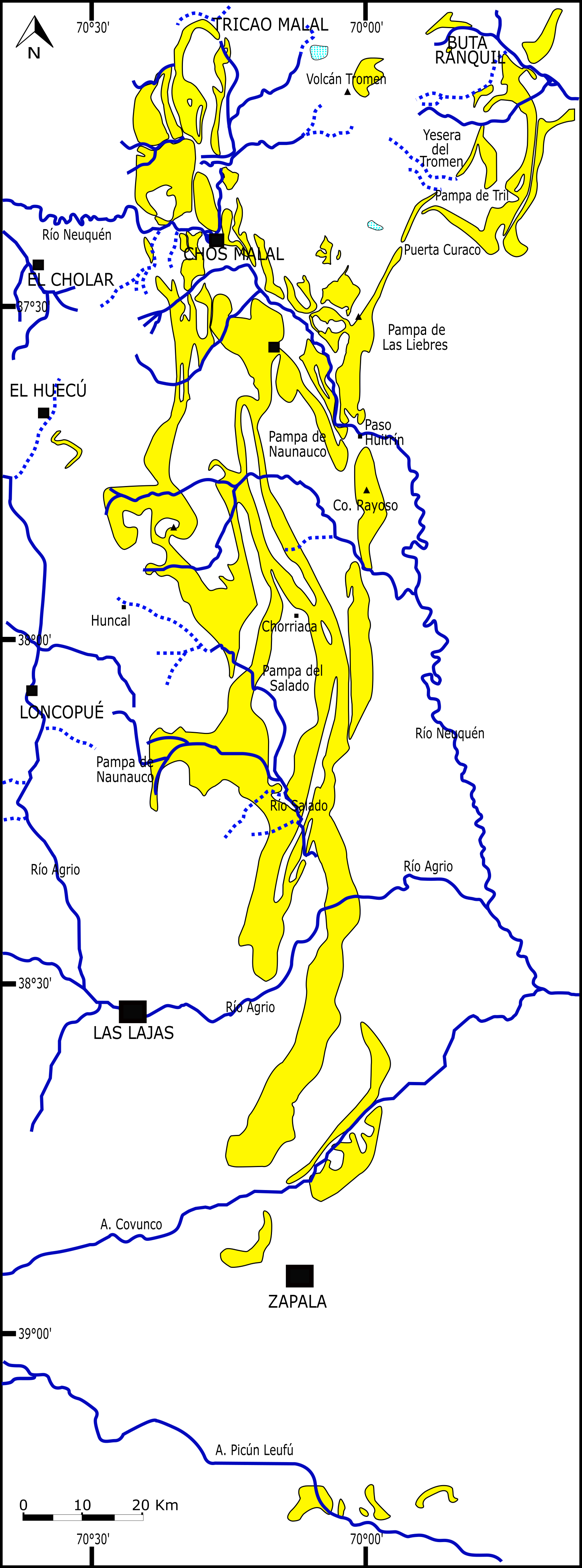
Outcrop extent of the Agrio Formation

The Agrio Formation is included in the Mendoza Group, representing its youngest formation. In the east of the Neuquén Basin, the formation rests upon continental clastic deposits of the Mulichinco Formation, with the contact between the two formations characterized by a regional transgressive surface. Towards the west, the formation unconformably overlies the Bajada Colorada Formation. In its eastern part, the Agrio Formation is overlain by the clastic, carbonaceous and evaporitic deposits of the Huitrín Formation and in the western area by the La Amarga Formation. The total thickness of the Agrio Formation reaches up to 1,500 metres (4,900 ft), with the Pilmatué Member having a thickness of 718 metres (2,356 ft) and the Agua de la Mula Member reaching 501 metres (1,644 ft).

=== Lithologies ===
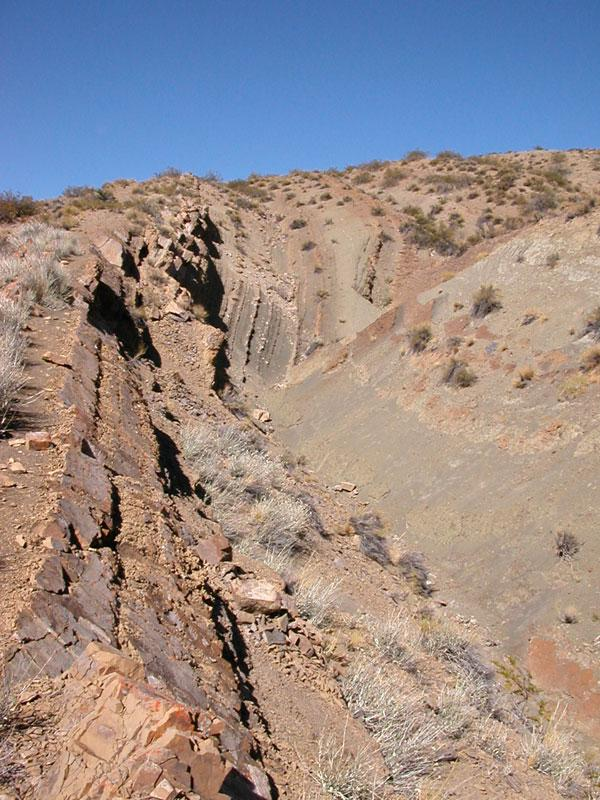
Agrio Formation close to Pilmatué

The Agrio Formation is primarily composed of pelitic rocks with intercalations of limestones, sandstones and rare fine conglomerates. The Pilmatué and Agua de la Mula Members are characterized by thick successions of black shales with intercalating limestones and sandstones. The Avilé Member comprises sandstones and claystones with conglomerates.

=== Depositional environment ===
The Agrio Formation was deposited in a post-rift setting of the Neuquén Basin, probably representing a tectonic regime of thermal subsidence. The sediments of the lower and upper members of the formation are marine in character, interpreted as the combination of thermal subsidence and a eustatic sea level rise. The middle Avilé member was deposited in a fluvial environment. Within the marine Pilmatué Member, a succession of approximately 130 metres (430 ft) thick, described as "San Eduardo Beds", is recognized as deposited in a wave-dominated deltaic setting with hyperdense currents. This sequence is overlain by about 40 metres (130 ft) thick limestones deposits in a reefal environment. The presence of the newly described gastropod Eunerinea mendozana led researchers to estimate tropical conditions for the Agrio Formation.

== Fossil content ==
The formation has provided many fossils of ammonites, gastropods, bivalves, corals, decapods, echinoids, crinoids and nano and microfossils (calcareous nannofossils, ostracods, foraminifers).

In 2018, ichthyosaur remains not determined to the genus level were described from the Agrio Formation, suggesting the possibility of viviparity of these marine reptiles in the epeiric sea of the Neuquén Basin. The finds were notable as well because of a relative lack of abundance of ichthyosaur fossils from the Valanginian to Hauterivian worldwide. Fossil fish of Gyrodus huiliches, and Tranawuen agrioensis were described from the formation in 2019.

The decapod Palaeohomarus pacificus, and ammonites Curacoites rotundus and Sabaudiella riverorum were described from the formation in 2012, the gastropods Ampullina pichinka and Mesalia? kushea in 2016, and the ammonite Comahueites aequalicostatus in 2018.

Newly described species of fish, Tranawuen agrioensis, ammonite, Holcoptychites agrioensis, and the bivalve Pholadomya agrioensis were named after the formation.

The first known brittle stars in the Southern Hemisphere and Cretaceous age have been identified in Agrio Formation. However, fossils are not complete enough to define species.

Dinosaur tracks are known from the aeolian depositional setting of the Avilé Member of the Agrio Formation, including tracks of sauropods, probable ankylosaurs and undetermined bipedal dinosaurs.

== Petroleum geology ==
The Agrio Formation is considered the third-most important source rock of the hydrocarbon-rich Neuquén Basin, after the older Vaca Muerta and Los Molles Formations. Two levels of organic-rich sediments exist in the formation, related to the marine transgressions of the late Valanginian and the late Hauterivian, in the Pilmatué and Agua de la Mula Members respectively. The marly shales of the Pilmatué Member reach up to 400 metres (1,300 ft) thickness in the western Neuquén Basin, while the same facies in the Agua de la Piedra Member is less than 100 metres (330 ft) thick. The organic properties of the formation are similar to the Vaca Muerta, with a TOC value averaging 2.5%, with some levels up to 5%. The kerogen types are II to II/III.

== Gallery ==
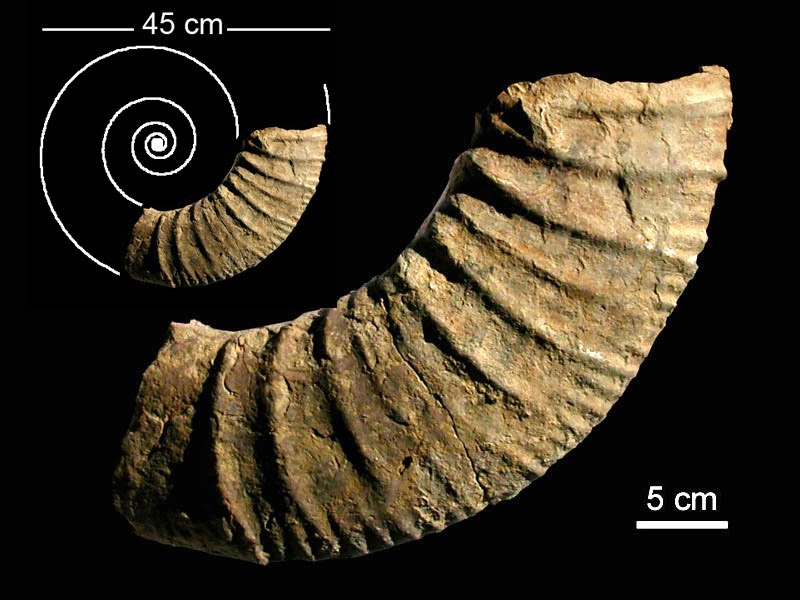
Ammonite from the Agrio Formation

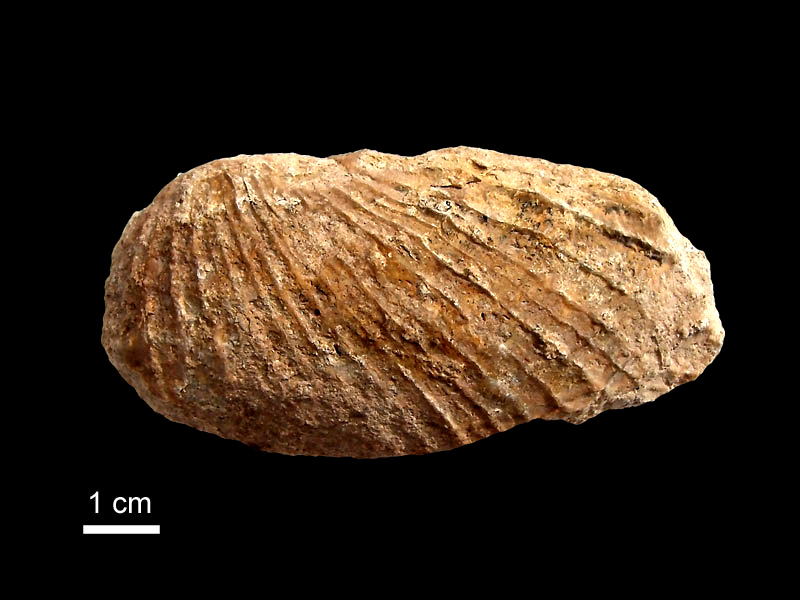
Bivalve from the formation

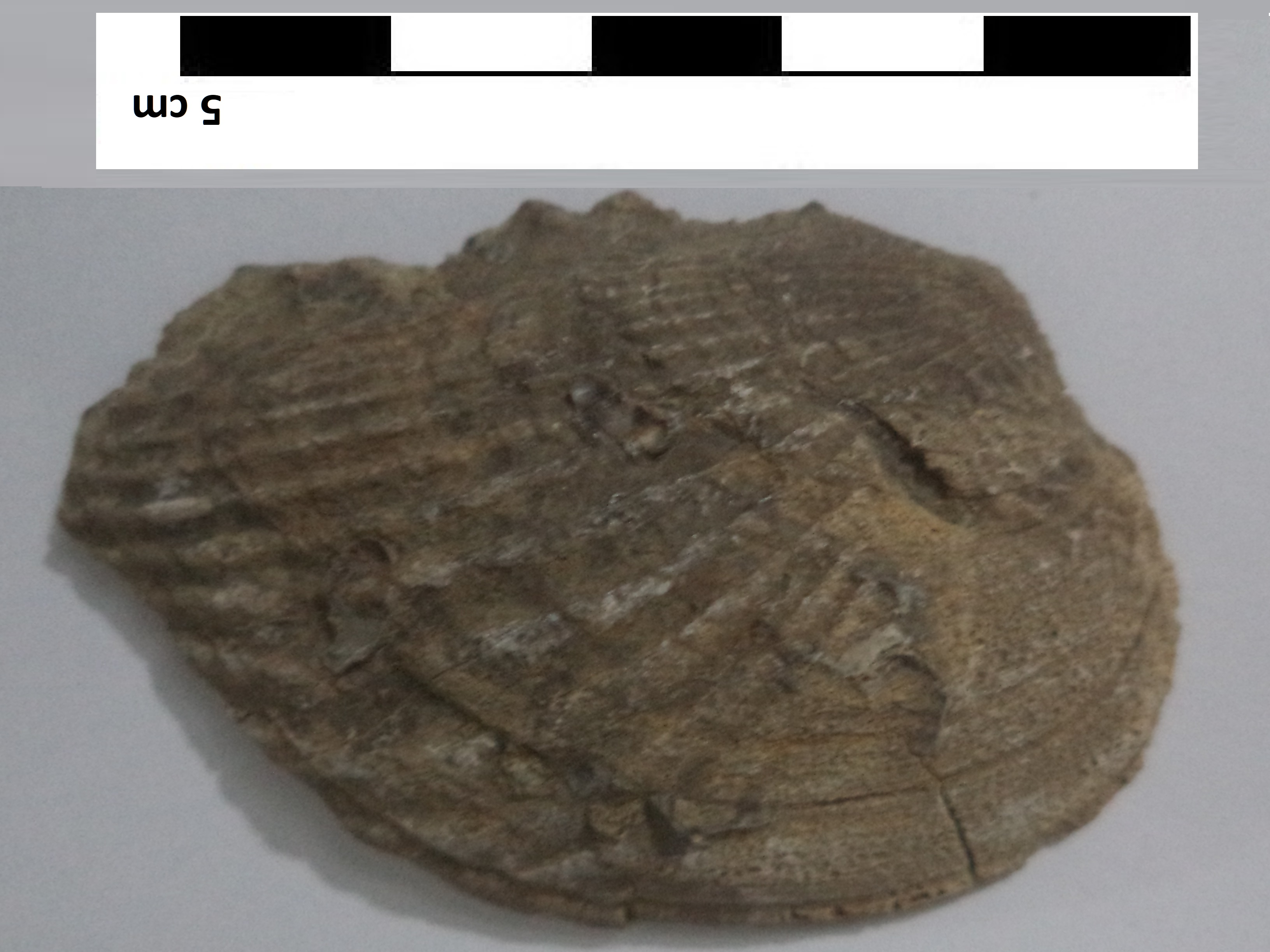
Bivalve (Ptychomya koeneni)

== See also ==
- List of dinosaur-bearing rock formations
- Caiuá Formation, contemporaneous fossiliferous formation of the Paraná Basin
- Cerro Barcino Formation, contemporaneous fossiliferous formation of the Cañadón Asfalto Basin
- Zapata and Río Belgrano Formations, contemporaneous fossiliferous formations of the Magallanes or Austral Basin
