= Mulichinco Formation =

Geological formation in Argentina

- Stratigraphic range: Valanginian; ~140–136 Ma
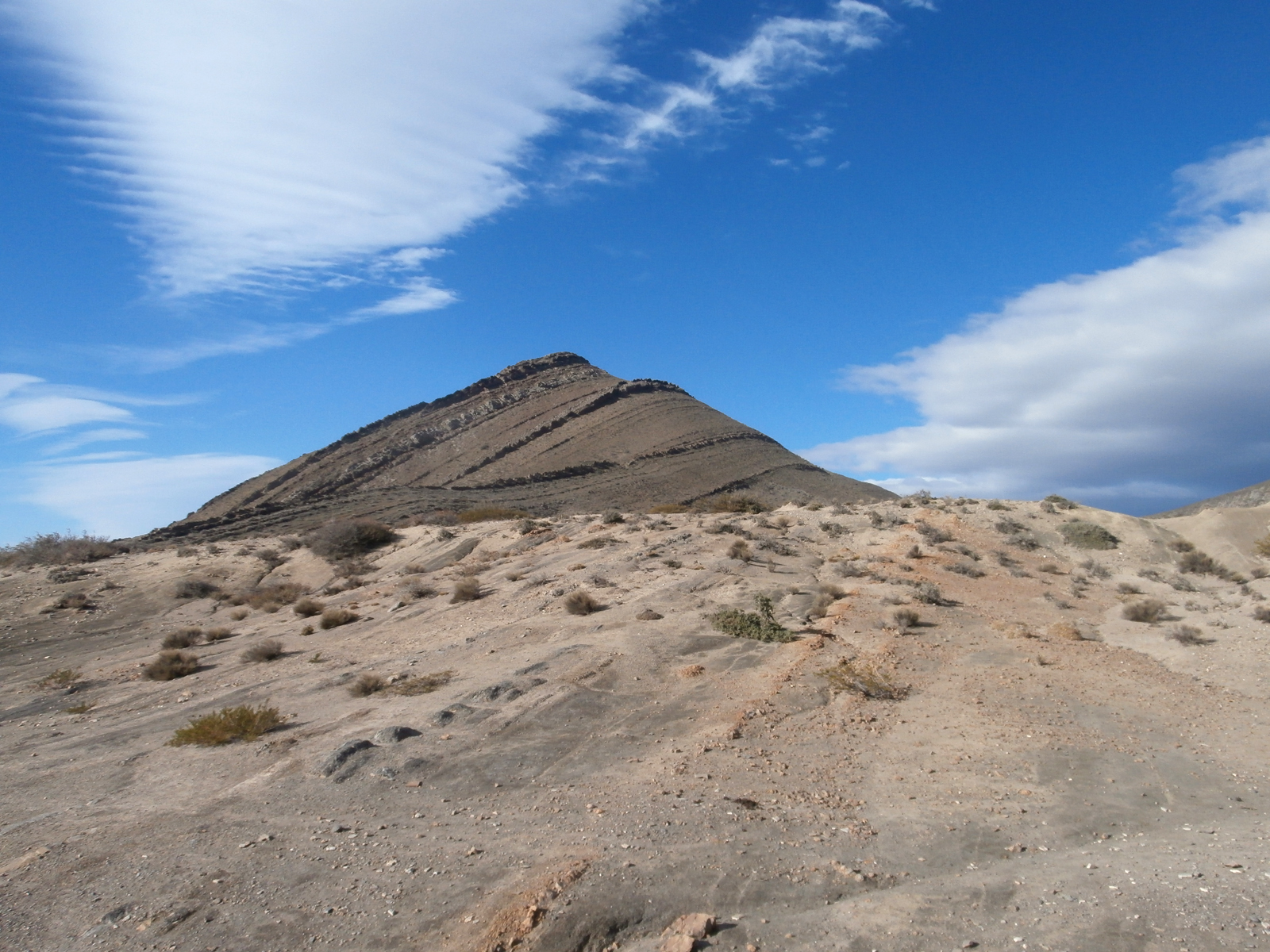
- Mulichinco Formation at Puerta Curaco
- Type: Geological formation
- Unit of: Mendoza Group
- Underlies: Agrio Formation
- Overlies: Vaca Muerta
- Thickness: 200–400 metres (660–1,310 ft)

Lithology
- Primary: Mudstone, siltstone, sandstone
- Other: Limestone

Location
- Coordinates: 38.5°S 70.2°W
- Approximate paleocoordinates: 37.8°S 33.5°W
- Region: Neuquén Province
- Country: Argentina
- Extent: Neuquén Basin
- Mulichinco Formation (Argentina)

The Mulichinco Formation is a geological formation in Argentina. It is Berriasian - Valanginian in age and is predominantly terrestrial, being deposited at a time of marine regression in the Neuquén Basin, and predominantly consists of siliciclastic rocks.

== Fossil content ==
Color key: Taxon / Reclassified taxon / Taxon falsely reported as present / Dubious taxon or junior synonym / Ichnotaxon / Ootaxon / Morphotaxon	Notes; Uncertain or tentative taxa are in small text; ~~crossed out~~ taxa are discredited.

=== Dinosaurs ===
==== Ornithopods ====
Ornithopods of the Mulichinco Formation
Genus	Species	Location	Stratigraphic position	Material	Notes	Images
Emiliasaura	E. alessandrii	Paraje Pilmatué locality	Lower	A partial skeleton	A iguanodontian ornithopod	

==== Sauropods ====
Sauropods of the Mulichinco Formation
Genus	Species	Location	Stratigraphic position	Material	Notes	Images
Pilmatueia	P. faundezi				A dicraeosaurid sauropod	

==== Theropods ====
Theropods of the Mulichinco Formation
Genus	Species	Location	Stratigraphic position	Material	Notes	Images
Lajasvenator	L. ascheriae				A carcharodontosaurid theropod	

=== Echinoderms ===
Echinoderms of the Mulichinco Formation
Genus	Species	Location	Stratigraphic position	Material	Notes	Images
Tethyaster	T. antares				A astropectinid starfish	

=== Plants ===
Plants of the Mulichinco Formation
Genus	Species	Location	Stratigraphic position	Material	Notes	Images
Podocarpoxylon	P. prumnopityoides				A podocarp	
Tempskya	T. dernbachii				A tree fern	
