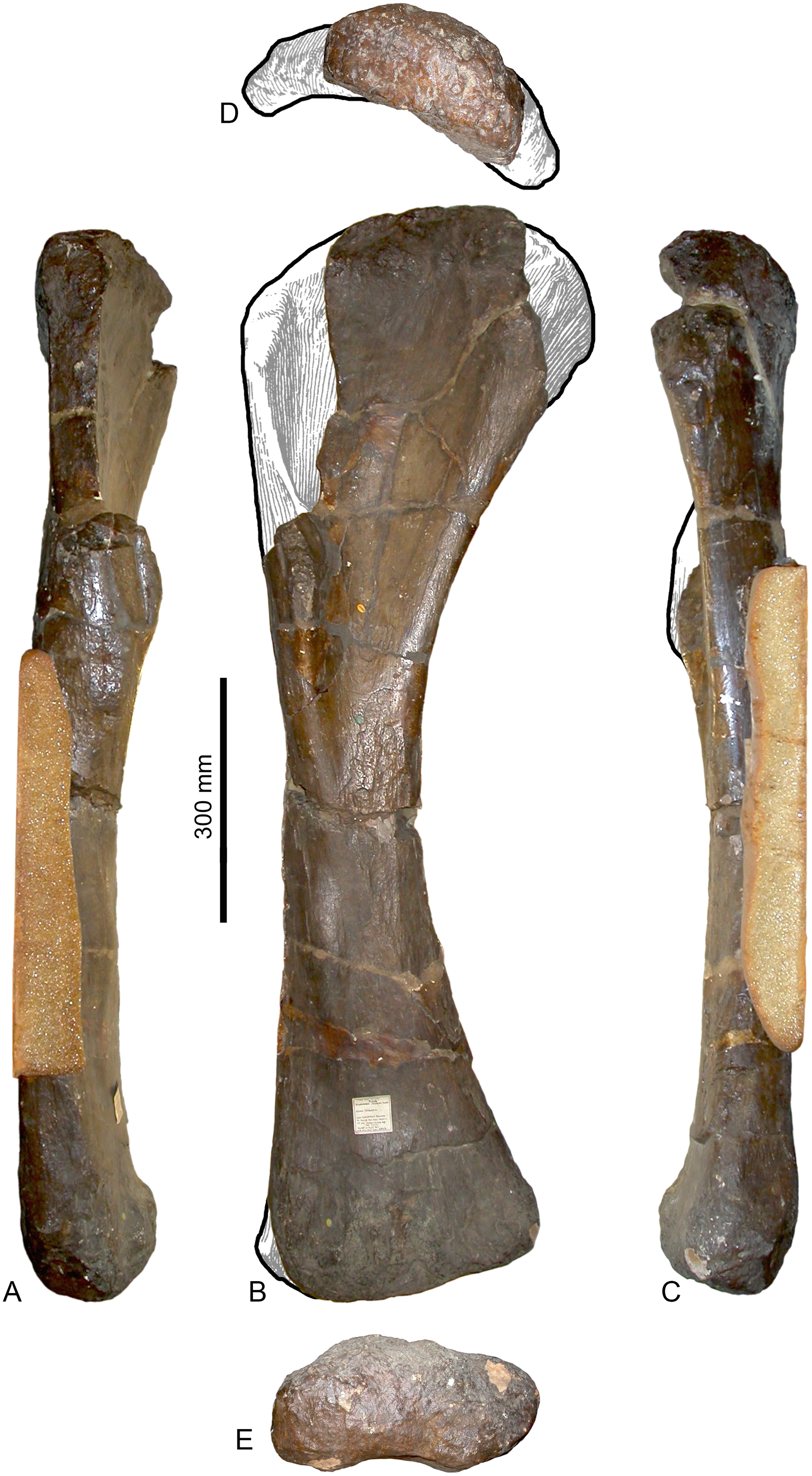
- Holotype humerus

Scientific classification
- Kingdom: Animalia
- Phylum: Chordata
- Class: Reptilia
- Clade: Dinosauria
- Clade: Saurischia
- Clade: †Sauropodomorpha
- Clade: †Sauropoda
- Clade: †Eusauropoda
- Clade: †Macronaria
- Family: †Brachiosauridae
- Genus: †Pelorosaurus; Mantell, 1850
- Species: †P. brevis

Binomial name
- †Pelorosaurus brevis (Owen, 1842)

Synonyms
- Cetiosaurus brevis Owen, 1842; Cetiosaurus conybeari Melville, 1849

= Pelorosaurus =

Pelorosaurus Temporal range: Early Cretaceous, 132 Ma

Genus of dinosaur

Pelorosaurus (/pəˌlɒroʊˈsɔːrəs/ pə-LORR-oh-SOR-əs; meaning "monstrous lizard") is a genus of titanosauriform sauropod dinosaur. Remains referred to Pelorosaurus date from the Early Cretaceous period, about 140–125 million years ago, and have been found in England. Thomas Holtz estimated its length at 24 m (79 ft). The name Pelorosaurus was one of the first to be given to any sauropod. Many species have been assigned to the genus historically, but most are currently considered to belong to other genera. Problematically, the first named species of Pelorosaurus, P. conybeari, is a junior synonym of Cetiosaurus brevis (now Pelorosaurus brevis).

== History ==
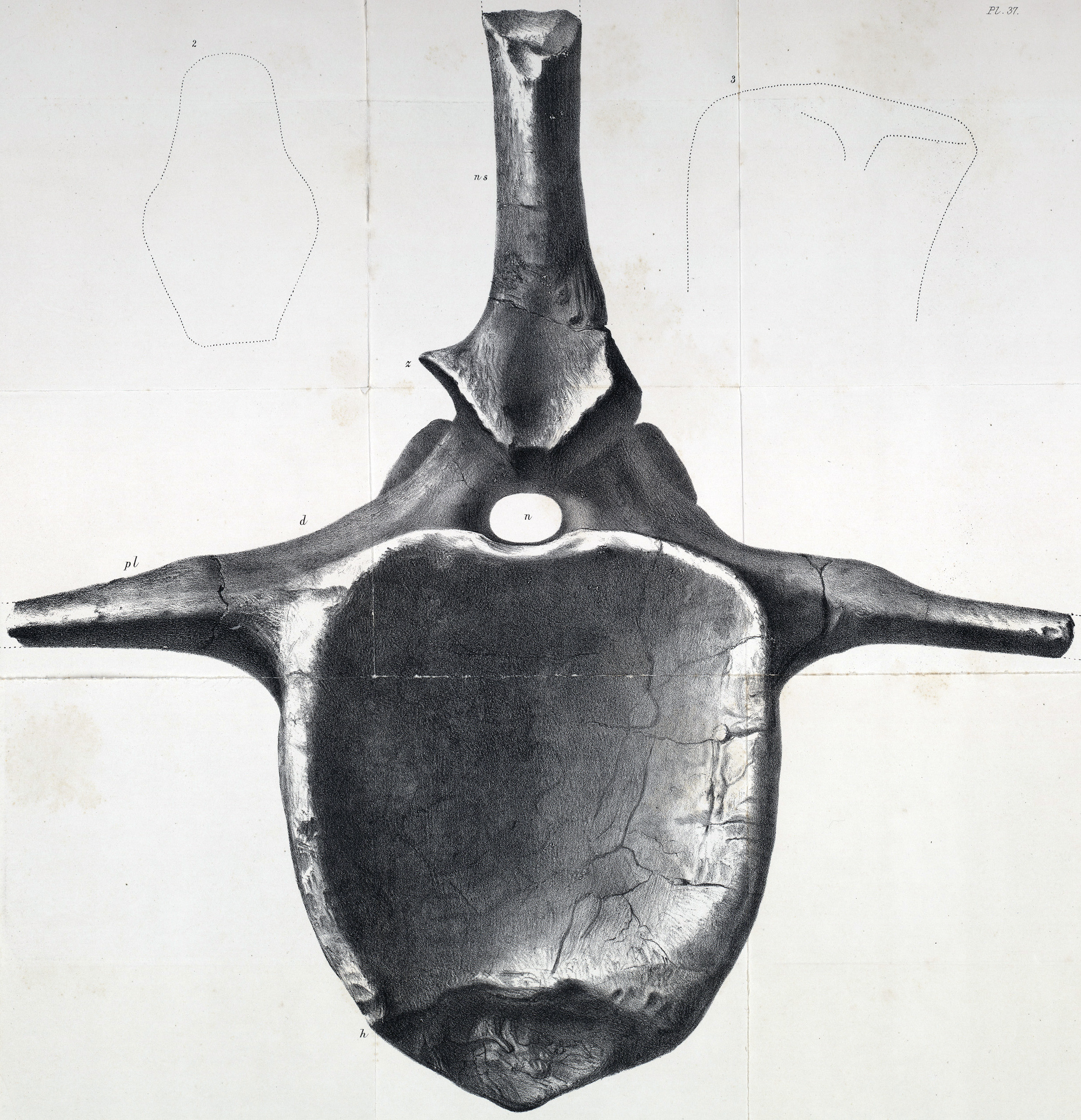
NHMUK PV R28633 (formerly BMNH R28633), one of nine caudal vertebrae in 1853 referred by Owen to P. conybeari

Pelorosaurus was one of the first sauropods to be identified as a dinosaur, although it was not the first to be discovered. Richard Owen had discovered Cetiosaurus in 1841 but had incorrectly identified it as a gigantic sea-going crocodile-like reptile. Mantell identified Pelorosaurus as a dinosaur, living on land.

The taxonomic history of Pelorosaurus and Cetiosaurus, as noted by reviewers including Michael P. Taylor and Darren Naish, is highly confusing. In 1842, Richard Owen named several species of Cetiosaurus. Among them was Cetiosaurus brevis, based on several specimens from the early Cretaceous Period. Some of these, four caudal vertebrae, NHMUK PV OR 2544–2547, and three chevrons, NHMUK PV OR 2548–2550, found around 1825 by John Kingdon near Cuckfield in the Tunbridge Wells Sand Formation of the Hastings Beds, belonged to sauropods. Others however, including NHMUK PV OR 10390, found near Sandown Bay on the Isle of Wight, and NHMUK PV OR 2133 and OR 2115, found near Hastings, actually belonged to some iguanodont. Noticing Owen's mistake in assigning iguanodont bones to Cetiosaurus, comparative anatomist Alexander Melville renamed the sauropod bones Cetiosaurus conybeari in 1849.

In 1850, Gideon Mantell decided that C. conybeari was so different from Cetiosaurus that it needed a new genus, so he reclassified it under the new name Pelorosaurus conybeari. Mantell had originally, in November 1849, intended to use the name "Colossosaurus", but upon discovering that kolossos was Greek for "statue" and not "giant", he changed his mind. The generic name is derived from the Greek pelor, "monster". He also emended the specific name (honouring William Conybeare) to conybearei, but under the present rules of the ICZN, the original conybeari, today written without a capital, has priority. Mantell not only used the sauropod material of C. brevis as the type of Pelorosaurus conybeari but also a large humerus found by miller Peter Fuller at the same site, NHMUK PV OR 28626, which he assumed to have been of the same individual, being discovered only a few metres away from the vertebrae. Mantell acquired the bone for £8. The humerus, clearly shaped to vertically support the weight of the body and presumed to possess a medullary cavity, showed that Pelorosaurus was a land animal. This was a main motive in naming a separate genus; shortly afterwards, however, by studying the sacral vertebrae of Cetiosaurus Mantell established that it too lived on land.

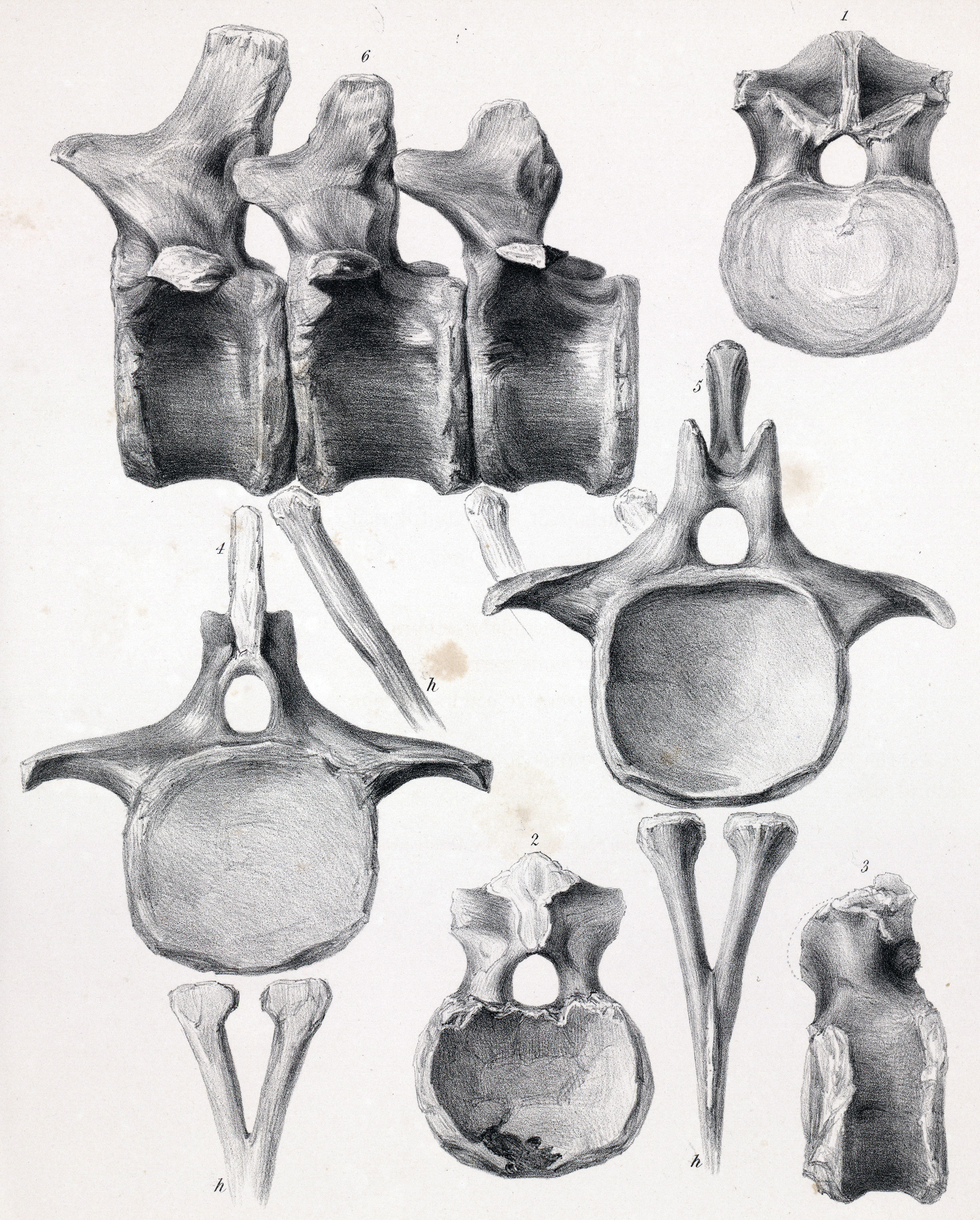
The caudal sauropod vertebrae that form the type specimen of C. brevis

Owen was highly piqued by Melville's and Mantell's attempts to "suppress" his Cetiosaurus brevis. By a publication in 1853 he tried to set matters straight, as he saw it, while avoiding having to openly admit his original mistake. First he suggested that Melville's main motivation for the name change was the presumed inaccuracy of the epithet brevis, "short", because the total length of the animal could not be deduced from such limited remains. Owen pointed out that anyone being acquainted with taxonomy would have understood that "short" referred to the vertebrae themselves, not to the animal as a whole. On a subsequent page, apparently separate from this issue, Owen in covert terms implied that his 1842 publication was not descriptive enough, thus merely having resulted in a nomen nudum, to which he now assigned the sauropod material, making Cetiosaurus brevis a valid name. This still left the problem of it having been named a new genus by Mantell. Owen resolved it by simply presenting the humerus as the sole holotype of Pelorosaurus conybeari. Remarkably, in 1859 he repeated his mistake by again referring iguanodontid vertebrae, specimens NHMUK PV OR 1010 and OR 28635, to C. brevis. The last of these he had in 1853 proposed to belong to Pelorosaurus together with a number of other iguanodontid vertebrae because Mantell had once labelled them as such in his collection; Owen suggested it had been by a mere mistake that the name Pelorosaurus had been connected with the C. brevis material instead of with these finds.

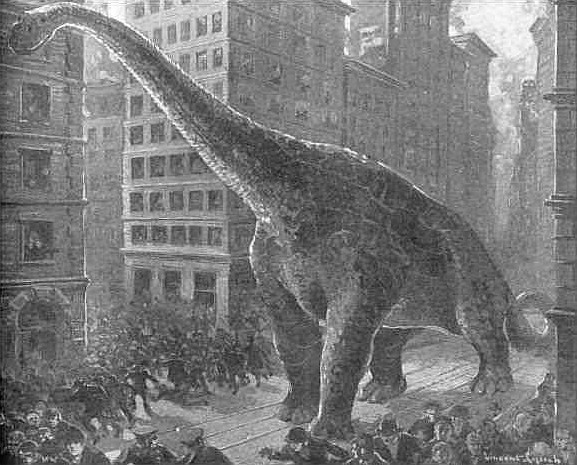
Fanciful 1914 restoration of Pelorosaurus by Vincent Lynch

Owen's interpretation was commonly accepted until well into the twentieth century. By 1970 however, both John Ostrom and Rodney Steel understood that Owen's claim that C. brevis in 1842 was still a nomen nudum should be rejected as a transparent attempt to change the type specimen, inadmissible by present standards. By those same standards though, Melville's name change was also incorrect: as the name Cetiosaurus brevis was still "available" he should simply have made the sauropod bones the lectotype, removing the iguanodontid remains from the syntype series. The sauropod bones, not the iguanodont bones, would then have retained the name C. brevis. Therefore, Cetiosaurus conybeari is a junior objective synonym of C. brevis, that is, C. brevis is not only an older name, but one based on exactly the same fossils as the younger, invalid name.

After 1850, more specimens continued to be assigned to both Pelorosaurus and Cetiosaurus, and both were studied and reported on extensively in the scientific literature. Slowly a tendency developed to subsume fragmentary sauropod material from the Jurassic of England under the designation Cetiosaurus, while assigning incomplete European Cretaceous sauropod finds to Pelorosaurus. Pelorosaurus thus came to be a typical wastebasket taxon for any European sauropod of this period. However, in recent years much work has been done to rectify the confusion.

== Classification ==
The validity of Pelorosaurus is problematic. P. conybeari was based on a separately discovered humerus and vertebrae. However, these specimens might not belong to the same animal. P. conybeari is also a junior synonym of the older name Cetiosaurus brevis. In 2007, Michael P. Taylor and Darren Naish stated their intention to petition the International Commission on Zoological Nomenclature (ICZN) in order to designate the more widely used name P. conybeari the type species of Pelorosaurus and officially abandon the name C. brevis. However, the issue of the Pelorosaurus type species did not end up as part of their petition when it was officially filed and accepted.

Many species have later been assigned to Pelorosaurus, most of which today are considered different dinosaurs. One notable species, P. becklesii, was known from a humerus, radius and ulna, as well as skin impressions. This specimen has since been made the new genus Haestasaurus.

=== Valid species ===
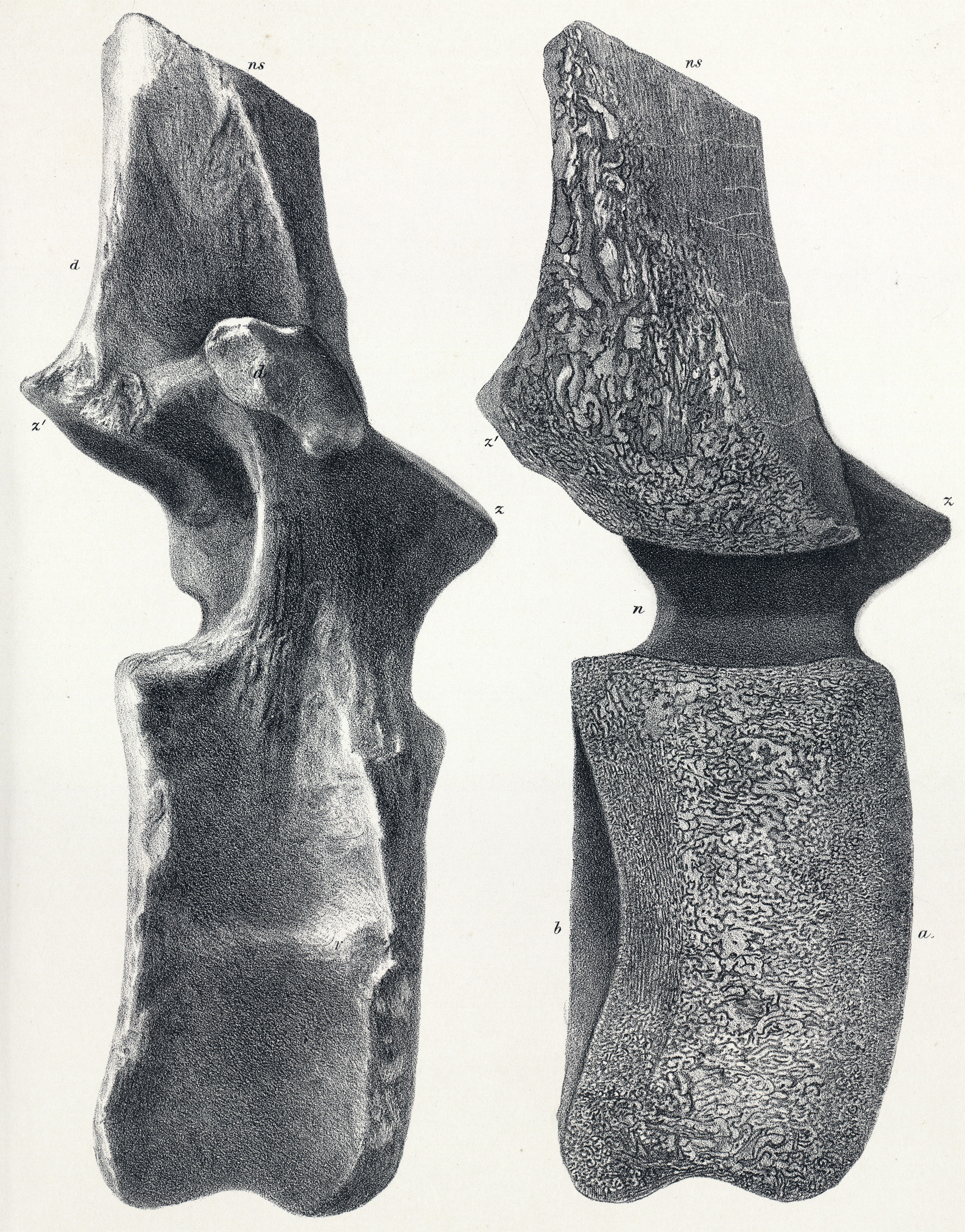
Dorsal vertebra assigned to Cetiosaurus brevis

- Cetiosaurus brevis Owen 1842
  - Synonyms:
  - Cetiosaurus conybeari Melville 1849
  - Pelorosaurus conybearei (Melville 1849) Mantell 1850
  - Pelorosaurus brevis (Owen 1842) Huene 1927
  - Ornithopsis conybearei (Melville 1849) Huene 1929

=== Misassigned species ===
- P. becklesii Mantell 1852 = Haestasaurus becklesii
- P. manseli Hulke in Lydekker 1888 (nomen dubium) = Ischyrosaurus manseli
- P. humerocristatus (Hulke 1874) Sauvage 1887 = Duriatitan humerocristatus.
- P. armatus (Gervais 1852) Lydekker 1889 = Oplosaurus armatus
- P. hulkei (Seeley 1870) Lydekker 1889 = Ornithopsis hulkei
- P. leedsii (Hulke 1887) Lydekker 1890 (nomen dubium) = Ornithopsis leedsii
- P. praecursor (Sauvage 1876) Sauvage 1895 = Neosodon praecursor
- P. mackesoni (Owen 1884) Steel 1970 (nomen dubium) = Dinodocus mackesoni
- P. megalonyx (Seeley 1869) Huene 1909 (nomen dubium) = Gigantosaurus megalonyx

=== Relationships ===
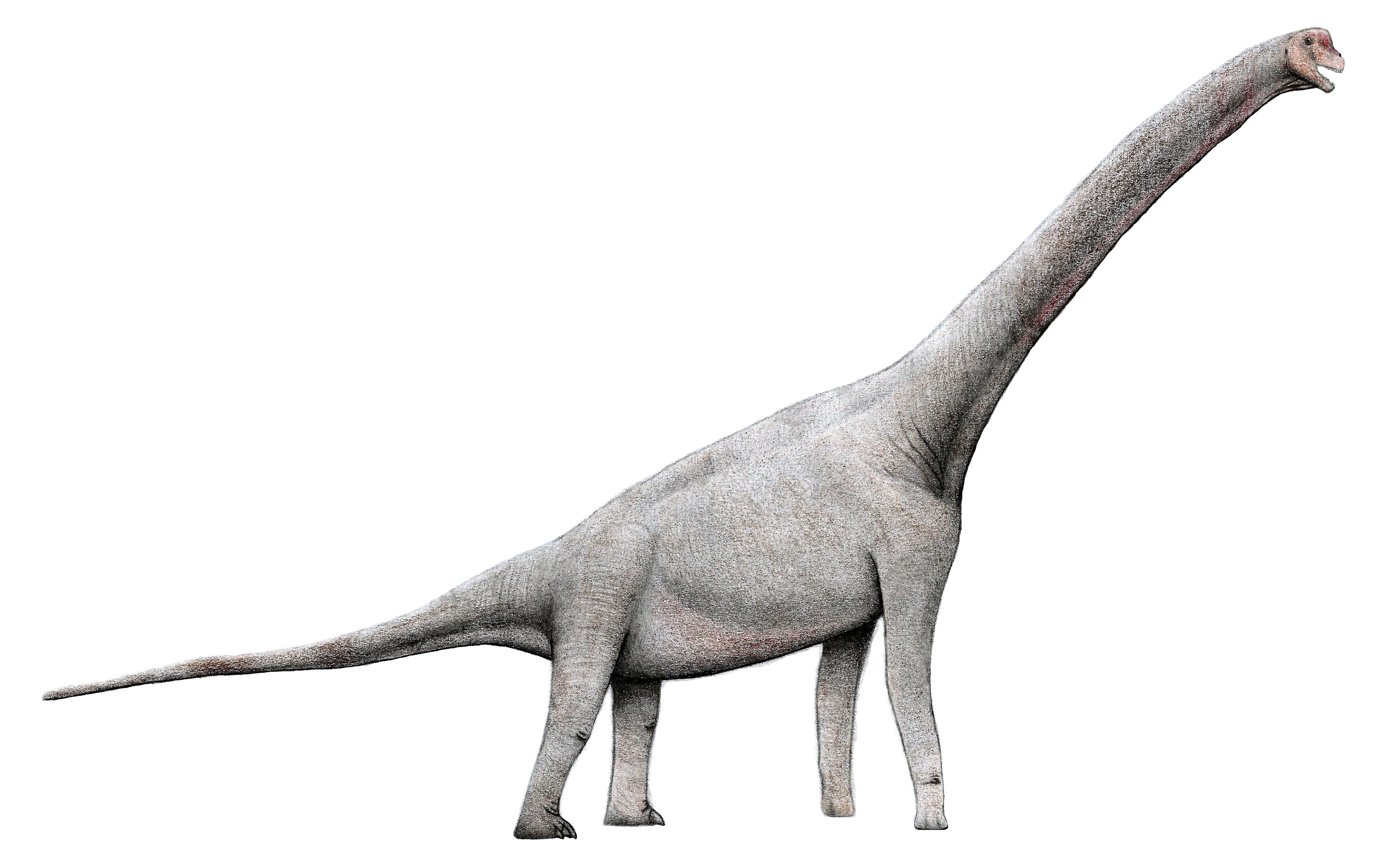
Speculative life restoration.

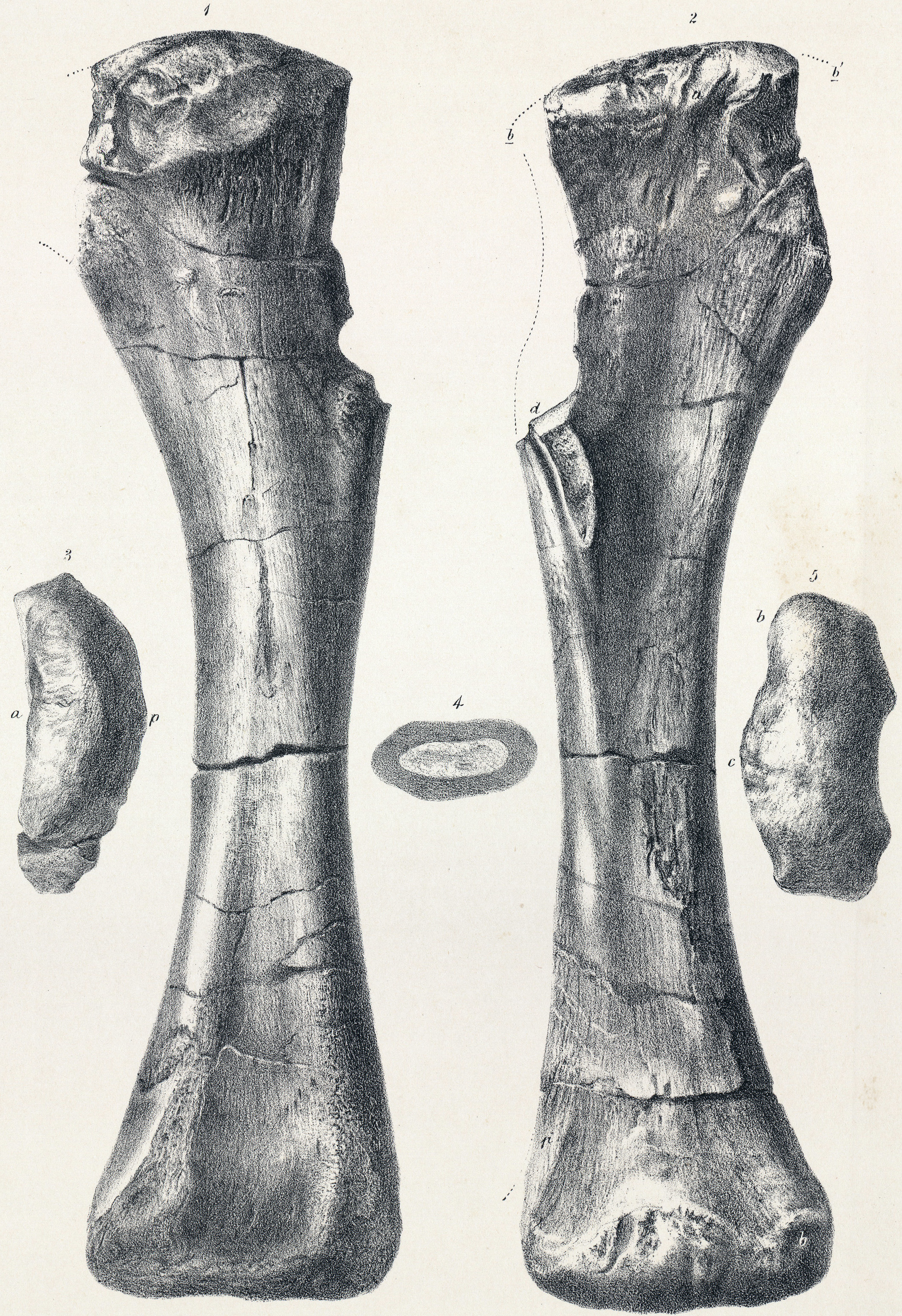
Holotype humerus lithograph

Mantell was the first to suggest a relationship between Pelorosaurus and dinosaurs. In 1852 Friedrich August Quenstedt formally listed it in the Dinosauria. Predictably, Owen at first rejected this classification, still in 1859 considering it a member of the Crocodilia.

In 1882 Henri-Émile Sauvage first stated it belonged to the Sauropoda. That group being still very incompletely known however, it proved difficult to determine its more precise affinities, with the Atlantosauridae, Cardiodontidae, Cetiosauridae and Morosauridae being suggested until in 1927 von Huene understood the possible link with Brachiosaurus, placing Pelorosaurus in the Brachiosauridae, a placement followed by subsequent authors until the early 21st century. The humerus, 137 centimeters long and very elongated, strongly suggests a typical brachiosaurid trait was present: the possession of relatively long front limbs. The uncertainties about whether the qualities of the vertebrae or the humerus should be analysed, both specimens not necessarily belonging to the same taxon, prevents any firm conclusion to be reached, however. In recent years, the material was commonly placed in a more general Titanosauriformes.
