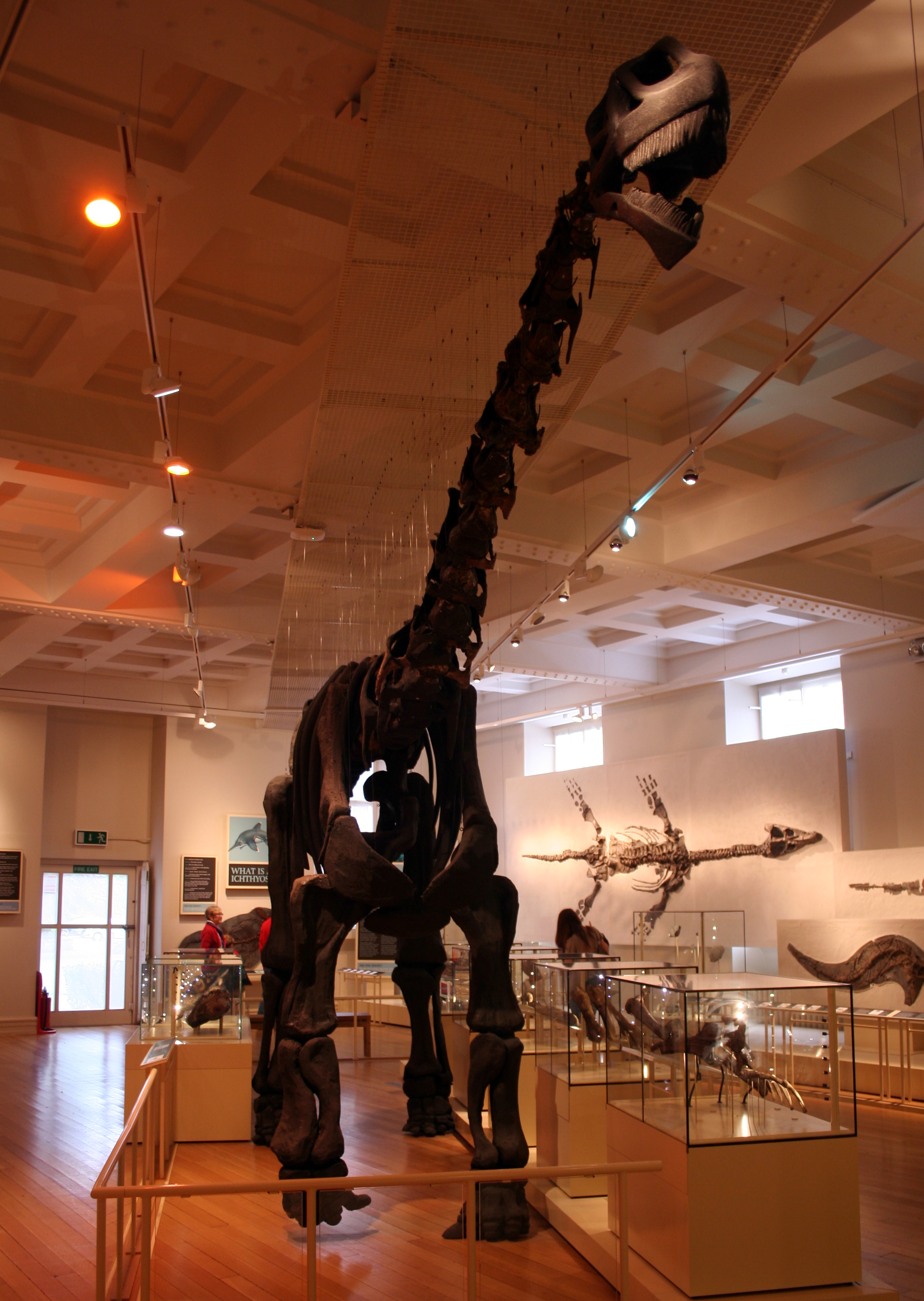
- Mounted skeleton, Leicester Museum & Art Gallery

Scientific classification
- Kingdom: Animalia
- Phylum: Chordata
- Class: Reptilia
- Clade: Dinosauria
- Clade: Saurischia
- Clade: †Sauropodomorpha
- Clade: †Sauropoda
- Clade: †Eusauropoda
- Family: †Cetiosauridae
- Subfamily: †Cetiosaurinae; Lydekker, 1888
- Genus: †Cetiosaurus; Owen, 1841
- Species: †C. oxoniensis

Binomial name
- †Cetiosaurus oxoniensis Phillips, 1871

= Cetiosaurus =

Cetiosaurus Temporal range: Middle Jurassic (Bajocian-Bathonian) ~171–165 Ma

Extinct species of reptile

Cetiosaurus (/ˌsiːtioʊˈsɔːrəs, ˌsiːʃi-/ meaning 'whale lizard', from the Greek keteios/κήτειος meaning 'sea monster' (later, 'whale') and sauros/σαυρος meaning 'lizard'), is a genus of herbivorous sauropod dinosaur from the Middle Jurassic Period, living about 171 to 165 million years ago during the Bajocian and Bathonian ages in what is now Britain and probably France.

Cetiosaurus was named in 1842, making it the first sauropod from which bones were described and is the most complete sauropod found in England. It was so named because its describer, Sir Richard Owen, supposed it was a marine creature, initially an extremely large crocodile, and did not recognise it for a land-dwelling dinosaur. Because of the early description many species would be named in the genus, eventually eighteen of them. Most of these have now been placed in other genera or are understood to be dubious names, based on poor fossil material. The last is true also of the original type species, Cetiosaurus medius, and so C. oxoniensis was officially made the new type species in 2014. C. oxoniensis is based on three more-or-less-complete specimens, discovered from 1868 onwards. Together they contain most of the bones, with the exception of the skull. Cetiosaurus was a quadrupedal, long-necked, small-headed herbivore. It had a shorter tail and neck than most sauropods. The forelimbs on the other hand, were relatively long. It is estimated to have been about 16 metres (52 ft) long and to have weighed roughly 11 tonnes (12 short tons).

== Discovery and species ==
=== Initial finds ===
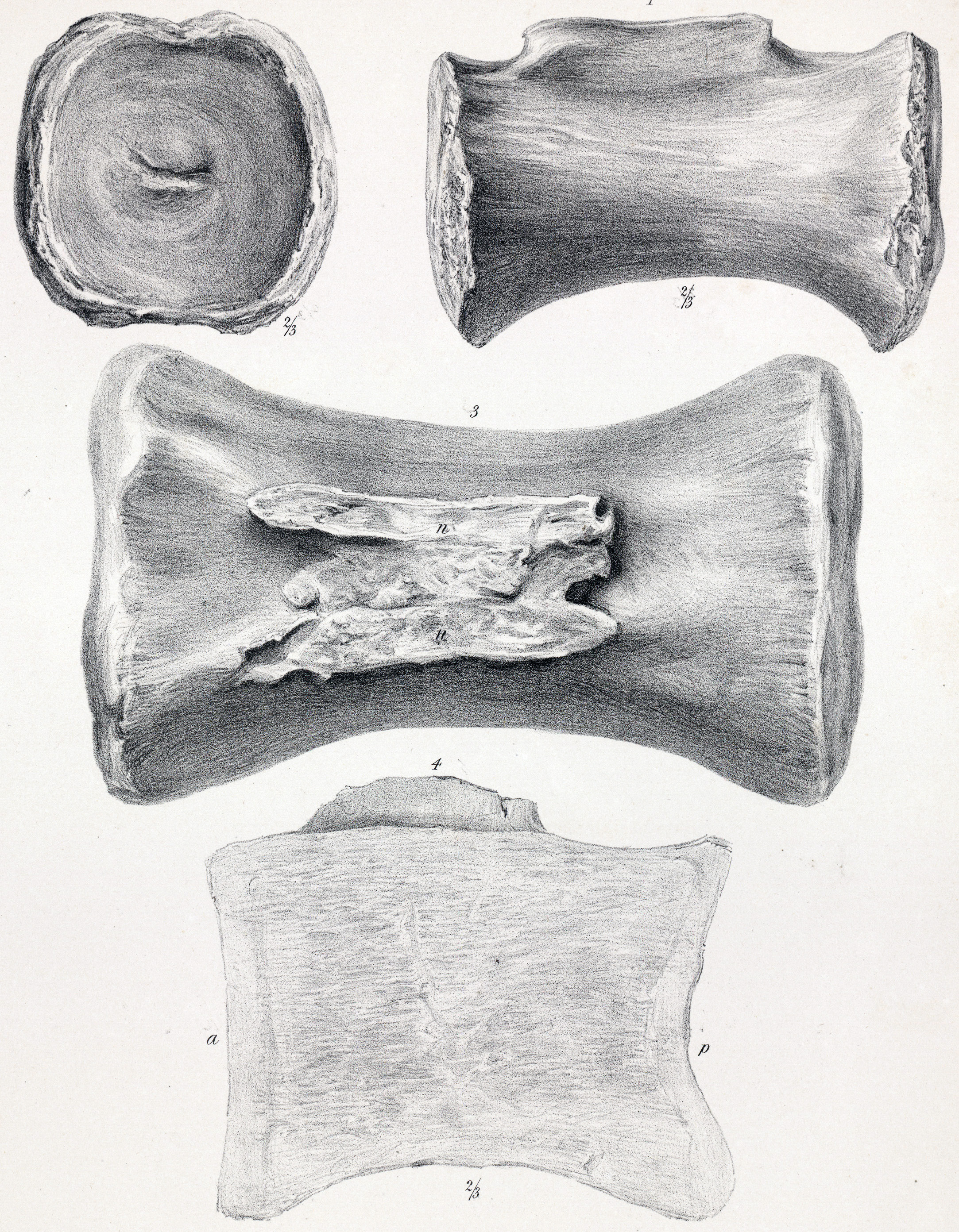
Caudal vertebra of C. longus

Cetiosaurus is, with the exception of the tooth genus Cardiodon, the first sauropod to be discovered and named as well as being the best known sauropod from England. Numerous species have been assigned to Cetiosaurus over the years belonging to several different groups of sauropod dinosaurs. The genus thus functioned as a typical "wastebasket taxon". Fossilized remains once assigned to Cetiosaurus have mainly been found in England but also in France, Switzerland and Morocco.

The first fossils, vertebrae and limb elements, were discovered near Chipping Norton, Oxfordshire in the early nineteenth century and were reported upon by collector John Kingdon in a letter read on 3 June 1825 to the Geological Society; they were seen as possibly belonging to a whale or crocodile. In 1841 biologist, comparative anatomist and palaeontologist Sir Richard Owen, named these as the genus Cetiosaurus, the year before he coined the term Dinosauria. Owen initially did not recognise Cetiosaurus for a dinosaur but considered it a gigantic sea-dwelling reptile. This was reflected by the name, derived from Greek κήτειος, kèteios, "sea-monster". In 1842 Owen named two species in the genus: Cetiosaurus hypoolithicus and Cetiosaurus epioolithicus. The specific names reflected whether the finds had been made below (hypo) or above (epi) the so-called oolithic layers. The first species was based on the material of Kingdon; the latter on vertebrae and metacarpals found at White Nab in Yorkshire. The publication did not contain a sufficient description and the species are often considered nomina nuda. The same year in a subsequent publication Owen named four additional Cetiosaurus species: Cetiosaurus brevis, "the short one"; Cetiosaurus brachyurus, "the short-tailed"; Cetiosaurus medius, "the medium-sized", and Cetiosaurus longus, "the long one". Owen had abandoned the two earlier names, as shown by the fact that their fossils were referred to several of the new species. These again were each mostly based on disparate material, from often geographically widely separated sites.

As became apparent in 1849, some of these bones were not sauropod in nature at all but of Iguanodontidae. That year Alexander Melville, in a misguided attempt to clear matters up, named the authentic sauropod material of C. brevis as Cetiosaurus conybeari but thereby merely created a junior objective synonym of the former name. In 1842, Owen noted a partial skeleton of a sauropod dinosaur consisting of "five vertebrae, a scapula, coracoid, sternal plate, and portions of limb bone", found in rock exposed by railway construction near Blisworth, Northamptonshire, which he attributed to the species Cetiosaurus medius.^{101} However this specimen was lost by 1871, as in a book by Professor John Phillips published that year he was unable to locate the specimen. It has been suggested that two tail vertebrae mentioned by Richard Lydekker in 1888 as being the collection of the Natural History Museum in London, which were catalogued as BMNH R16090 and R160901, and recorded as having been purchased from Blisworth by the museum in 1843, originate from the Blisworth skeleton. However in a 2003 paper on the taxonomy of Cetiosaurus, neither of the two vertebrae were able to be located in the museum's collections by the paper's authors.

=== Cetiosaurus oxoniensis ===
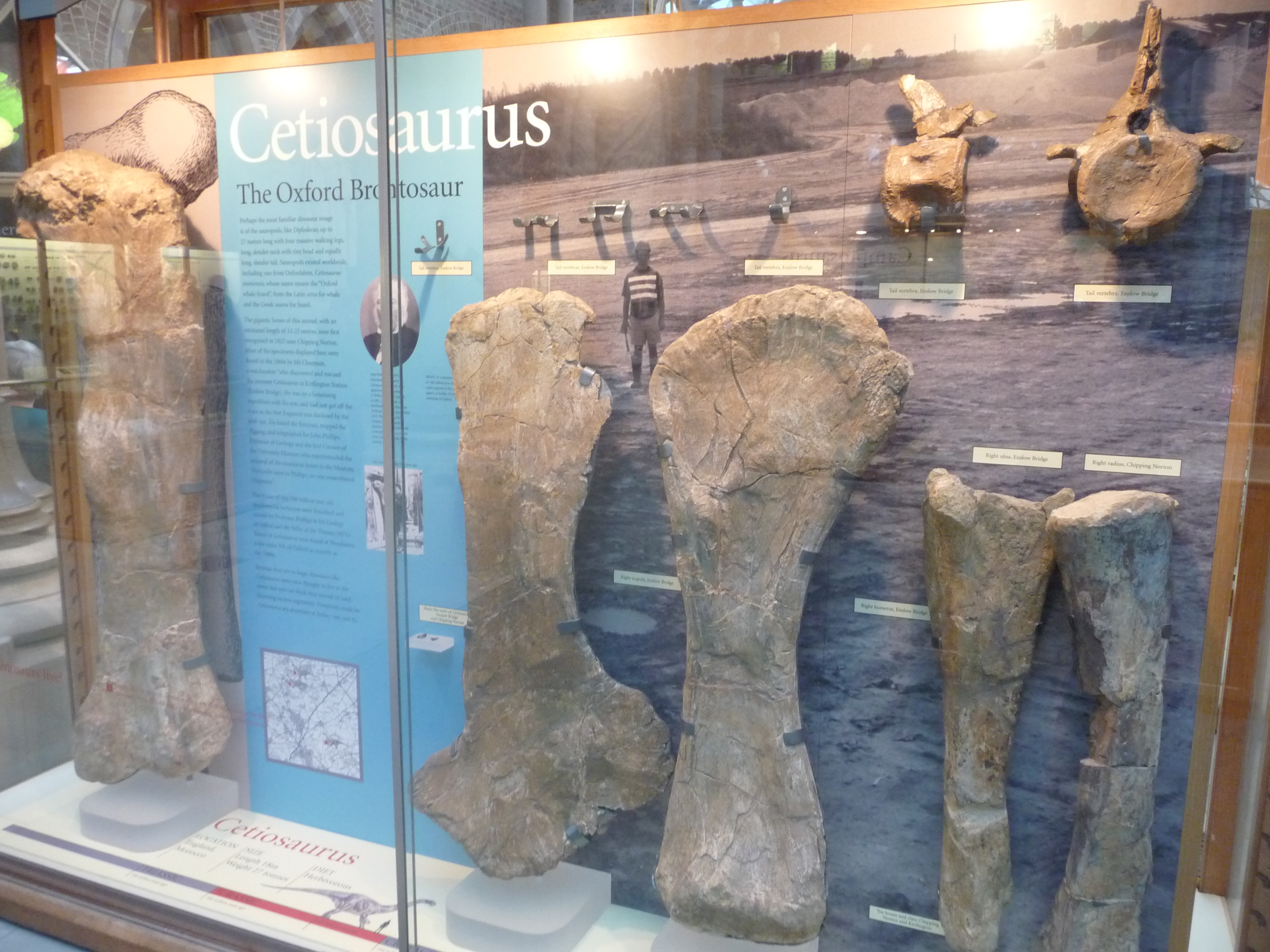
Fossils of C. oxoniensis at the Oxford University Museum of Natural History

In March 1868, workers near Bletchingdon discovered a sauropod right femur. Between March 1869 and June 1870 Professor John Phillips, further investigating the site, in a layer dating from the Bathonian uncovered three skeletons and additional bone material. In 1871 based on these he named two species: Cetiosaurus oxoniensis (originally spelled Ceteosaurus Oxoniensis) and Cetiosaurus glymptonensis. "Oxoniensis" refers to Oxford, "glymptonensis" to Glympton. Already in 1870 Thomas Huxley had published a letter by Phillips in which the latter named a Cetiosaurus giganteus based on specimen OUMNH J13617, a left femur earlier found at Bletchingdon; as the letter did not contain a description, this is a nomen nudum.

A century later, a new C. oxoniensis specimen (LCM G468.1968), subsequently named by the local media, the "Rutland Dinosaur", was unknowingly excavated on 19 June 1968 in the form of several tons of discarded siderite ironstone from a clay-pit near Great Casterton, Rutland, which was subsequently deduced to be from the base of the Rutland Formation dating to the Bajocian. The excavator driver recognised what he correctly thought might be bone fragments amidst the pile of broken blocks and consequently the ironstone was removed to Leicester Museum and Art Gallery and placed in store. No preparatory work on the material was possible until after September 1968 due to a museum staff vacancy, but by the end of that year a probable sauropod dinosaur identity had been established on the basis of several complete cervical vertebrae having been recovered from matrix. It was not until late 1970 however that a provisional identification of C. oxoniensis was published by curator Michael Jones following examination and corroboration by Prof. J S McIntosh of the Peabody Museum of Natural History Yale University

This determination was based on six cervical, two dorsal and three anterior caudal vertebrae, several chevrons and whilst still embedded in matrix, numerous rib fragments, and indications of parts of the pectoral and pelvic girdles and limb bones. It is one of the most complete specimens of a dinosaur ever found in the UK. Most of the best preserved vertebrae were displayed in a new geology gallery at Leicester Museum and Art Gallery in 1975. This included a visual representation of Cetiosaurus within its Jurassic environment, supported by other fossil material from the collections. With preparation of the most significant and well preserved components completed, no further work on the remainder or any possibility of a full reconstruction was feasible until the 1980s, culminating in the largely replica model first displayed in 1985 at Leicester Museum and Art Gallery. A comprehensive published review of all the prepared skeletal components followed in 2002

The specimen on display at Leicester Museum and Art Gallery is 15 m (49 ft) in length and has fourteen cervical vertebrae, ten dorsals, five sacrals and about fifty caudals. Only the more structurally sound parts of the dinosaur are on display, with the more-fragile parts in store. Much of what can be seen in the display is a representation (replica), and not the entire dinosaur.

=== Other species ===
In 1874, John Whitaker Hulke named Cetiosaurus humerocristatus, "with a crested humerus", based on specimen BMNH 44635, a humerus found that year at Sandsfoot near Weymouth in Dorset. In 2010, this was made a separate genus Duriatitan. This today is often considered a nomen dubium.

Ornithopsis leedsii was named in 1887 by John Hulke for a pelvis, vertebrae and ribs collected by Alfred Nicholson Leeds, an English farmer and amateur fossil collector who throughout his life compiled numerous collections of fossils from the Oxford Clay. It was described in more detail by Seeley in 1889, where he considered Ornithopsis hulkei (which had been described by Harry Seeley in 1870 based on vertebrae from the Early Cretaceous Wessex Formation of the Isle of Wight in southern England), C. oxoniensis and O. leedsii to all be in the same genus, bearing the name Cetiosaurus. But naturalist Richard Lydekker discussed with Seeley, before the publication of Seeley's 1889 paper, that Cetiosaurus and Ornithopsis were not the same taxon. Lydekker suggested that Wealden fossils (including O. hulkei) belonged to Ornithopsis and the Jurassic remains (including O. leedsii and C. oxoniensis) to Cetiosaurus. Lydekker in 1895 changed his mind and referred the species O. leedsii to Pelorosaurus (known already from the species P. brevis, once named Cetiosaurus brevis)—as P. leedsi—and referred the genus to Atlantosauridae. Arthur Smith Woodward supported Seeley's classification scheme in 1905, placing C. leedsi in Cetiosaurus, including within C. leedsi a partial sauropod skeleton collected from the Oxford Clay of Peterborough, England. In 1927, Friedrich von Huene assigned C. leedsi to the separate genus Cetiosauriscus. The holotype material of "C." leedsi, NHMUK R1988, consisting of a left and right ischium, is today considered indeterminate eusauropod remains, rendering the species a nomen dubium, while the sauropod skeleton described by Woodward from Peterborough in 1905 is now assigned to the valid separate species Cetiosauriscus stewarti.

In 1970 Rodney Steel renamed Cardiodon Owen 1841, based on a now lost tooth, into Cetiosaurus rugulosus, "the wrinkled one". If the species were cogeneric to Cetiosaurus, the name of the genus would, however, be Cardiodon as this name has priority. In 2003, Upchurch & Martin rejected the identity.

In addition to the thirteen species based on British material, three were named by French researchers. In 1874, Henri Émile Sauvage named Cetiosaurus rigauxi based on a vertebra found by Edouard Edmond Joseph Rigaux at Le Portel, west of Boulogne-sur-Mer, in layers dating from the Tithonian. In 1903, however, he was forced to conclude it represented a pliosaurid. In 1880, Sauvage named another species: Cetiosaurus philippsi.

In 1955, Albert-Félix de Lapparent named Cetiosaurus mogrebiensis based on three skeletons found in Morocco from the El Mers Formation dating to the Bathonian. The specific name refers to the Maghreb. This is today sometimes seen as a valid taxon, but one not belonging to Cetiosaurus.

=== The question of the type species ===
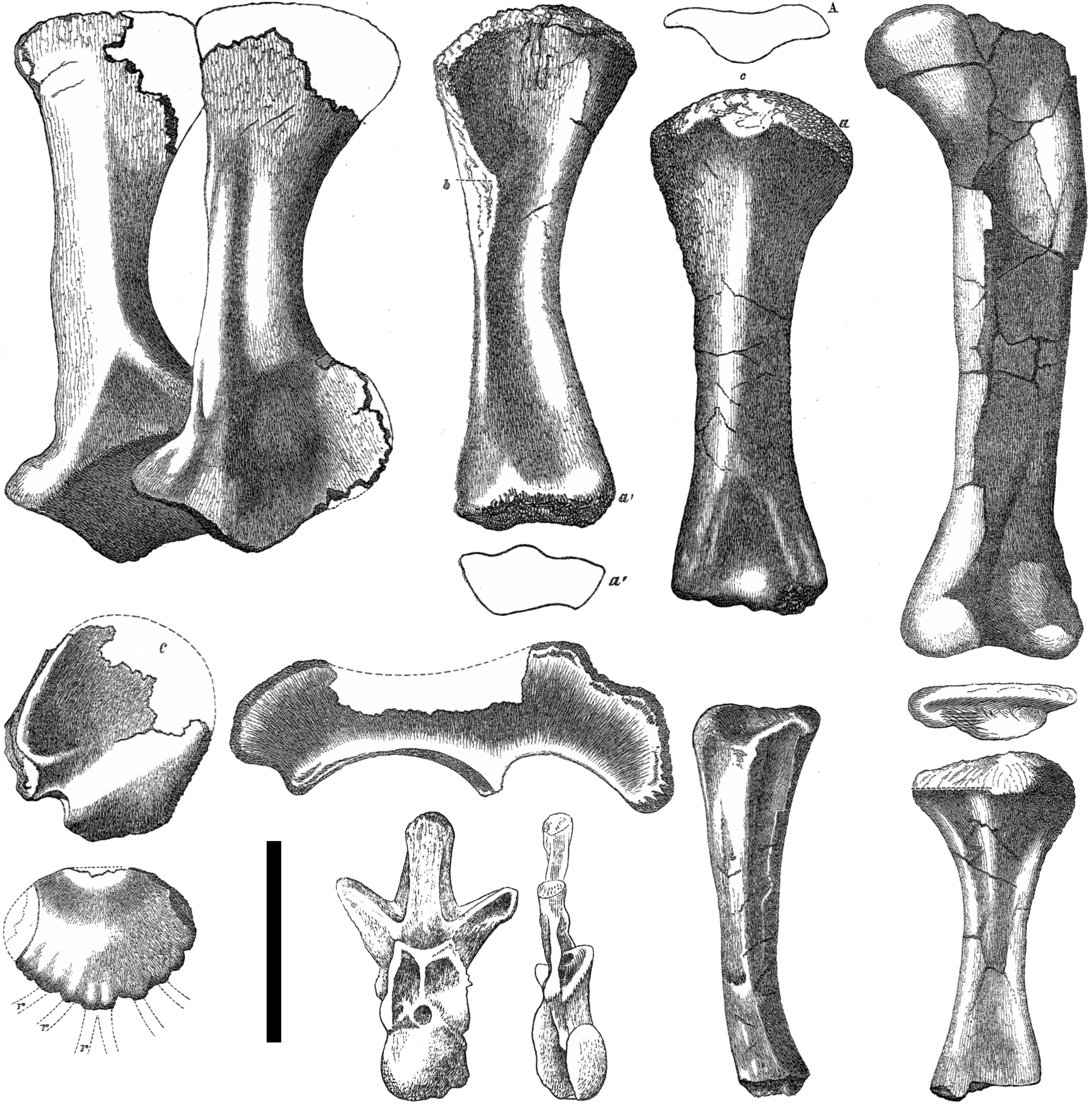
1871 illustration of material referred to C. oxoniensis

In principle for every genus a type species must be indicated to serve as its type in an ostensive definition. Traditionally, C. medius had been considered the type species of Cetiosaurus. In 1888 Richard Lydekker had formally assigned C. oxoniensis as the type species but by the modern rules of the ICZN one of the species named by the original author, in this case Owen, must be selected. In 2003, Paul Upchurch and John Martin determined that C. "hypoolithicus" and C. "epioolithicus" could not be used because they were nomina nuda. Of the four species named in Owen's second 1842 article, C. brevis, C. brachyurus, C. longus and C. medius, only C. brevis would not be a nomen dubium. This they interpreted as implying that C. brevis was the type species. This conclusion, if correct, would cause considerable taxonomic instability, because the genus Pelorosaurus had since been based on its fossils, and recognized as a totally different kind of sauropod. Therefore, Upchurch & Martin suggested to request the ICZN to change the type species into C. oxoniensis, the best known species from the Middle Jurassic, which the genus Cetiosaurus had generally come to be identified with.

However, in 2009, when their request was officially filed, Upchurch and Martin had changed their position. They acknowledged that being designated a nomen dubium does not prevent a species from having been made the type of a genus. Furthermore, they had identified a passage in the 1842 article in which Owen himself had already assigned C. medius as the type species: "it is principally on these bones [i.e. those of C. medius], with others subsequently discovered and in the collection of Mr. Kingdon, that the characters of the Cetiosaurus were first determined". Nevertheless, they still advocated a change in type because C. medius is known only from undiagnostic material. Its syntype series consists of eleven separate tail vertebrae, (specimina OUMNH J13693–13703), some sacral ribs with a foot bone (metatarsal, OUMNH J13704–13712), a hand bone (metacarpal, OUMNH J13748), and a claw (OUMNH J13721), probably from different fossil sites and different individuals.

The ICZN accepted the proposal to change the type species in 2014 (Opinion 2331), officially making C. oxoniensis the type species in place of the original C. medius. Making C. oxoniensis the type species of Cetiosaurus secured the name Cetiosaurus for the animal with which it has been traditionally associated.

In 2011, a chevron suggested to belong to the genus Cetiosaurus proper was reported from Ardennes in northeast France. This region was likely part of the same landmass as Cetiosaurus specimens known from Britain. Several fossil tracks discovered in 1997 and 2024 at two Oxfordshire, UK sites have been suggested to be Cetiosaurus footprints, though identification with a diplodocoid is also possible.

=== Valid Species ===
The complex naming history can be summarised in a list of Cetiosaurus species:

- Cetiosaurus oxoniensis Phillips, 1871: type species of Cetiosaurus

=== Doubtful species ===
- Cetiosaurus hypoolithicus Owen, 1841: nomen nudum
- Cetiosaurus epioolithicus Owen, 1841: nomen nudum
- Cetiosaurus brachyurus Owen, 1842: nomen dubium
- Cetiosaurus longus Owen, 1842: nomen dubium; = Cetiosauriscus longus (Owen, 1842) McIntosh, 1990
- Cetiosaurus medius Owen, 1842: nomen dubium
- Cetiosaurus giganteus Owen vide Huxley, 1870: nomen nudum
- Cetiosaurus philippsi Sauvage, 1880

=== Misassigned and reclassified species ===
- Cetiosaurus brevis Owen, 1842: non Cetiosaurus, = Cetiosaurus conybeari Melville, 1849; = Pelorosaurus conybearei (Melville, 1849) Mantell, 1850; = Pelorosaurus brevis (Owen, 1842) Huene, 1927
- Cetiosaurus glymptonensis Phillips, 1871: non Cetiosaurus; = Cetiosauriscus glymptonensis (Phillips, 1871) McIntosh, 1990, non Cetiosauriscus
- Cetiosaurus rigauxi Sauvage, 1874: non Cetiosaurus, pliosaurid
- Cetiosaurus humerocristatus Hulke, 1874: non Cetiosaurus; = Ornithopsis humerocristatus (Hulke, 1874) Lydekker, 1889; = Pelorosaurus humerocristatus (Hulke, 1874) Sauvage, 1897; = Duriatitan humerocristatus (Hulke, 1874) Barrett, Benson & Upchurch, 2010
- Cetiosaurus leedsi (Hulke, 1887) Woodward, 1905: nomen dubium; = Ornithopsis leedsii Hulke, 1887
- Cetiosaurus rugulosus (Owen, 1845) Steel, 1970: non Cetiosaurus, = Cardiodon Owen, 1841; = Cardiodon rugulosus Owen, 1845
- Cetiosaurus mogrebiensis de Lapparent, 1955: non Cetiosaurus

== Description ==
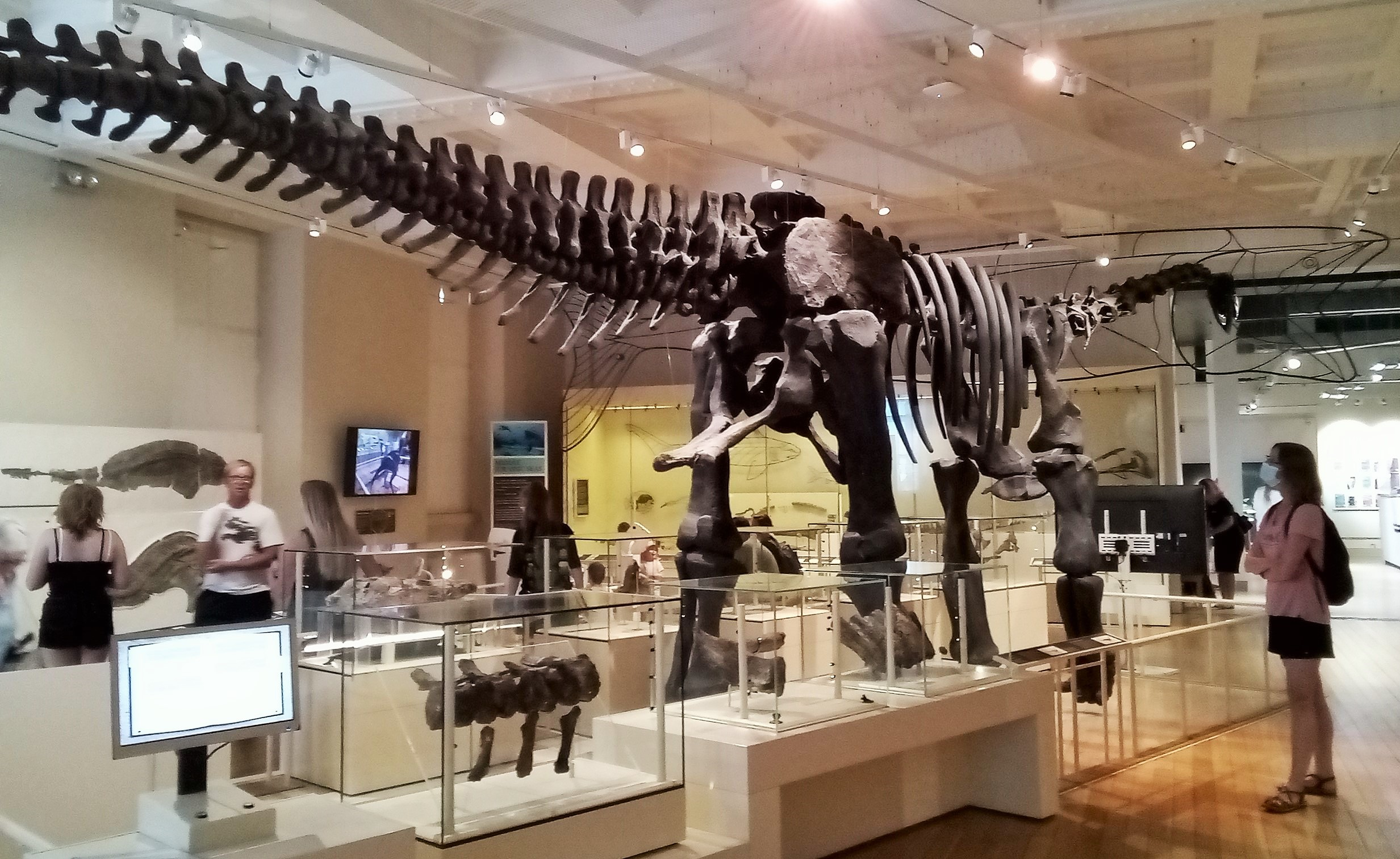
Hind view of the Rutland C. oxoniensis mount

Size comparison

Cetiosaurus, or specifically the neotype species C. oxoniensis, is known from relatively complete fossils. These include the three skeletons found by Phillips. One of these is a larger animal (catalogued as OUMNH J13605–13613, J13615–16, J13619–J13688 and J13899), which was chosen by Upchurch & Martin as the lectotype of the species; the second consists of limb bones of a smaller individual (OUMNH J13614) and the third skeleton represents the shoulder blade and hindlimb of a juvenile animal (OUMNNH J13617–8, J13780–1). The Rutland specimen, about 40% complete, increases considerably the number of known skeletal elements, especially in the neck. The skull is largely unknown, perhaps with the exception of the brain case represented by specimen OUMNH J13596. A single tooth crown, OUMNH J13597, has provisionally been referred to the species.

Cetiosaurus was, as any sauropod, a long-necked quadrupedal animal. In 2010, Gregory S. Paul estimated the body length at 16 metres (52 ft) and body mass at 11 tonnes (12 short tons). Its neck was moderately long; no longer than its body. The tail was considerably longer, consisting of at least forty caudal vertebrae. Its dorsal vertebrae, the bones along the back, had the original heavy build with limited air chambers, unlike the extremely hollowed-out bones of later sauropods like Brachiosaurus. Its forearm was as long as the upper arm, unlike most other sauropods, resulting in a forelimb equalling the hindlimb in length. Its thigh bone was approximately six feet long.

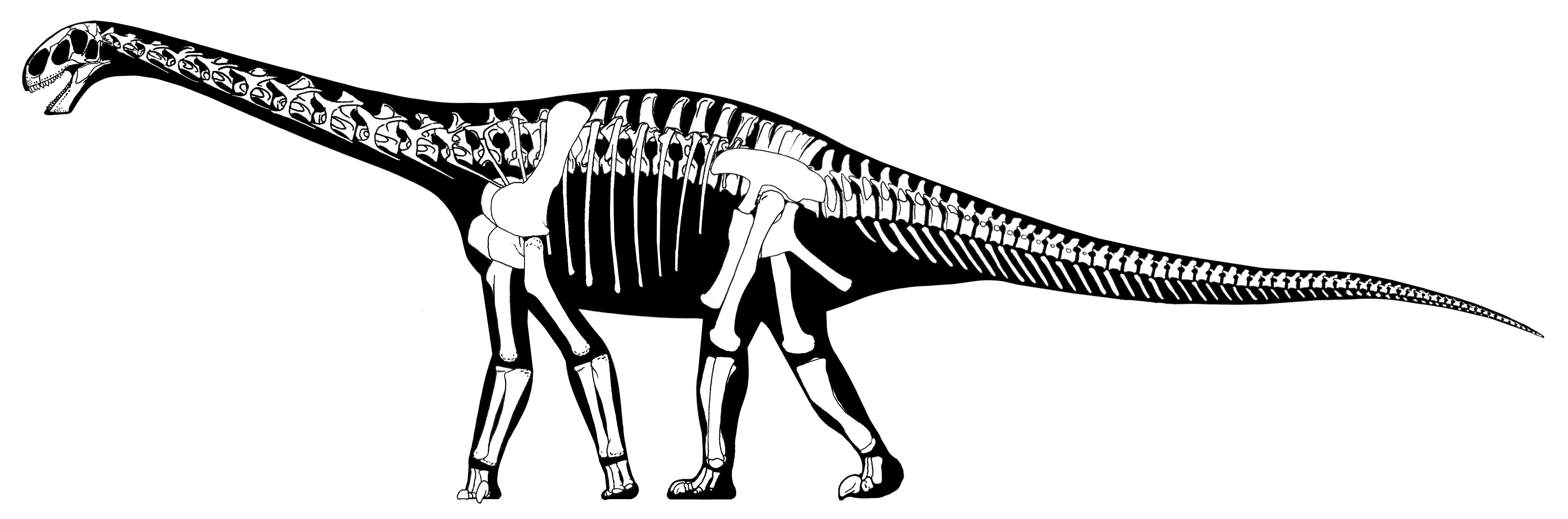
Skeletal drawing of C. oxoniensis

In his original descriptions, Owen was unable to indicate any differences between Cetiosaurus and other sauropods for the simple reason these latter were not yet discovered. Now that such relatives have been found, the uniqueness of Cetiosaurus oxoniensis and its status as a valid taxon must be proven by indicating its new derived traits or autapomorphies. In their 2003 revision of the genus, Upchurch & Martin identified five autapomorphies of C. oxoniensis. The rear neck vertebrae and the front back vertebrae have spines on their tops that are low, symmetrical and in the shape of a pyramid. With the spines of all back vertebrae a ridge is absent between the spine and the diapophysis, the top rib joint; it has been lost or perhaps fused with the ridge running between the spine and the postzygapophysis, the rear joint process. The vertebrae of the middle tail have a tongue-shaped process at the top of the front face of the vertebral body; this is an extension of the floor of the neural canal. The chevrons of the front tail vertebrae have shafts of which the lower ends are flattened from the front to the rear instead of transversely. The lower process of the ilium, to which the pubic bone was attached, features on the outer surface of its base a triangular depression.

Bones of Cetiosaurus
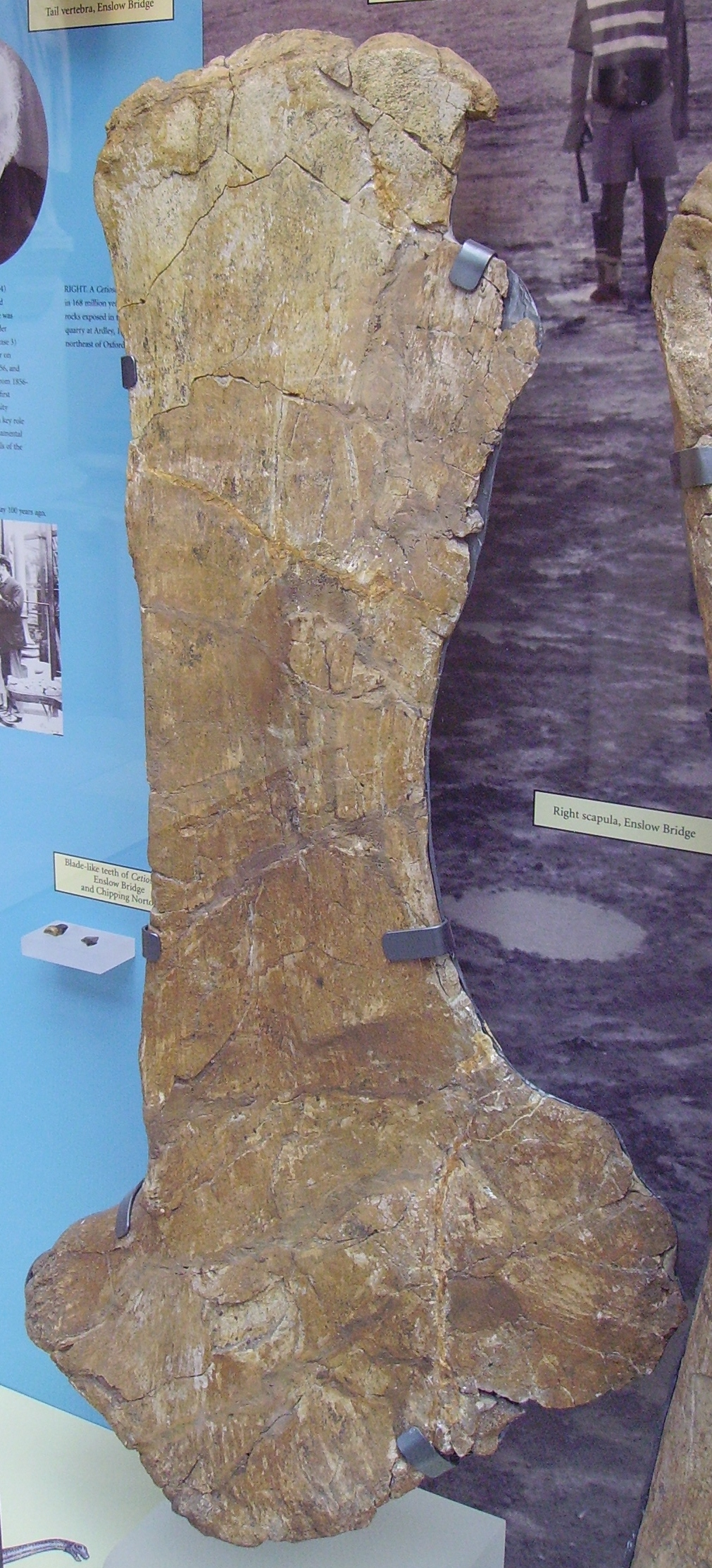
Right scapula of C. oxoniensis

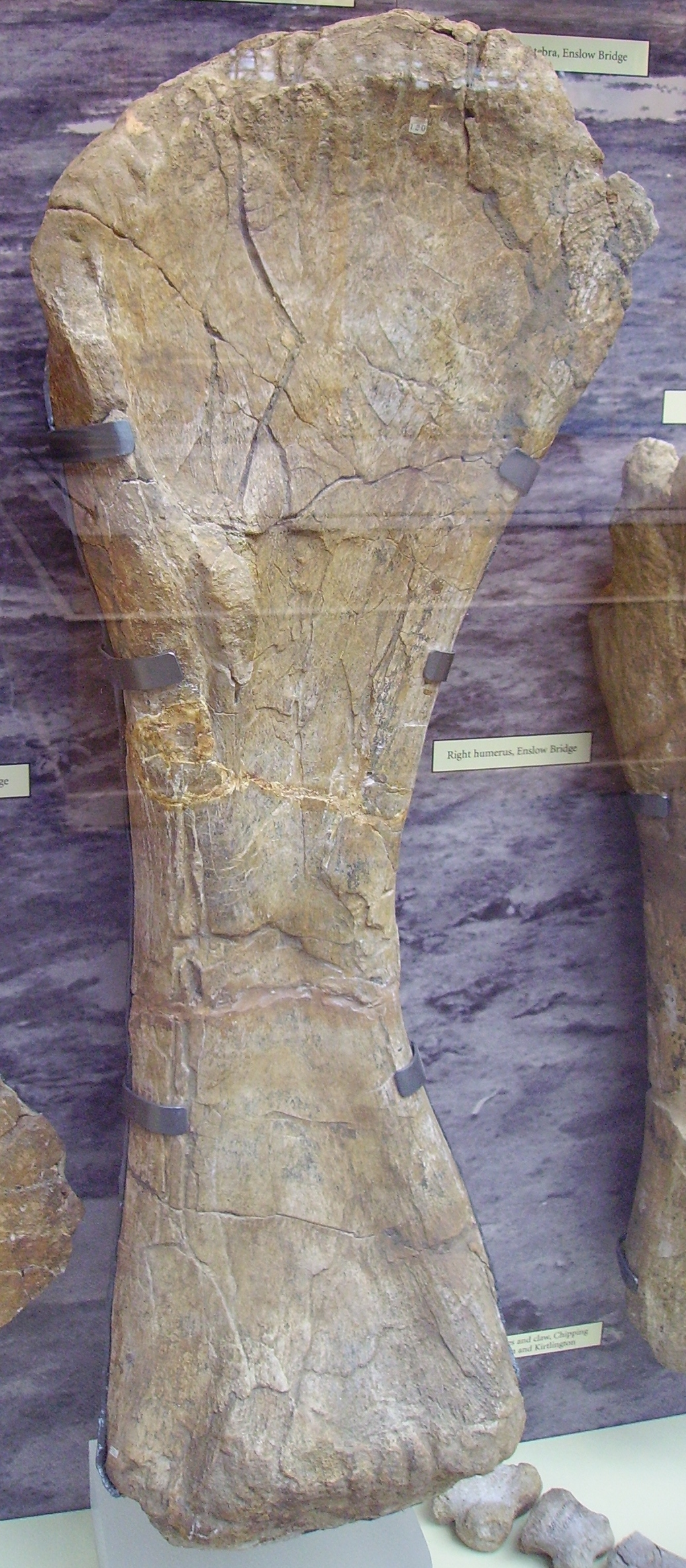
Right humerus of C. oxoniensis

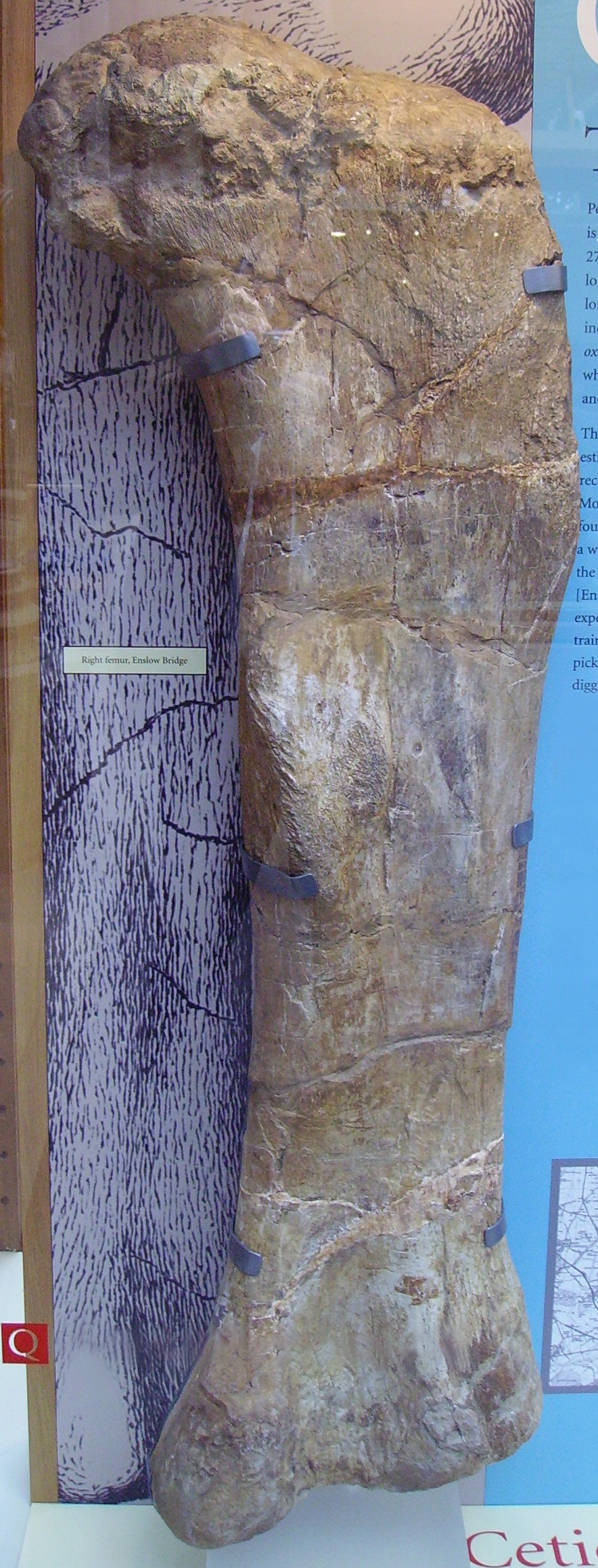
Right femur of C. oxoniensis

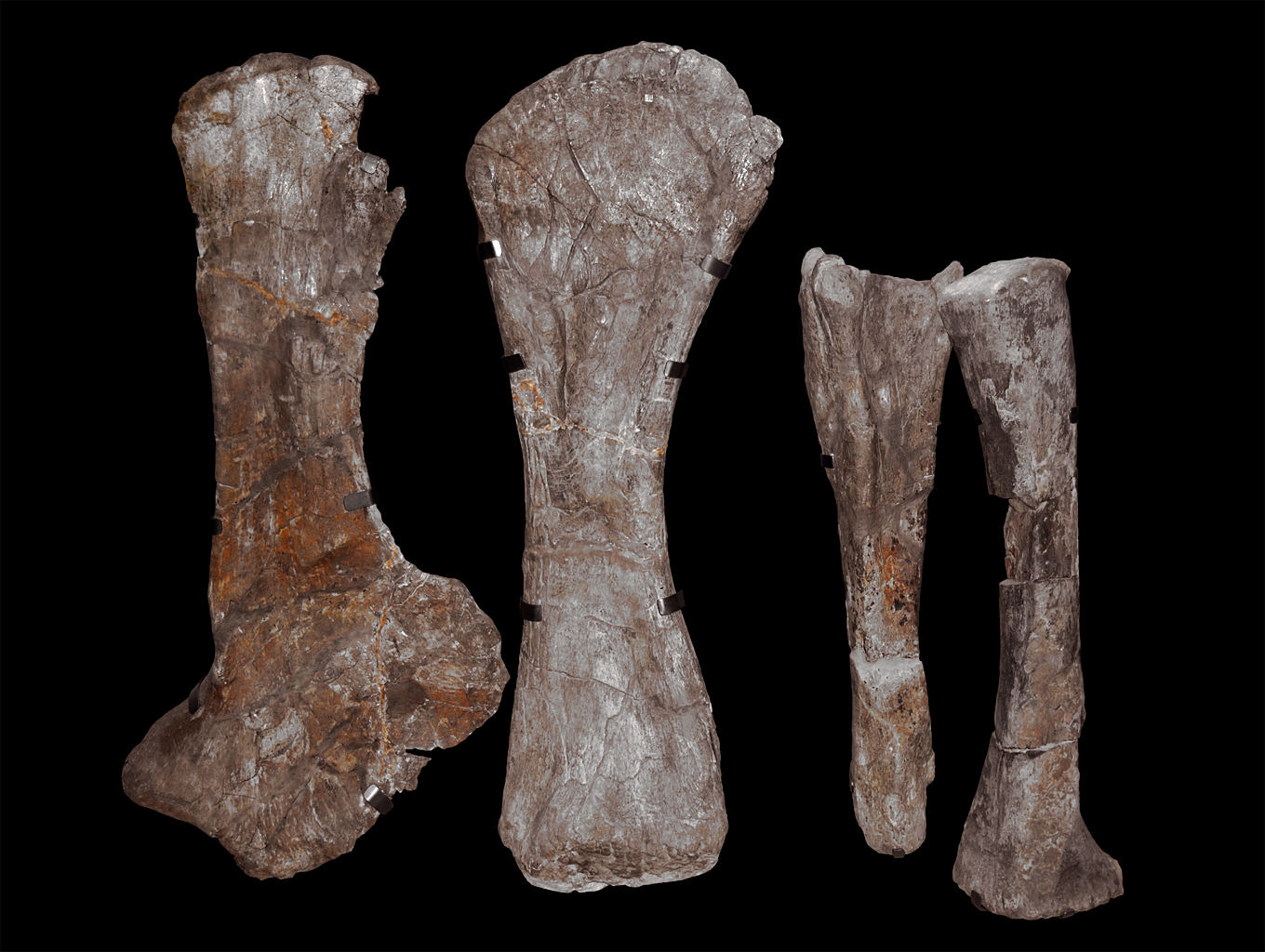
Images of the scapula, humerus, ulna & radius of Cetiosaurus

== Classification and phylogeny ==
Owen initially was unsure about the precise relationships of Cetiosaurus. He understood it was a reptile and most researchers at the time accordingly assigned it to the Sauria. However, he at first did not recognise its dinosaurian nature; when in 1842 he named the Dinosauria, Cetiosaurus was not included. This was influenced by the preconception that such a large animal must have been sea-dwelling. Owen assumed crocodylian affinities. In the early 1850s, Gideon Mantell began to suspect that Cetiosaurus was a land animal as a result of his studies of Pelorosaurus. This idea, however, was only slowly accepted by other scientists. In 1859 Owen still classified Cetiosaurus in the Crocodylia. In 1861, Owen concentrated all such forms in a group of their own: the Opisthocoelia. In 1869 Thomas Huxley stated explicitly that Cetiosaurus was a dinosaur.

In 1888 Lydekker assigned Cetiosaurus to its own family: the Cetiosauridae. For a long time this functioned as a large ill-defined family of typically "primitive" sauropods. Today, however, many considerably more basal sauropods than Cetiosaurus are known. Modern exact cladistic research has not resulted in a single clear outcome about the position of Cetiosaurus oxoniensis in the sauropod tree. Sometimes a Cetiosauridae was recovered, a clade uniting Cetiosaurus oxoniensis with species as the Indian Barapasaurus, the South American Patagosaurus or the African Chebsaurus. Other studies indicate that the traditional Cetiosauridae were paraphyletic and recover Cetiosaurus oxoniensis in a basal position in the Eusauropoda, basal in the Neosauropoda or just outside of this clade.

Cladogram of Sauropoda after Ren and colleagues, 2023, showing the position of Cetiosaurus:

- Sauropoda
  - - Vulcanodon
    - Tazoudasaurus
  - Eusauropoda
    - Shunosaurus
    - - Barapasaurus
      - - - - Patagosaurus
            - Cetiosaurus
          - - Mamenchisauridae
            - - Turiasauria
              - - Jobaria
                - Neosauropoda
                  - - Atlasaurus
                    - Diplodocoidea
                      - Haplocanthosaurus
                      - - Rebbachisauridae
                        - - Diplodocidae
                          - Dicraeosauridae
                  - Macronaria
                    - Dashanpusaurus
                    - - Camarasaurus
                      - - - Lourinhasaurus
                          - - Bellusaurus
                            - - Janenschia
                              - Aragosaurus
                        - - Europasaurus
                          - - - Euhelopus
                              - Galvesaurus
                            - - Tehuelchesaurus
                              - Titanosauriformes
                                - Brachiosauridae
                                - Somphospondyli (including Titanosauria)

Cladogram after Gomez et al. (2024):

- Sauropoda
  - Antetonitrus
  - - Ingentia
    - Lessemsaurus
  - - Ledumahadi
    - Pulanesaura
    - - - Gongxianosaurus
        - Amygdalodon
        - NHMUK PVR 36834
      - - Archaeodontosaurus
        - Volkheimeria
        - Sanpasaurus
        - Vulcanodon
        - Tazoudasaurus
        - Eusauropoda
          - Shunosaurus
          - - Barapasaurus
            - - - Patagosaurus
                - - Bagualia
                  - - Nebulasaurus
                    - Spinophorosaurus
              - - Tonganosaurus
                - - Mamenchisauridae
                  - - Cetiosaurus
                    - - Turiasauria
                      - - Jobaria
                        - Neosauropoda

== Ecology ==
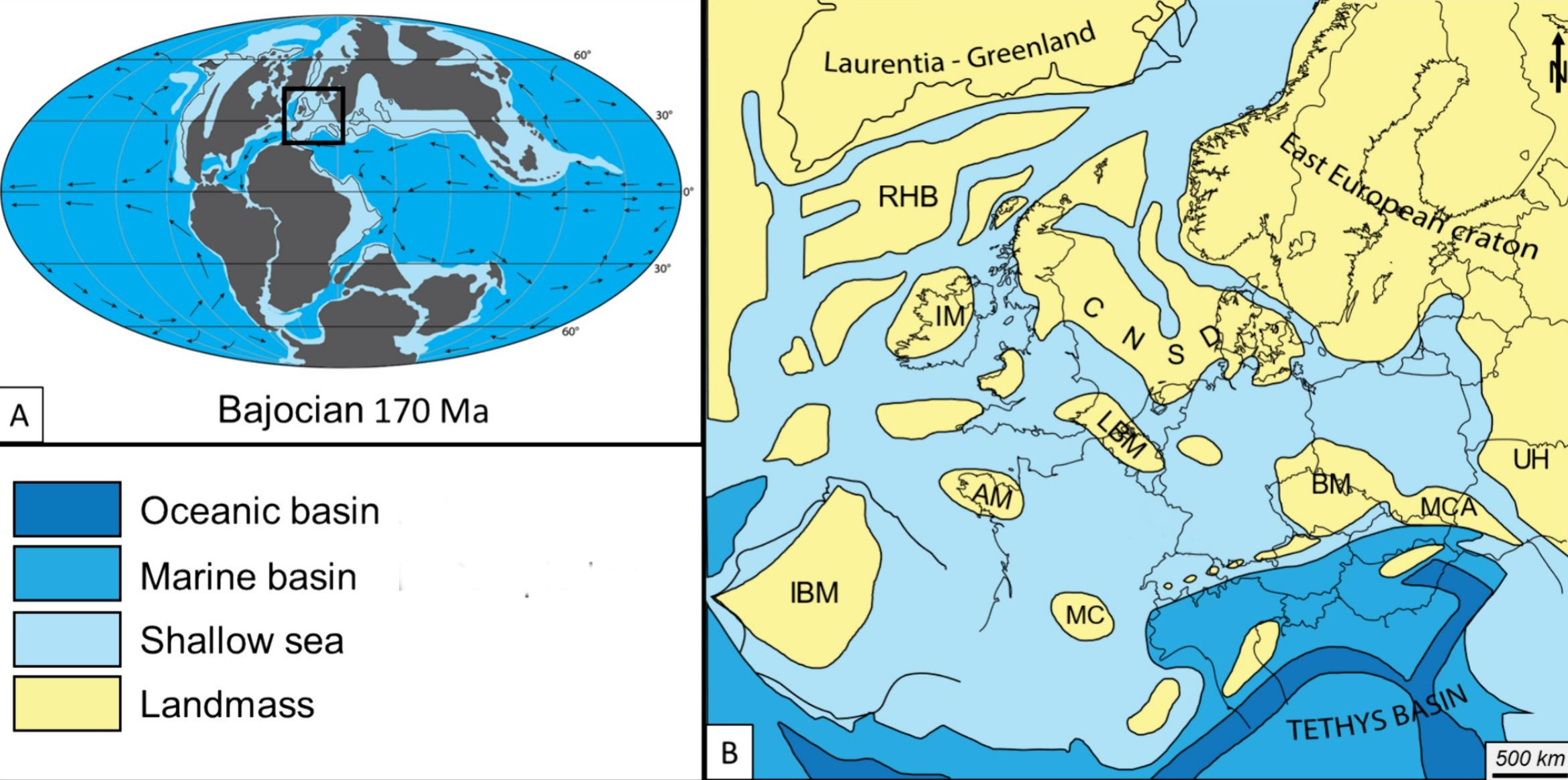
Map of Europe during the Bajocian period. The London–Brabant Massif is labelled "LBM".

During the Middle Jurassic when Cetiosaurus lived, Europe was an archipelago surrounded by shallow seas. Cetiosaurus inhabited the London–Brabant Massif, a tectonic high that during this period formed an island landmass including parts of southern Britain and adjacent areas of northern France, the Netherlands, Belgium and western Germany, suggested to be comparable in size to Cuba with an area of around 100,000 square kilometres (39,000 sq mi). It has been questioned why the dinosaurs of the island did not experience insular dwarfism, as would be expected for an island of this size. A possible explanation for this is that the island remained ecologically connected to the much larger landmass comprising northern Britain (the Scottish Massif), the Fennoscandian Shield and the now submerged region in the North Sea between them.

Other dinosaurs roughly contemporaneous to Cetiosaurus in the Bajocian-Bathonian of Britain include the large theropod dinosaurs Megalosaurus, Magnosaurus and Duriavenator (all belonging to Megalosauridae), the small tyrannosauroid Proceratosaurus and paravians (suggested to include dromaeosaurs and troodontids), and possible therizinosaurs, as well as indeterminate heterodontosaurids, stegosaurs and ankylosaurs.

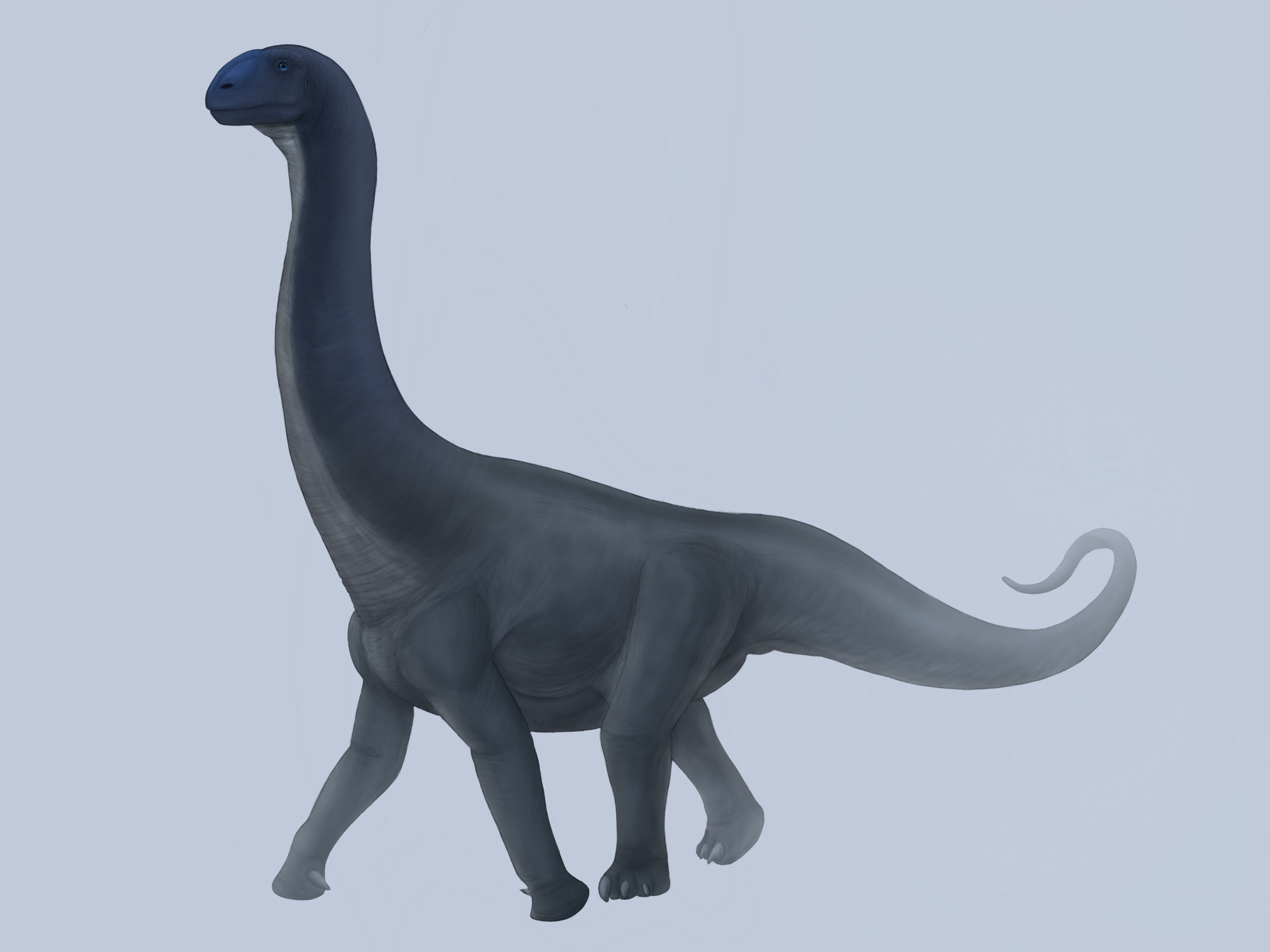
Life restoration of C. oxoniensis based on the Rutland specimen

The environment in which Cetiosaurus lived was floodplain and open woodland. Paul considered Cetiosaurus a feeding generalist, eating at both a low and a medium-high level, in view of its moderately long neck and limb proportions. During the Bathonian the London-Brabant Massif is thought to have had a seasonally dry climate, with the flora found in the Taynton Limestone Formation of Oxfordshire, likely representing the nearshore vegetation, dominated by araucarian and cheirolepidiacean conifers, the probable conifer Pelourdea, and bennettitaleans, with other plants including cycads (Ctenis), ferns (Phlebopteris, Coniopteris), Caytoniales, the living genus Ginkgo, and the seed ferns Pachypteris and Komlopteris.
