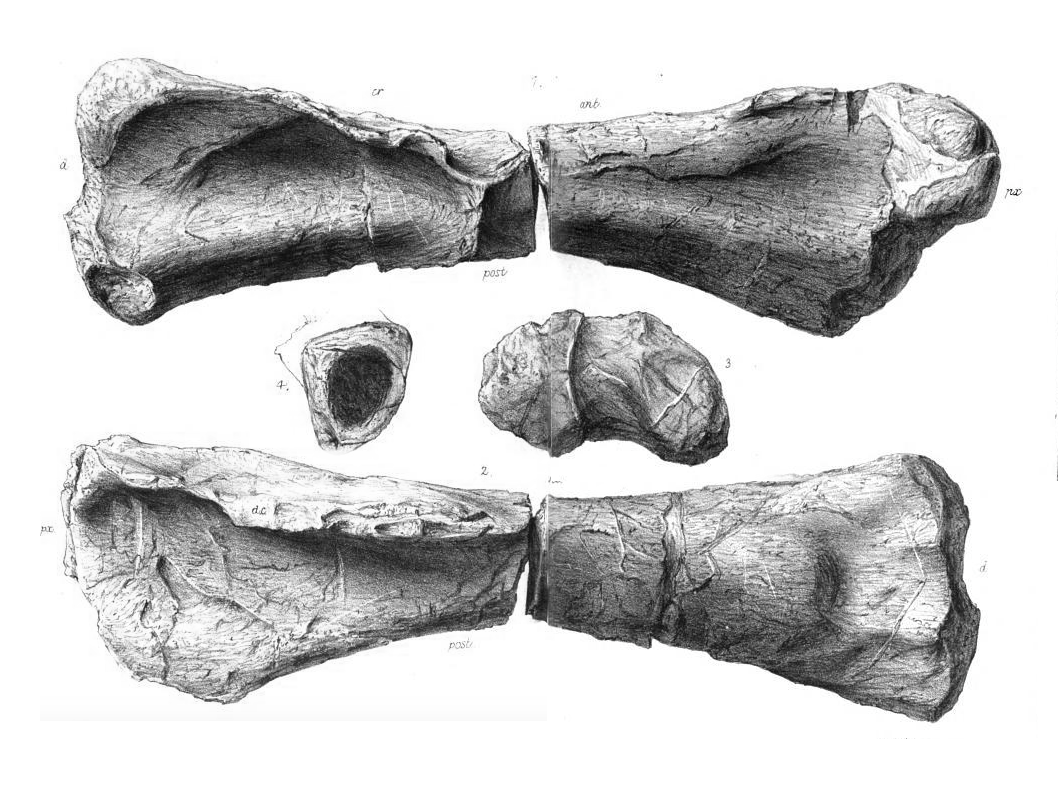
- Holotype humerus seen from two different angles

Scientific classification
- Kingdom: Animalia
- Phylum: Chordata
- Class: Reptilia
- Clade: Dinosauria
- Clade: Saurischia
- Clade: †Sauropodomorpha
- Clade: †Sauropoda
- Clade: †Macronaria
- Clade: †Titanosauriformes
- Genus: †Duriatitan; Barrett, Benson & Upchurch, 2010
- Species: †D. humerocristatus

Binomial name
- †Duriatitan humerocristatus (Hulke, 1874 [originally Cetiosaurus])

Synonyms
- Ceteosaurus humero-cristatus Hulke, 1874; Cetiosaurus humeroctistatus (Hulke, 1874); Pelorosaurus humerocristatus (Hulke, 1874); Ornithopsis humerocristatus (Hulke, 1874)

= Duriatitan =

Duriatitan Temporal range: Late Jurassic, 150 Ma

Extinct genus of dinosaurs

Duriatitan is a genus of titanosauriform sauropod dinosaur that lived in the Late Jurassic in what is now England. The holotype specimen of Duriatitan, BMNH 44635, is a partial left upper arm bone which was found by R.I. Smith near Sandsfoot, Weymouth in the lower Kimmeridge Clay from Dorset. The type species, D. humerocristatus, was described in 1874 by John Hulke as a species of Cetiosaurus and was noted as being similar to that of Gigantosaurus. The specific name refers to the deltopectoral crest, crista, on the upper arm bone, humerus. The specimen was assigned to its own genus by Paul M. Barrett, Roger B.J. Benson and Paul Upchurch in 2010. The generic name is derived from the Latin name for Dorset, Duria, and Greek Titan. Thomas Holtz estimated its length at 25 meters (82 ft).

Gigantosaurus megalonyx was once synonymised with Duriatitan while D. humerocristatus was still a species of Ornithopsis.
