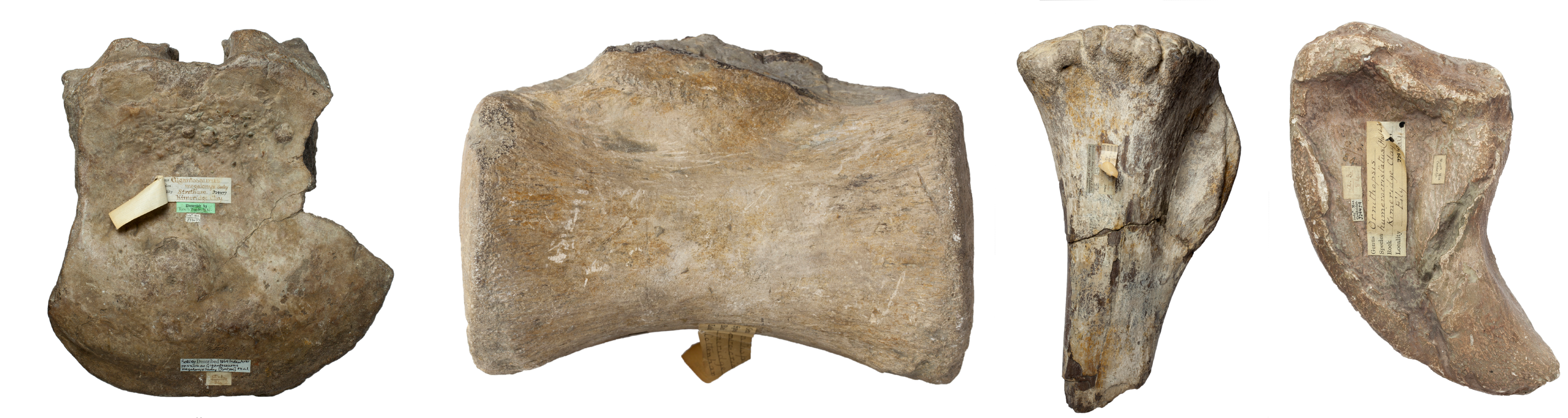
- Part of the syntype series of G. megalonyx (from left to right: CAMSM J.29477, CAMSM J.29478, CAMSM J.29479 and CAMSM J.29483)

Scientific classification
- Kingdom: Animalia
- Phylum: Chordata
- Class: Reptilia
- Clade: Dinosauria
- Clade: Saurischia
- Clade: †Sauropodomorpha
- Clade: †Sauropoda
- Genus: †Gigantosaurus; Seeley, 1869
- Species: †G. megalonyx

Binomial name
- †Gigantosaurus megalonyx Seeley, 1869

= Gigantosaurus =

Gigantosaurus Temporal range: Kimmeridgian

Extinct genus of dinosaurs

Gigantosaurus (from Ancient Greek γίγας (gígas) 'giant' and σαυρος (sauros) 'lizard') is a dubious genus of sauropod dinosaur from the Late Jurassic Kimmeridge Clay Formation of England. The type species, Gigantosaurus megalonyx, was named and described by Harry Govier Seeley in 1869.

== History ==
Its syntype series consists of several separately discovered sauropod bones found in Cambridgeshire in 1862, including two caudal (tail) vertebrae (CAMSM J.29477 and CAMSM J.29478), the distal end of a tibia (CAMSM J.29483), a cast of the right radius (CAMSM J.29482), a cast of phalanx (CAMSM J.29479) and an osteoderm (CAMSM J.29481).

It was synonymised to Ornithopsis humerocristatus by Richard Lydekker in 1888 and to Pelorosaurus by Friedrich von Huene in 1909. Today it is considered a nomen dubium.

In 1908, because of these references, Eberhard Fraas incorrectly assumed that the name was available for other species, so he used it, despite the other uses, for African material totally unrelated to the British finds. As a result, the name Gigantosaurus factored into the convoluted taxonomic history of the dinosaurs Barosaurus, Tornieria, and Janenschia.

== Classification ==
In 2022, Molina-Pérez and Larramendi suggested that Gigantosaurus was a mamenchisaurid.
