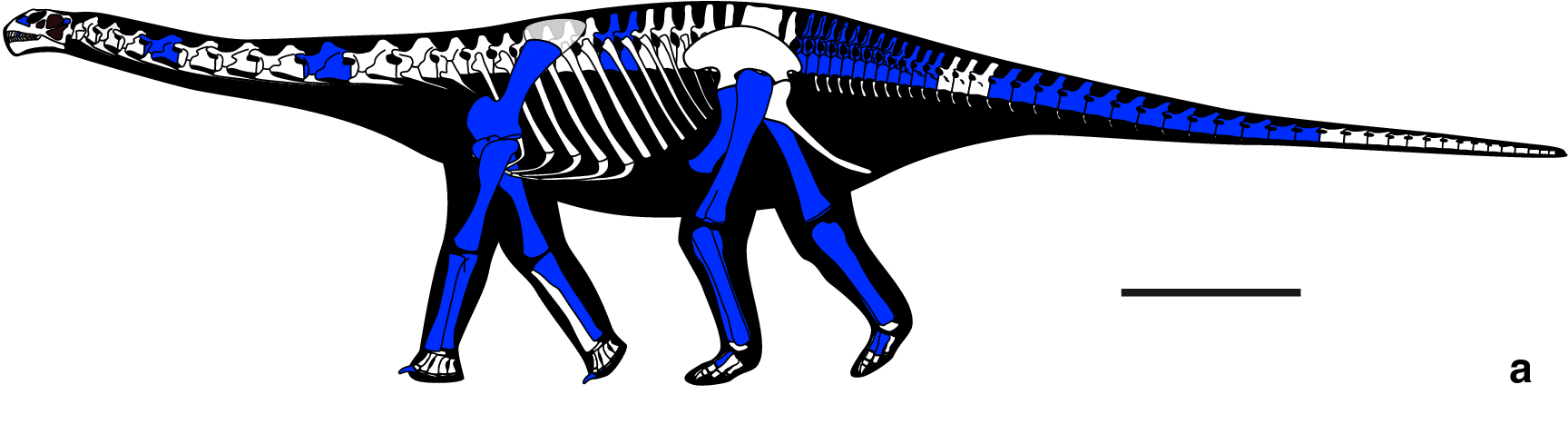
- Amanzia skeletal reconstruction, showing known material in blue
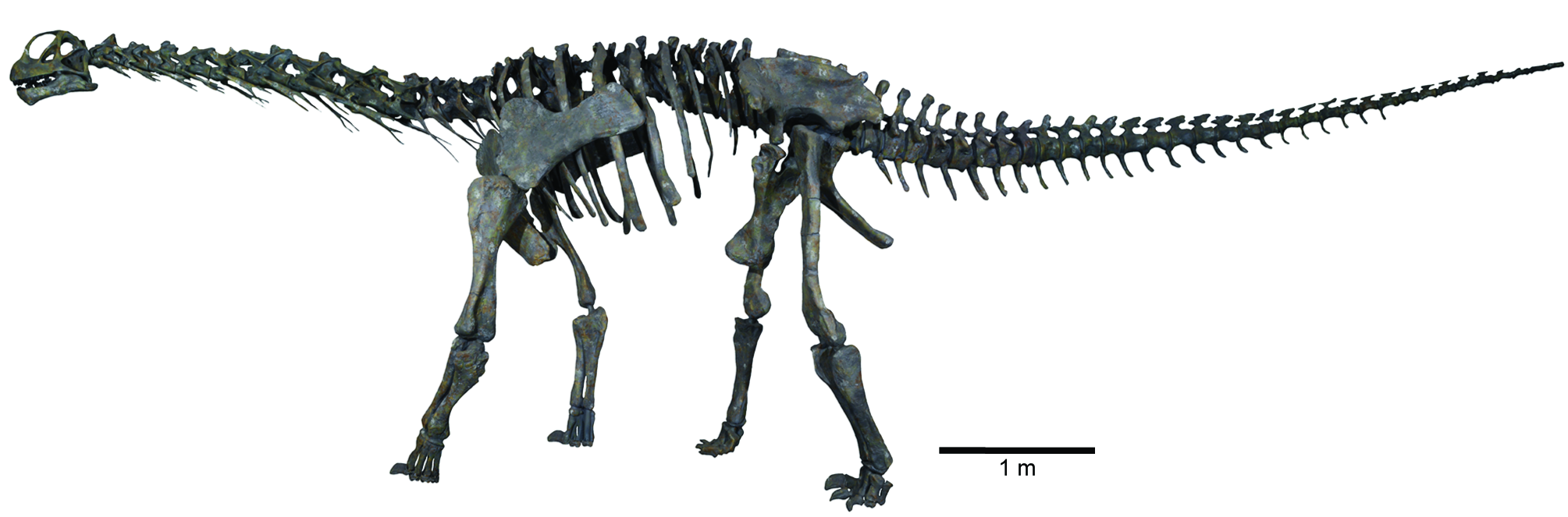
- Moabosaurus, with an incorrect Camarasaurus-like head

Scientific classification
- Kingdom: Animalia
- Phylum: Chordata
- Class: Reptilia
- Clade: Dinosauria
- Clade: Saurischia
- Clade: †Sauropodomorpha
- Clade: †Sauropoda
- Clade: †Eusauropoda
- Clade: †Turiasauria; Royo-Torres et al., 2006

Genera
- †Amanzia; †Cardiodon; †Losillasaurus; †Mierasaurus; †Moabosaurus; †Narindasaurus; †Neosodon; †Oplosaurus; †Tendaguria; †Turiasaurus; †Zby

Synonyms
- Turiasauridae

= Turiasauria =

Turiasaurs Temporal range: Middle Jurassic - Early Cretaceous, 168–125 Ma Possible Pliensbachian record

Extinct clade of dinosaurs

Turiasauria is an unranked clade of eusauropod dinosaurs known from Middle Jurassic to Early Cretaceous deposits in Europe, North America, and Africa.

== Description ==
Turiasauria was originally erected by Royo-Torres et al. (2006) to include Turiasaurus, Galvesaurus and Losillasaurus, all of which hail from the Villar del Arzobispo Formation (Tithonian-Berriasian) of Spain. Turiasuria was defined by the authors as "all Eusauropoda closer to Turiasaurus riodevensis than to Saltasaurus loricatus". Cladistic analysis (Royo-Torres et al., 2006; 1927) of 309 characters and 33 taxa suggests that the turiasaurians lie outside the Neosauropoda and form a monophyletic group. The clade is diagnosed by the presence of vertical neural spines, posterior centroparapohyseal laminae on the dorsal vertebrae, the absence of pre- and postspinal laminae on the dorsal vertebrae, the absence of a scapular acromial crest, the presence of a prominent humeral deltopectoral crest, medial deflection of the proximal end of the humerus, and a distinct vertical ridge on the caudal side of the distal half of the ulna.

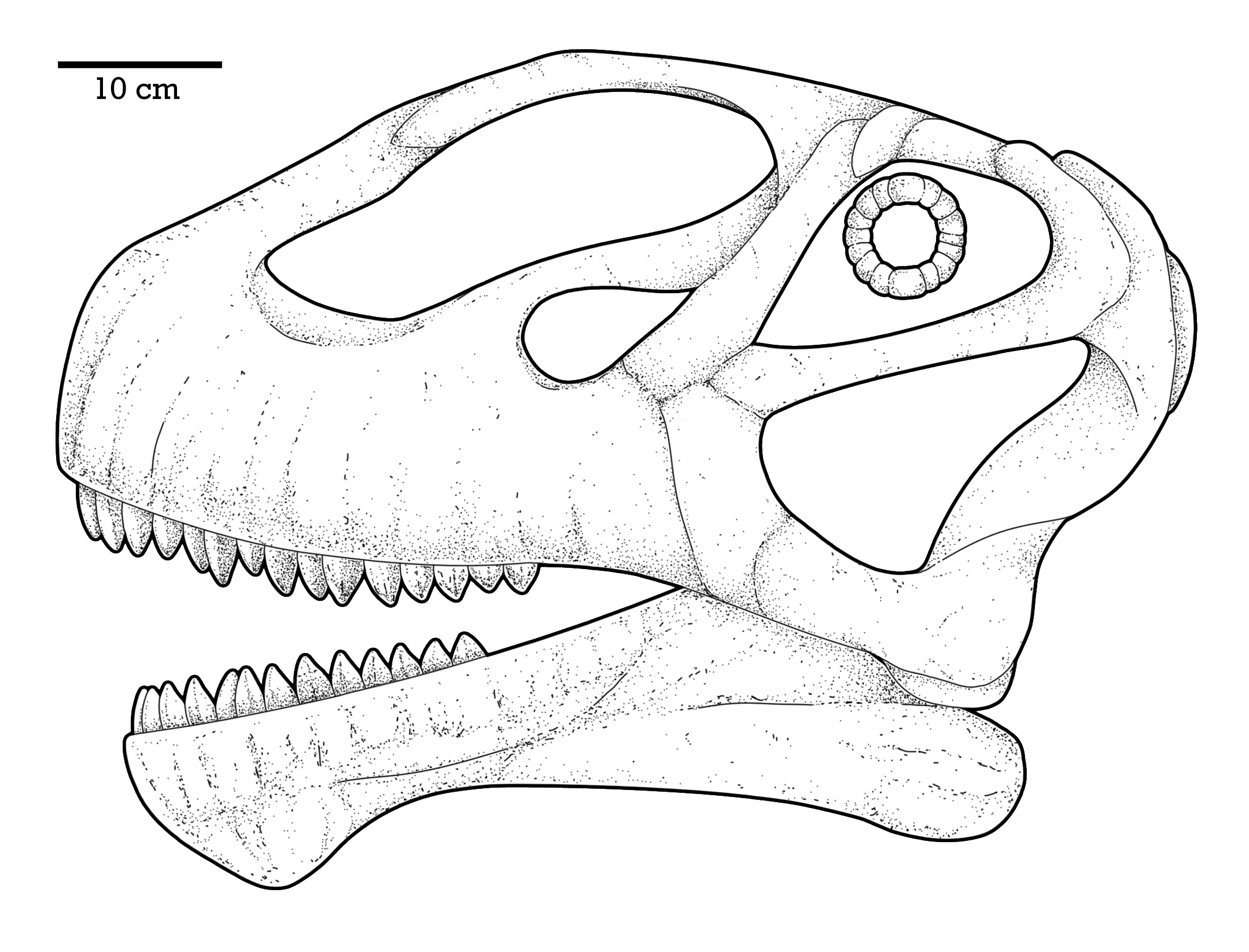
Mierasaurus skull

== Paleobiogeography ==
Turiasaurs were initially considered confined to Europe, with Turiasaurus from Spain and Zby from Portugal, and the tooth taxa Cardiodon, Neosodon, and Oplosaurus were referred to the clade, but additional members were found in North America and Africa. Heart-shaped teeth are considered a synapomorphy of the turiasauria. Recently a heart shaped tooth found from the Jaisalmer Formation confirmed the presence of this clade in India during the Middle Jurassic (Bathonian). Together with the Narindasaurus from the Bathonian of Madagascar, these are the oldest records of the group. It is therefore suggested that Turiasauria might have originated in Gondwana during the Middle Jurassic. A tooth discovered in the Lower Pliensbachian (Lower Jurassic) Hasle Formation of Bornholm, NHMD 1185136, was also referred to the family, being, if truly a member, 17 My older than any previously known turiasaur.

North American Mierasaurus and Moabosaurus from the Early Cretaceous are also considered to be turiasaurs. Remains of a very large species of turiasaur, not yet formally identified, have recently been unearthed from the earliest Cretaceous (Berriasian) aged Angeac-Charente bonebed in western France. Indeterminate turiasaur material, consisting of a single vertebra, has been described from an unknown locality in the Early Cretaceous Wealden Group of England.

== Classification ==
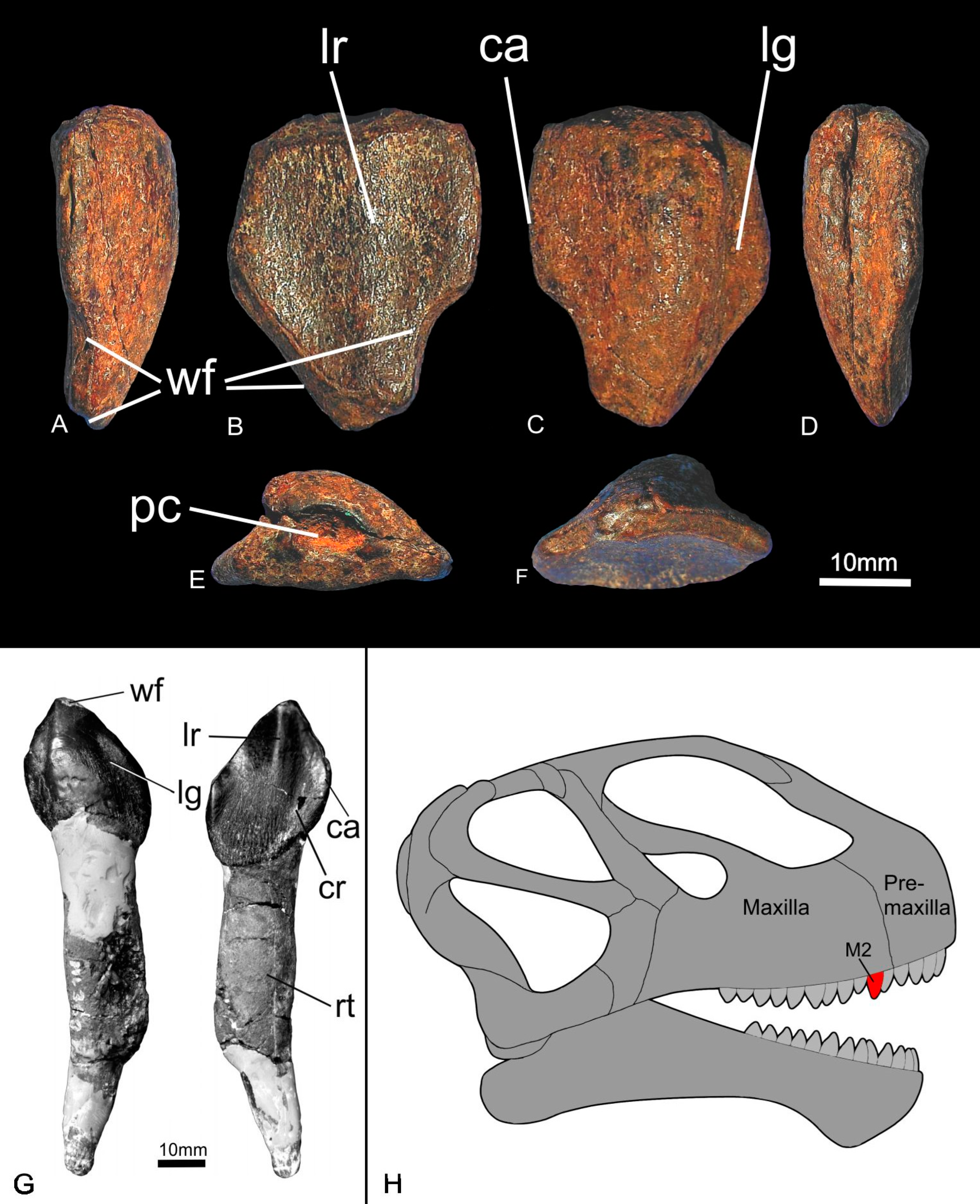
Tooth from the Hasle Formation of Bornholm that may represent the oldest know member of the group

Turiasauria is classified as a group of the clade Eusauropoda, more derived than basal sauropods such as Vulcanodon, but outside of the advanced sauropod clade Neosauropoda.

Cladogram of Sauropoda after Holwerda et al. 2021, showing the position of Turiasauria within Eusauropoda:

- Sauropoda
  - - Vulcanodon
    - Tazoudasaurus
  - - - Barapasaurus
      - - Spinophorosaurus
        - Volkheimeria
    - Eusauropoda
      - Shunosaurus
      - - Cetiosauridae
          - Cetiosaurus oxoniensis
          - - Patagosaurus
            - Cetiosaurus Rutland specimen
        - - Mamenchisauridae
            - Omeisaurus
            - Mamenchisaurus
          - - Turiasauria
            - - Jobaria
              - Neosauropoda

Turiasaurus demonstrates that the evolution of enormous body size was not restricted to neosauropod clades such as the Diplodocidae and Titanosauria, but developed independently at least once in a lineage of more basal sauropods, the turiasaurians.

A 2009 thesis published by José Barco proposed that neither Galvesaurus nor Losillasaurus were turiasaurians. Later, a master thesis by Francisco Gascó (2009) and Royo-Torres et al. (2009) reaffirmed the validity of Turiasauria.

== Sources ==
- Barco, J. L., Canudo, J. L., Cuenca-Bescós, G. & Ruíz-Omeñaca, J. I., (2005): Un nuevo dinosaurio saurópodo, Galvesaurus herreroi gen. nov., sp. nov., del tránsito Jurásico-Cretácico en Galve (Teruel, NE de España). Naturaleza Aragonesa: Vol. 15, pp 4–17
- Casanovas, M. L.; Santafe, J. V.; Sanz, J. L. (2001). "Losillasaurus giganteus, un nuevo saurópodo del tránsito Jurásico-Cretácico de la Cuenca de "Los Serranos" (Valencia, España)". Paleontologia i Evolució (32–33): 99–122.
- P. D. Mannion, P. Upchurch, D. Schwarz, O. Wings (2019). "Taxonomic affinities of the putative titanosaurs from the Late Jurassic Tendaguru Formation of Tanzania: phylogenetic and biogeographic implications for eusauropod dinosaur evolution". Zoological Journal of the Linnean Society. 185 (3): 784–909. doi:10.1093/zoolinnean/zly068. hdl:10044/1/64080.
