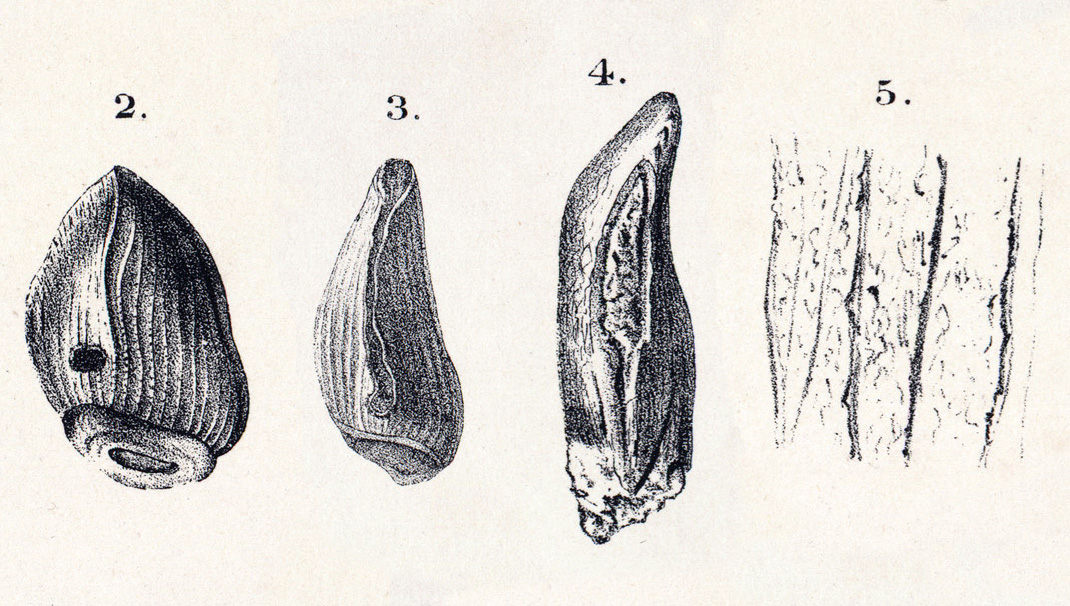
- Holotype tooth seen from two different angles (2–3), another tooth (4) and a close-up of the surface of the tooth (5)

Scientific classification
- Kingdom: Animalia
- Phylum: Chordata
- Class: Reptilia
- Clade: Dinosauria
- Clade: Saurischia
- Clade: †Sauropodomorpha
- Clade: †Sauropoda
- Clade: †Turiasauria
- Genus: †Cardiodon; Owen, 1841
- Species: †C. rugulosus

Binomial name
- †Cardiodon rugulosus Owen, 1844

Synonyms
- Cetiosaurus rugulosus Steel, 1970

= Cardiodon =

Cardiodon Temporal range: late Bathonian ~167 Ma

Extinct genus of dinosaurs

Cardiodon (meaning "heart tooth", in reference to the shape) was a herbivorous genus of sauropod dinosaur, based on a tooth from the Middle Jurassic (late Bathonian) Forest Marble Formation of Wiltshire, England. Historically, it is very obscure and usually referred to Cetiosaurus, but recent analyses suggest that it is a distinct genus, and possibly related to Turiasaurus. Cardiodon was the first sauropod genus named.

== History and taxonomy ==
Richard Owen named the genus for a now-lost tooth, part of the collection of naturalist Joseph Chaning Pearce, found near Bradford-on-Avon, but did not assign it a specific name at the time. The generic name is derived from Greek καρδία, kardia, "heart", and ὀδών, odon, "tooth", in reference to its heart-shaped profile. A few years later, in 1844, he added the specific name rugulosus, meaning "wrinkled" in Latin. Cardiodon was the first sauropod given a formal name to, though Owen was at the time completely unaware of the sauropod nature of the find.

Within a few decades, he and others were viewing Cardiodon as a possible synonym of his most well-known sauropod genus, Cetiosaurus. Richard Lydekker formalized this view in a roundabout way in 1890, by assigning Cetiosaurus oxoniensis to Cardiodon on the basis of teeth from Oxfordshire associated with a skeleton of C. oxoniensis. He also added a second tooth (BMNH R1527) from the Great Oolite near Cirencester, Gloucestershire. More typically, Cardiodon has been assigned to Cetiosaurus, sometimes as a separate species Cetiosaurus rugulosus, in spite of its priority.

In 2003, Paul Upchurch and John Martin, reviewing Cetiosaurus, found that there is little evidence to assign the C. oxoniensis teeth to the skeleton, and the "C. oxoniensis" teeth differ from the Cardiodon teeth (Cardiodon teeth are convex facing the tongue); therefore, they supported Cardiodon being retained as its own genus. Upchurch et al. (2004) repeated this assessment, and found that though the teeth have no known autapomorphies, they are those of a eusauropod. More recently, Royo-Torres et al. (2006), in their description of Turiasaurus, pointed out Cardiodon as a possible relative to their new, giant sauropod, placing it in the Turiasauria. Earlier, Cardiodon had been usually assigned to the Cetiosauridae or a Cardiodontidae of its own.

== Description ==
The original tooth shows, as far as can be deduced from the surviving illustrations, the rare combination of being spatulate and having a convex inner side, though the convexity is slight. Its crown is short and wide, slightly curving to the inside. The outer side is strongly convexly curved from the front to the rear. On this side a shallow groove is present, running parallel to the rear edge. The crown tapers towards its tip. The edges have no denticles. The enamel shows the little wrinkles to which the specific name refers.

== Paleobiology ==
As a sauropod, Cardiodon would have been a large, quadrupedal herbivore, but because of the scanty remains, much more cannot be said.
