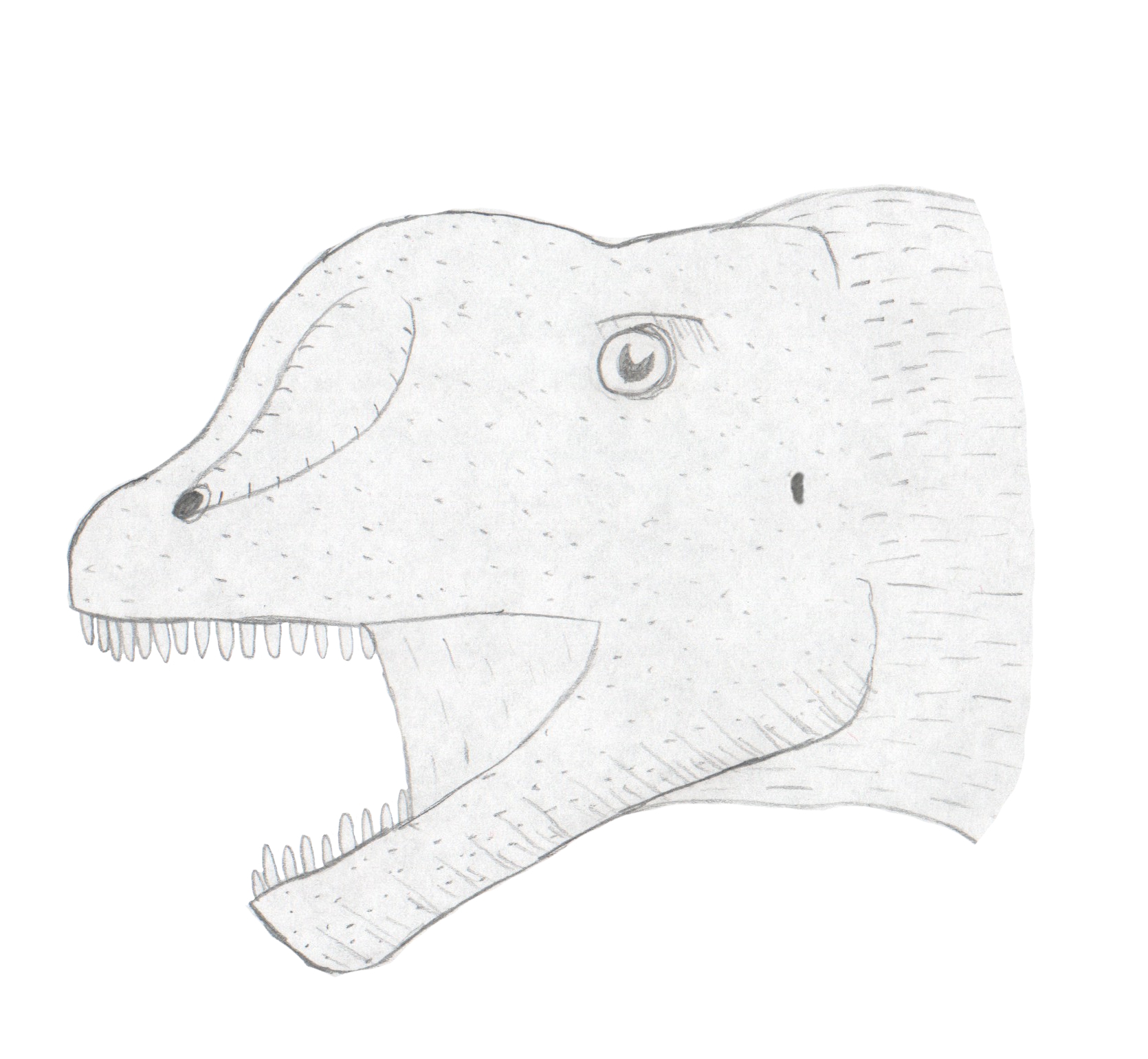
- Life restoration of the head

Scientific classification
- Kingdom: Animalia
- Phylum: Chordata
- Class: Reptilia
- Clade: Dinosauria
- Clade: Saurischia
- Clade: †Sauropodomorpha
- Clade: †Sauropoda
- Family: †Cetiosauridae
- Genus: †Chebsaurus; Mahammed et al., 2005
- Species: †C. algeriensis

Binomial name
- †Chebsaurus algeriensis Mahemmed et al., 2005

= Chebsaurus =

Chebsaurus Temporal range: Callovian, 165–163 Ma

Sauropod dinosaur genus from Middle Jurassic Algeria

Chebsaurus is a genus of sauropod dinosaur, specifically a eusauropod. It lived in present-day Algeria, in the Callovian aged Aïssa Formation. The type species, C. algeriensis, was named in 2005 by Mahammed et al. and is the most complete Algerian sauropod known. It was around 8 to 9 metres (26 to 30 ft) long.

The word cheb (شاب) is colloquial Arabic for "young man", as the fossils found were believed to be from a juvenile. The original publication by Mahammed et al., gave Chebsaurus the nickname "the Giant of Ksour". A second skeleton, also from a juvenile of a similar ontogenetic stage, is also known.

Both skeletons, including cranial material, were found in the Ksour Mountains, part of the Occidental Saharan Atlas (Algerian High Atlas).
