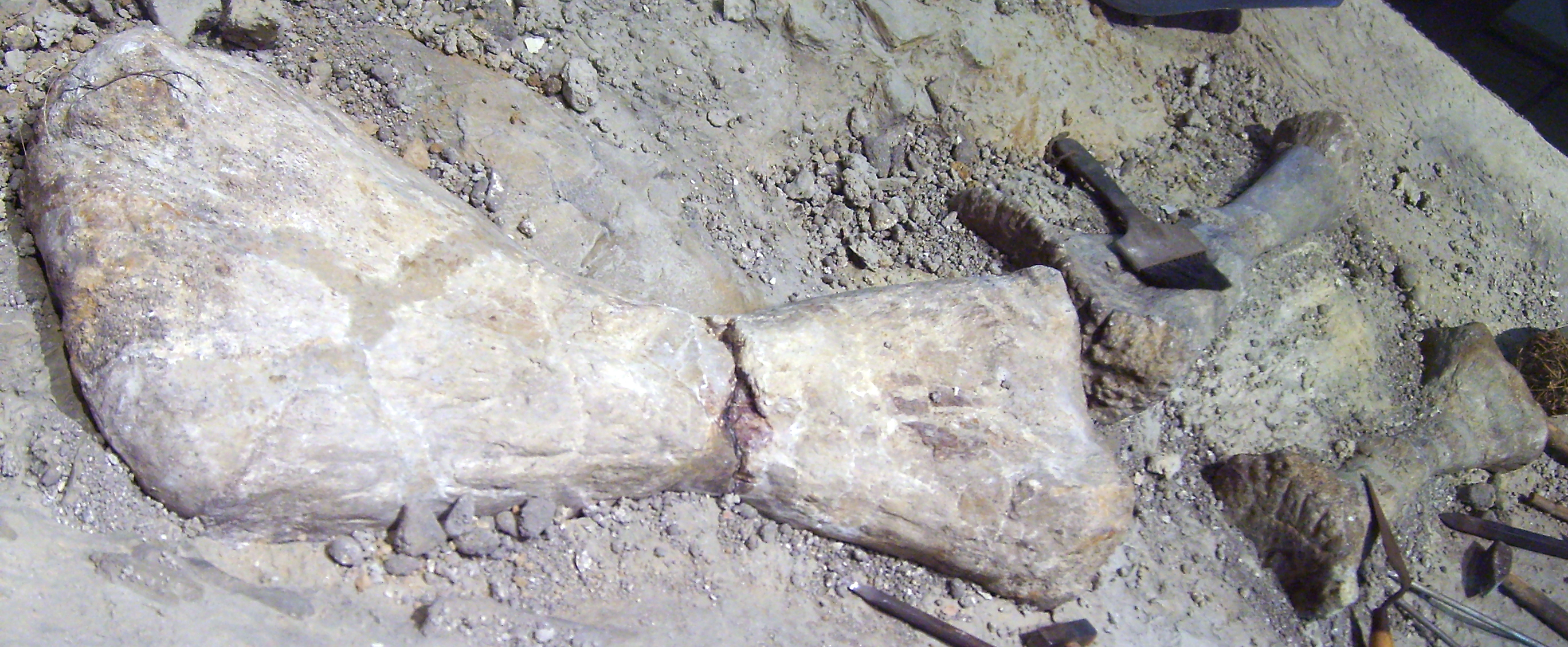
- Janenschia humerus, radius and ulna at the Museum für Naturkunde, Berlin

Scientific classification
- Kingdom: Animalia
- Phylum: Chordata
- Class: Reptilia
- Clade: Dinosauria
- Clade: Saurischia
- Clade: †Sauropodomorpha
- Clade: †Sauropoda
- Clade: †Neosauropoda
- Clade: †Macronaria
- Genus: †Janenschia; Wild, 1991
- Species: †J. robusta

Binomial name
- †Janenschia robusta (Fraas, 1908)

= Janenschia =

Janenschia Temporal range: 155–145 Ma Late Jurassic

Extinct genus of dinosaurs from late Jurassic in Lindi Region, Tanzania

Janenschia (named after Werner Janensch) is a genus of large herbivorous sauropod dinosaur from the Late Jurassic (around 155 to 145 million years ago) Tendaguru Formation of Lindi Region, Tanzania.

== Discovery and naming ==
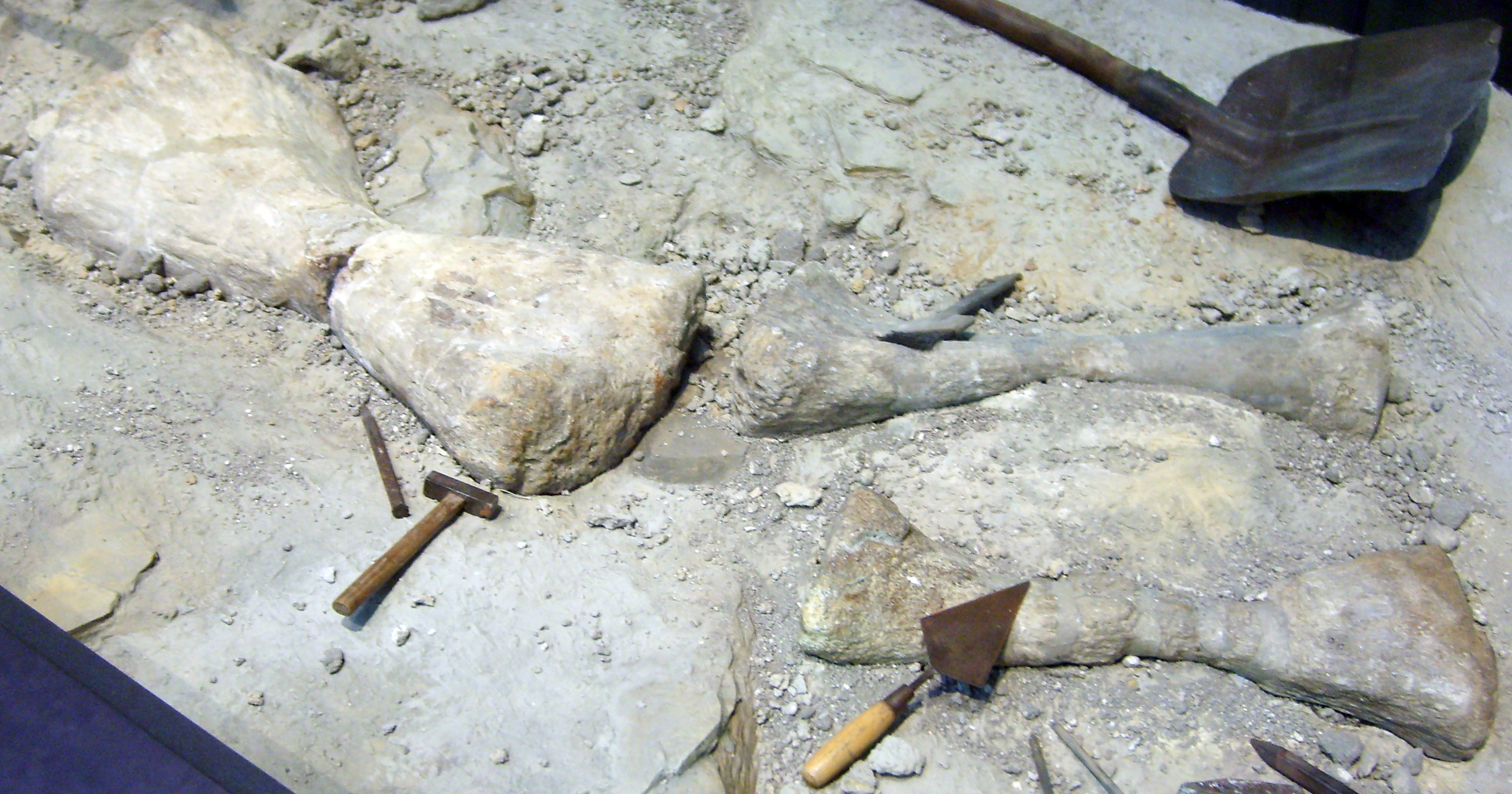
Alternate view

Janenschia has had a convoluted nomenclatural history. In 1907, Eberhard Fraas at "site P", nine hundred metres to the southeast of Tendaguru Hill, discovered two skeletons of gigantic sauropods. They were designated as "Skeleton A" and "Skeleton B". The fossils were transported to the collection of the Stuttgarter Naturaliensammlung in Stuttgart, Germany. Fraas in 1908 decided to name both skeletons as different species of one genus: Gigantosaurus. Skeleton A became Gigantosaurus africanus and skeleton B became Gigantosaurus robustus. The latter species was based on the holotype partial skeleton SMNS 12144, consisting of a right hindlimb. The specific name was inspired by the heavy build of the animal. While doing so, Fraas knew full well that the name Gigantosaurus was already preoccupied by another taxon: Gigantosaurus megalonyx, named by Harry Govier Seeley in 1869. Fraas thought his actions could be justified by the fact that the description by Seeley had been limited and that the material of G. megalonyx had since been referred to another genus, Ornithopsis, by Richard Lydekker.

In 1911, Richard Sternfeld renamed Gigantosaurus Fraas 1908 to Tornieria, pointing out that Fraas's arguments had been irrelevant. Tornieria africana became the type species of the new genus. G. robustus was placed in Tornieria, as T. robusta. Sternfeld's move was not well received in Germany, as he had acted without consent of the ailing Fraas. In a 1922 article describing the hand of the animal, Werner Janensch, who at the Tendaguru had collected additional material, announced that he would keep using the name Gigantosaurus robustus. He claimed that G. megalonyx was a forgotten nomen oblitum and that the rules of the zoological nomenclature should be disregarded if they caused instability by replacing a well-known name by a completely new one. At the same time he synonymized Tornieria with Barosaurus as regarded its type species which then became a Barosaurus africanus. Janensch, for the remainder of his career, would consistently apply the name Gigantosaurus robustus. In 1928, Sidney Henry Haughton exceptionally assigned Tornieria robusta to Barosaurus also, as a Barosaurus robustus.

In 1930, Baron Franz Nopcsa rejected Janensch's arguments. He admitted that Sternfeld had been discourteous but pointed out that the ICZN only in 1927 recommended that the original author should be involved in such name changes. It would thus be absurd to object to an article written in 1911 — and in any case the lack of courtesy had no bearing on the validity of the name. Nopcsa had found several later mentions of G. megalonyx, which thus had not been a nomen oblitum. Furthermore, Gigantosaurus robustus had not exactly been a well-known name itself, prior to 1922. Distasteful as it might be, Nopcsa concluded, it was inevitable to consider Tornieria to be a valid name. SMNS 12144 was subsequently referred to Tornieria by other authors.

In 1991, German palaeontologist Rupert Wild of the Stuttgart Museum of Natural Sciences clarified the taxonomic status of G. robustus by concluding that it was generically distinct from Tornieria. He renamed it Janenschia in honor of Werner Janensch, who had studied the vertebrate fauna from Tendaguru. Janenschia was placed in the family Titanosauridae, making it the oldest member of Titanosauria.

A number of specimens formerly assigned to Janenschia have been recognized as distinct genera. Two anterior dorsal vertebrae, and a possible posterior cervical vertebra, previously referred to the genus, were named Tendaguria in 2000. On the other hand, the caudal vertebral series MB.R.2091.1–30 does not overlap with SMNS 12144 and instead represents the first taxon of Mamenchisauridae from outside Asia, Wamweracaudia. Recent cladistic analysis places Janenschia as a non-titanosauriform sauropod.

== See also ==
- Narindasaurus
