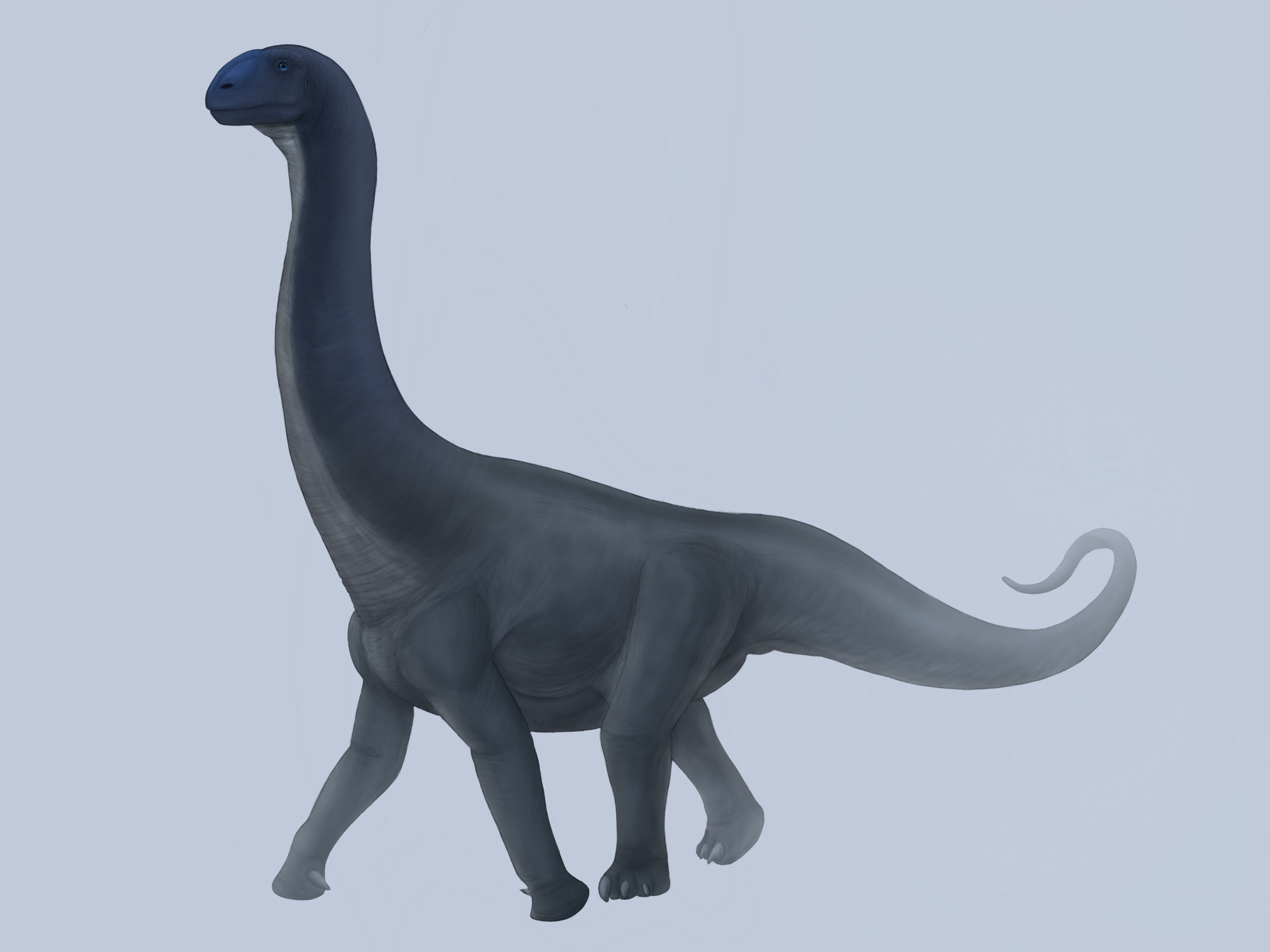
- Restoration of Cetiosaurus

Scientific classification
- Kingdom: Animalia
- Phylum: Chordata
- Class: Reptilia
- Clade: Dinosauria
- Clade: Saurischia
- Clade: †Sauropodomorpha
- Clade: †Sauropoda
- Clade: †Eusauropoda
- Family: †Cetiosauridae; Lydekker, 1888

Subgroups
- †Cetiosaurus; †Chebsaurus?; †Ferganasaurus?; †Lapparentosaurus?; †Patagosaurus; †Perijasaurus?; †"Rutellum"?; †Mamenchisaurinae?

= Cetiosauridae =

Cetiosauridae Temporal range: Late Toarcian—Callovian, 178–161 Ma

Extinct family of dinosaurs

Cetiosauridae is a family of sauropod dinosaurs which was first proposed by Richard Lydekker in 1888. While traditionally a wastebasket taxon containing various unrelated species, some recent studies have found that it may represent a natural clade. Alongside Cetiosaurus from the Middle Jurassic of Britain, other taxa recently assigned to the family include Lapparentosaurus from the Middle Jurassic of Madagascar, and Patagosaurus from the late Early-Middle Jurassic of Patagonia, which share autapomorphies with Cetiosaurus that are not shared by other eusauropods. Additionally, at least one study has suggested that the mamenchisaurids may represent a sub-group of the cetiosaurids, which would be termed Mamenchisaurinae.

Cladogram of Sauropoda after Holwerda et al 2021, showing the position of Cetiosauridae:

- Sauropoda
  - - Vulcanodon
    - Tazoudasaurus
  - - - Barapasaurus
      - - Spinophorosaurus
        - Volkheimeria
    - Eusauropoda
      - Shunosaurus
      - - Cetiosauridae
          - Cetiosaurus oxoniensis
          - - Patagosaurus
            - Cetiosaurus Rutland specimen
        - - Mamenchisauridae
            - Omeisaurus
            - Mamenchisaurus
          - - Turiasauria
            - - Jobaria
              - Neosauropoda
