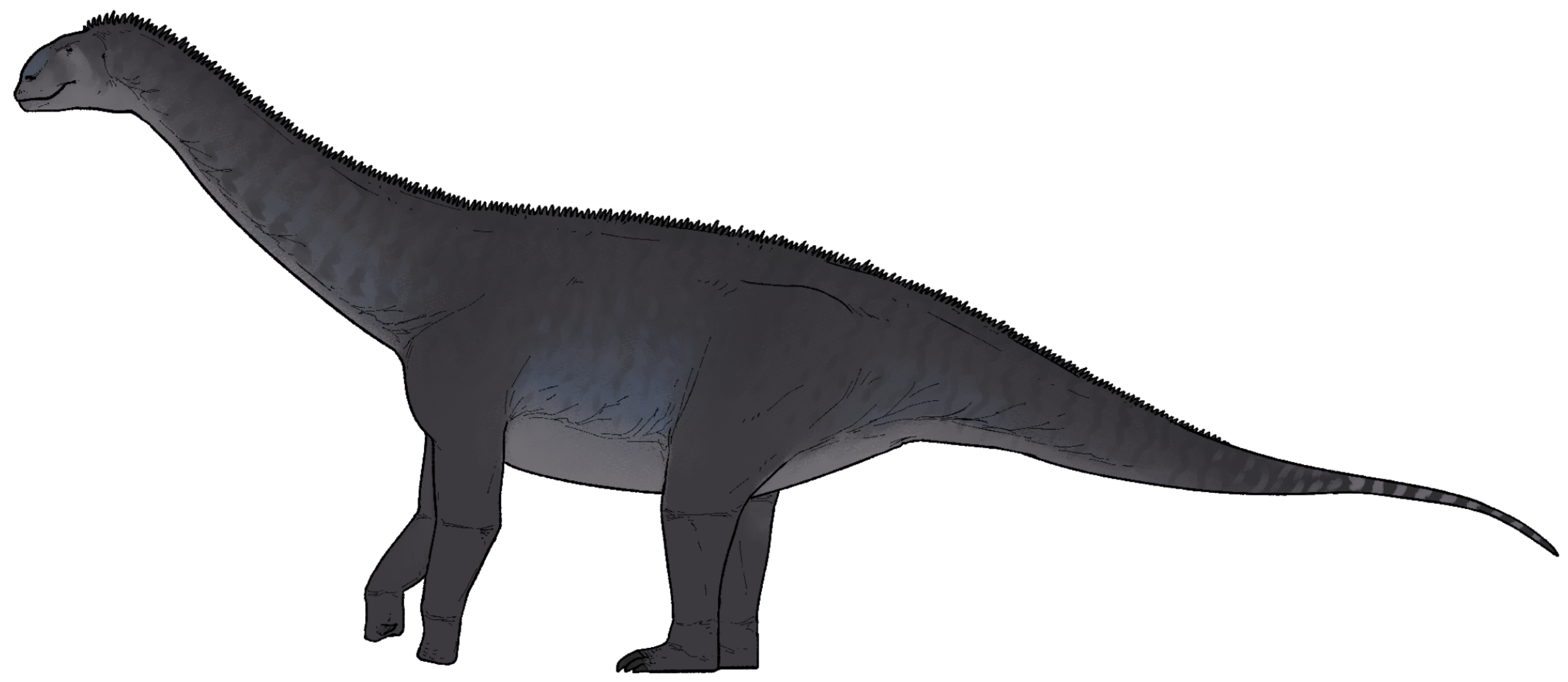
- Speculative life restoration

Scientific classification
- Kingdom: Animalia
- Phylum: Chordata
- Class: Reptilia
- Clade: Dinosauria
- Clade: Saurischia
- Clade: †Sauropodomorpha
- Clade: †Sauropoda
- Clade: †Turiasauria
- Genus: †Yantaloong; Zhang et al., 2026
- Species: †Y. lini

Binomial name
- †Yantaloong lini Zhang et al., 2026

= Yantaloong =

Yantaloong Temporal range: Middle Jurassic

Genus of sauropod dinosaurs

Yantaloong is an extinct genus of eusauropod dinosaur known from the Middle Jurassic Zhanghe Formation of China. The genus contains a single species, Yantaloong lini, known from six presacral vertebrae. Phylogenetic analyses place Yantaloong as a close relative of Jobaria and Lapparentosaurus. In one analysis version, these taxa were placed as the sister taxon to a clade of 'traditional turiasaurs', forming a broader Turiasauria than recognized previously. If it is a turiasaur, it would be the first one known from East Asia.

== Classification ==
To determine the relationships and affinities of Yantaloong, Zhang et al. (2026) scored it in updated versions of the phylogenetic matrices of Moore et al. (2023) and Mannion et al. (2019), both of which are ultimately derived from a matrix by González Riga et al. (2018) based on several updates made by other researchers in the years following its publication. The equal weighting analysis of Moore et al. (2023) (Topology A below) recovered Yantaloong in a polytomy with Lapparentosaurus and a clade formed by Jobaria and Atlasaurus. This entire clade was recovered as the sister taxon to one comprising traditional genera of the Turiasauria. Together, they form a larger Turiasauria based on its taxonomic definition. Under extended implied weights (Topology B), Yantaloong was instead recovered as the earliest-diverging member of the neosauropod clade Macronaria. Using the Mannion et al. (2019) matrix, Yantaloong was placed in a clade including Jobaria, as the sister taxon to Lapparentosaurus. Under equal weighting (Topology C) and extended implied weights (Topology D), this clade was placed diverging before Turiasauria. These versions differed in the placement of a clade comprising Tehuelchesaurus, Bellusaurus, Janenschia, and Haestasaurus, in relation to turiasaurs. Zhang et al. preferred the turiasaurian placement derived from the equal weights analysis from the Moore et al. (2023) matrix, as these results demonstrate the highest stability (compared to the poorly supported macronarian placement under extended implied weights), in addition to the broader taxon sampling used in this matrix.

Topology A: Moore et al. (2023) dataset, equal weights

- - Mamenchisauridae
  - - Turiasauria
      - - Lapparentosaurus
        - Yantaloong
        - - Atlasaurus
          - Jobaria
      - - Losillasaurus
        - - - Turiasaurus
            - Zby
          - - Mierasaurus
            - Moabosaurus
    - Neosauropoda
      - Diplodocoidea
      - Macronaria

Topology B: Moore et al. (2023) dataset, extended implied weights

- - Mamenchisauridae
  - - Turiasauria
      - - Lapparentosaurus
        - - Atlasaurus
          - Jobaria
      - - Losillasaurus
        - - - Turiasaurus
            - Zby
          - - Mierasaurus
            - Moabosaurus
    - Neosauropoda
      - Diplodocoidea
      - Macronaria
        - Yantaloong
        - later-diverging macronarians

Topology C: Mannion et al. (2019) dataset, equal weights

- - Mamenchisauridae
  - - - Jobaria
      - - Lapparentosaurus
        - Yantaloong
    - - Turiasauria
        - - Tehuelchesaurus
          - - Bellusaurus
            - - Janenschia
              - Haestasaurus
        - - Losillasaurus
          - - - Turiasaurus
              - Zby
            - - Mierasaurus
              - - Moabosaurus
                - Tendaguria
      - Neosauropoda
        - Diplodocoidea
        - Macronaria
          - Atlasaurus
          - - - Camarasaurus
              - Lourinhasaurus
            - - Aragosaurus
              - later-diverging macronarians

Topology D: Mannion et al. (2019) dataset, extended implied weights

- - Mamenchisauridae
  - - - Jobaria
      - - Lapparentosaurus
        - Yantaloong
    - - Turiasauria
        - - Losillasaurus
          - - Turiasaurus
            - Zby
        - - Mierasaurus
          - - Moabosaurus
            - Tendaguria
      - - - Tehuelchesaurus
          - - Bellusaurus
            - - Janenschia
              - Haestasaurus
        - - - Camarasaurus
            - Lourinhasaurus
          - Neosauropoda
            - Diplodocoidea
            - Macronaria
              - Aragosaurus
              - - Atlasaurus
                - later-diverging macronarians
