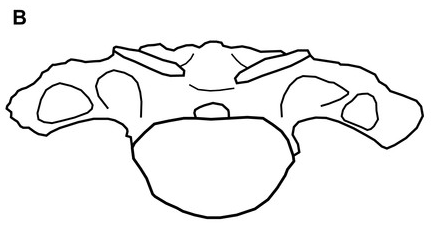
- Anterior dorsal vertebra of T. tanzaniensis

Scientific classification
- Kingdom: Animalia
- Phylum: Chordata
- Class: Reptilia
- Clade: Dinosauria
- Clade: Saurischia
- Clade: †Sauropodomorpha
- Clade: †Sauropoda
- Clade: †Eusauropoda
- Clade: †Turiasauria
- Genus: †Tendaguria; Bonaparte et al., 2000
- Species: †T. tanzaniensis

Binomial name
- †Tendaguria tanzaniensis Bonaparte et al., 2000

= Tendaguria =

Tendaguria Temporal range: Tithonian, 149.2–145 Ma

Extinct genus of dinosaurs

Tendaguria (/ˌtɛndəˈɡjʊəriə/ TEN-də-GURE-ee-ə; meaning "the Tendaguru one") is a genus of herbivorous sauropod dinosaur from the Late Jurassic of Lindi Region, Tanzania.

== Discovery and naming ==
In 1911, German geologist Wilhelm Bornhardt at Nambango in German East Africa discovered two sauropod vertebrae, fifteen kilometers (nine miles) southeast of Tendaguru Hill. These were described by Werner Janensch in 1929, but not named.

The finds were formally named by José Fernando Bonaparte, Wolf-Dieter Heinrich and Rupert Wild in 2000. The type species is Tendaguria tanzaniensis (/tænˌzeɪniˈɛnsɪs/ tan-ZAY-nee-EN-siss). The generic name refers to the Tendaguru, the area of the great German palaeontological expeditions between 1909 and 1912. The specific name was "after Tanzania, the country where the holotype was collected".

The type specimen consists of two syntypes, MB.R.2092.1 (NB4) and MB.R.2092.2 (NB5), probably uncovered in the Upper Saurian Bed (Obere Dinosauriermergel), Tendaguru Series, dating from the Tithonian stage of the Late Jurassic. The specimens are two anterior dorsal vertebrae, part of the collection of the Berlin's Natural History Museum. They probably belong to the same individual, having been found at a short distance from each other. Cervical vertebra MB.R.2091.31 (G45) was also referred to Tendaguria, also from the Upper Saurian Bed, found 600 meters south of Tendaguru Hill at Quarry G.

== Description ==
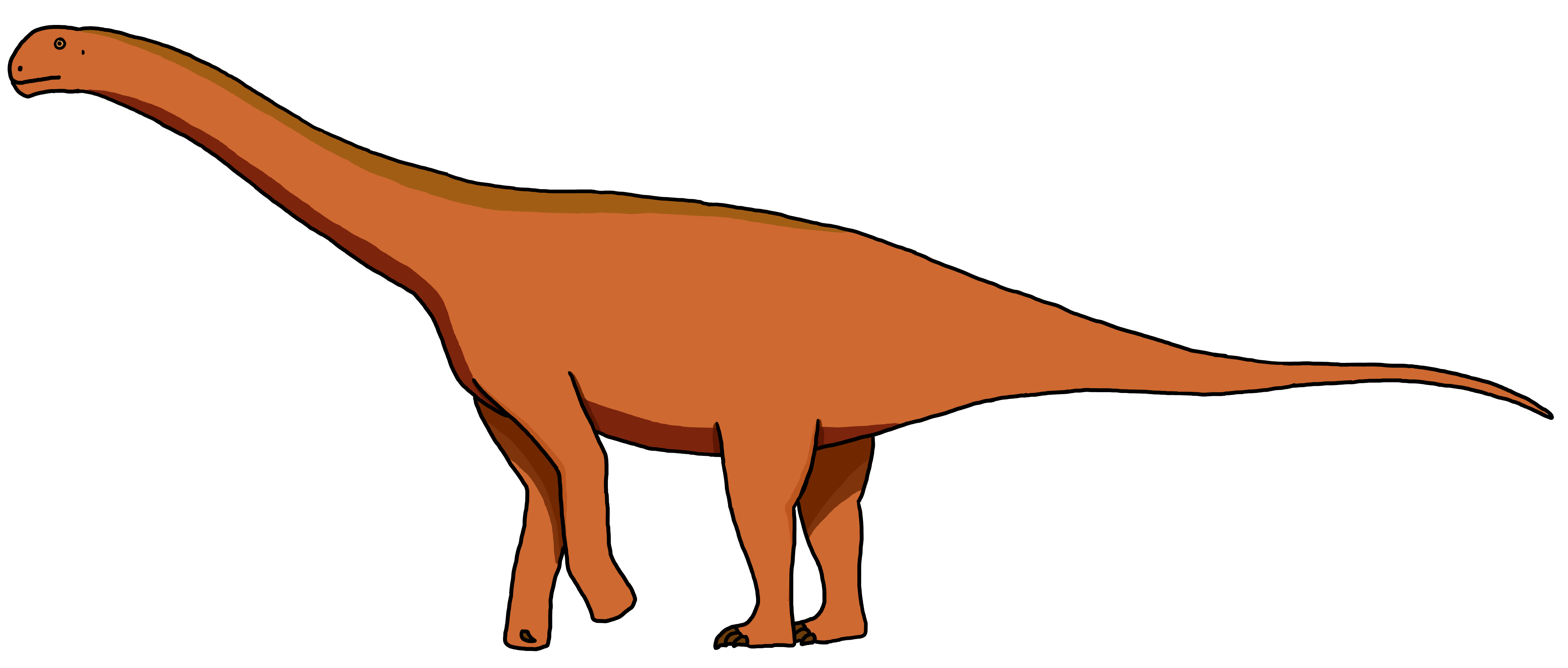
Life reconstruction

Tendaguria was a large sauropod from the Tendaguru fossil locality. Its length is estimated at twenty meters (sixty-six feet). It can be distinguished from other sauropods by the presence of two distinct cavities on the diapophyses of the anterior dorsal vertebrae. One is located behind and lateral to the prezygapophysis, on the anterior section of the diapophysis, while the other is behind the prezygapophyses. Additionally, it is unique from other turiasaurs in that it has a defined ridge in the middle of the anteriormost dorsal spines.

== Classification ==
Due to its unique morphology, Tendaguria defied classification in the original description, where the authors placed it as Sauropoda incertae sedis, though also naming a separate Tendaguriidae. It shows a mix of basal and derived traits, indicating a position outside, respectively inside, Neosauropoda. A cervical vertebra referred to Tendaguria because of a similar low spine shows some similarities to Camarasaurus. In 2014 it was included in a cladogram generated in the redescription of Diamantinasaurus, where it was placed as the sister to Wintonotitan within Somphospondyli.

- Somphospondyli
  - Chubutisaurus
  - - - Wintonotitan
      - Tendaguria
    - - Ligabuesaurus
      - - Phuwiangosaurus
        - Titanosauria
          - Andesaurus
          - - Argentinosaurus
            - - Epachthosaurus
              - Lithostrotia
                - Malawisaurus
                - - Nemegtosaurus
                  - - - Diamantinasaurus
                      - Tapuiasaurus
                    - - Alamosaurus
                      - Saltasauridae
                        - Opisthocoelicaudia
                        - - - Isisaurus
                            - Rapetosaurus
                          - - Trigonosaurus
                            - - Saltasaurus
                              - Neuquensaurus

In a redescription of Tendaguria and other Tendaguru sauropods, Mannion et al. (2019) assign Tendaguria to Turiasauria based on a large phylogenetic analysis where it is recovered as the sister taxon of Moabosaurus within the Turiasauria, based on shared features in their anterior dorsal vertebrae. The result of the extended implied weighting analysis is shown below, with large clades condensed for clarity.

- Eusauropoda
  - Shunosaurus
  - - Mamenchisauridae
      - Chuanjiesaurus
      - - Mamenchisaurus
        - Wamweracaudia
    - - Omeisaurus
      - - - Cetiosauriscus
          - Jobaria
        - - Lapparentosaurus
          - - Turiasauria
              - - Zby
                - - Losillasaurus
                  - Turiasaurus
              - - Mierasaurus
                - - Tendaguria
                  - Moabosaurus
            - - - Bellusaurus
                - - Haestasaurus
                  - Janenschia
              - - - Camarasaurus
                  - Lourinhasaurus
                - Neosauropoda
                  - Diplodocoidea
                  - Macronaria
