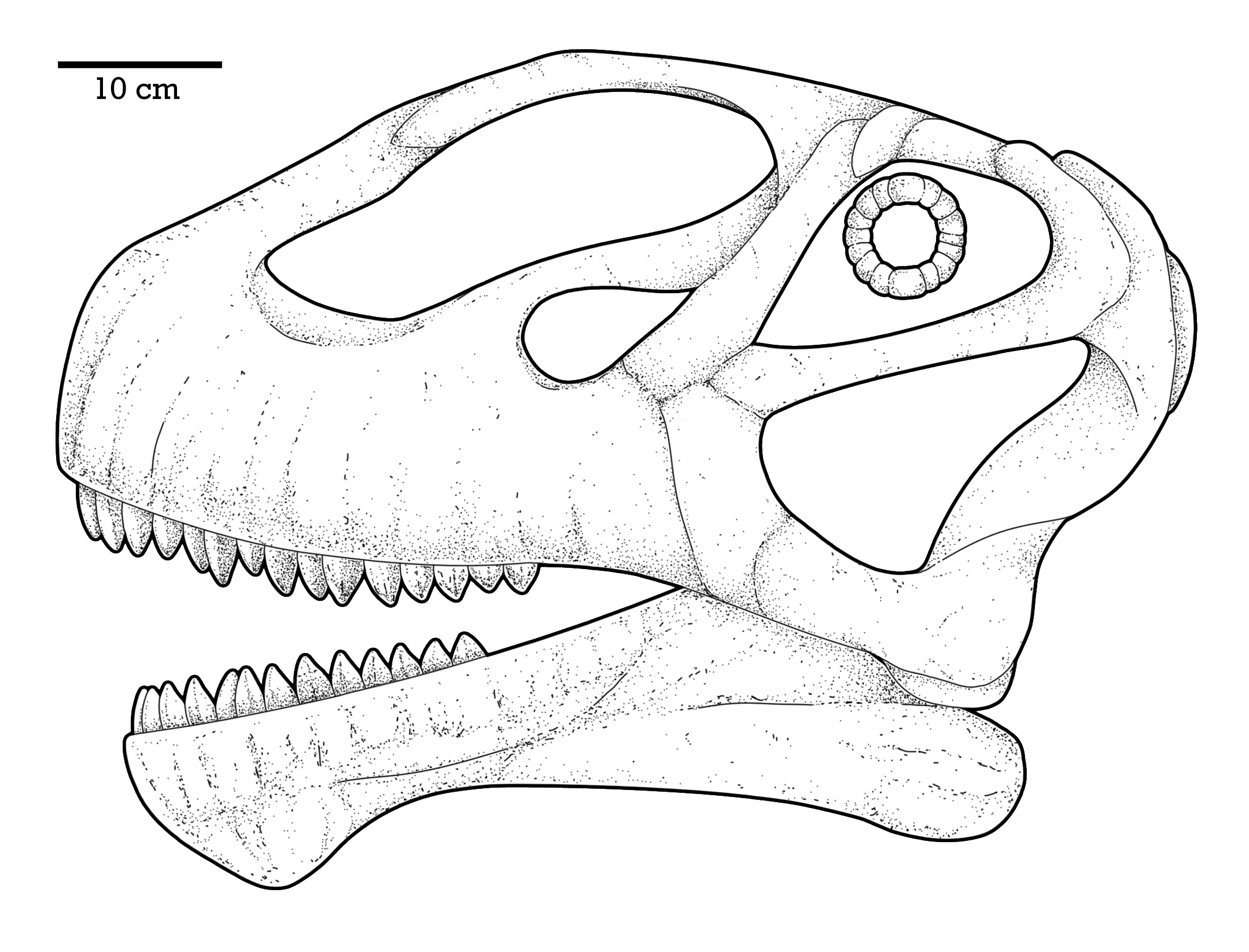
- Reconstructed skull of Mierasaurus

Scientific classification
- Kingdom: Animalia
- Phylum: Chordata
- Class: Reptilia
- Clade: Dinosauria
- Clade: Saurischia
- Clade: †Sauropodomorpha
- Clade: †Sauropoda
- Clade: †Turiasauria
- Genus: †Mierasaurus; Royo-Torres et al., 2017
- Species: †M. bobyoungi

Binomial name
- †Mierasaurus bobyoungi Royo-Torres et al., 2017

= Mierasaurus =

Mierasaurus Temporal range: Early Cretaceous (Valanginian), 136.4–132 Ma

Extinct genus of dinosaurs

Mierasaurus is an extinct genus of sauropod dinosaur from the Early Cretaceous of Utah, United States. The taxon was first described and named in 2017 by Rafael Royo-Torres and colleagues, from a mostly complete skeleton including a disarticulated partial skull and mandible, teeth, multiple vertebrae from along the length of the body, both scapulae, radius and ulna bones, a left manus, a complete pelvis, both femora and the entire left hindlimb. Additionally, they referred a lower jaw and femur from juvenile individuals, which were found nearby, to the genus. Collectively, Mierasaurus is among the most completely known North American sauropods. The genus name honours Bernardo de Miera y Pacheco, the first European scientist to enter what is now Utah. The type species for Mierasaurus is Mierasaurus bobyoungi, named after Robert Glen Young, a paleontologist who researched the Early Cretaceous of Utah.

Along with its closest relative Moabosaurus, also from the Early Cretaceous of Utah, Mierasaurus is among the last-surviving members of the Turiasauria, an otherwise Jurassic and European group which can be distinguished by heart-shaped teeth, slender humeri, and the presence of an extra depression on the surface of the ulnae, among other characteristics. Mierasaurus differs from Moabosaurus in characteristics such as lacking vertical ridges on its teeth, having relatively smooth bottom surfaces on its cervical vertebrae, having cervical ribs that do not prominently split into two at their tips, and lacking a bulge on the side of the femur. It is probable that the ancestors of Mierasaurus and Moabosaurus migrated, shortly before the emergence of the former, to western North America from surviving populations of turiasaurs in either Europe or eastern North America.

== Discovery and naming ==
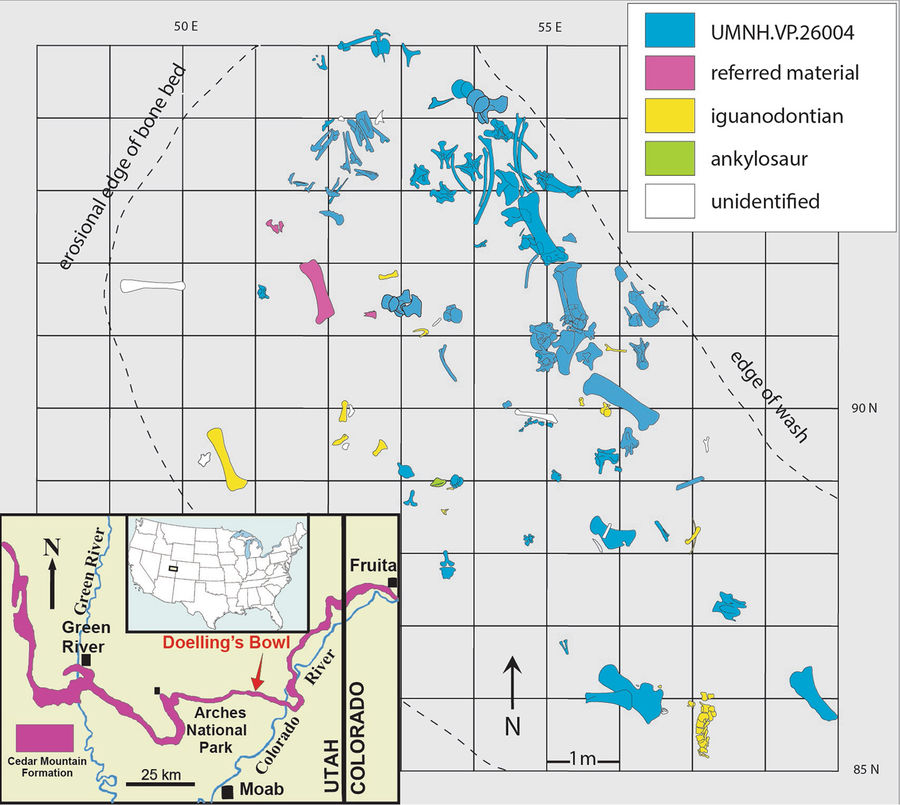
Excavation map of the Mierasaurus individual

Since 2005, the Utah Geological Survey has conducted annual excavations for several weeks at a time at a site known as Doelling's Bowl, located on lands managed by the US Bureau of Land Management in east-central Utah, United States. The site is catalogued as UMNH VP.LOC.1208 at the Natural History Museum of Utah (UMNH), and as Utah Loc. 42Gr0300v at the Utah Geological Survey. Its exact location is not publicly available. Doelling's Bowl is known for a large bone bed, covering some 5,000 m^{2} (54,000 sq ft) and measuring approximately 1 metre (3 ft 3 in) thick. The rocks appear to be locally flat, but form broad swales over the whole site. Out of this area, 140 m^{2} (1,500 sq ft) has been excavated, producing 1500 vertebrate bones. Rocks in the Doelling's Bowl bonebed mainly consist of green-grey, sandy mudstone, but also contain silcrete, casts of silificied plant roots, and chert pebbles. It belongs to the Cretaceous-aged Yellow Cat Member of the Cedar Mountain Formation.

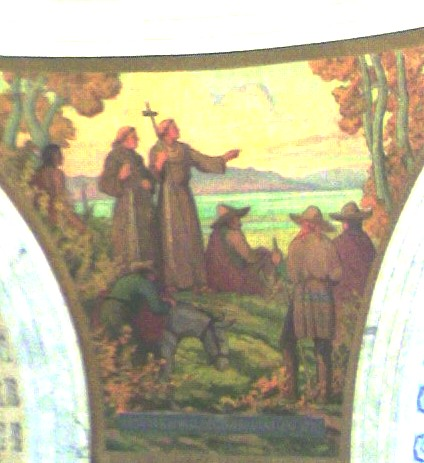
Mierasaurus was named after Bernardo de Miera y Pacheco of the 1776 Dominguez-Escalante expedition (pictured here)

In 2010, a skeleton of a subadult sauropod dinosaur was discovered in an arroyo within Gary's Island, a region at the western end of the bonebed named after its discoverer Gary Hunt. Only part of the specimen - a partial left forelimb (scapula, sternal plates, ulna, radius, and hand), a complete left hindlimb, and ten caudal (tail) vertebrae - was articulated. The feet of these limbs are buried in the sediment at a level deeper than the other remains, which suggests that the specimen died after being mired in soft mud. Other remains are scattered over an area of 10 m^{2} (110 sq ft), including a partial skull and lower jaw; three teeth; the atlas and eight other cervical vertebrae, along with eleven cervical ribs; eleven dorsal vertebrae, six dorsal ribs, and six sacral ribs; five other caudal vertebrae with two haemal arches; a right femur; and pelvic girdle elements, including an ilium, ischium, and two pubes. Although the remaining elements have been displaced and eroded by the arroyo, the specimen is still the most complete Cretaceous sauropod from North America. The specimen is catalogued as UMNH.VP.26004, but individual bones are catalogued with the prefix DBGI (Doelling's Bowl site).

Additional specimens - a lower jaw from a juvenile specimen, UMNH.VP.26010, and a juvenile femur, UMNH.VP.26011 - were also referred to the same taxon. In 2017, all of these specimens were described by Rafael Royo-Torres, Paul Upchurch, James Kirkland, Donald DeBlieux, John Foster, Alberto Cobos, and Luis Alcalá as part of a research paper published in Scientific Reports. They named a new genus for the specimens, Mierasaurus; the name honors Bernardo de Miera y Pacheco, a Spanish cartographer who was "the first European scientist to enter what is now Utah" in the Domínguez–Escalante expedition of 1776. They also named the type and only species M. bobyoungi after Robert ("Bob") Young, in order to acknowledge "the importance of [his] underappreciated research" the geology of the Early Cretaceous of Utah.

== Description ==
=== Skull ===
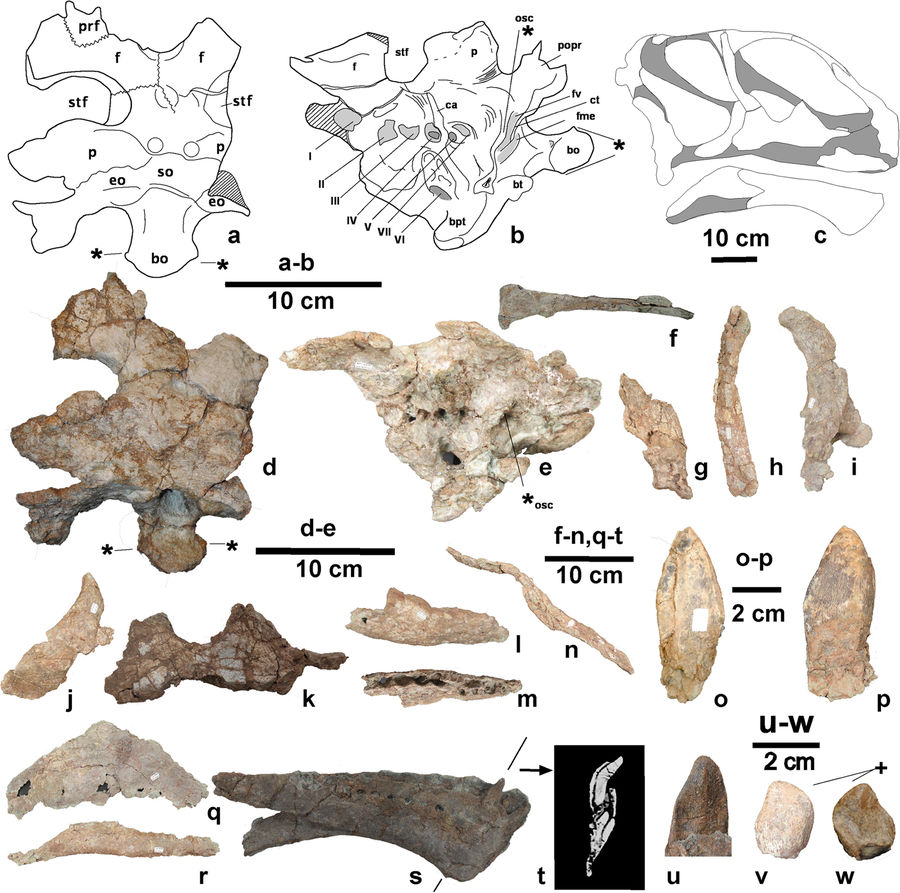
Cranial material of Mierasaurus

The skull of Mierasaurus is overall similar to those of other turiasaurs, which have rounded snouts with retracted nostril openings. The lower jaw of Mierasaurus becomes increasingly taller towards the front, which is like Camarasaurus but unlike the basal sauropod Jobaria. A sharp ridge extends across the bottom edge of the front of the lower jaw, seen in both dicraeosaurids and diplodocids, and to some extent Camarasaurus. The lower jaw bears thirteen teeth; the ones at the front are spatula-shaped while the ones at the rear are heart-shaped, which is a distinguishing characteristic of turiasaurs. Compared to Camarasaurus, the teeth at the front of the jaw are more pointed and have taller crowns. There are no well-developed vertical ridges on the outer surface of the teeth, in contrast to its closest relative Moabosaurus.

In Mierasaurus, the skull roof is overall flattened, lacking any convexities. Unlike more derived sauropods but also seen in Turiasaurus, the frontal bone of Mierasaurus participates in the margin of the supratemporal fenestra. Unique characteristics that differentiate Mierasaurus from other turiasaurs can be found in its braincase: a ridge known as the otosphenoidal ridge extends from the front of the paroccipital process—a bony spur to which neck muscles attach—and runs along its inner edge; and the occipital condyle, which articulates with the atlas, has a pair of rounded ridges on the sides of its articular surfaces (which Moabosaurus lacks). Like Turiasaurus, Mierasaurus has a pair of foramina at the top end of the transverse nuchal crest on the supraoccipital bone. Like in Moabosaurus, the downward projections known as the basal tubera on the basioccipital bone are L-shaped when viewed from the bottom.

=== Vertebrae ===
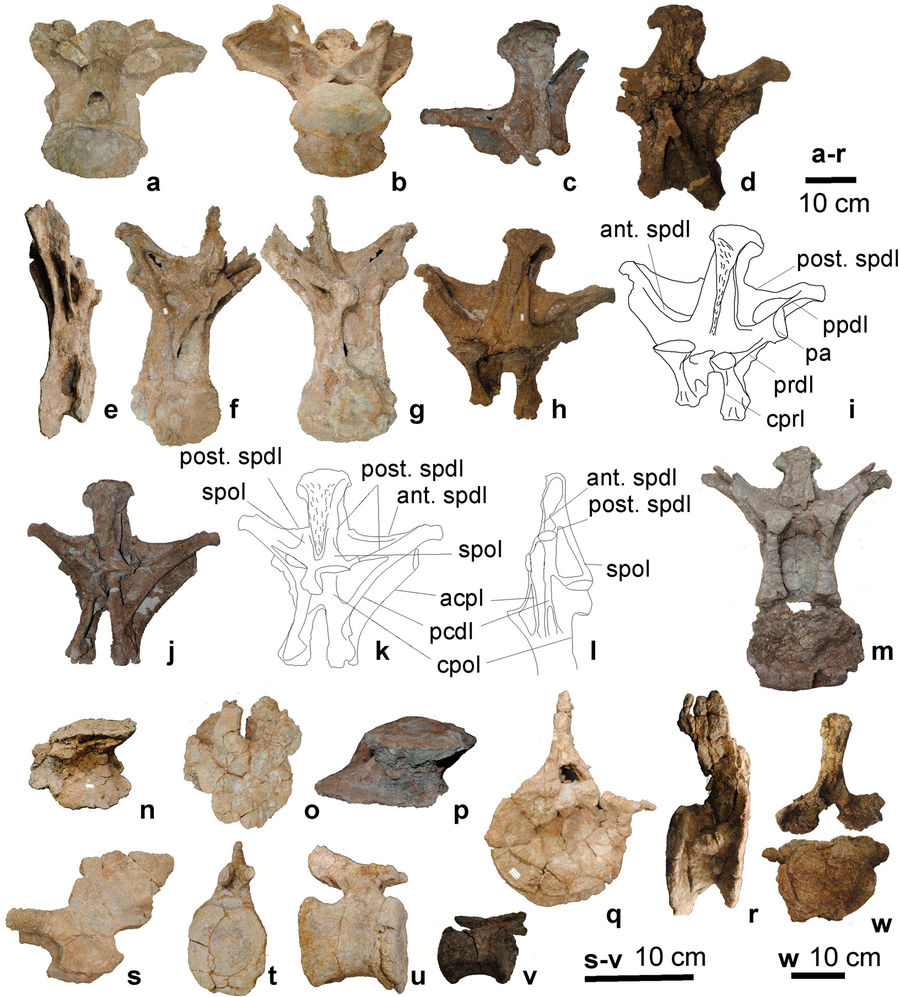
Dorsal and caudal vertebrae

Mierasaurus can be excluded from the Titanosauriformes due to the solid internal structure of its vertebrae and ribs, which indicates they lack air-filled cavities. Uniquely, on the bottom of the internal cavity of the atlantal intercentrum (term used for the unfused lower half of vertebral centrum of the atlas) in Mierasaurus, there is a pair of depressions that articulates with the odontoid process of the axis (second cervical). Moabosaurus lacks these depressions, and the cervical rib articulation (parapophysis) is more robust. As seen in Kaatedocus, the laminae extending from the neural spines to the prezygapophysis of the cervical vertebrae are well-developed and cap depressions underneath. The cervical neural spines are not strongly split (bifurcated) in Mierasaurus, less so than those of Turiasaurus. Also unlike Moabosaurus, there are no keels or hollows on the bottom of the cervical centra. None of the cervical ribs are visibly bifurcated either, unlike both Turiasaurus and Moabosaurus, although there are small upward projections at the tips of the first few cervical ribs which may represent incipient or rudimentary bifurcation. There is a ridge on the side of the tubercle of each rib, which is a unique diagnostic feature of Mierasaurus.

The rear dorsal vertebrae in Mierasaurus are concave on both ends (amphicoelous), whereas the opposite (opisthicoelous) is true for Mierasaurus, Camarasaurus, and titanosauriforms. Mierasaurus does not have the prespinal laminae (ridges on the front of the spine) present in the rear dorsal vertebrae of Moabosaurus, and the articular process known as the hyposphene is triangular in Mierasaurus while it is rectangular in Moabosaurus. However, Mierasaurus shares with Moabosaurus dorsal neural spines with spinodiapophyseal laminae that bifurcate towards the top of each spine, with one branch extending forwards and one backwards. The caudal (tail) vertebrae are concave in front and convex behind (procoelous), as in Turiasaurus, Moabosaurus, Losillasaurus, and the Titanosauria. Also like titanosauriforms, the neural arches are located on the front halves of each centrum, and the haemal canals are long compared to the haemal arches that form them, at 41% of the bones' length. There are characteristic depressions at the lower outer sides of the haemal arches.

=== Limbs ===
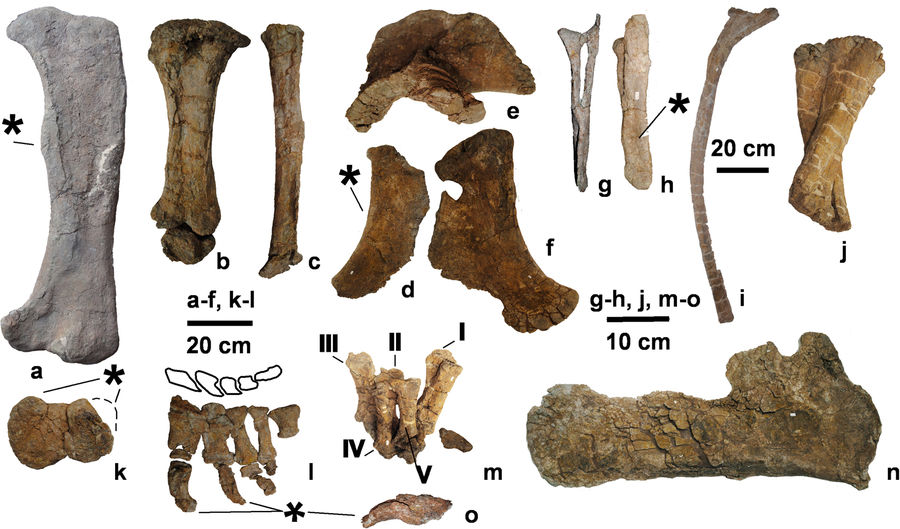
Limb and girdle remains

The forelimbs of Mierasaurus exhibit many shared (synapomorphic) turiasaurian traits. In the shoulder girdle of Mierasaurus, the articulation with the scapula on the coracoid is about half the bone's length. The humerus is slender, with an HRI (humerus robustness index) of only 0.27; the maximum width of the bottom end, similarly, measures only 40% of the bone's total length. A T-shaped/Y-shaped profile is present at the top end of the ulna due to the strong development of the rear-projecting process. Besides the depression for articulating with the radius, there is a second deep depression like Moabosaurus, Turiasaurus, Losillasaurus, Zby, and Dystrophaeus. The top end of the radius is large, being at least half the length, of the bottom end.

Unlike the rounded margins seen titanosauriforms, the front margin of the ilium is triangular in Mierasaurus. Uniquely, Moabosaurus also has a very short ischium compared to its pubis; the former measures only 75% of the length of the latter, otherwise seen only among titanosaurs. However, the bulge on the side of the femur is missing, which differentiates Mierasaurus from both titanosauriforms and Moabosaurus (which has a slight bulge). The fourth trochanter of the femur is only located 40% of the way down from the top of the bone, compared to halfway for most other sauropods, and the condyles at the bottom end are, unusually, roughly the same size. Synapomorphic of turiasaurs, the cnemial crest of the tibia points forwards. The inner surface of the astragalus in the ankle narrows to form a triangular process, like Turiasaurus. On the five-digited foot, the number of phalanges is 2, 3, 3, 2, and possibly 0. Unlike most other sauropods, with the exception of Vulcanodon and Sanpasaurus, the claws on the second and third digits are compressed vertically, not horizontally.

== Classification ==
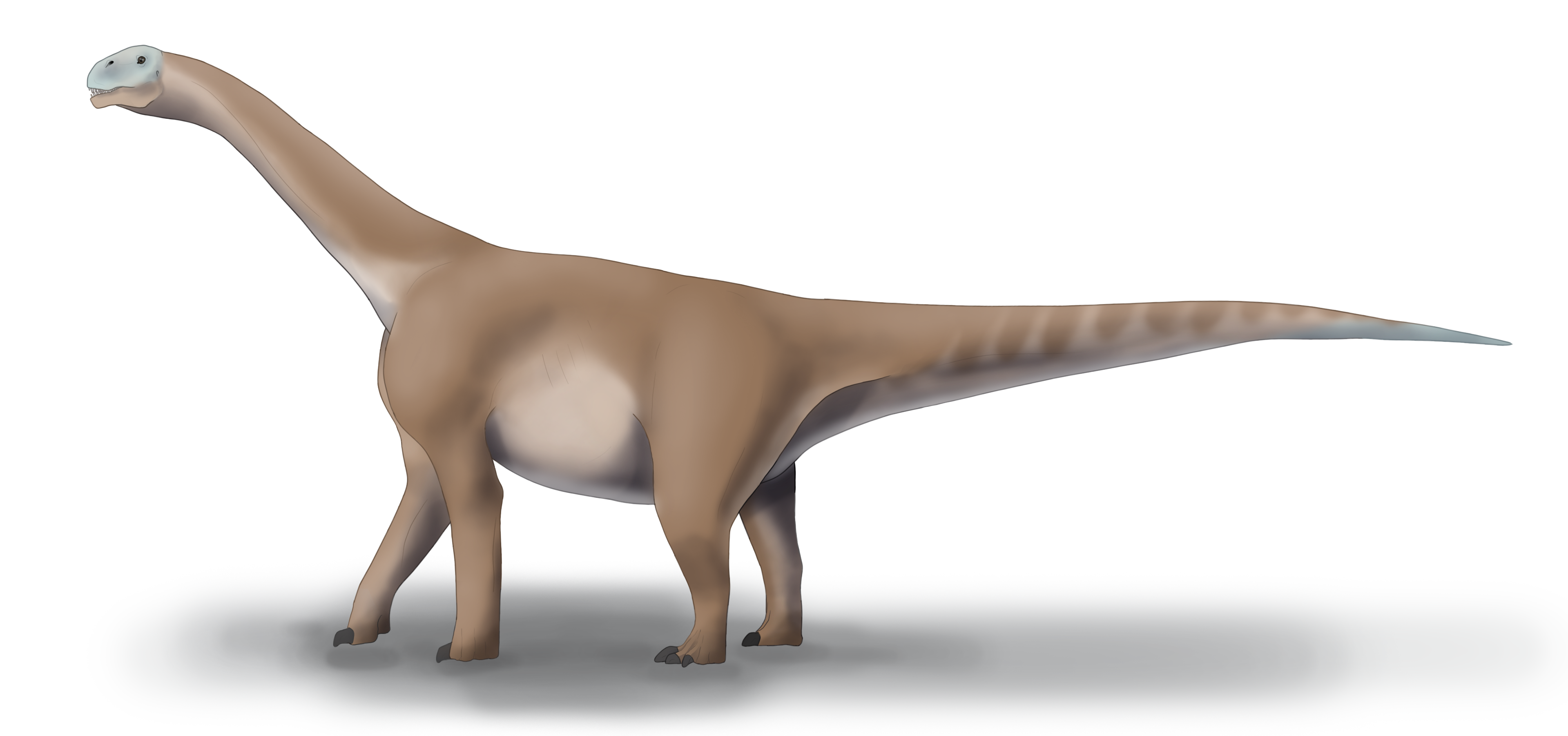
Moabosaurus was the closest relative of Mierasaurus

Based on inserting Mierasaurus into two prior analyses, one by José Carbadillo and Martin Sander in 2013 and another by Philip Mannion and colleagues in 2017, Royo-Torres and colleagues identified a number of synapomorphic traits that allow Mierasaurus to be placed among the Turiasauria. Asides from limb characteristics noted above, other synapomorphies include the slightly concave profile of the rear surface of the basal tubera; the heart-shaped teeth; the height of the dorsal neural arches below the level of the articular processes known as postzygapophyses being at least equal to that of their corresponding centra; the opisthocoelous condition of the rear dorsals; the slightly procoelous front caudals; the presence of depressions known as pleurocoels in the front caudals; the neural spines of the front caudals being less than 1.2 times the height of their corresponding centra; and the centra of the middle caudals being at least as wide as they are long. Although not an explicit synapomorphy, the secondary depression on the ulna also unites Mierasaurus with other turiasaurs.

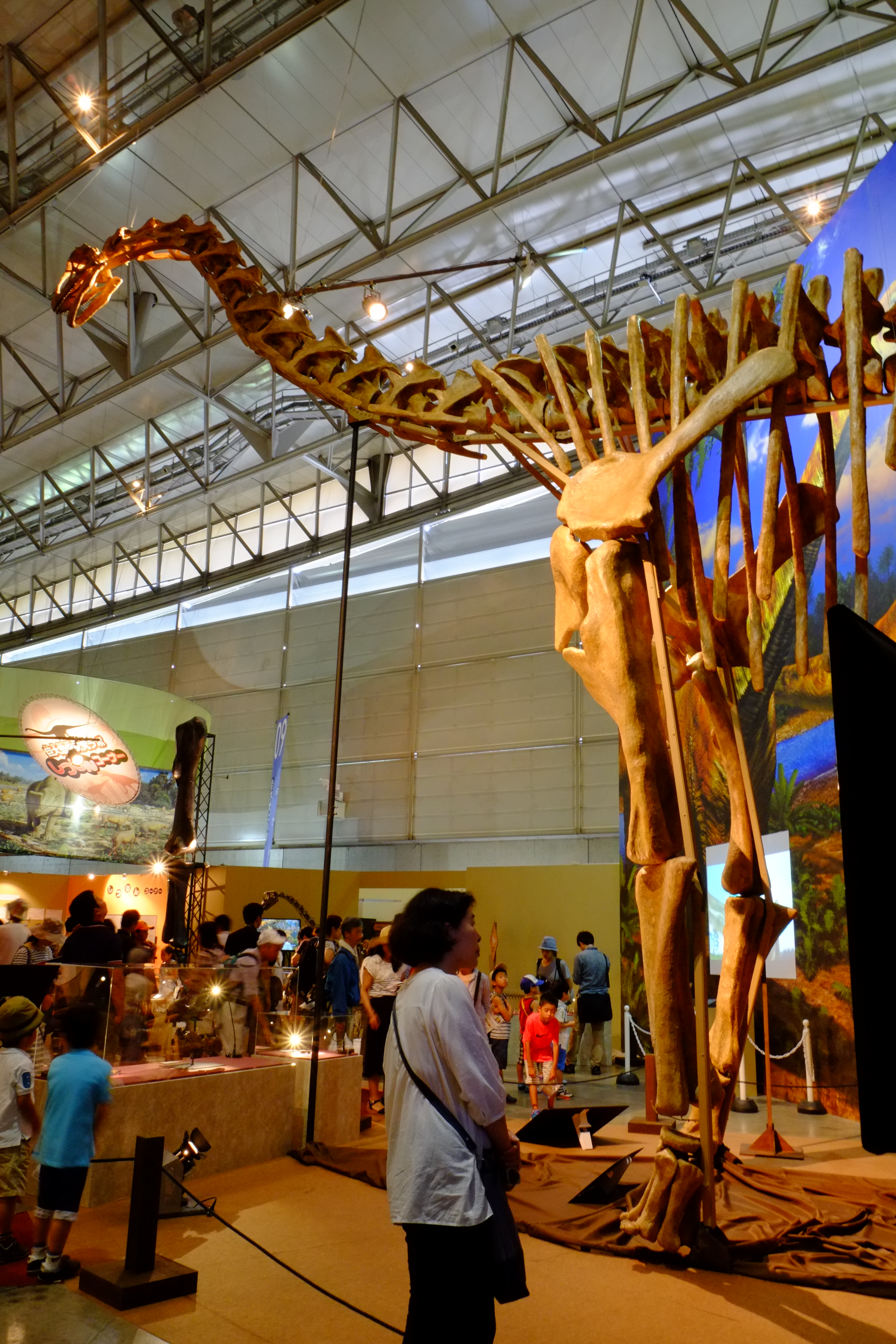
The presence of bifurcation in the cervical ribs distinguishes Turiasaurus from Mierasaurus

Within the Turiasauria, Royo-Torres and colleagues considered the likewise-Cretaceous Moabosaurus to be the closest relative of Mierasaurus. They share the L-shaped profile of the basal tubera, and the bifurcating spinodiapophyseal laminae of the dorsal neural spines. However, they differ from each other by twelve characteristics. Moabosaurus lacks rounded ridges on its occipital condyle; has vertical ridges on its teeth; has a robust parapophysis; lacks depressions on its atlas intercentrum; has hollows and keels on the bottom of its cervical centra; has convex as opposed to straight centroprezygapophyseal laminae in its front cervicals; has bifurcating cervical ribs; lacks ridges or bulges accompanying the tubercles of its cervical ribs; has prespinal laminae in its middle and rear dorsals; has rectangular as opposed to triangular hyposphenes in its rear dorsals; has uniformly opisthocoelous dorsals; and has a bulge on its femur. The lack of prominent bifurcation in the cervical ribs also differentiates Mierasaurus from Turiasaurus and potentially other turiasaurs.

The phylogenetic trees recovered by Royo-Torres and colleagues from the two different analyses agreed upon the position of turiasaurs, placing them as a unified group containing Mierasaurus, Moabosaurus, Turiasaurus, Losillasasurus, and Zby outside of the Neosauropoda (thus excluding them from both the Diplodocoidea and the Macronaria). Below, the tree based on the analysis of Mannion and colleagues is reproduced; it yielded well-resolved relationships within the Turiasauria, as opposed to the tree based on the analysis of Carbadillo and Sander. The continent-level geographic ranges of various taxa are included in the tree.

- Eusauropoda
  - Shunosaurus Asian
  - - Omeisaurus Asian
    - - - Lapparentosaurus African
        - Jobaria African
      - - Mamenchisaurus Asian
        - - Atlasaurus African
          - - Turiasauria
              - Losillasaurus European
              - - - Zby European
                  - Turiasaurus European
                - - Moabosaurus North American
                  - Mierasaurus North American
            - Neosauropoda
              - Diplodocoidea Widespread
              - Macronaria
                - - Tehuelchesaurus South American
                  - - Janenschia African
                    - Haestasaurus European
                - - Camarasaurus North American
                  - - Aragosaurus European
                    - - Galvesaurus European
                      - Titanosauriformes
                        - Brachiosauridae Widespread
                        - Somphospondyli Widespread

== Paleoecology ==
=== Locality and contemporaries ===
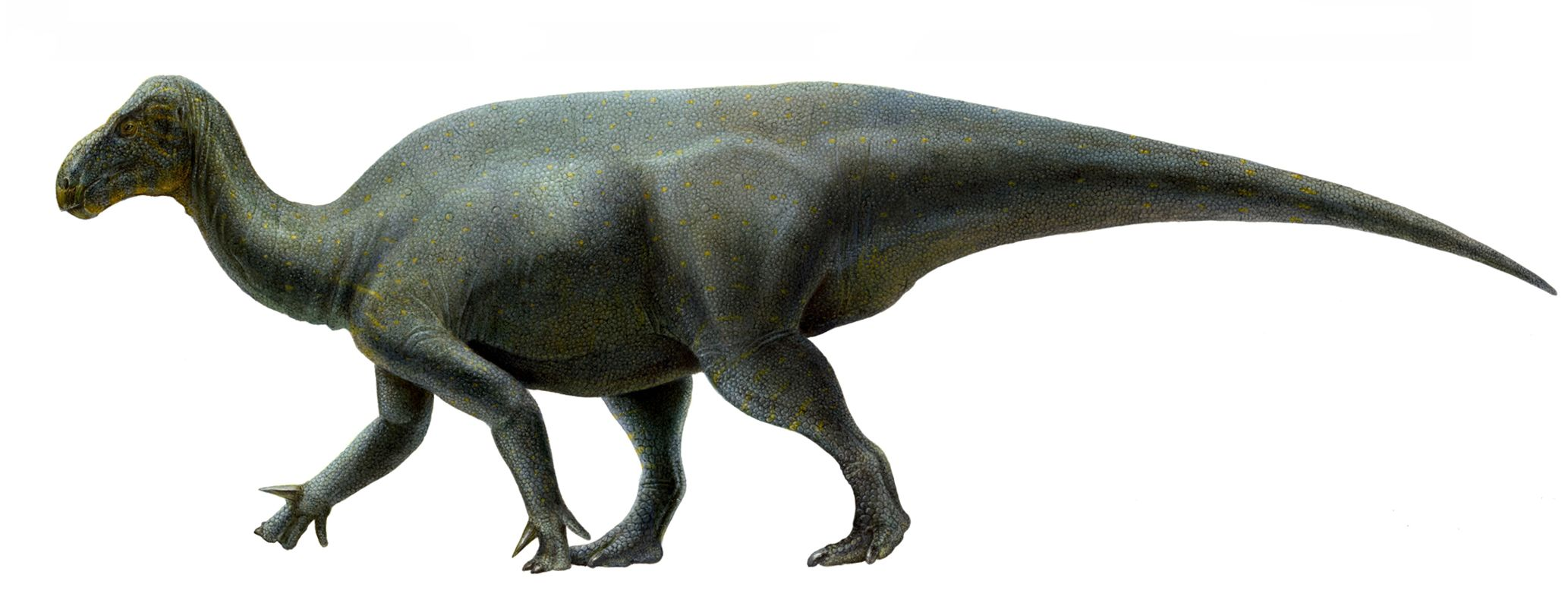

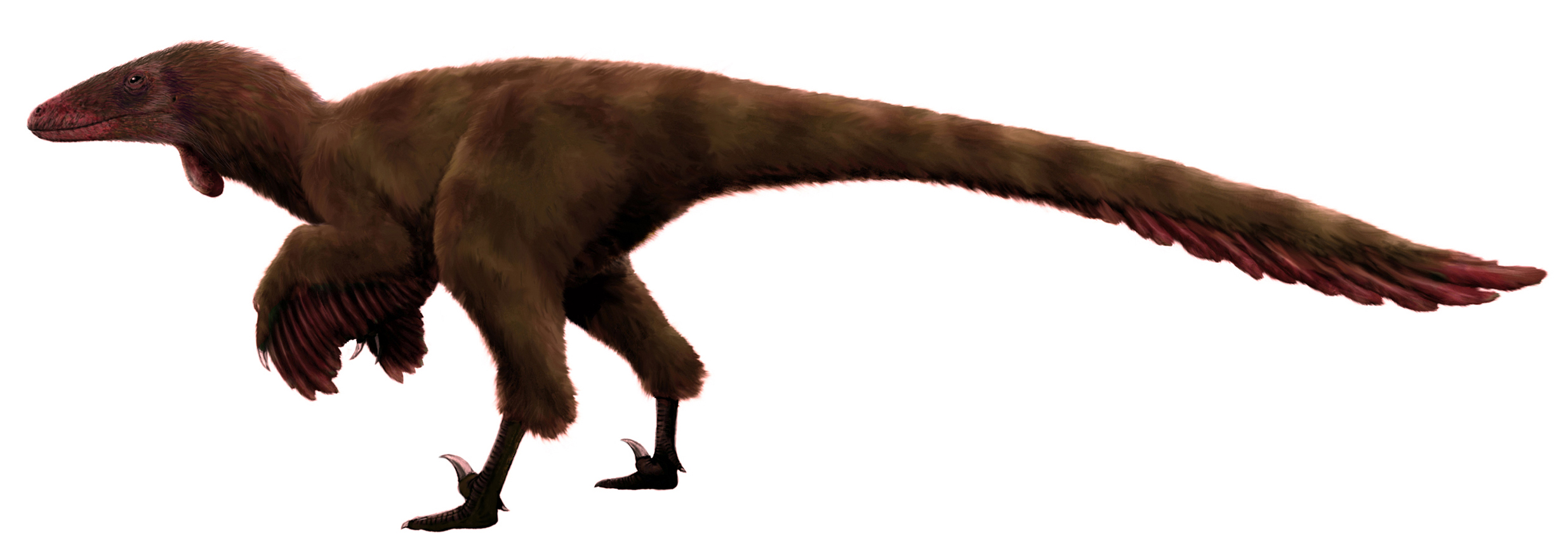
Iguanacolossus (top) and Yurgovuchia (bottom), two contemporaries of Mierasaurus

The Doelling's Bowl locality is part of the lower segment of the Yellow Cat Member of the Cedar Mountain Formation, as indicated by the presence of a marker horizon of calcrete. Traditionally, based on biostratigraphic correlation with ostracods and charophytes, the lower Yellow Cat Member has been considered to belong to the Aptian epoch of the Cretaceous period, at 124.2 ± 2.6 Ma (million years) old. However, based on uranium-lead dating of detrital zircon, this age has been more recently revised to less than ~139.7 ± 2.2 Ma, which is part of the Valanginian epoch. Detrital zircon dating provides only a maximum age, since the time between crystallization and deposition is unknown. The same dating measures produced two maximum age estimates of ~136.4 ± 1.1 Ma and ~132 Ma for the age of the upper segment. An older age of up to 142 Ma remains possible, as does a younger age around 124 Ma, which would be congruent with the ostracod and charophyte data.

Doelling's Bowl is the origin of the type specimen of the dromaeosaurid theropod Yurgovuchia. Additionally, in a layer about 25 centimetres (9.8 in) below the preserved feet of the type specimen of Mierasaurus, a large specimen of the iguanodontian ornithopod Iguanacolossus was uncovered along with some smaller individuals. Indeterminate bones from small ornithopods, as well as part of the tail of a large ornithopod, were mixed in with the remains of Mierasaurus as well. A large allosauroid theropod is represented by teeth, and a new species of polacanthine ankylosaurian has also been found. Non-dinosaurs are represented by skull fragments and teeth from possibly goniopholididae crocodyliforms, as well as shell fragments of a turtle similar to Naomichelys. The area was a waterlogged bog-like environment, judging by the plastic deformation of the bones, the presence of horizontal root systems, and the better-preserved condition of the top surfaces of the bones (which suggests that invertebrates grazed on the bottom surfaces).

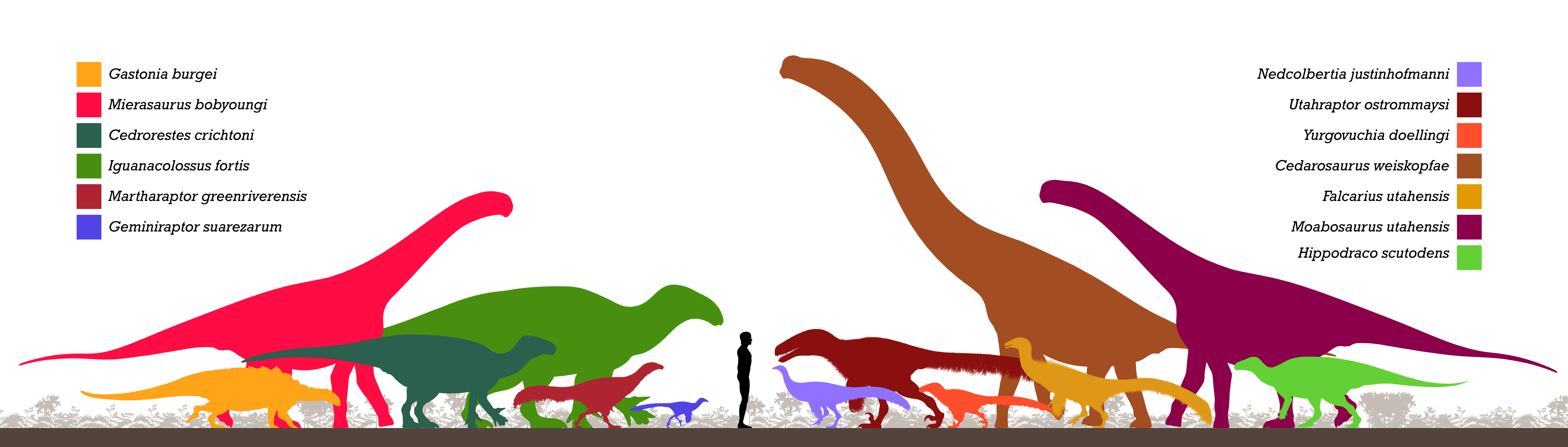
Mierasaurus compared to the fauna of the Yellow Cat Member from the Cedar Mountain Formation (Mierasaurus in fuchsia)

=== Paleobiogeography ===
Asides from Mierasaurus and Moabosaurus, turiasaurs are exclusively Jurassic in age; turiasaurs had previously been considered to have gone extinct at the Jurassic-Cretaceous boundary. However, turiasaurs are not known from the Jurassic-aged (more specifically, dating to the Tithonian epoch) deposits of the Morrison Formation, or from any other equivalent deposits in western (Laramidian) North America. This means that they may have reached North America at some point after the Tithonian, although the possibility that they were present but have not been found cannot be excluded. It is also possible that they were present in eastern (Appalachian) North America in the Late Jurassic, and spread to Laramidian North America subsequently. However, the presence of Mierasaurus in Valanginian deposits correlates with a substantial drop in sea level that occurred during the epoch, which may have formed a land bridge and allowed turiasaurs - and potentially other groups, such as haramiyidan mammals - to spread from Europe to North America.

== See also ==
- 2017 in archosaur paleontology
