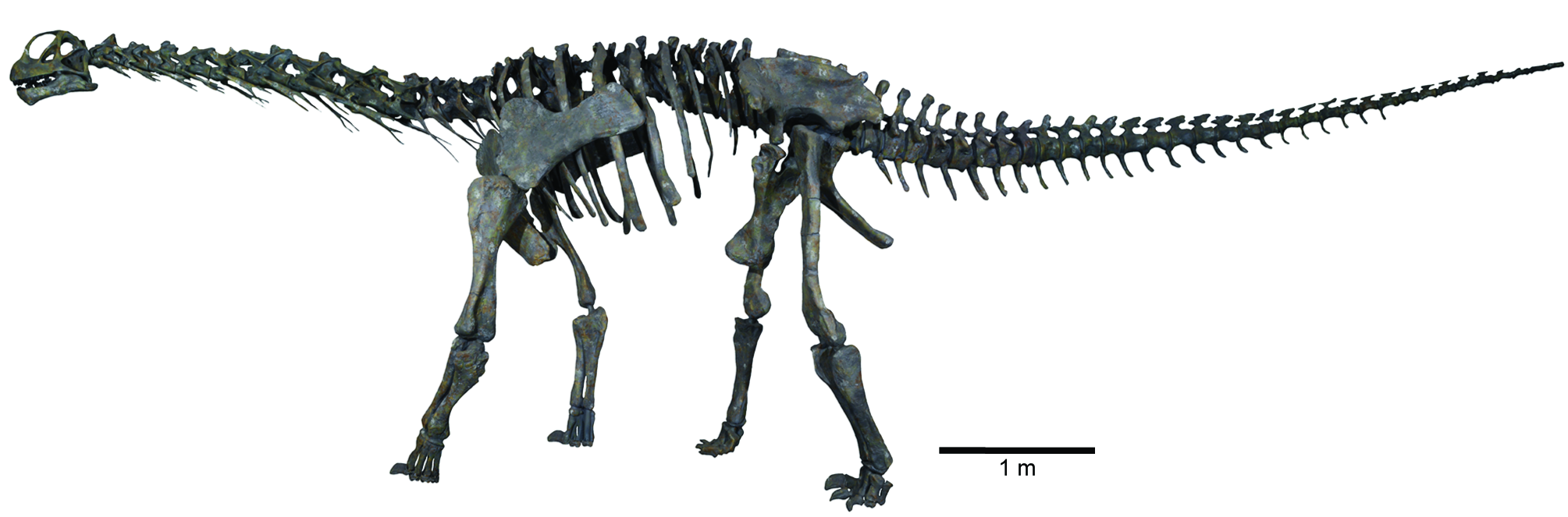
- Skeletal mount with skull based on Camarasaurus

Scientific classification
- Kingdom: Animalia
- Phylum: Chordata
- Class: Reptilia
- Clade: Dinosauria
- Clade: Saurischia
- Clade: †Sauropodomorpha
- Clade: †Sauropoda
- Clade: †Turiasauria
- Genus: †Moabosaurus; Britt et al., 2017

Type species
- †Moabosaurus utahensis Britt et al., 2017

= Moabosaurus =

Moabosaurus Temporal range: Early Cretaceous, Aptian

Extinct genus of dinosaurs

Moabosaurus (meaning "Moab reptile") is a genus of turiasaurian sauropod dinosaur from the Early Cretaceous Cedar Mountain Formation of Utah, United States.

== Description ==
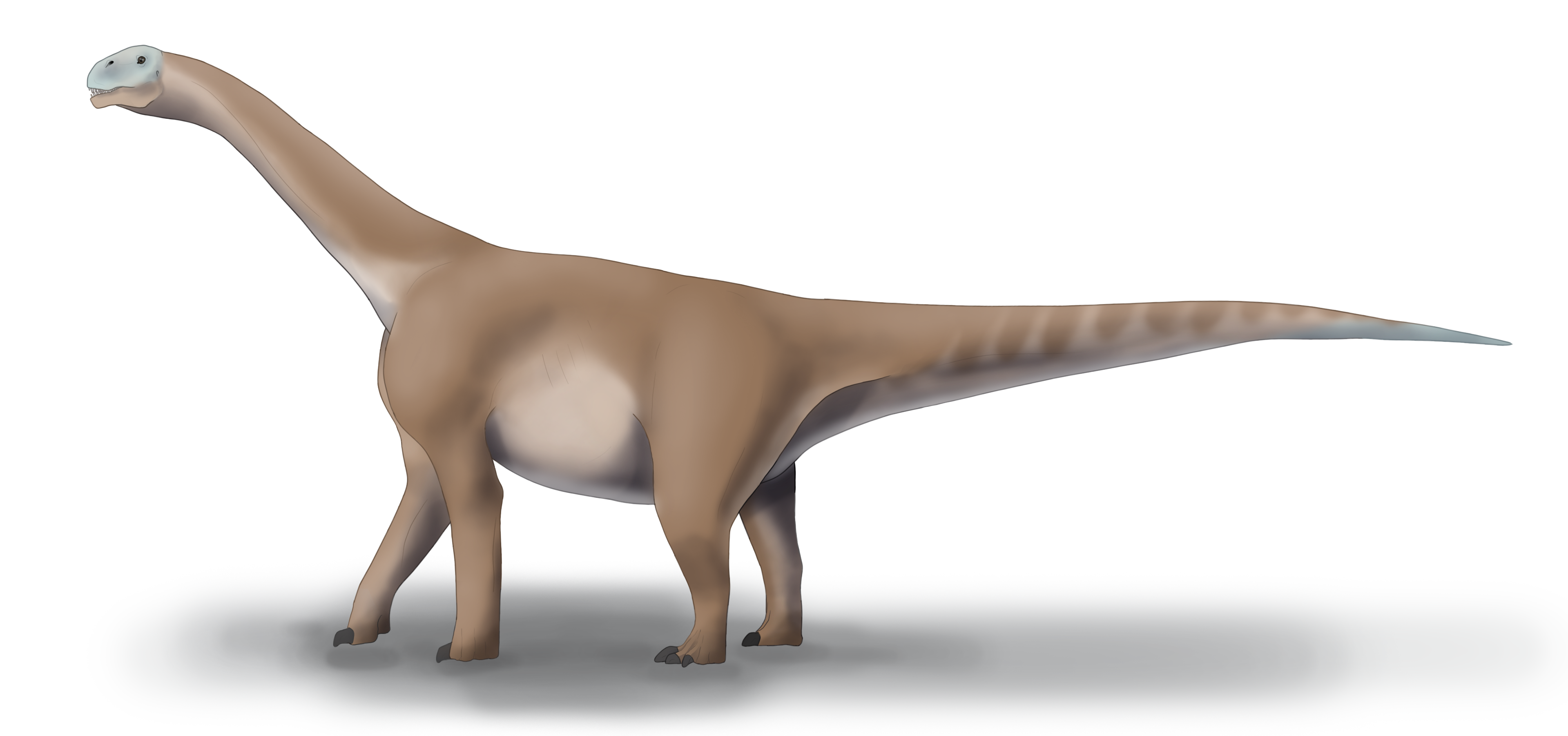
Life restoration of Moabosaurus utahensis

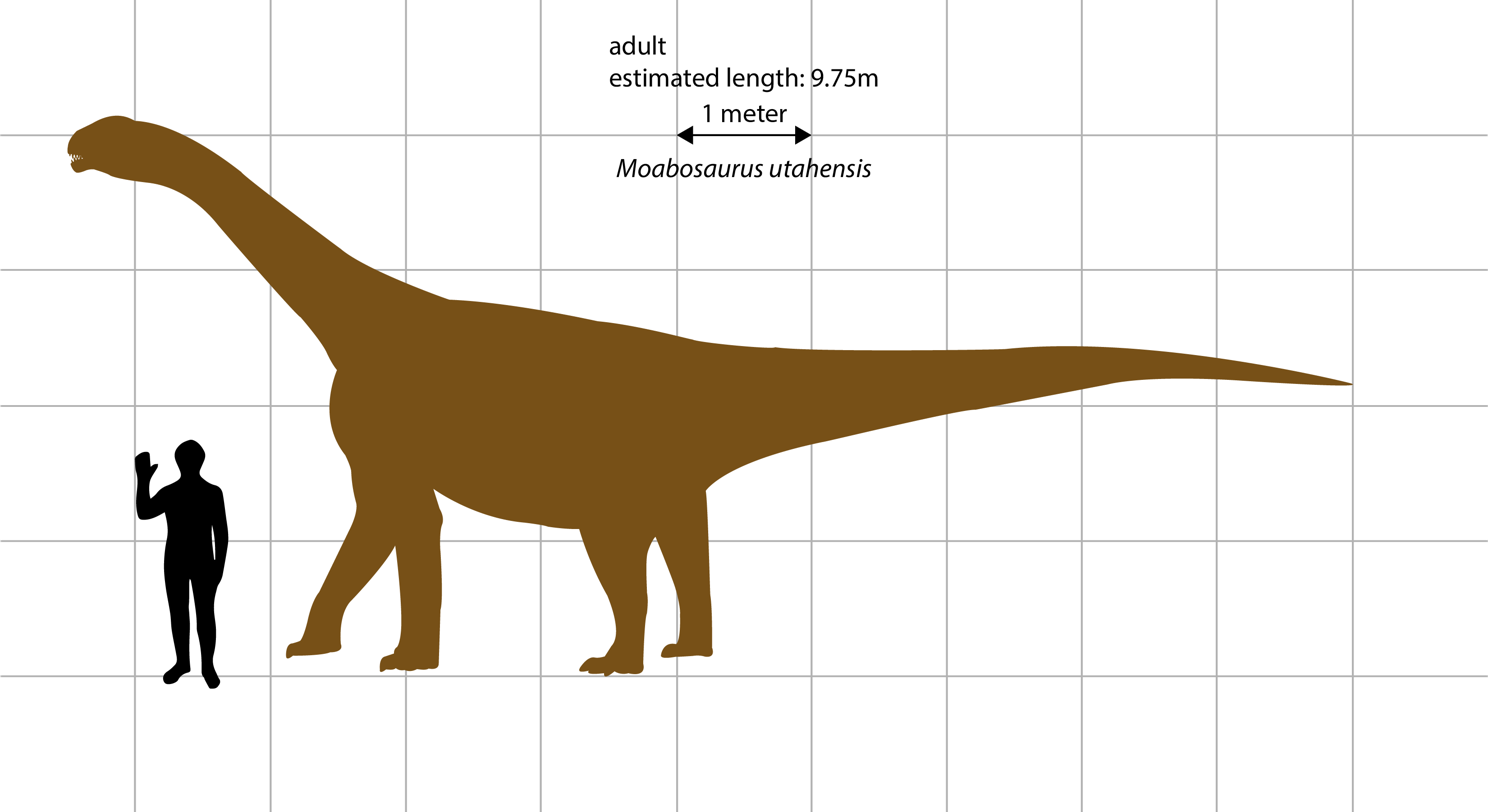
Moabosaurus compared to an average human adult

Moabosaurus is characterized by a suite of features including: extremely low neural spines that are thin, transverse ridges in the posterior cervical vertebrae and anterior dorsal vertebrae; strongly procoelous proximal and distal caudal vertebrae; and an ulna with well-developed lateral and medial anteroproximal ridges combined with a large olecranon process.

According to the 2017 article which officially named and described Moabosaurus, the animal was said to reach 10 meters (32.8 feet) long. However, the specimens which were examined belonged to juveniles and sub-adults, so it's possible that the creature measured longer when fully-grown.

== Discovery and naming ==
Moabosaurus was collected from the Dalton Wells Quarry, which is about 20 km northwest of Moab, Utah. Between 1975 and 2005, the quarry produced parts of at least 18 individuals of Moabosaurus based on the number of braincases present, totalling over 5,500 bones. Many of the recovered bones are fragmentary due to intense trampling as evidenced by breakage and trample scratches. Another factor that degraded the bones before burial was consumption by insects. Insects, probably beetle larvae, consumed portions of the bones that were in contact with the ground, as evidenced by burrows and mandible marks. Later, the bones were transported a short distance by a stream and buried in sediments reworked from the underlying Morrison Formation. Detrital zircon crystals from the Dalton Wells Quarry yield an age of 125 million years, indicating Moabosaurus is Aptian in age. Brooks B. Britt, Rodney D. Scheets, Michael F. Whiting, and D. Ray Wilhite named Moabosaurus utahensis.

== Classification ==
Phylogenetic analyses in the describing article in 2017 indicated that Moabosaurus is a basal titanosauriform macronarian neosauropod. Unlike other titanosauriform sauropods it has thick-walled vertebrae with large pneumatic chambers (camerate-grade) as in basal macronarians and large, spatulate teeth, as in Camarasaurus. However, a second study which was made in 2017 placed it in the Turiasauria, thus outside of the Neosauropoda. With Turiasaurus it shares derived features of the braincase; bifurcated cervical (neck) ribs; extremely low neural spines on the cervical and anterior dorsal vertebrae; and strongly procoelous proximal caudal vertebrae.

== Paleoecology ==
The Dalton Wells quarry has also yielded specimens of Venenosaurus (a brachiosaurid sauropod), the theropod dinosaurs Utahraptor and Nedcolbertia, plus a tall-spined iguanodontian, and the ankylosaurian Gastonia. Non-dinosaurian taxa are rare at the quarry and are limited to fragments of a pterosaur, crocodilian, turtle, and a neochoristodere.

== See also ==
- 2017 in archosaur paleontology
