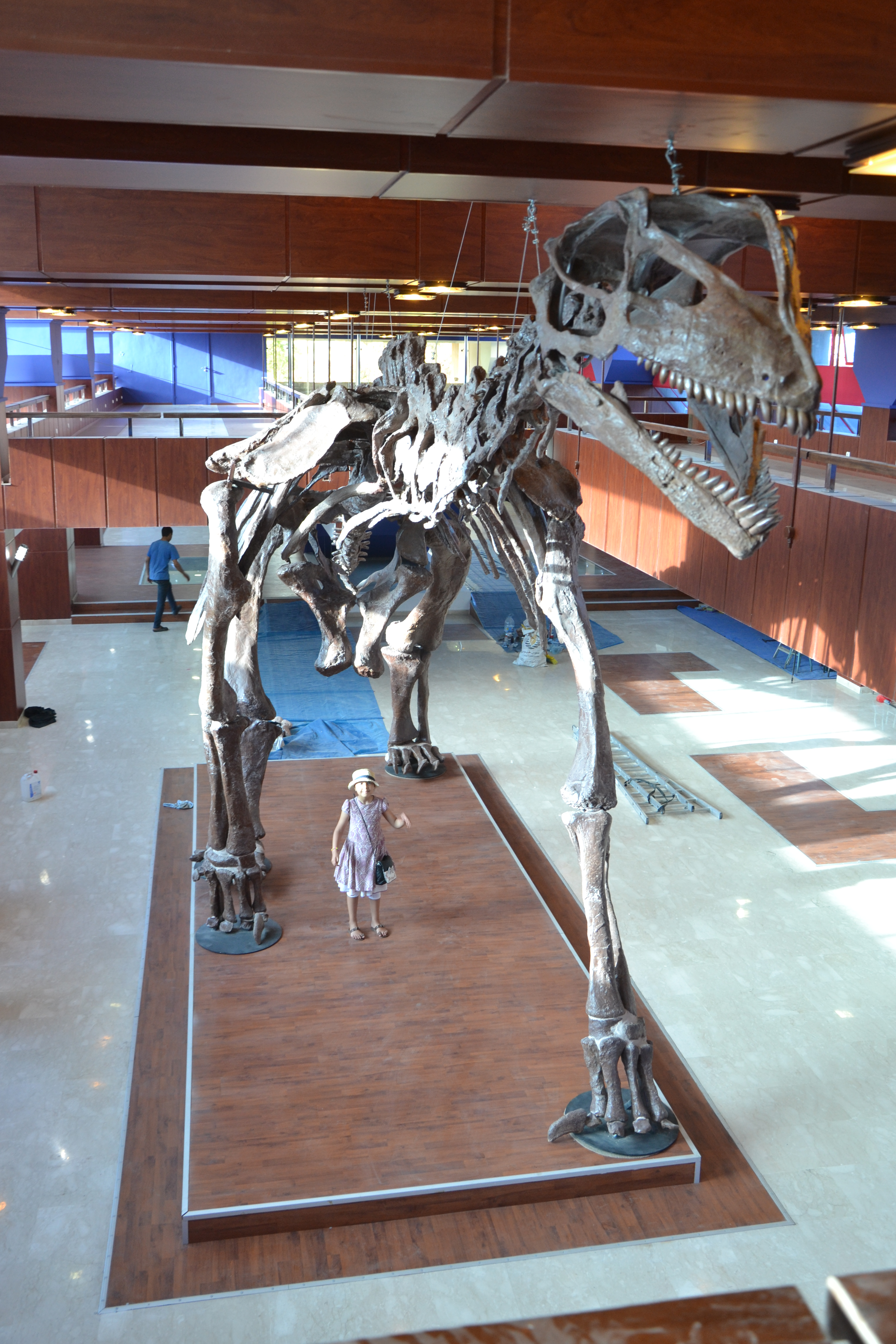
- Skeleton mounted in Rabat, Morocco

Scientific classification
- Kingdom: Animalia
- Phylum: Chordata
- Class: Reptilia
- Clade: Dinosauria
- Clade: Saurischia
- Clade: †Sauropodomorpha
- Clade: †Sauropoda
- Genus: †Atlasaurus; Monbaron, Russell, & Taquet, 1999
- Species: †A. imelakei

Binomial name
- †Atlasaurus imelakei Monbaron, Russell & Taquet, 1999

= Atlasaurus =

Atlasaurus Temporal range: Bathonian-Callovian, 167.7–164.7 Ma

Extinct genus of dinosaurs

Atlasaurus is a genus of sauropod dinosaurs from Middle Jurassic (Bathonian to Callovian stages) beds in North Africa.

== Discovery and naming ==
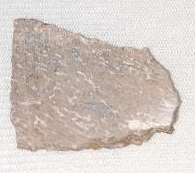
Bone fragment of Atlasaurus sp.

The Atlasaurus holotype was discovered in 1981 and was described by Monbaron, Russell & Taquet in 1999. It was named after the location of discovery in the High Atlas range of the Atlas Mountains of Morocco (where the Titan Atlas was said to hold up the heavens), and for the animal's size (about 15 m (49 ft) long). It is known from a nearly complete skeleton with a skull found at Wawmda, in the Middle Jurassic (Bathonian-Callovian) Guettioua Formation in Morocco's Azilal Province. The type species is Atlasaurus imelakei, the specific name coming from Arabic عملاق ("eimlaq" or "imelake"), meaning "giant".

A second specimen of A. imelakei, a near-complete tail, was also discovered in Morocco and was pieced back together in Utah after 300 hours of preparation. It was eventually sent to Mexico and was put on display in the lobby of the BBVA Bancomer tower in Mexico City until it was auctioned off to an anonymous businessman in January 2018 to pay for the rebuilding of schools destroyed during the 2017 Puebla earthquake.

Numerous fragments from several individuals have also been reported from the Guettioua Formation.

== Description ==
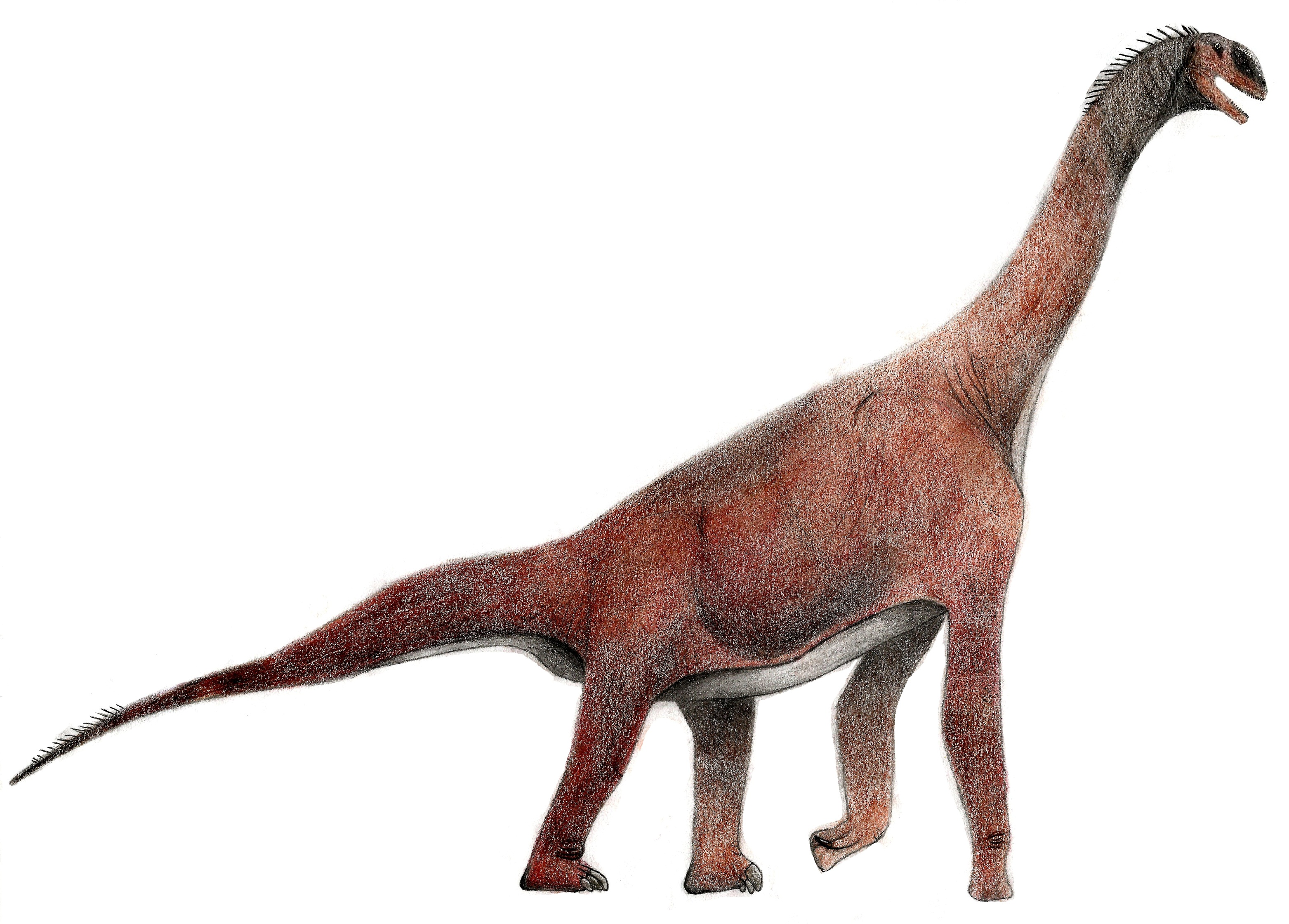
Restoration

Atlasaurus differs from its relative Brachiosaurus due to the estimated length of the dorsal vertebral column (assuming 12 vertebrae, 3.04 m (10.0 ft)), having a proportionately larger skull, a shorter neck (with at least 13 cervical vertebrae, shorter and more uniform in length than Brachiosaurus), a longer tail and more elongated limbs (humerus to femur ratio: 0.99; ulna to tibia ratio: 1.15). The teeth are spoon-shaped and have denticles. The lower jaw of Atlasaurus is about 69 centimetres (27 in) long, the neck was about 3.86 metres (12.7 ft) long, the humerus 1.95 metres (6 ft 5 in) long, and the femur about 2 metres (6 ft 7 in) long. It has been estimated at 15 metres (49 ft) in length, and 22.5 tonnes (22.1 long tons; 24.8 short tons) in weight.

== Classification ==
It was classified as a relatively primitive sauropod identified as a "cetiosaur" when first discovered, although upon further study, Atlasaurus appears to be closer to Brachiosaurus than to any other known sauropod based on detailed similarities between the vertebral column and limbs. However, more recent analyses have considered it to be a putative member of the Turiasauria. The most recent analysis of turiasaurs recovers Atlasaurus as a Brachiosaurid
