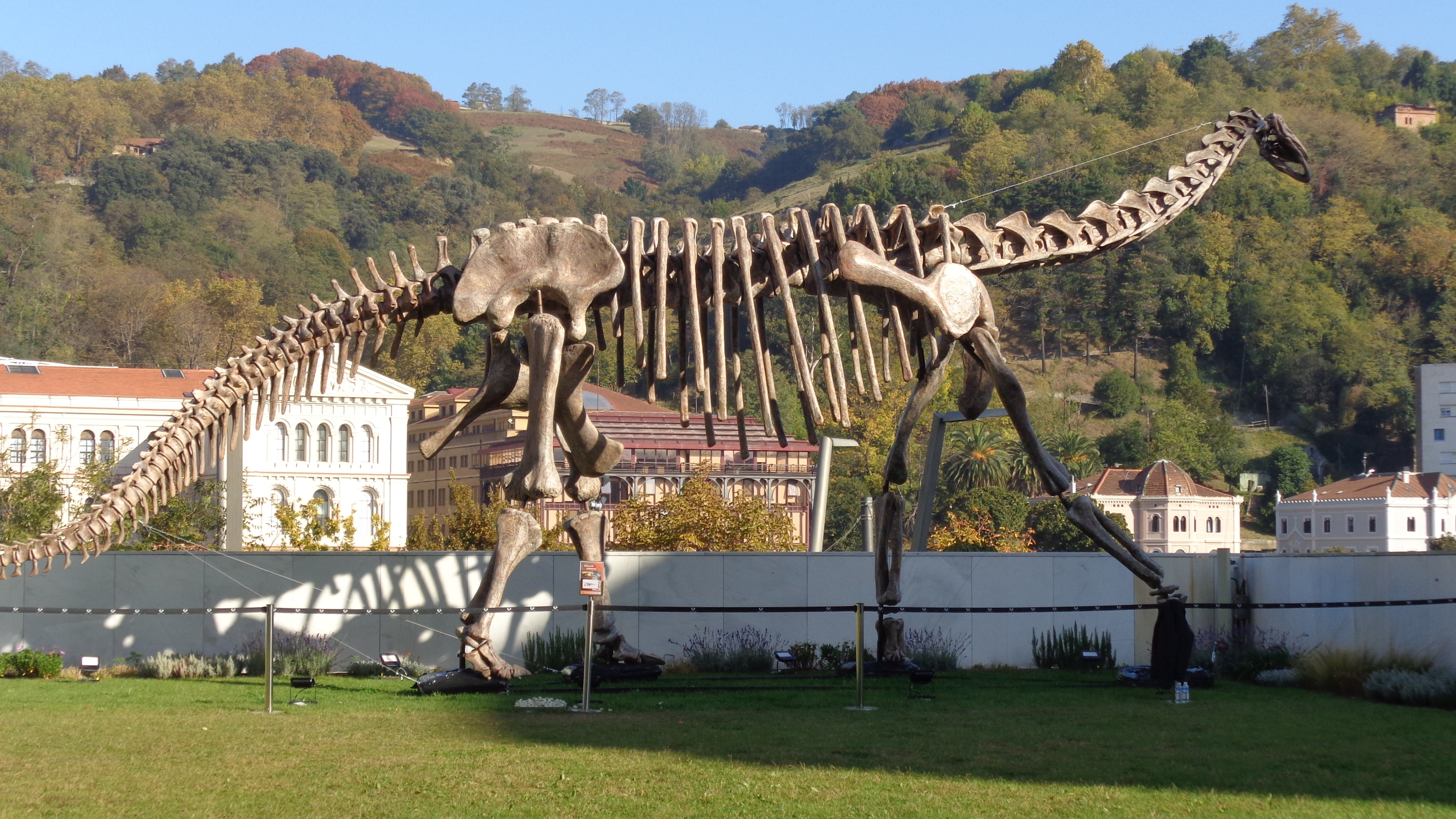
- Mounted replica skeleton

Scientific classification
- Kingdom: Animalia
- Phylum: Chordata
- Class: Reptilia
- Clade: Dinosauria
- Clade: Saurischia
- Clade: †Sauropodomorpha
- Clade: †Sauropoda
- Clade: †Eusauropoda
- Clade: †Turiasauria
- Genus: †Turiasaurus; Royo Torres et al. 2006
- Species: †T. riodevensis

Binomial name
- †Turiasaurus riodevensis Royo Torres et al. 2006

= Turiasaurus =

Turiasaurus Temporal range: Kimmeridgian-Tithonian ~155–146 Ma

Extinct genus of dinosaurs

Turiasaurus (meaning "Turia lizard") is a genus of sauropod dinosaurs. It is known from a multiple fossil specimens representing the species Turiasaurus riodevensis, found in the Kimmeridgian Villar del Arzobispo Formation of Teruel, Spain.

== Description ==
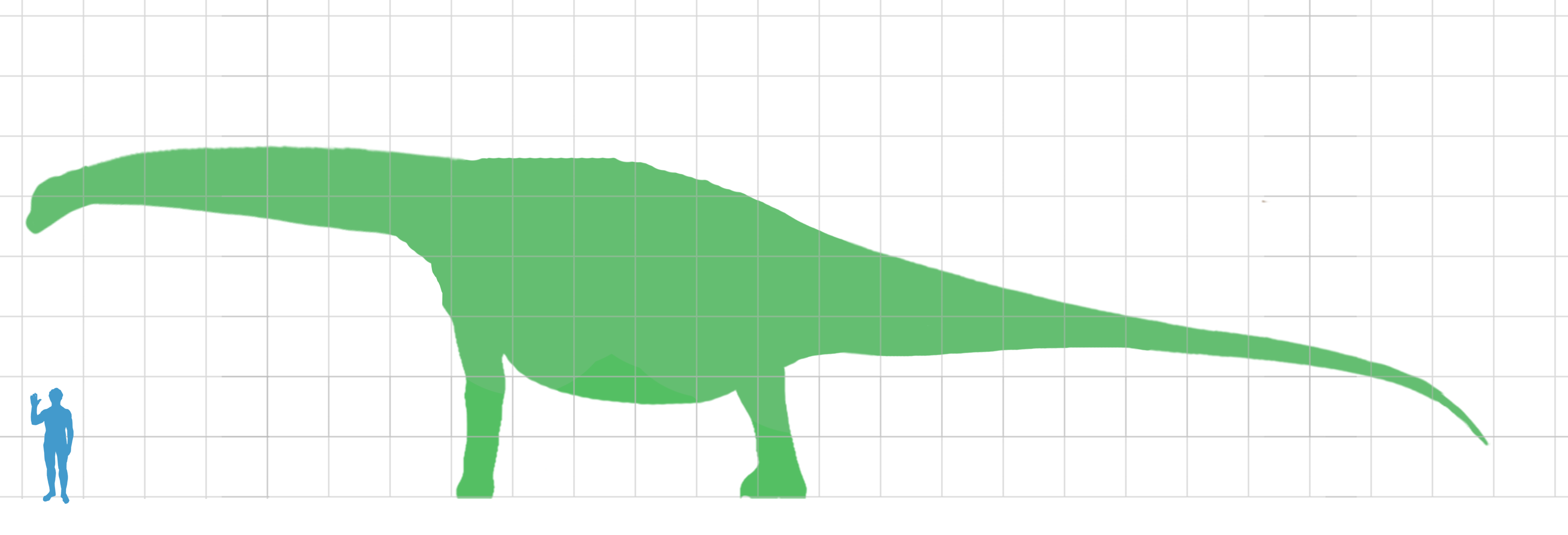
Size compared with a human

It is believed to be the largest dinosaur ever found in Europe, and is among the largest dinosaurs known. It was originally estimated at over 30 metres (98 ft), possibly around 36–39 metres (118–128 ft) in length and with a weight of 40–48 t (44–53 short tons). More recent estimates suggest a length of 25–30 metres (82–98 ft) in length, but a comparable weight of 40–51 t (44–56 short tons). The length of its skull is 70 centimetres, which is not too large. According to the paleontologist Luis Alcalá, this is because a larger head might have caused Turiasaurus to break its neck. Its femur was some 2.2 metres (7.2 ft) in length.

Phylogenetic analysis shows that Turiasaurus lies outside of the Neosauropoda division and belongs to a new clade, Turiasauria, together with Losillasaurus and Galvesaurus.

== History ==
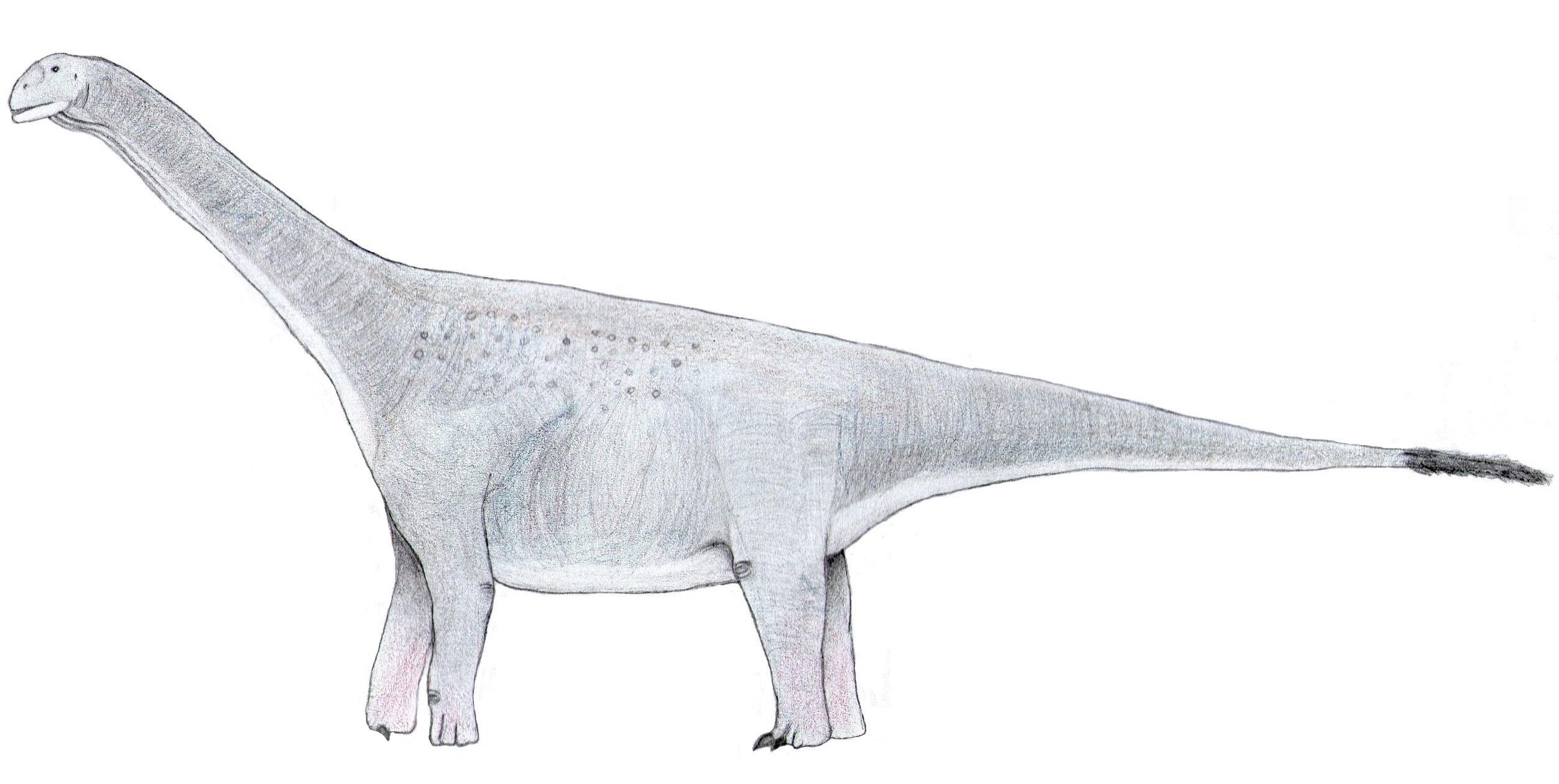
Life restoration

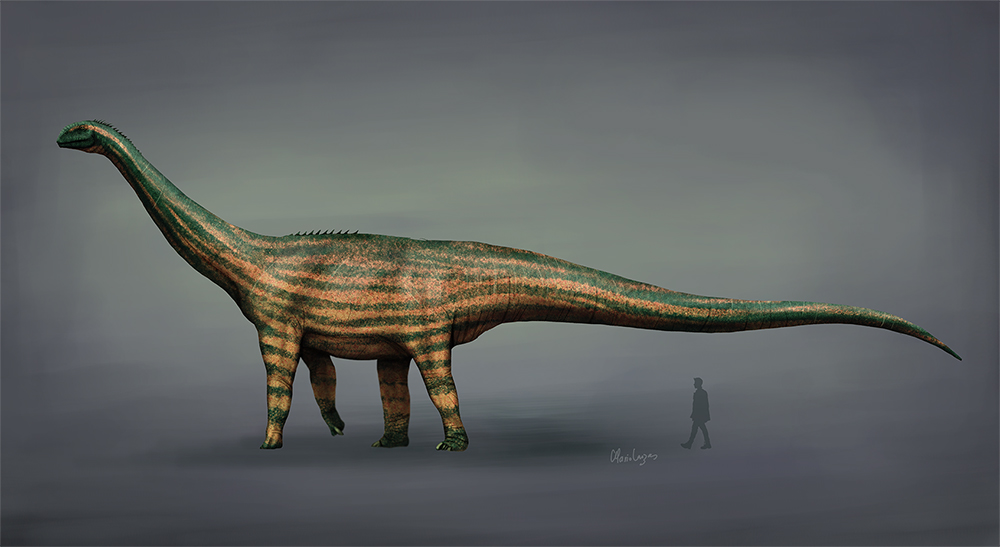
Alternate reconstruction

Fragmentary remains of this animal, including an articulated left forelimb (holotype), skull fragments, teeth, vertebrae and ribs, have been found in terrestrial deposits of the Villar del Arzobispo Formation of Riodeva (Teruel Province, Spain). A forelimb from Portugal is now seen as Zby atlanticus. The type species, Turiasaurus riodevensis, was formally described by Royo-Torres, Cobos & Alcala, in 2006. In the early 2010s, excavations were made east of Madrid that uncovered the most complete fossil of such creatures in the whole world. The material referred to Turiasaurus comes from multiple individuals across multiple different localities.
