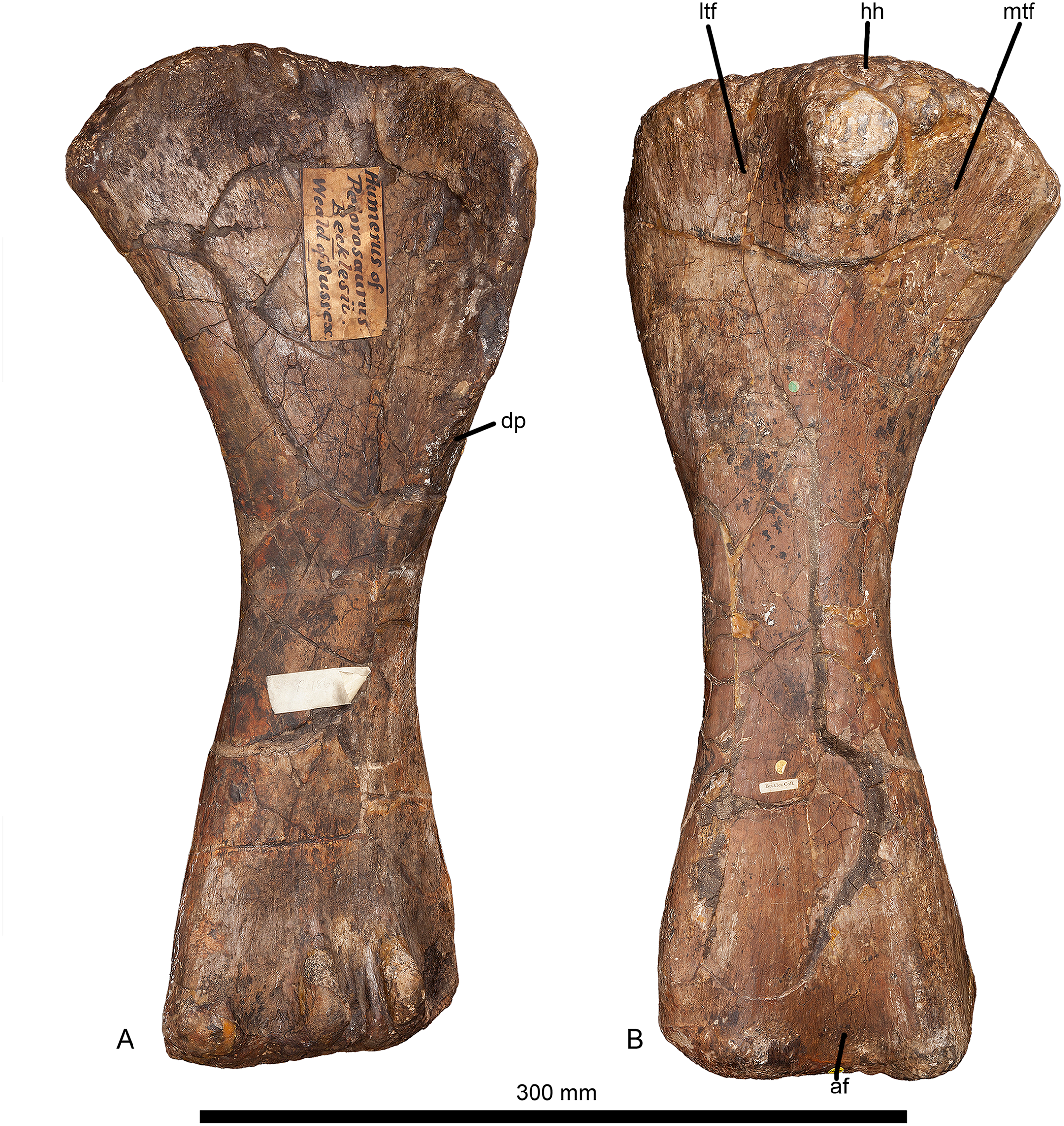
- Left humerus of the type specimen

Scientific classification
- Kingdom: Animalia
- Phylum: Chordata
- Class: Reptilia
- Clade: Dinosauria
- Clade: Saurischia
- Clade: †Sauropodomorpha
- Clade: †Sauropoda
- Clade: †Neosauropoda
- Clade: †Macronaria
- Genus: †Haestasaurus; Upchurch, Mannion, & Taylor, 2015
- Species: †H. becklesii

Binomial name
- †Haestasaurus becklesii (Mantell, 1852)

= Haestasaurus =

Haestasaurus Temporal range: Early Cretaceous, 140 Ma

Extinct genus of dinosaurs

Haestasaurus is a genus of herbivorous sauropod dinosaur, belonging to the Macronaria, that during the Early Cretaceous lived in the area of present-day England. The only species is Haestasaurus becklesii.

== Description ==
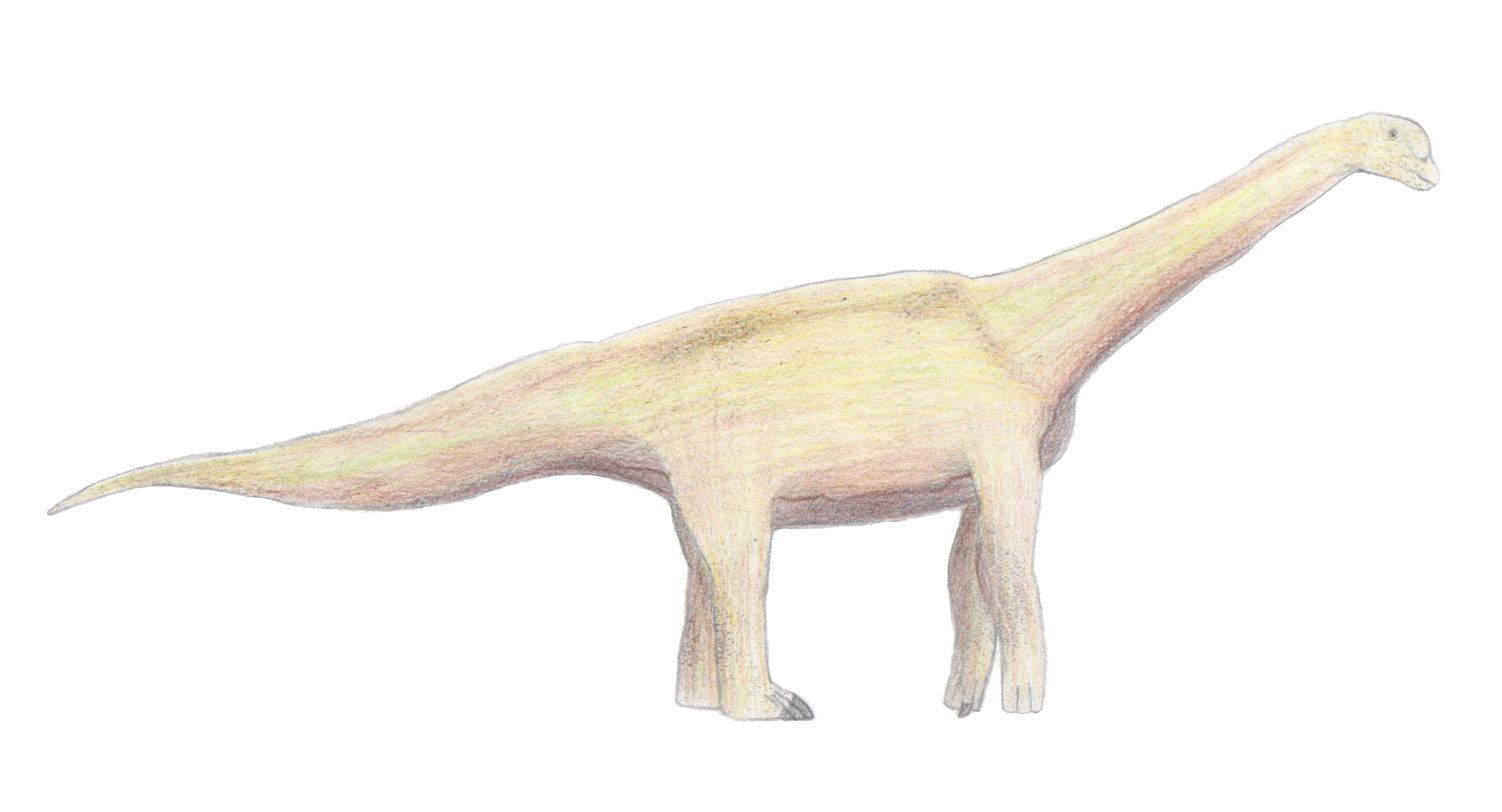
Life restoration.

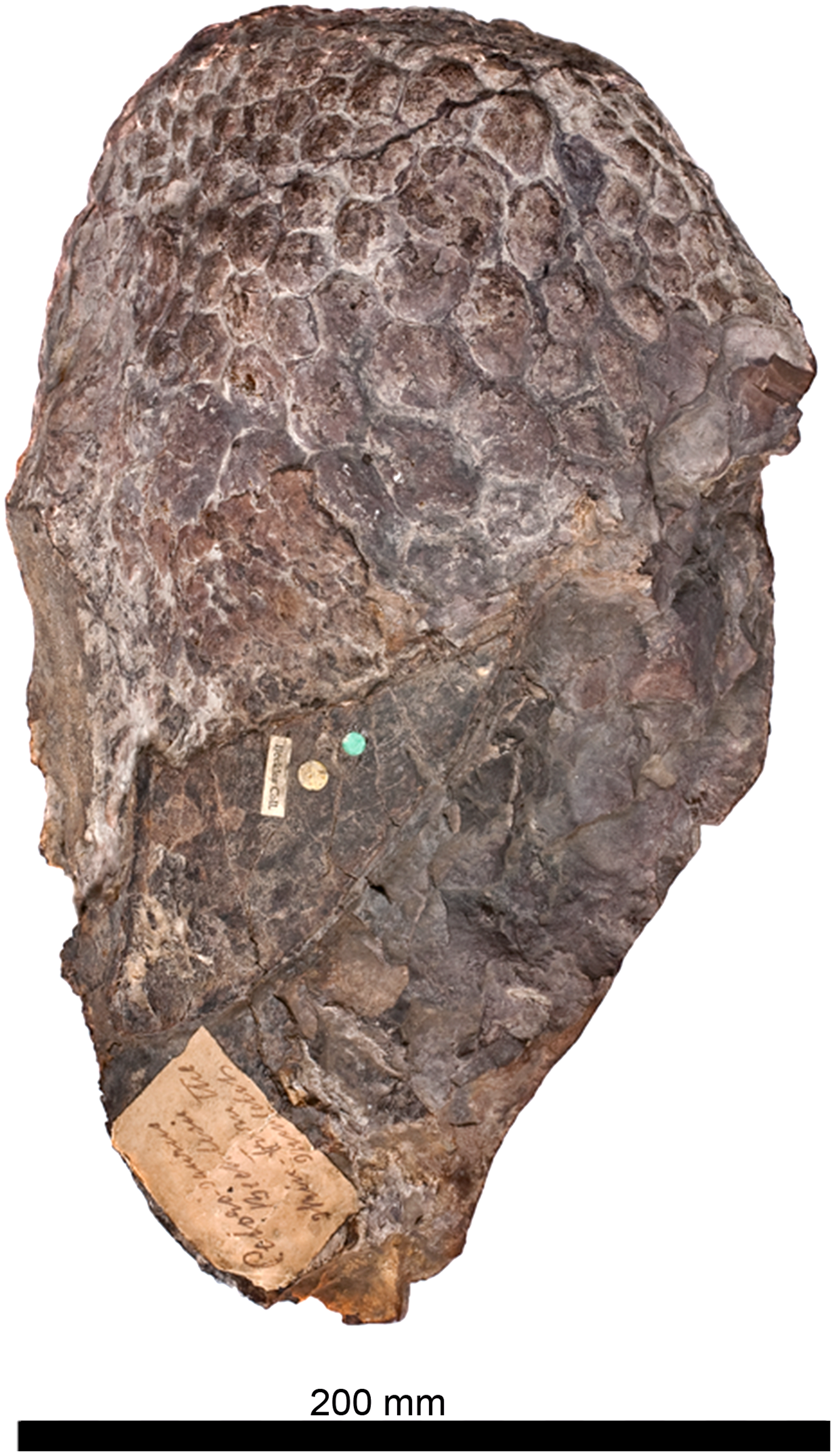
Skin impression

As a sauropod, Haestasaurus would have been a large quadrupedal long-necked dinosaur. Little information is available about the specifics of its build because only a forelimb is known of the animal.

An indication of the size of Haestasaurus is given by the length of the forelimb elements. The humerus is 599 millimetres long, the ulna 421 millimetres and the radius, situated next to the ulna in the lower arm, has a length of 404 millimetres.

A 2015 study found several unique anatomical traits (autapomorphies) distinguishing Haestasaurus from related species. The inner front corner of the humerus is protruding, forming a processus entepicondylaris anterior. Between the front condyles of the lower humerus two small vertical ridges are present. The upper surface of the radius has, measured from front to rear, its largest width along the outer rim, which edge is nearly straight instead of strongly convex. The lower front of the radius is lightly concave between outer and inner ridges. A unique combination is present of a robust ulna, its upper surface having a width equalling more than 40% of the shaft length, with a slender radius having an upper width of less than 30% of total length.

A rock associated with the forelimb, NHMUK R1868, was the first specimen known preserving parts of the sauropod skin. These probably are not impressions as the visible surface of the scales is convex, but natural casts. An area of 215 by 195 millimetres has been preserved. It shows non-overlapping hexagonal scales with a diameter of between ten and twenty-five millimetres. The scales gradually decrease in size, perhaps towards the elbow, to provide it greater flexibility. The scales strongly resemble skin impressions of later sauropod finds. In 2022 a study reported the presence of small covering protuberances or papillae on the scales. With Neosauropoda, these would have served for a better camouflage or thermoregulation. These structures had already been noted by Reginald Walter Hooley in 1917, but had incorrectly been identified as representing the underside of the epidermis.

== History of discovery and naming ==
In 1852, the collector Samuel Husband Beckles obtained a block of Wealden Sandstone that had become visible at low tide off the coast of East Sussex near Hastings. The precise location is today unknown. It proved to contain a large forelimb which was studied by Gideon Mantell. The same year, Mantell in a lecture named the find as a second species of Pelorosaurus: Pelorosaurus becklesii, the specific name honouring Beckles.

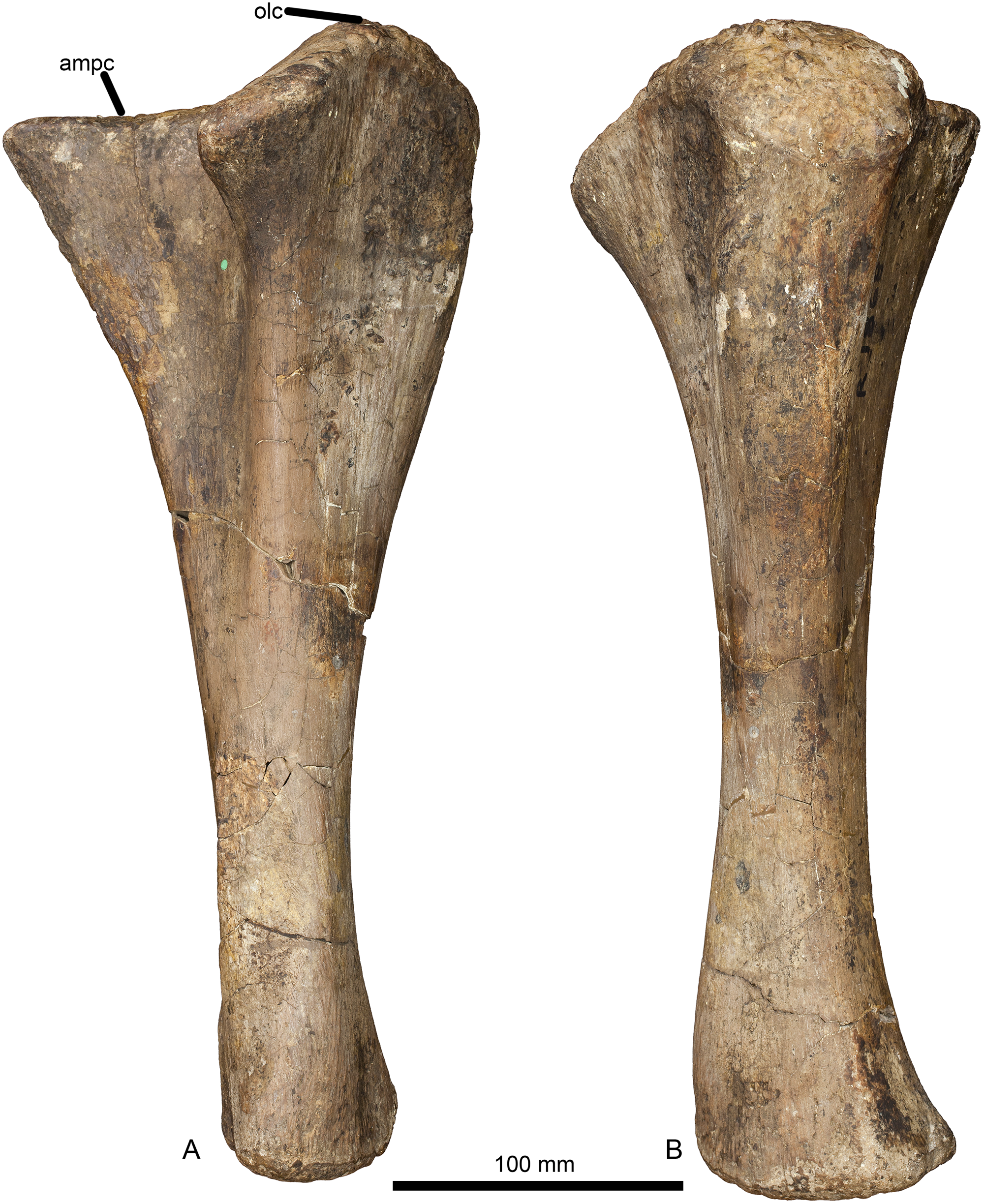
Left ulna

Pelorosaurus becklesii at first received little attention, perhaps also because the fossils remained in the private collection of Beckles; they were acquired by the British Museum (Natural History) in 1891. In 1888, Richard Lydekker described a cast present in the museum, BMNH R28701, but seemed to be unaware of its status as a separate species and misidentified the discovery site as the Isle of Wight. In 1889, the American paleontologist Othniel Charles Marsh coined the new combination Morosaurus becklesii. However, this was not accepted by Lydekker who in subsequent publications referred the material to Cetiosaurus brevis. In 1932, Friedrich von Huene concluded that P. becklesii represented a separate genus but provided no name, referring to it as "Gen. (?) becklesii", the question mark indicating an unknown genus that would have been a member of the Camarasaurinae within the Brachiosauridae. In 1990, John Stanton McIntosh confirmed that the species was not co-generic with Pelorosaurus conybeari.

In 2015, Paul Upchurch, Philip D. Mannion and Michael P. Taylor, having established that P. becklesii differed in many traits from Pelorosaurus conybeari and was not its sister species, named the separate genus Haestasaurus. The generic name is derived from Haesta, the presumed fifth century tribal Saxon chieftain whose existence has been deduced from the original name of Hastings, Haestingas, "the people of Haesta" (Old English hǣst ‘violence, violent’), and Greek sauros, "reptile". The combinatio nova is Haestasaurus becklesii. The type species remains Pelorosaurus becklesii. The name was published in an electronic journal, PLoS ONE. Such names require a Life Science Identifier which in this case is 9D2E9827-D6D5-444A-A01C-69CAE4FFCA22. Haestasaurus was one of eighteen dinosaur taxa from 2015 to be described in open access or free-to-read journals.

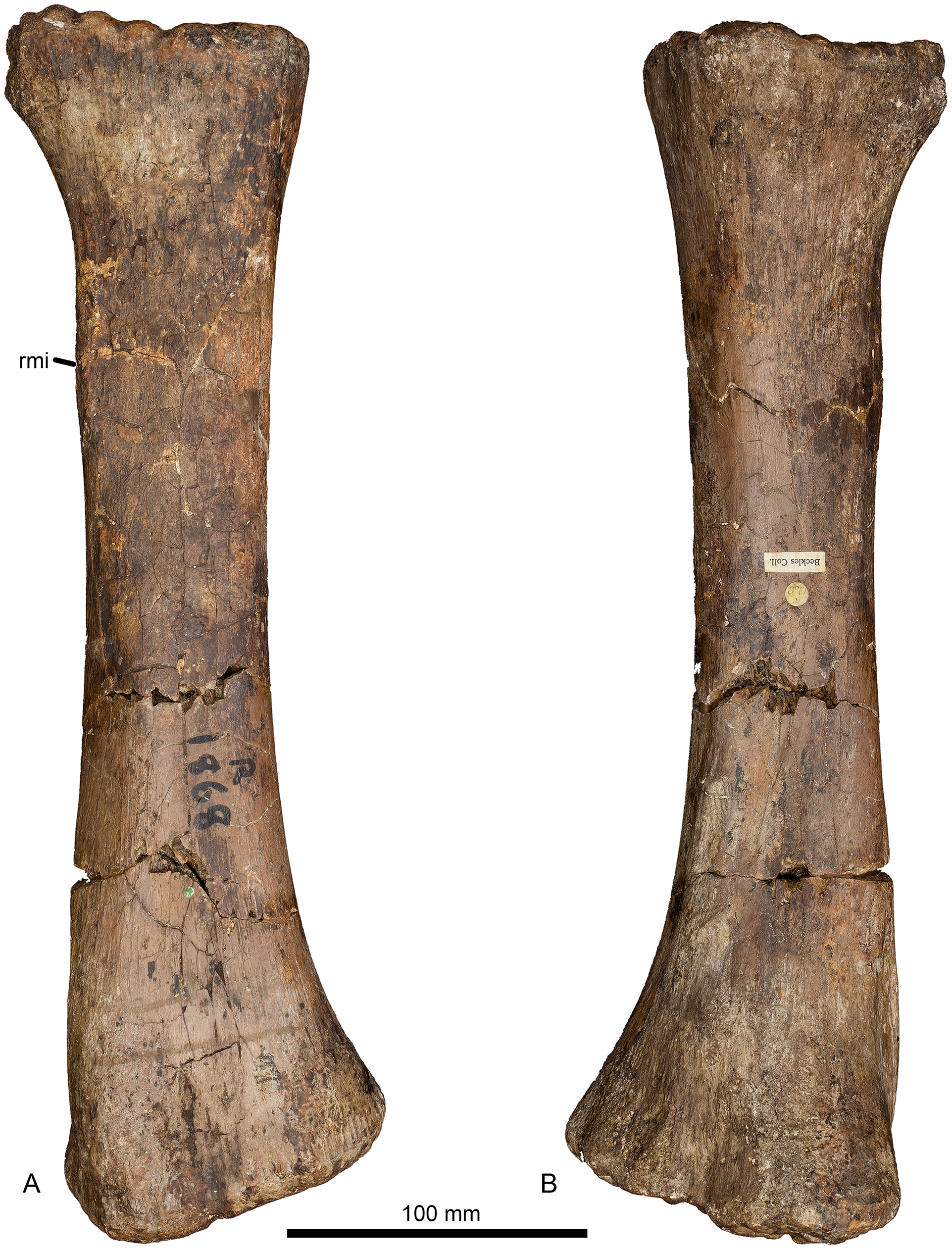
Left radius

The holotype, NHMUK R1870, was found in a layer of the Hastings Beds dating from the Berriasian-Valanginian, roughly 140 million years old. It consists of a left forelimb containing the associated humerus, ulna and radius. Specimen NHMUK R1868 was part of the original block and consists of a natural cast of a part of the skin, near the elbow. When the Beckles Collection was acquired, a metacarpal was referred to P. becklesii, specimen NHMUK R1869, but its large size precludes its belonging to the holotype.

== Classification ==
By the end of the twentieth century, most researchers agreed that P. becklesii was a member of the Titanosauriformes, possibly specifically within the Titanosauria. In the latter case it would have been one of the oldest known European titanosaurs. The 2015 study performed some detailed cladistic analyses to establish the exact position of Haestasaurus in the evolutionary tree. Due to the limited material available however, it proved impossible to obtain a single solution to this problem. Two major alternatives presented themselves. One possibility was that Haestasaurus was indeed a, basal, member of the Titanosauria. Alternatively, Haestasaurus was a basal member of the larger clade of the Macronaria, a close relative of Camarasaurus, Janenschia or Tehuelchesaurus. The authors favoured the last possibility because the traits pointing to a membership of the Titanosauria, such as a robust humerus and a robust ulna, could easily have been developed in a process of convergent evolution, as adaptations for weight-bearing. Haestasaurus would then represent a rare late-surviving basal macronarian.
