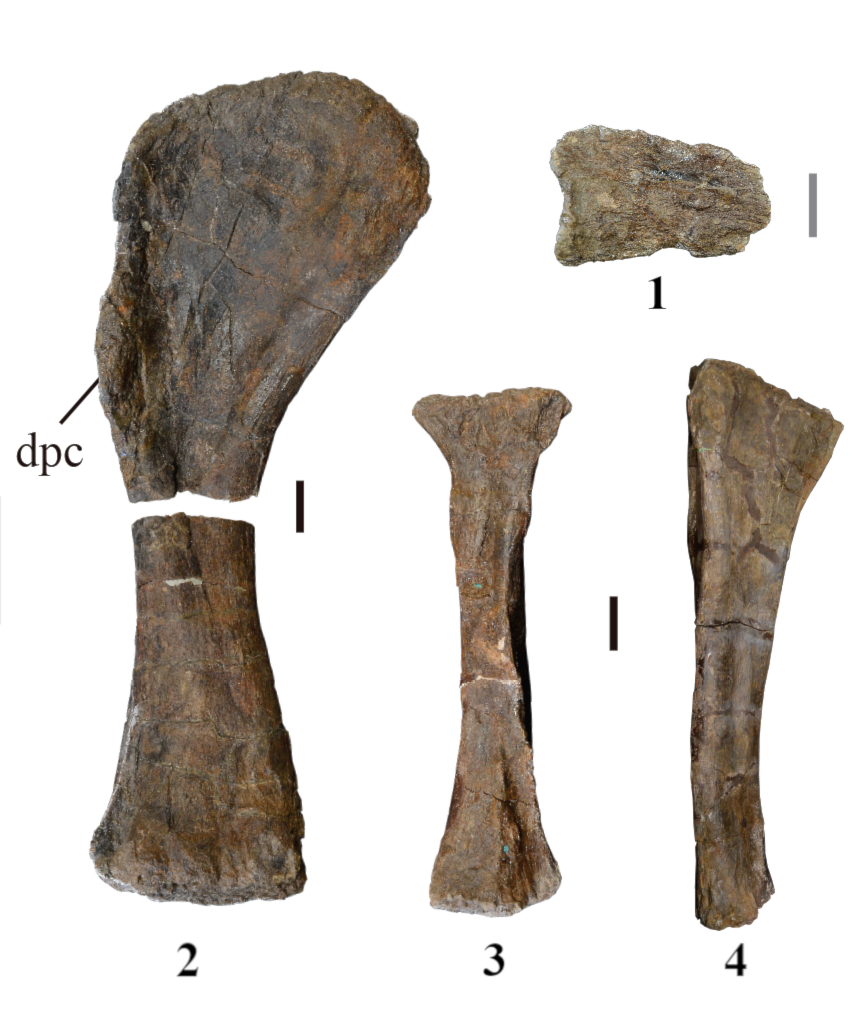
- Holotype fossils.

Scientific classification
- Kingdom: Animalia
- Phylum: Chordata
- Class: Reptilia
- Clade: Dinosauria
- Clade: Saurischia
- Clade: †Sauropodomorpha
- Clade: †Sauropoda
- Clade: †Eusauropoda
- Clade: †Turiasauria
- Genus: †Zby; Mateus, Mannion & Upchurch, 2014

Type species
- †Zby atlanticus Mateus, Mannion & Upchurch, 2014

= Zby =

Zby Temporal range: Late Jurassic, Kimmeridgian

Genus of sauropod dinosaur

Zby is an extinct genus of turiasaurian sauropod dinosaur known from the Late Jurassic, particularly late Kimmeridgian stage of the Lourinhã Formation, in central west Portugal. It contains a single species, Zby atlanticus. It is named after Georges Zbyszewski, who studied the geology and paleontology of Portugal.

== Discovery and naming ==
Zby is known solely from its holotype, a closely associated partial skeleton including a complete tooth with root, a fragment of cervical neural arch, an anterior chevron, and an almost complete right pectoral girdle and forelimb. It was discovered in 1996 in the Lourinhã Formation, Portugal by Octávio Mateus.

Zby was first described and named by Octávio Mateus, Philip D. Mannion and Paul Upchurch in 2014 and the type species is Zby atlanticus, although it was initially thought to be Turiasaurus riodevensis.

== Description ==
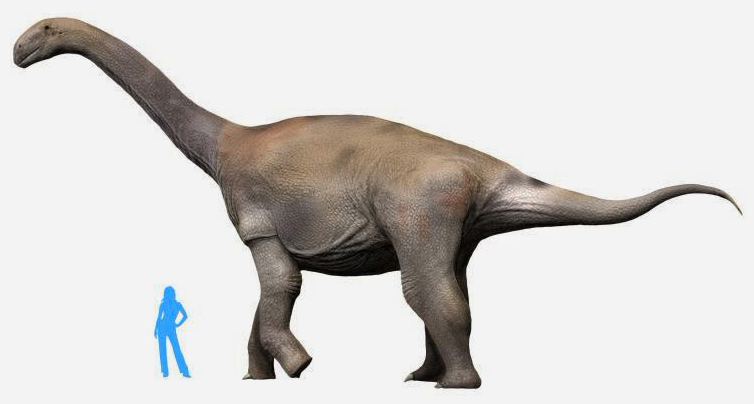
Life reconstruction of Zby atlanticus and size comparison.

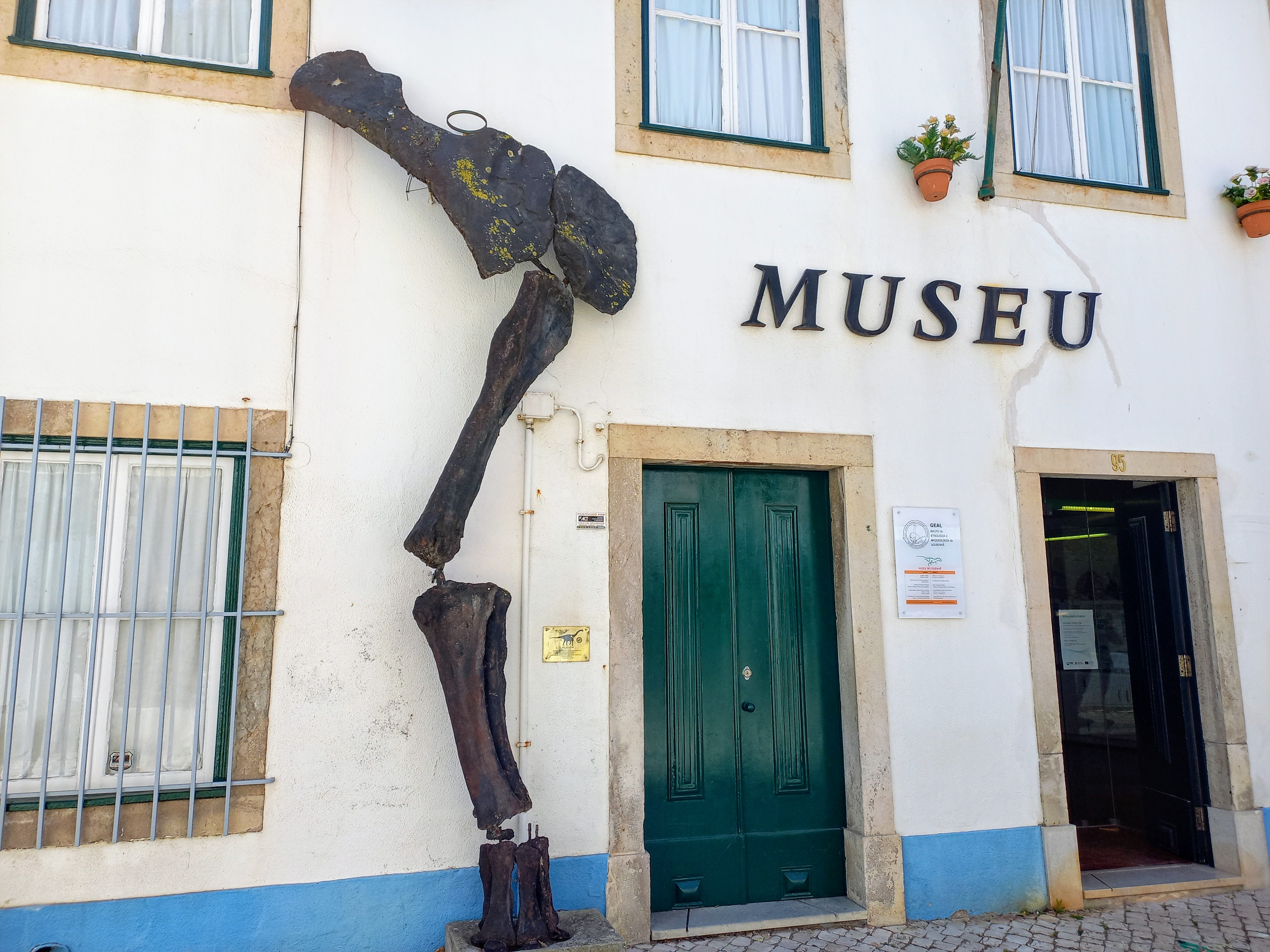
Entrance of the Museu da Lourinhã, with the cast of the forelimb of Zby.

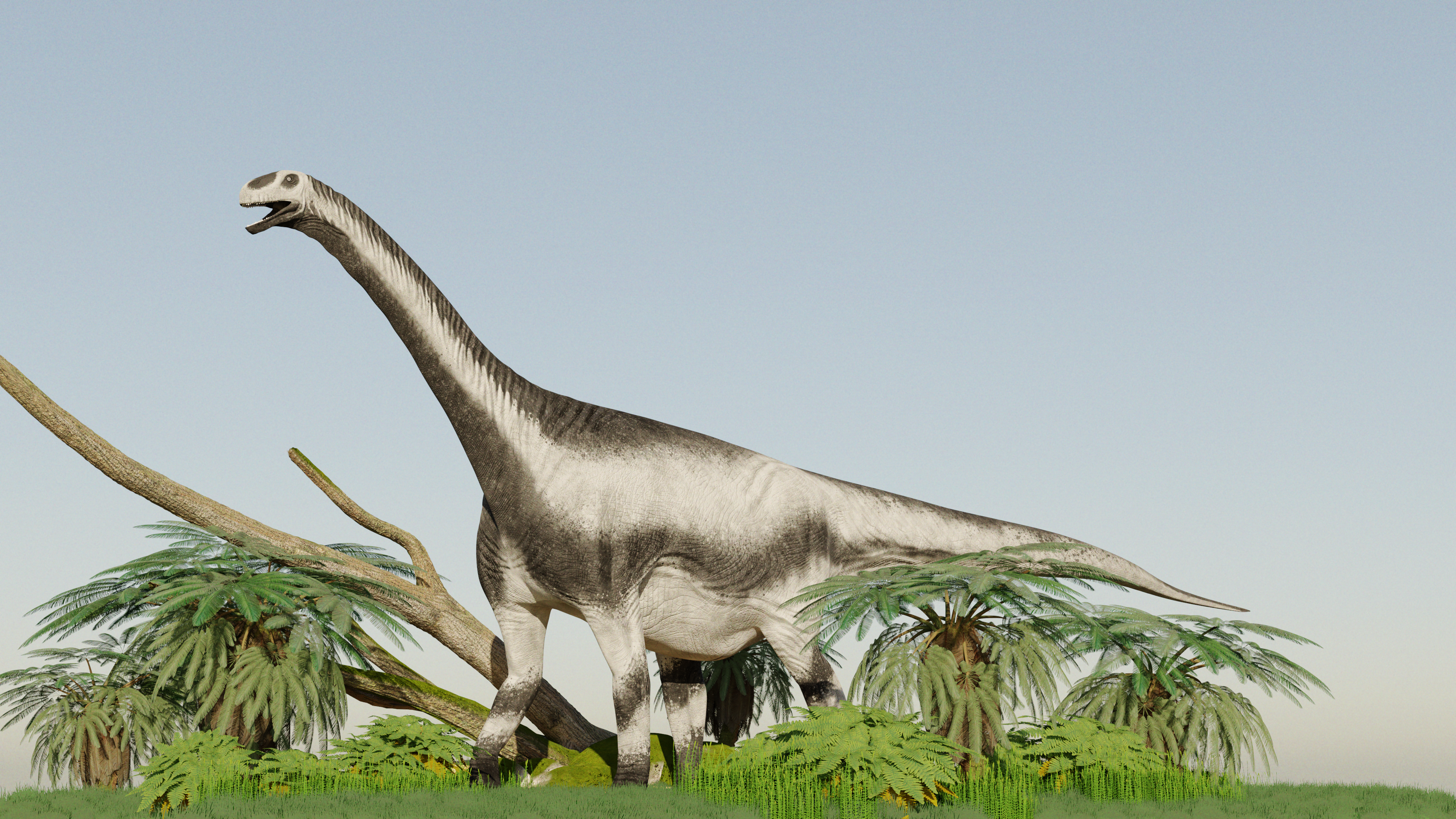
Reconstruction of Zby ( Author name: Ferrutxo)

Zby is differentiated from other sauropods based on four autapomorphies, including a prominent posteriorly projecting ridge on the humerus at the level of the deltopectoral crest. Zby is suggested to be closely related to T. riodevensis from Spain and Portugal, based on its tooth morphology, extreme anteroposterior compression of the proximal end of the radius, and strong beveling of the lateral half of the distal end of the radius, while some other forelimb traits distinguish these two genera. Nearly all other anatomical features suggest that Zby is a non-neosauropod eusauropod, confirming its position as a turiasaurian. Zby is estimated to measure around 15 to 18 metres (49 to 59 ft) in length.
