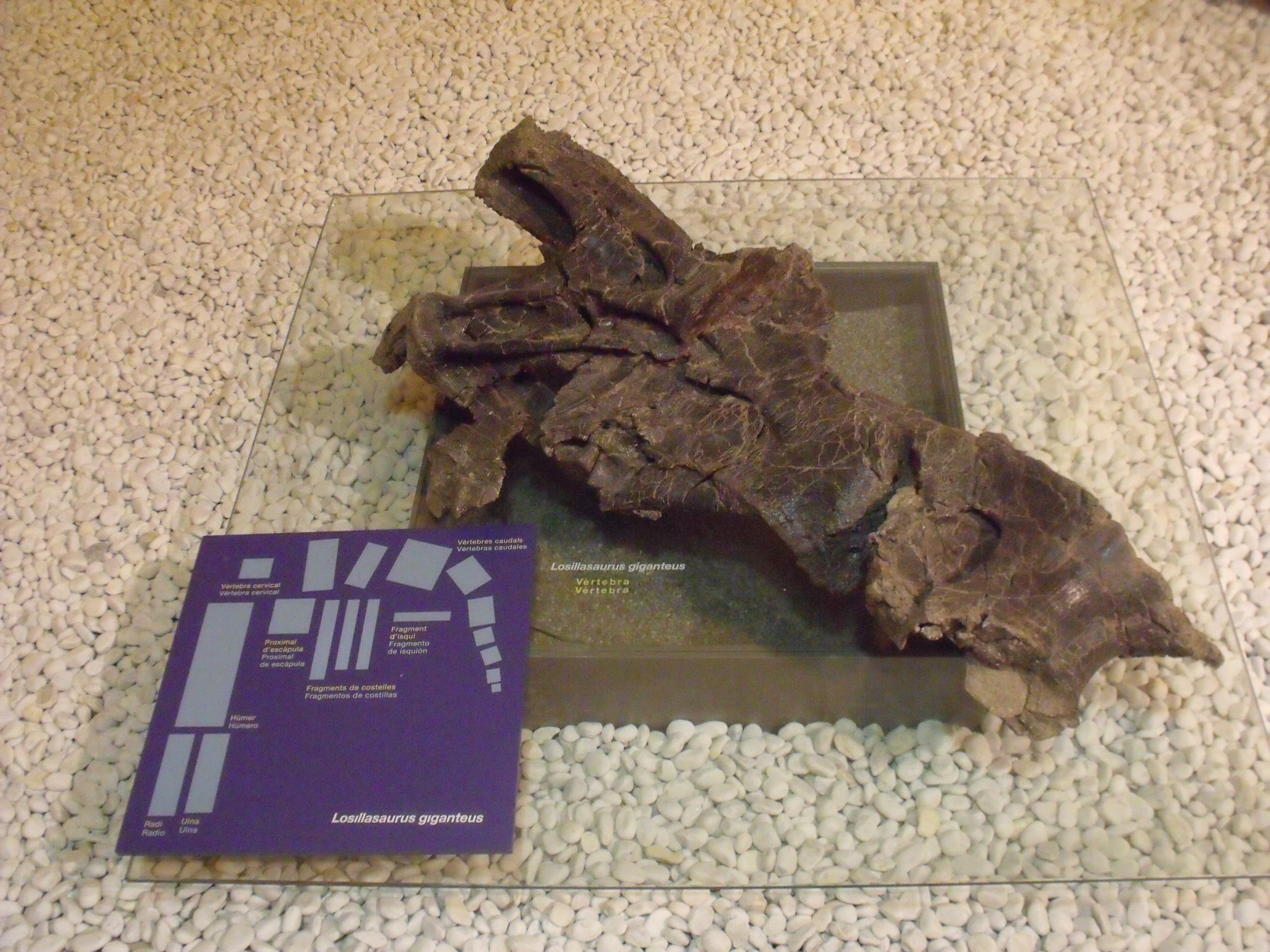
- L. giganteus vertebra

Scientific classification
- Kingdom: Animalia
- Phylum: Chordata
- Class: Reptilia
- Clade: Dinosauria
- Clade: Saurischia
- Clade: †Sauropodomorpha
- Clade: †Sauropoda
- Clade: †Turiasauria
- Genus: †Losillasaurus; Casanovas et al., 2001
- Species: †L. giganteus

Binomial name
- †Losillasaurus giganteus Casanovas et al., 2001

= Losillasaurus =

Losillasaurus Temporal range: Late Jurassic, 157.3–145 Ma

Extinct genus of dinosaurs

Losillasaurus (meaning "Losilla lizard") is a genus of turiasaurian sauropod dinosaur from the Late Jurassic and possibly Early Cretaceous (Kimmeridgian-?Berriasian) of southeastern Spain. It is also known from the Lourinhã Formation of Portugal. The type species, Losillasaurus giganteus, was discovered in the Villar del Arzobispo Formation in Valencia, and formally described by Casanovas, Santafé, and Sanz in 2001. The holotype material is from a subadult and includes part of a skull; complete cervical, dorsal, sacral, and caudal vertebrae as well as several fragments; skeletal elements from the limbs including a humerus, ulna, radius, and metacarpal; sternal plates; and from the pelvis: the ilium, ischium, and pubis. The genus is characterized by the dimension and shape of the neural spine of the proximal caudal vertebrae.

== Description ==
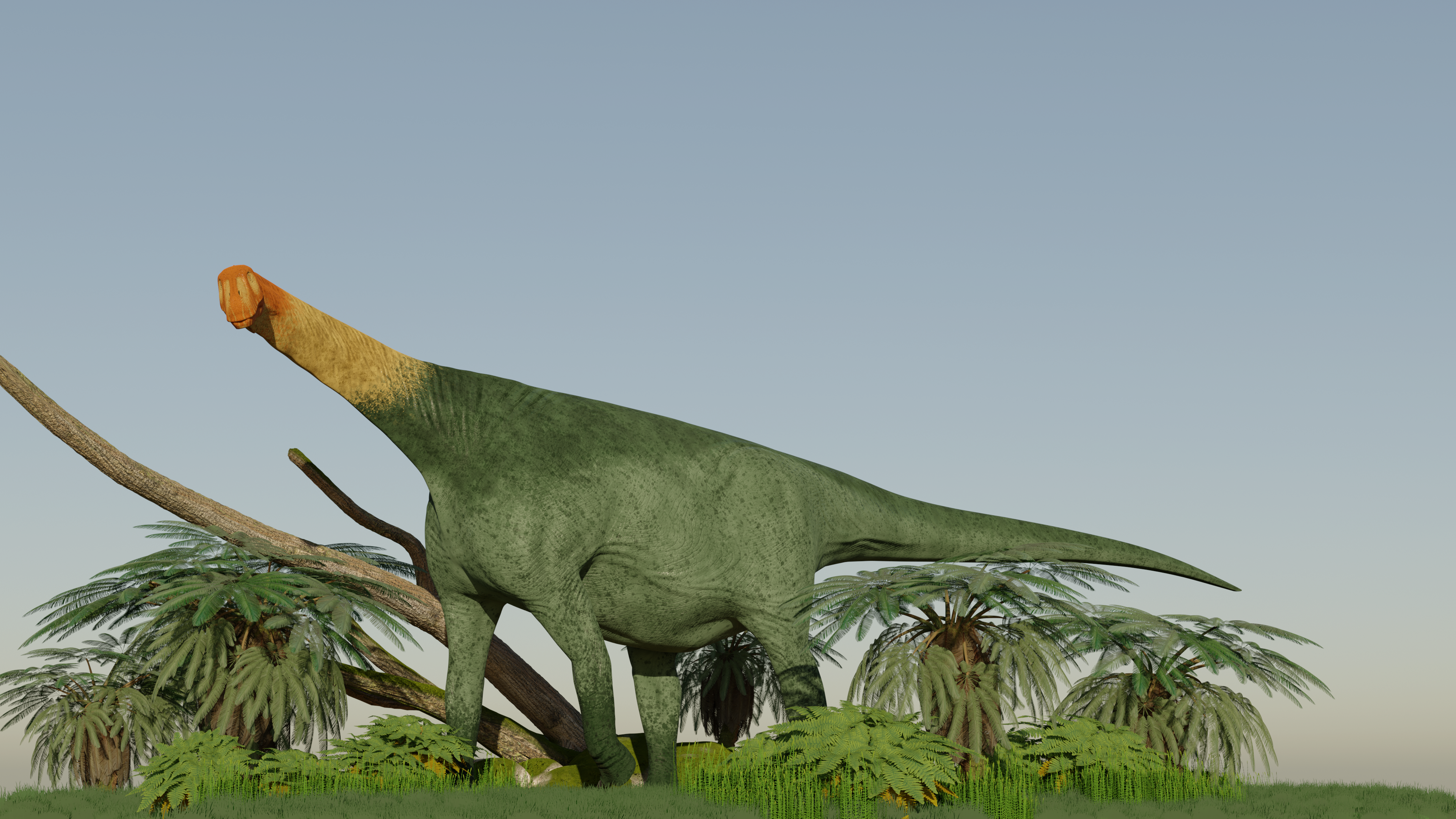
Reconstruction of Losillasaurus giganteus

Several specimens of L. giganteus were described in 2019 and 2020 - one such specimen (SHN 180) consists of a single anterior caudal vertebra, while another (the holotype) consists of a partial skull with teeth and partial postcranial skeleton. According to Rafael Royo-Torres et al., the specimen helps scientists to understand tooth variation, allows the positioning of isolated heart-shaped teeth in the skull and demonstrates heterodonty in Turiasauria. The humerus is 143 centimetres (56 in) long, which despite being from a subadult specimen is within 20% of the size of Paralititan. The size estimation proposed by Francisco Gascó in his master thesis is 15–18 m (49–59 ft) in length and 12–15 t (13–17 short tons) in body mass. However as the type specimen is not fully grown, adult Losillasaurus likely grew bigger. A giant referred specimen has a femur length of 1.92 metres (6.3 ft),a tibia length of 1.25 metres (4.1 ft) and a humerus length of 1.8 metres (5.9 ft) suggesting an animal that was similar in size to Turiasaurus. The largest Losillasaurus would have measured 25 metres (82 ft) in length and weighed about 47 tonnes (46 long tons; 52 short tons).
