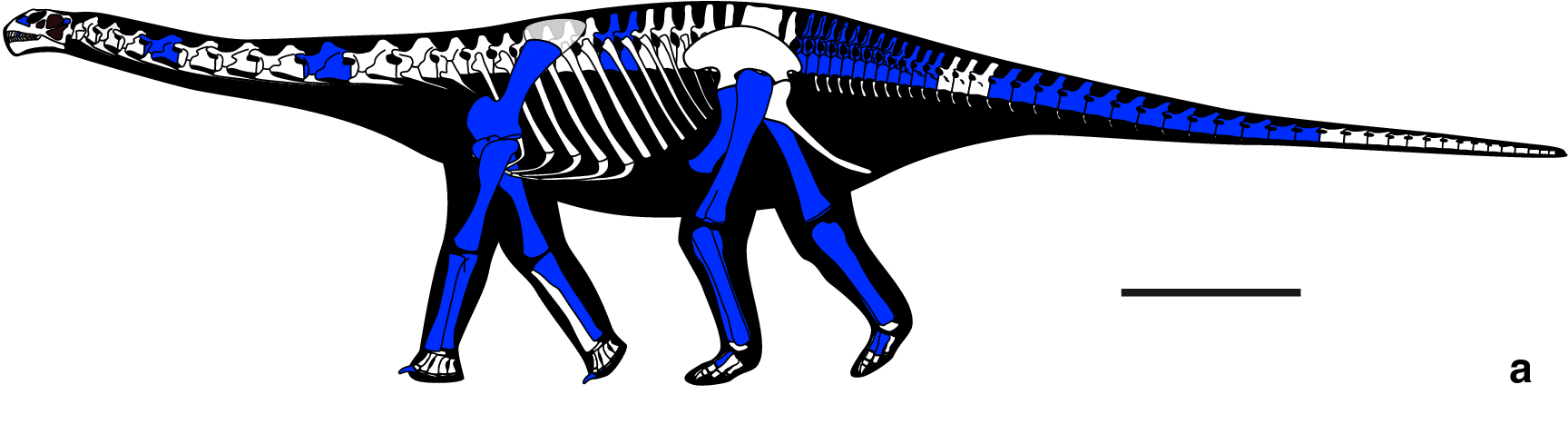
- Skeletal reconstruction, showing known bones in blue

Scientific classification
- Kingdom: Animalia
- Phylum: Chordata
- Class: Reptilia
- Clade: Dinosauria
- Clade: Saurischia
- Clade: †Sauropodomorpha
- Clade: †Sauropoda
- Clade: †Eusauropoda
- Clade: †Turiasauria
- Genus: †Amanzia; Schwarz et al., 2020

Type species
- †Amanzia greppini (von Huene, 1922)

Synonyms
- Megalosaurus meriani (in part) Greppin, 1870; Cetiosauriscus greppini (von Huene, 1922); Ornithopsis greppini von Huene, 1922

= Amanzia =

Amanzia Temporal range: Late Jurassic, ~152 Ma

Extinct genus of dinosaurs

Amanzia (after Swiss geologist Amanz Gressly) is a genus of turiasaurian sauropod dinosaur from the Late Jurassic Reuchenette Formation in Moutier, Switzerland. The type and only species is Amanzia greppini, originally named as a species of Ornithopsis and Cetiosauriscus. The Reuchenette Formation has been dated to the Kimmeridgian 152.7 to 152 million years ago.

== Discovery and naming ==
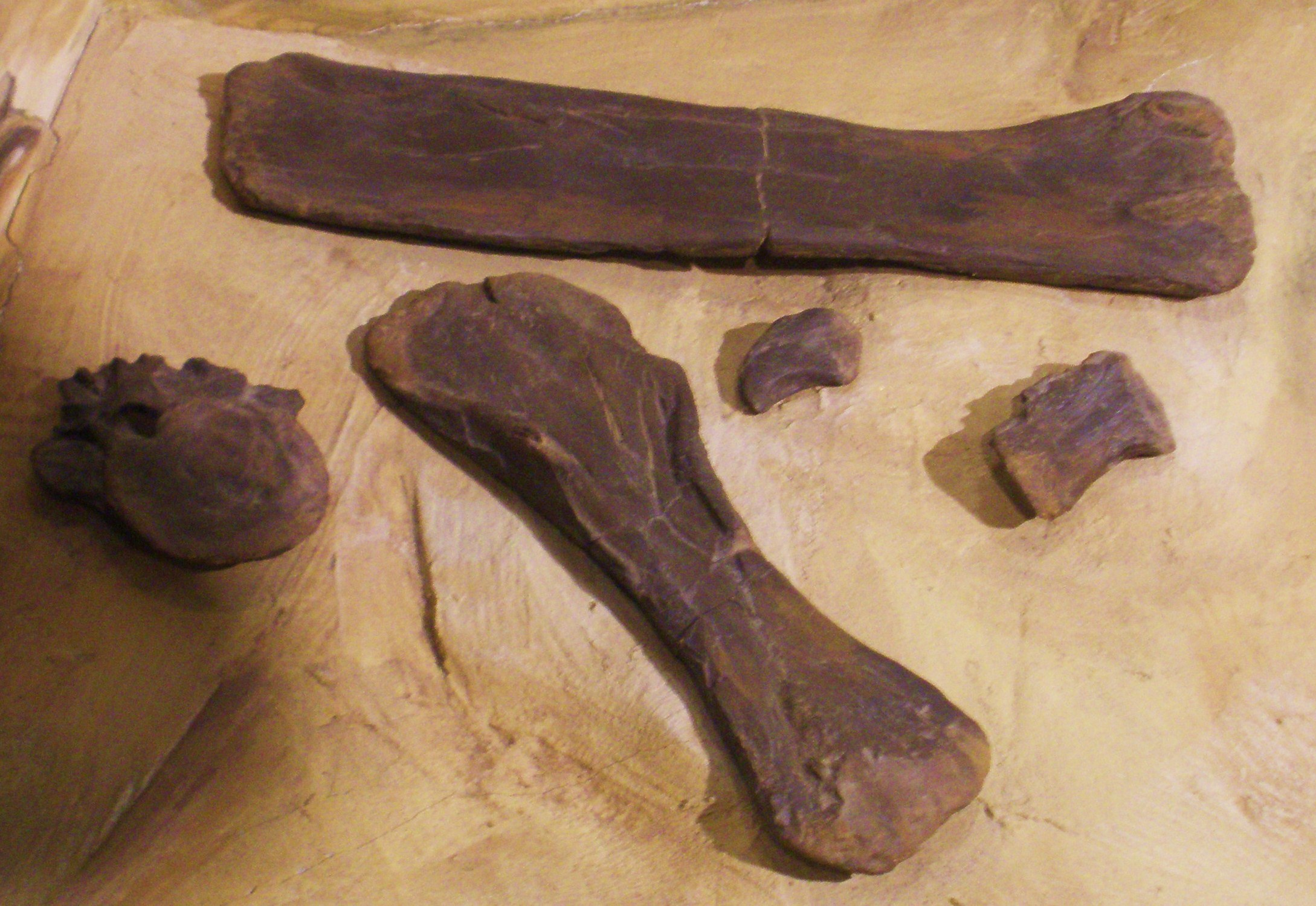
Humerus, partial femur, two vertebrae, and an ungual

The holotype remains were originally discovered in the 1860s, by workers in a limestone quarry in the Basse Montagne. Some of the remains were sold to collectors; when geologist Jean-Baptiste Greppin heard of this situation, he acquired all remaining bones and added them to the collection of the Naturhistorisches Museum Basel. Due to being found in association with the theropod tooth MH 350 found near Moutier that probably belonged to Ceratosaurus or an indeterminate member of the Ceratosauria, they were misidentified as belonging to a predatory dinosaur, for which Greppin in 1870 coined the name "Megalosaurus meriani" (named after Peter Merian). In 1920, Werner Janensch reassigned the tooth to the genus Labrosaurus. However, in 1922, Janensch realized the vertebrae belonged to a sauropod, so he wrote to Friedrich von Huene, who gave them the name Ornithopsis greppini. In 1927, von Huene assigned the species to his new genus Cetiosauriscus. From then on it has received little attention, with the few papers that mention it usually calling it a nomen dubium without further comment. The largest individual of Amanzia was 10 metres (33 ft) in length with a 73 centimetres (2.40 ft) femur.

Size comparison

After its fossils were for the first time cleaned and prepared, in 2003 by Antoine Heitz, it was realized not to be closely related to Cetiosauriscus. In 2005, a master thesis by C. Hofer was dedicated to the subject. In 2007, the rare presence of fossilised cartilage in a limb joint was reported. In 2020, Daniela Schwarz, Philip D. Mannion, Oliver Wings and Christian A. Meyer gave it the genus name Amanzia, after Swiss geologist Amanz Gressly, who was the first to discover dinosaur bones in Switzerland. Amanzia is itself the first sauropod named from Swiss remains.

In 2020, no lectotype was selected, the naming authors maintaining the original syntype series indicated by von Huene, consisting of forty-nine bones. The Reuchenette Formation in which they were found dates from the early Kimmeridgian, about 157 million years old. They include some neck vertebrae, many tail vertebrae and material from the shoulder girdle, the pelvis and limbs. Seventy-five additional sauropod specimens in the collection of the museum, from the same site as the syntypes, were in 2020 referred to the species. These also include some limited skull material and a broken tooth. The bones are not articulated, have generally been strongly compressed and had often been damaged when being forcefully removed from the rock. Von Huene had already concluded that the material represented two or three individuals; in 2020 this was increased to a minimum of four. Of these, individuals "A" and "B" have about the same size, while an individual "C" is 15% longer and an individual "D" 20% shorter. None of the specimens are clearly juvenile.
