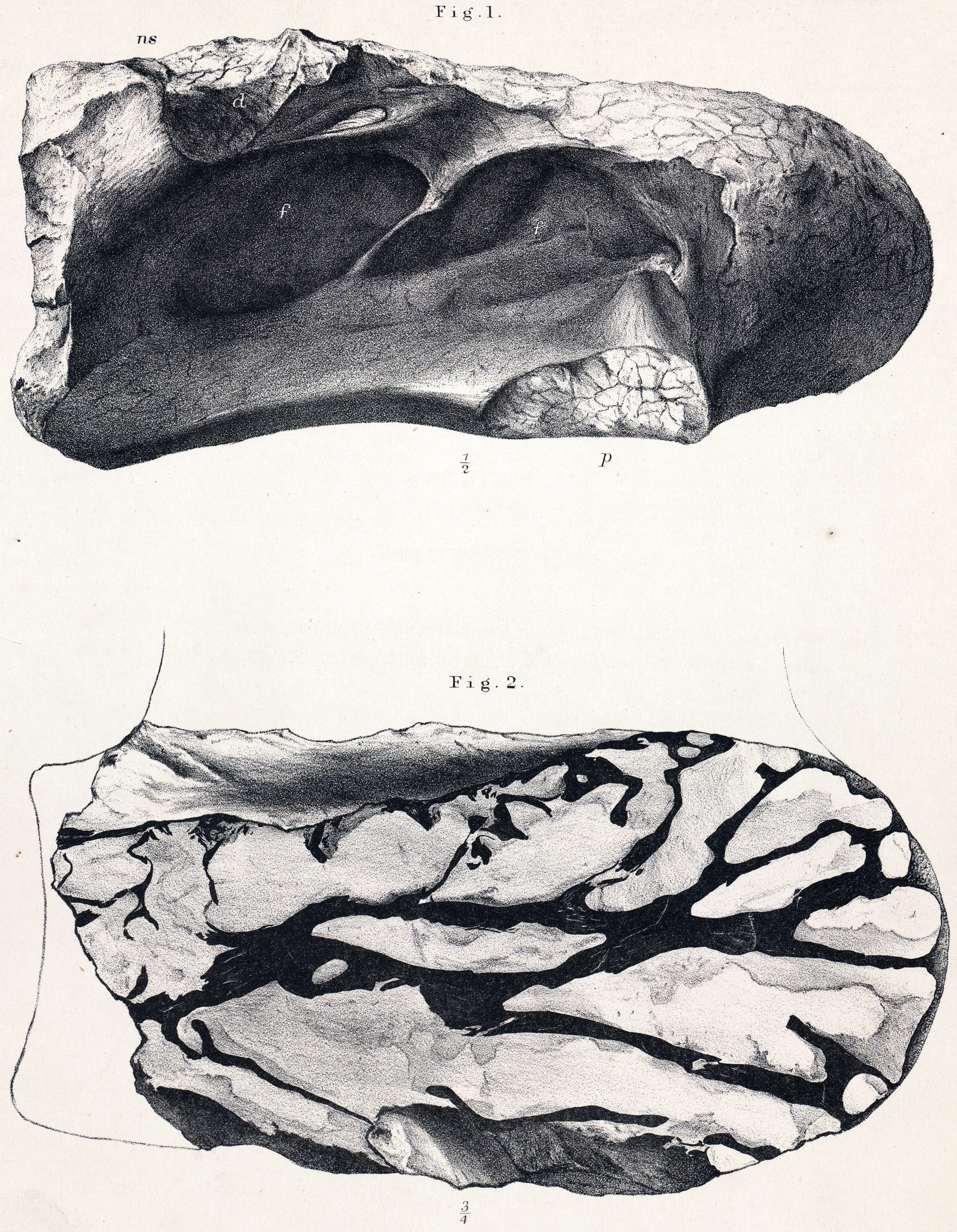
- Cervical vertebra in lateral view and cross section

Scientific classification
- Kingdom: Animalia
- Phylum: Chordata
- Class: Reptilia
- Clade: Dinosauria
- Clade: Saurischia
- Clade: †Sauropodomorpha
- Clade: †Sauropoda
- Clade: †Eusauropoda
- Genus: †Chondrosteosaurus; Owen, 1876
- Species: †C. gigas

Binomial name
- †Chondrosteosaurus gigas Owen, 1876

= Chondrosteosaurus =

Chondrosteosaurus Temporal range: Barremian, 125 Ma

Extinct species of reptile

Chondrosteosaurus (meaning "cartilage and bone lizard") is a dubious genus of sauropod dinosaur from the Early Cretaceous Wessex Formation of England. Two species have been named: C. gigas and C. magnus, both of which are now considered invalid.

== History ==
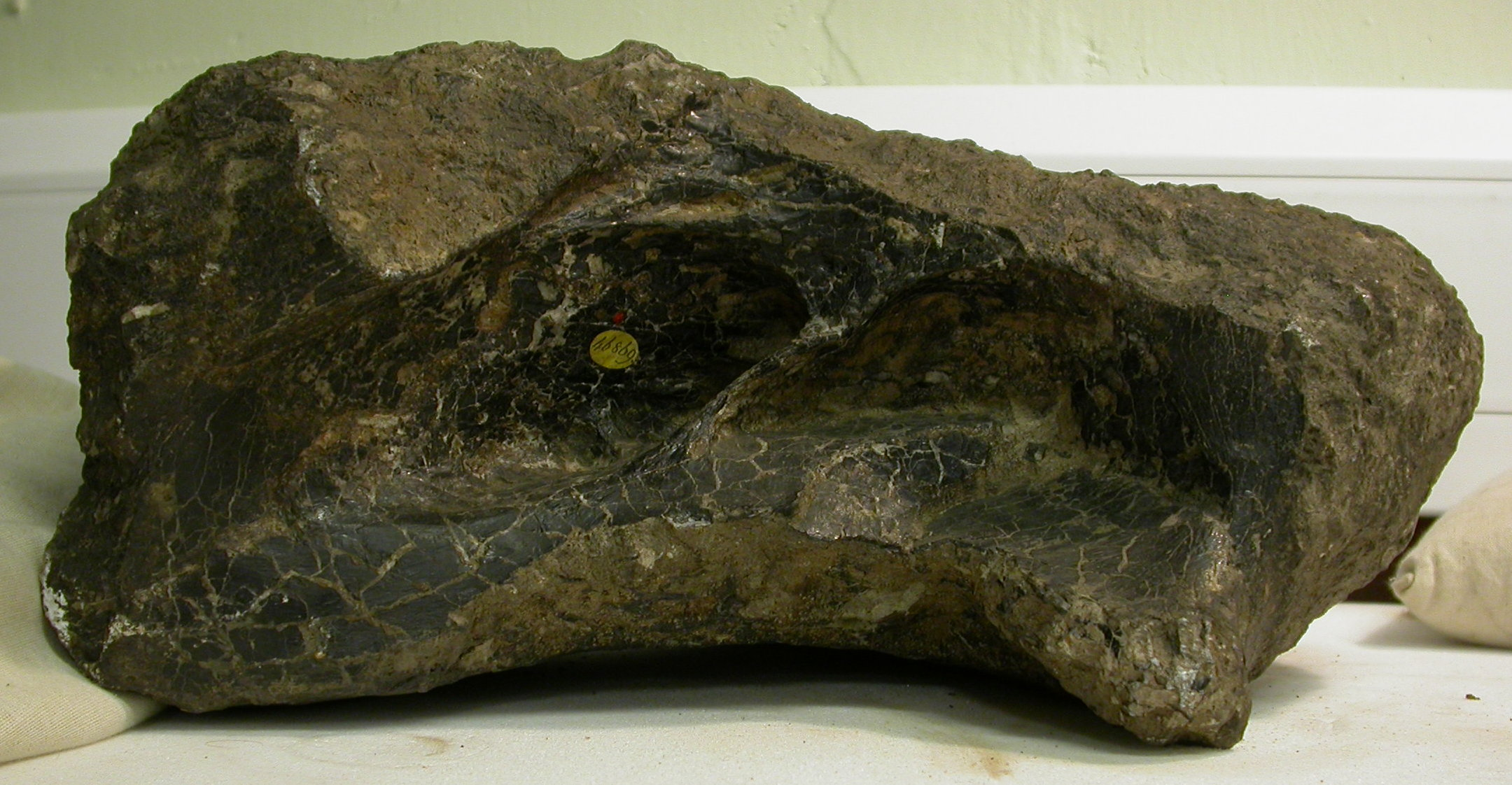
Holotype specimen of C. gigas

The type species, Chondrosteosaurus gigas, was described and named by Richard Owen in 1876. The fossils of Chondrosteosaurus were discovered in the Wessex Formation on the Isle of Wight, likely Brighstone or Brook. C. gigas is known only from two cervical (neck) vertebrae (specimens BMNH 46869, the holotype, and BMNH 46870), with distinctive hollows and internal passages now interpreted as evidence of pneumatic air sacs. Paleontologist Harry Seeley had interpreted similar structures as pneumatic in his specimen of Ornithopsis. Owen disagreed with Seeley's concept of a giant creature bridging the gap between birds or pterosaurs (Owen considered sauropods to be whale-like marine reptiles), and while he acknowledged that the external cavities on the vertebrae may have been connected to the lungs, he interpreted the internal passages as having been filled with cartilage (hence his name for the genus, Chondrosteosaurus or "cartilage and bone lizard").

Owen also named a second species, Chondrosteosaurus magnus, which was reassigned to Ornithopsis by John W. Hulke. In 1991, George Olshevsky listed it as a junior synonym of Pelorosaurus conybeari. Ten years later, Darren Naish and David Martill argued that the type vertebra of C. magnus could "belong to just about any of the named sauropod taxa from the Wealden Group".

The validity of Chondrosteosaurus has been debated. In 2001, Darren Naish and David Martill declared it a nomen dubium, as the cervical vertebrae lack any diagnostic features, though did tentatively suggest that it might have been a camarasaurid. In 2004, Paul Upchurch, Paul M. Barrett, and Peter Dodson similarly listed Chrondosteosaurus as a nomen dubium. In a 2011 book chapter discussing sauropod taxa from the Wealden Group, Paul Upchurch, Philip D. Mannion and Paul M. Barrett noted that Chrondosteosaurus lacked any diagnostic traits, and that it is best regarded as an indeterminate titanosauriform.

== See also ==
- Iguanodon
