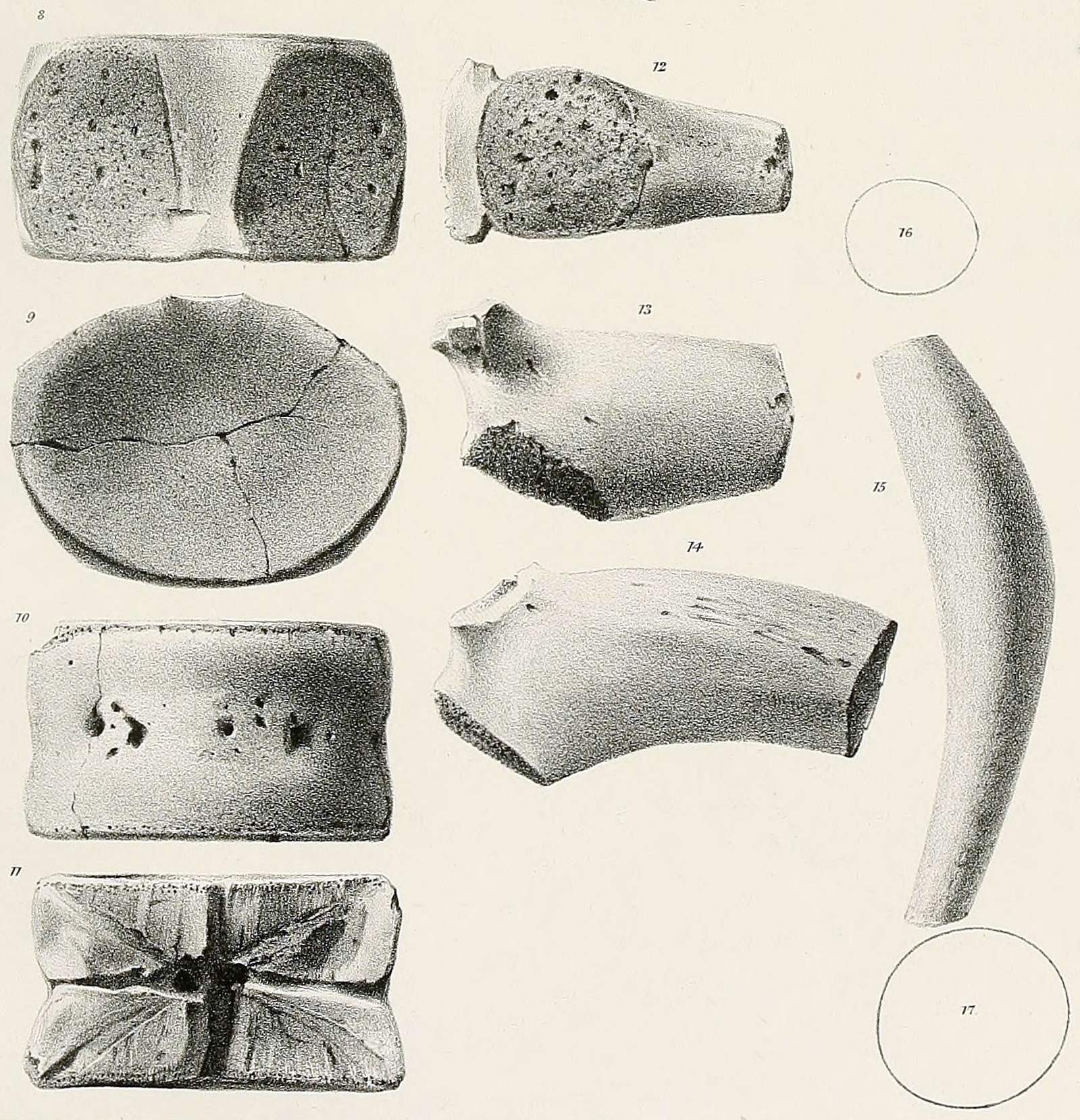
- Leidy's fossils

Scientific classification
- Kingdom: Animalia
- Phylum: Chordata
- Class: Reptilia
- Genus: †Ischyrotherium; Leidy, 1856
- Species: †I. antiquus

Binomial name
- †Ischyrotherium antiquus Leidy, 1856

Synonyms
- Ischyrotherium antiquum Leidy, 1860; Ischyrosaurus antiquum Cope, 1869

= Ischyrotherium =

Ischyrotherium Temporal range: Late Cretaceous, Maastrichtian

Extinct genus of reptiles

Ischyrotherium is an extinct genus named by Joseph Leidy in 1856 for fossils from the lignite deposits in Nebraska. Originally considered an herbivorous cetacean, Leidy then reassigned it to Sirenia as a relative of manatees, before Edward Drinker Cope reclassified it as a non-mammalian, suggesting the new name Ischyrosaurus to better identify its reptilian origins, as he considered it a sauropterygian. Ischyrotherium was found alongside material from the hadrosaur Thespesius and turtles Compsemys and Emys, and the fish Mylognathus. The name Ischyrosaurus was also used by John Whitaker Hulke for the sauropod now known as Ornithopsis manseli, as he was unaware it was preoccupied by Cope.
