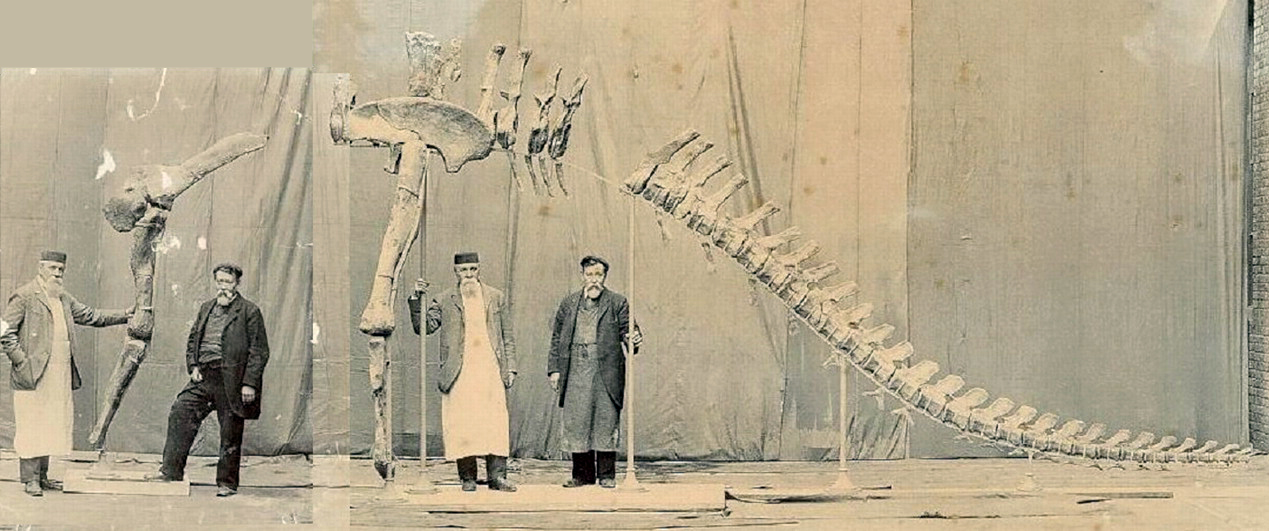
- Composite photo of the mounted holotype skeleton shortly before display in 1905

Scientific classification
- Kingdom: Animalia
- Phylum: Chordata
- Class: Reptilia
- Clade: Dinosauria
- Clade: Saurischia
- Clade: †Sauropodomorpha
- Clade: †Sauropoda
- Clade: †Gravisauria
- Clade: †Eusauropoda
- Genus: †Cetiosauriscus von Huene, 1927
- Species: †C. stewarti

Binomial name
- †Cetiosauriscus stewarti Charig, 1980

= Cetiosauriscus =

Cetiosauriscus Temporal range: Middle Jurassic, 168–163 Ma

Genus of reptiles (fossil)

Cetiosauriscus (/ˌsiːtioʊˈsɔːrɪskəs/ SEE-tee-oh-SOR-iss-kəs) is a genus of sauropod dinosaur that lived between 166 and 164 million years ago during the Callovian (Middle Jurassic Period) in what is now England. A herbivore, Cetiosauriscus had – by sauropod standards – a moderately long tail, and longer forelimbs, making them as long as its hindlimbs. It has been estimated as about 15 m (49 ft) long and between 4 and 10 t (3.9 and 9.8 long tons; 4.4 and 11.0 short tons) in weight.

The only known fossil includes most of the rear half of a skeleton as well as a forelimb (NHMUK PV R3078). Found in Cambridgeshire in the 1890s, it was described by Arthur Smith Woodward in 1905 as a new specimen of the species Cetiosaurus leedsi. This was changed in 1927, when Friedrich von Huene found NHMUK PV R3078 and the C. leedsi type specimen to be too different from Cetiosaurus, warranting its own genus, which he named Cetiosauriscus, meaning "Cetiosaurus-like". Cetiosauriscus leedsi was referred to the sauropod family Diplodocidae because of similarities in the tail and foot, and had the dubious or indeterminate species "Cetiosauriscus" greppini, "C." longus, and "C." glymptonensis assigned to it. In 1980, Alan Charig named a new species of Cetiosauriscus for NHMUK PV R3078 because of the lack of comparable material to the type of C. leedsi; this species was named Cetiosauriscus stewarti. Because of the poor state of preservation of the Cetiosauriscus leedsi fossil, Charig sent a petition to the International Commission on Zoological Nomenclature to instead make C. stewarti the type species. Cetiosauriscus stewarti became the oldest confirmed diplodocid until a phylogenetic analysis published in 2003 instead found the species to belong to Mamenchisauridae, and followed by studies in 2005 and 2015 that found it outside Neosauropoda, while not a mamenchisaurid proper.

Cetiosauriscus was found in the marine deposits of the Oxford Clay Formation alongside many different invertebrate groups, marine ichthyosaurs, plesiosaurs and crocodylians, a single pterosaur, and various dinosaurs: the ankylosaur Sarcolestes, the stegosaurs Lexovisaurus and Loricatosaurus, the ornithopod Callovosaurus, as well as some unnamed taxa. The theropods Eustreptospondylus and Metriacanthosaurus are known from the formation, although probably not from the same level as Cetiosauriscus.

== History of discovery ==
=== Background ===
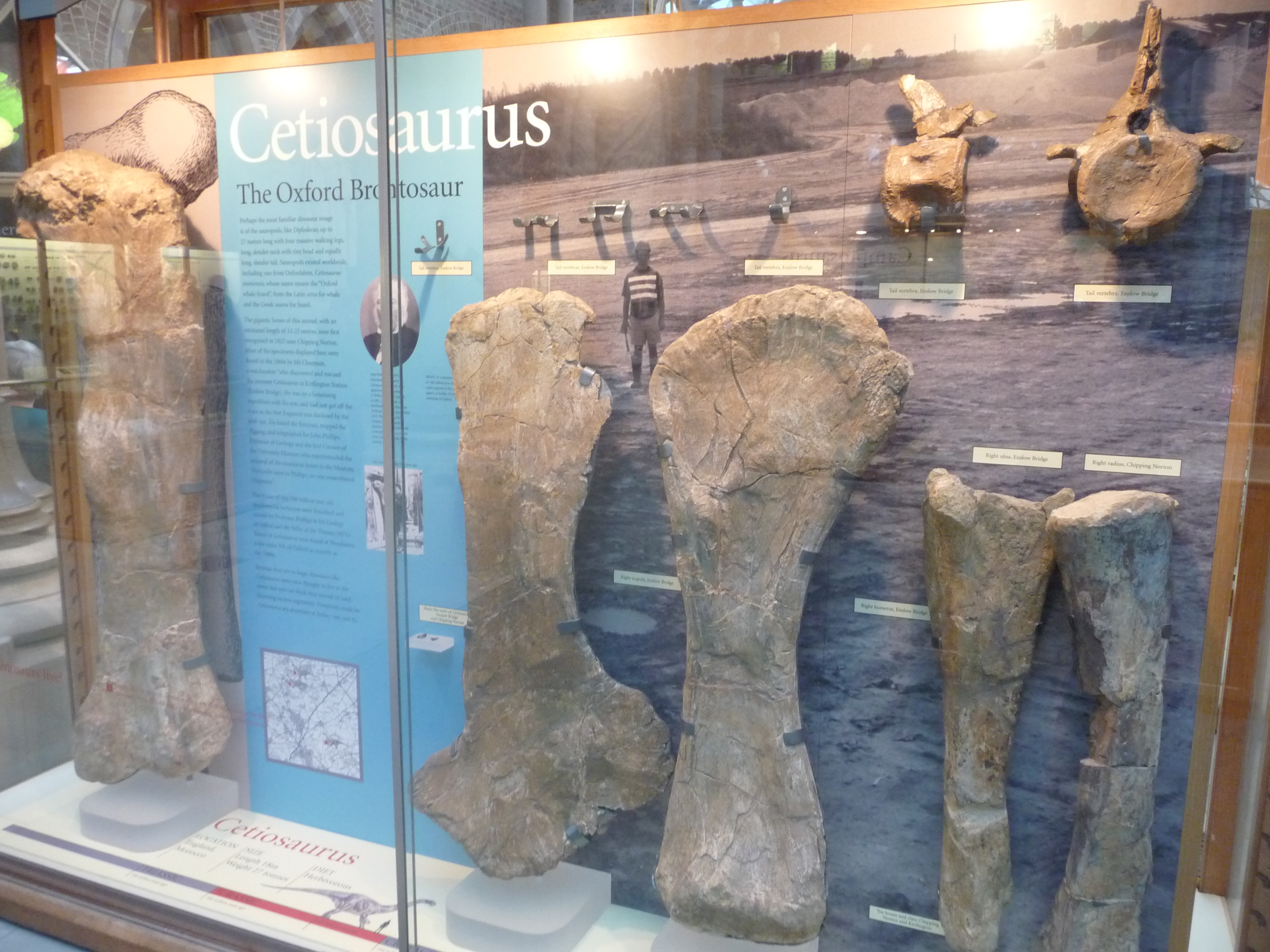
Fossil limbs and vertebrae of Cetiosaurus oxoniensis

The fossil later known as Cetiosauriscus was originally ascribed to the genus Cetiosaurus—one of the first sauropods to be named, in 1842 by palaeontologist Richard Owen, and one with a complicated history due to many unfounded referrals of species and specimens, involving almost all English sauropod specimens. The type species of Cetiosaurus has changed throughout history because of incomplete remains and the taxon's significance, and many aspects of its anatomy and relationships are still uncertain. Cetiosaurus was originally named to include C. medius, C. brevis, C. brachyurus and C. longus, which span from the Middle Jurassic to the Early Cretaceous of various localities across England. As none of these species are truly diagnostic, and Cetiosaurus is a historically and taxonomically important taxon, the more complete Middle Jurassic species C. oxoniensis named by geologist John Phillips in 1871 became the type species. C. glymptonensis was also named in the same publication by Phillips, but is less complete and of questionable validity.

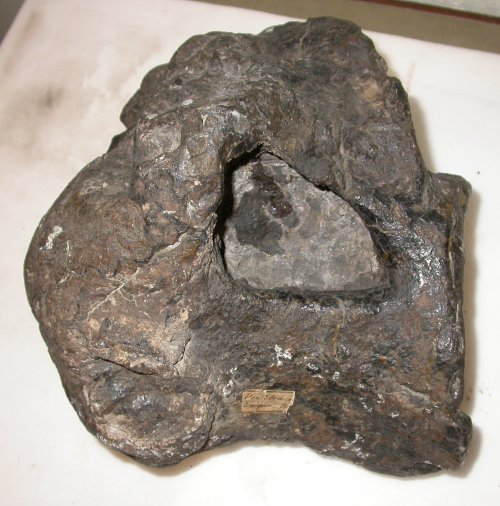
Lectotype dorsal vertebra of Ornithopsis hulkei

Another English taxon, Ornithopsis hulkei, was named in 1870 by palaeontologist Harry Govier Seeley for vertebrae from the Early Cretaceous Wessex Formation, younger than the existing species of Cetiosaurus. Seeley considered Ornithopsis to be closely related to Cetiosaurus, but different due to the internal bone structure. An additional species, Ornithopsis leedsii was named in 1887 by John Hulke for a pelvis, vertebrae and ribs collected by Alfred Nicholson Leeds, an English farmer and amateur fossil collector who throughout his life compiled numerous collections of fossils from the Oxford Clay. O. leedsii, from the Late Jurassic, showed similarities to older Cetiosaurus oxoniensis as well as younger O. hulkei. It was described in more detail by Seeley in 1889, where he considered O. hulkei, C. oxoniensis and O. leedsii to all be in the same genus, bearing the name Cetiosaurus. But naturalist Richard Lydekker discussed with Seeley, before the publication of Seeley's 1889 paper, that Cetiosaurus and Ornithopsis were not the same taxon. Lydekker suggested that Wealden fossils (including O. hulkei) belonged to Ornithopsis and the Jurassic remains (including O. leedsii and C. oxoniensis) to Cetiosaurus. Lydekker in 1895 changed his mind and referred the species O. leedsii to Pelorosaurus (known already from the species P. brevis, once named Cetiosaurus brevis)—as P. leedsi—and referred the genus to Atlantosauridae. (Note: This incorrect species spelling (removal of an "i" in the species name), would be followed by many later authors although it is simply a junior objective synonym of the original spelling.) Lydekker's classification of the species was not supported by later authors like palaeontologist Arthur Smith Woodward in 1905, who followed Seeley's classification scheme.

=== Discovery and naming ===
Location of the fossil discovery: NPBCL pit No. 1 in Cambridgeshire, England

The sauropod fossil today known as Cetiosauriscus stewarti was discovered in May 1898 by clay workers in the area around Fletton to the south of Peterborough and east of the Great Northern Railway line. Pits in this region expose the fossil-rich sedimentary rocks of the marine Oxford Clay, which is of middle Callovian age and today regarded as one of the classic geological formations of British palaeontology. The sauropod fossil possibly stems from NPBCL pit No. 1, which was the northernmost pit operated by the New Peterborough Brick Company Limited, and which produced the most vertebrate fossils. The discovery was brought to the attention of Leeds, who, after excavation, took the sauropod specimen to Eyebury, the Leeds' family home. In mid-August, after some cleaning and repairing of the specimen, geologist Henry Woodward visited Eyebury and produced a life-sized drawing of the remains for presentation at the British Association for the Advancement of Science Meeting. Following this presentation, on 17 August 1898, Henry Woodward returned with American palaeontologist Othniel Charles Marsh, who considered the sauropod to be closely related to the North American taxon Diplodocus. Alfred Leeds offered the sauropod to the British Museum of Natural History (BMNH, now abbreviated as NHMUK) for £250, which would equate to about £30,529 in 2017. The NHMUK had earlier in 1890 and 1892 bought the First and Second Collections of Alfred Leeds, respectively. Woodward, Keeper of Geology at the NHMUK, had "great pleasure" to recommend to the Trustees of the NHMUK the fossil be purchased. The purchase was sanctioned on 25 February 1899, along with the purchase of assorted other remains for just over £357 (~£43,596 in 2018), where the Leeds sauropod gained the accession number BMNH R3078 (now NHMUK PV R3078).

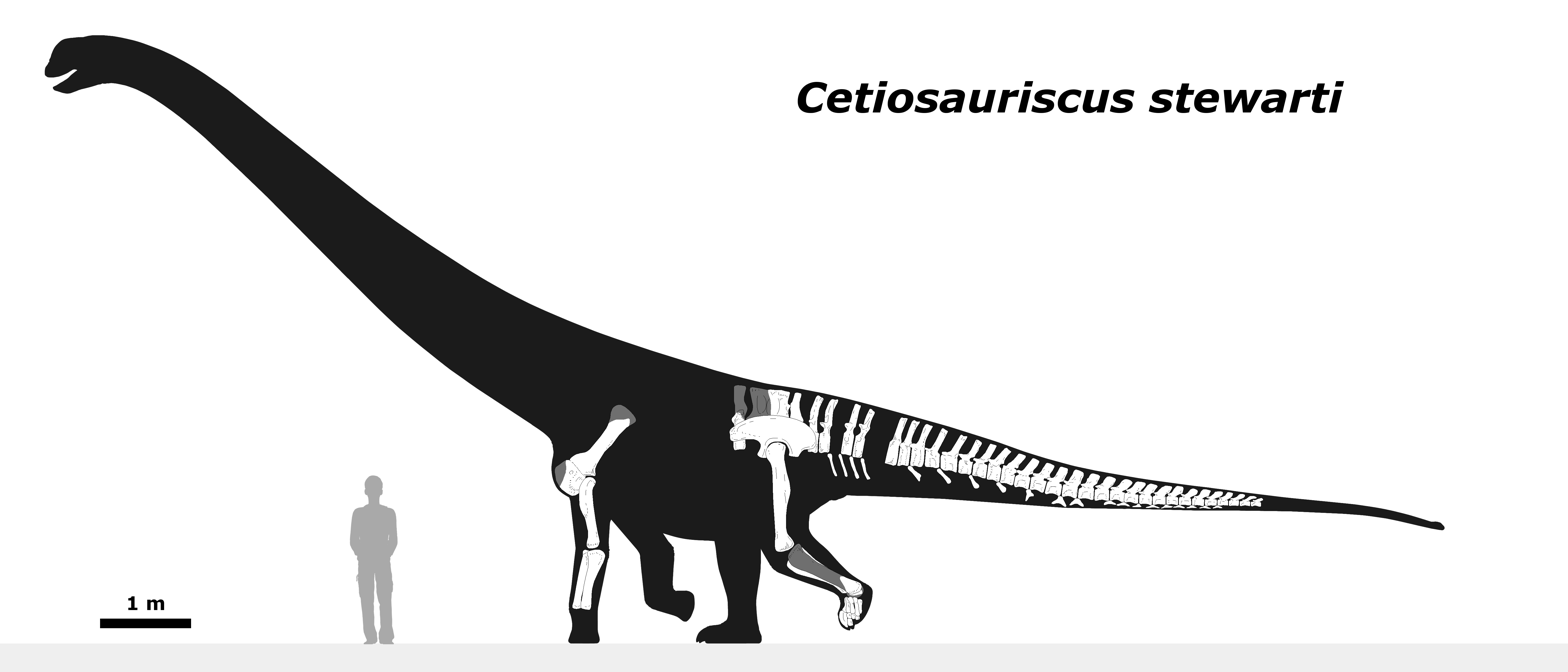
Known elements of Cetiosauriscus

The amount of material made NHMUK PV R3078 the most complete sauropod specimen from the United Kingdom, comparable only later to the "Rutland Dinosaur" (referred to Cetiosaurus) discovered in 1967. Known regions of the specimen include the forelimb, hindlimb and vertebral column. The forelimb lacks the manus (hand) and part of the radius and ulna, although the hindlimb lacks only a few bones in the pes (foot) and fragments of the tibia, fibula and ilium. The vertebrae known are four parts of dorsal vertebrae, the neural spines of the sacrum, multiple anterior caudal vertebrae (tail bones), and a series of 27 nearly complete vertebrae from the middle of the tail with associated or articulated chevrons (ribs along the underside of the tail), although the vertebral series is not continuous. A tail tip (NHMUK PV R1967) from the same locality, but a different individual was thought by palaeontologist Alan Charig in 1980 to belong to Cetiosauriscus. The assignment of NHMUK PV R1967 to Cetiosauriscus was considered unlikely in alternate studies by palaeontologists Friedrich von Huene, Paul Upchurch and Darren Naish because of the lack of overlap and uncertain phylogenetic positions. In 1903, the skeleton was mounted as preserved in the British Museum, so it could be more easily compared with other mounted sauropods from North America. The mount of Cetiosauriscus was put on display just prior to the cast skeleton of Diplodocus, and was displayed with the dorsal vertebrae NHMUK PV R1984 and some isolated teeth from a camarasaurid (possibly referable to Cetiosauriscus), making it the first sauropod skeleton mounted in the United Kingdom.

NHMUK PV R3078 was referred in 1905 by Arthur Woodward to the species Cetiosaurus leedsii, as it was from the same geologic formation as other specimens that were assigned to C. leedsii. Woodward also referred the dorsal vertebrae NHMUK PV R1984 and the tail tip NHMUK PV R1967 to the species. In 1927, Huene briefly described the anatomy of the species C. leedsii, where he noted that it shared many similarities with Haplocanthosaurus and was most likely between Cetiosaurus proper and the former genus. For this reason, Huene proposed the new genus name Cetiosauriscus for the species. To the genus he referred the specimens NHMUK PV R1984–R1988 and NHMUK PV R3078.

=== Misassigned species ===
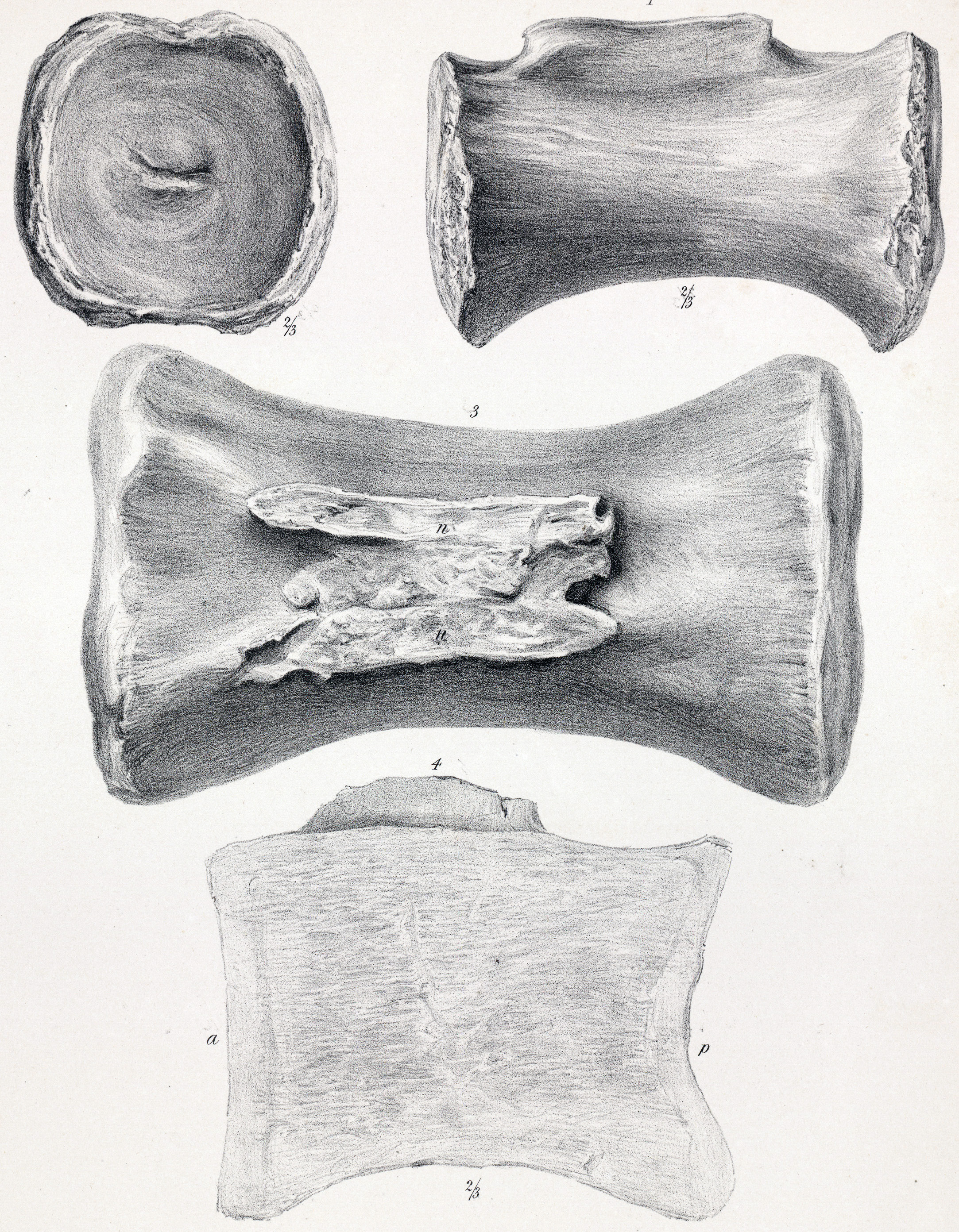
Caudal vertebra of "Cetiosauriscus" longus (now Eusauropoda indet.) seen from in front, above, the side, and cross section

Huene (1927) assigned "Ornithopsis" greppini, which he had named in 1922, to the genus Cetiosauriscus. The known material, discovered in Late Jurassic (Kimmeridgian) deposits in the Reuchenette Formation of Switzerland, includes dorsal and caudal vertebrae, forelimb bones, and a hindlimb and partial pes, from at least two individuals. The 53 cm (21 in) long humerus was built like Cetiosauriscus stewarti (C. leedsi of von Huene's 1927 usage), and the two species were originally distinguished from Cetiosaurus by having shorter dorsal vertebrae, a shorter forelimb, and a longer lower leg. Similarities such as the anatomy of the caudal vertebrae were suggested by Christian Meyer and Basil Thüring in 2003 to support the referral of greppini to Cetiosauriscus. However, Weishampel et al. (2004) and Whitlock (2011) considered "Cetiosauriscus" greppini to be Eusauropoda incertae sedis, while Hofer (2005) and Schwarz et al. (2007) concluded that "Cetiosauriscus" greppini represents an unnamed genus of basal eusauropod. "Ornithopsis" greppini was finally named as the new genus Amanzia in 2020.

The species Cetiosaurus longus, named in 1842 by Owen, was referred to the genus Cetiosauriscus without comment by sauropod palaeontologist John Stanton McIntosh in 1990. The species was named for a dorsal and caudal vertebrae from the Portland stone of Garsington, Oxfordshire (both now missing) and two other caudal vertebrae from the same deposit of nearby Thame. Owen also referred a single vertebra and some metatarsals originally named Cetiosaurus epioolithicus (an invalid nomen nudum) to the species. One of the vertebrae (OUMNH J13871) may instead be a cervical, as it has one mildly convex and one concave articular face. Characterised as having uniquely elongate vertebral centra (body of the vertebra), C. longus is not a diagnostic taxon. As it lacks any diagnostic features of Cetiosauriscus, the species should be referred to by its original designation, Cetiosaurus longus.

Cetiosaurus glymptonensis, named on the basis of nine middle-distal caudal centra from the Forest Marble Formation of Oxfordshire, England, was referred to Cetiosauriscus by McIntosh in 1990. These caudal vertebrae were considered to be more elongate than those of Cetiosaurus oxoniensis, but caudal length proportions vary significantly throughout the tail and in different taxa, Apatosaurus, Diplodocus and Cetiosauriscus having similarly elongate caudal vertebrae. The more anterior caudals have a large ridge two-thirds up the centrum and a smaller ridge one-third up. These ridges are similar to the middle caudals of Cetiosauriscus. Still, they are absent in caudals of the same size and proportions, and because of this difference the species was concluded to be separate from Cetiosauriscus by Upchurch and Martin in 2003. "Cetiosaurus" glymptonensis is considered to be Eusauropoda incertae sedis by Upchurch and Martin (2003), Weishampel and colleagues (2004) and Whitlock (2011), and is in need of a new genus name because it has a single diagnostic feature, the lateral ridges.

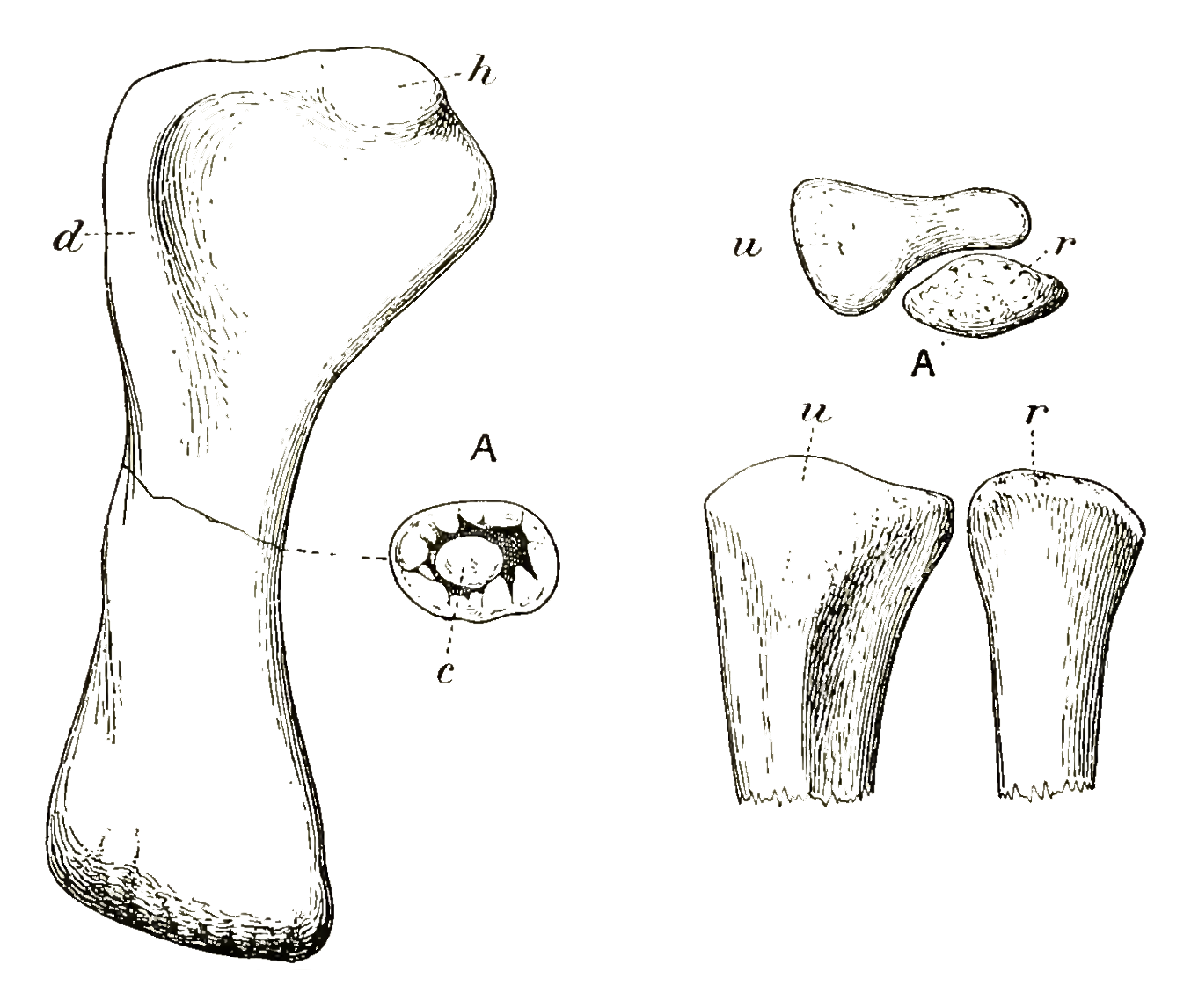
Forelimb of Cetiosauriscus in front and top views

In 1980, Charig described a specimen of indeterminate diplodocid from the Early Cretaceous of England, and re-examined the holotype of Cetiosauriscus leedsii to compare its characteristics. In this publication he confirmed that the ilium of the holotype of C. leedsii, NHMUK PV R1988, was too incomplete to be compared to the also incomplete ilium of the referred specimen NHMUK PV R3078. Because of the lack of overlap the referral of NHMUK PV R3078 to Cetiosauriscus leedsii was no longer verifiable, so Charig named the new species Cetiosauriscus stewarti for NHMUK PV R3078. The specific name was chosen to honour Sir Ronald Stewart, the chairman of the London Brick Company that owned the clay pit the fossils had been found in. Furthermore, Charig considered Cetiosauriscus leedsii and Cetiosauriscus greppini to be dubious taxa, making C. stewarti the only valid species within Cetiosauriscus. Because of the invalidity of the type species C. leedsii, Charig made a petition to the International Code of Zoological Nomenclature (ICZN) in 1993 to designate Cetiosauriscus stewarti as the type species of its genus, being the taxon containing the specimen Huene had originally named the genus for and distinguished from Cetiosaurus, and also a taxonomically more stable name. This was accepted by the ICZN in 1995, making Cetiosauriscus stewarti the type species of Cetiosauriscus. The only specimen that can confidently be assigned to C. stewarti is the holotype NHMUK PV R3078, although it is possible that isolated teeth from the Oxford Clay could be from the taxon.

== Description ==
A diagram showing the possible size of Cetiosauriscus compared to humans

Cetiosauriscus was a moderately sized, quadrupedal eusauropod. It had a moderately long tail, and relatively long arms making the shoulders level with the hips. Cetiosauriscus was approximately 15 m (49 ft) long based on the known skeleton, comparable to possible relatives like 16 m (52 ft) long Cetiosaurus, and 16.5 m (54 ft) long Patagosaurus. The weight of Cetiosauriscus is less certain, depending on its phylogenetic placement. Restored as a diplodocid, Cetiosauriscus was estimated by Paul (2010) as 4 t (3.9 long tons; 4.4 short tons), but restored as a cetiosaur it was estimated by Paul (2016) as 10 t (9.8 long tons; 11 short tons).

=== Vertebrae ===
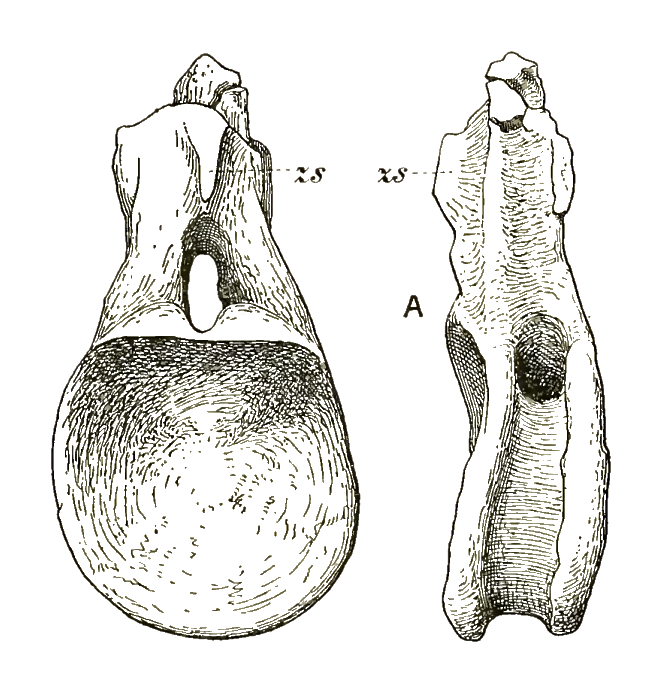
Posterior dorsal vertebra in rear and side views

The dorsal vertebrae of NHMUK PV R3078 are incomplete or fragmentary. A partial anterior dorsal is known from a single centrum, which is about as long as wide, with a strong anterior articular ball (an opisthocoelous condition). On the lateral surfaces (sides) of the centrum there are deep but small pleurocoels (depressions in the sides of vertebrae for air sacs). A single middle dorsal centrum is preserved, slightly smaller than the anterior dorsal. The pleurocoel is more elongate, but like the anterior dorsal there is no ventral (underside) concavity. A posterior dorsal is also known and is probably the last dorsal before the sacrum (vertebrae between the pelves). It preserves the entire centrum and most of the neural arch, and is significantly shortened in length compared to the other dorsals, although it is about as wide across as tall. A shallow pleurocoel is also present, but is placed higher on the side of the centrum and disappears into the neural arch. Unlike the anterior dorsal, the posterior dorsal is only very slightly opisthocoelous. A tall and narrow hyposphene (thin vertical ridge below the anterior processes of the arch, providing additional vertebral articulation) is present and well expanded off the arch. A single dorsal neural spine is also preserved. It is flattened and not tall, with a narrowed tip, and the only noticeable laminae present are the spinopostzygapophyseal laminae running down the rear corners of the spine to the postzygapophyses. This is unlike most diplodocoids where there are many laminar running along the length of the spines. Four neural spines of the sacrum are preserved, three of which form a single plate and the fourth of which is separate, like in Diplodocus.

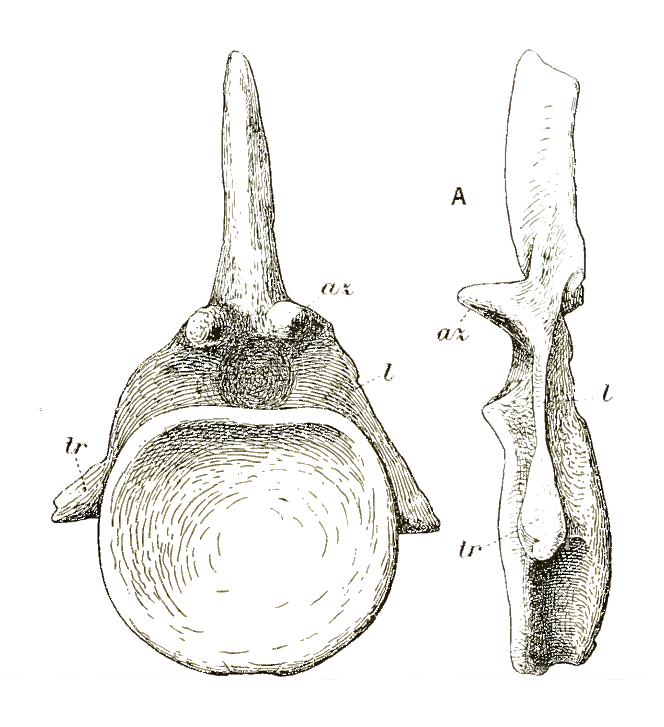
Fourth caudal vertebra in front and side views

Of the anterior four caudal vertebrae, the anteriormost two are highly incomplete. Both the short, but wider-than-tall, centra preserve traces of the sideways projections (transverse processes) found in other vertebrae, which are very low on the sides compared to following caudals. The neural spines are very thin, thinning to a single ridge in front (the prespinal lamina), but having two spinopostzygapophyseal laminae like the dorsals. The fourth caudal is the most complete anterior caudal. The centrum is concave in front, but flat behind (amphiplatyan). There are no pleurocoels unlike the dorsals, and the transverse processes begin in the top half of the centrum. The centrum is 10 cm (3.9 in) long, 27 cm (11 in) tall and 28 cm (11 in) wide, with the total vertebra being 66 cm (26 in) tall. Anterior caudals of the Cetiosaurus leedsi specimen NHMUK PV R1984 are very similar to those of Cetiosauriscus, but the neural arches are not as tall in C. leedsi, and the transverse processes lack a prominent ridge along the top of them. Middle and posterior caudals from a nearly continuous series of 27 bones are well preserved in Cetiosauriscus. The later vertebrae are slightly more elongate than those in front, and slightly less concave in their anterior face. Moving towards the end of the tail the centra reduce in size and the transverse processes shrink until they are completely absent, with the neural spines becoming shorter, thinner, and more slanted. The seventh vertebrae of the series, at 45 cm (18 in) tall, is 18 cm (7.1 in) long, only one cm longer than the 21st of the same series that is 22.5 cm (8.9 in) tall. A distinguishing characteristic of Cetiosauriscus is the presence of a front-to-back concavity on the top of the anterior and middle caudal neural spines.

=== Appendicular skeleton ===
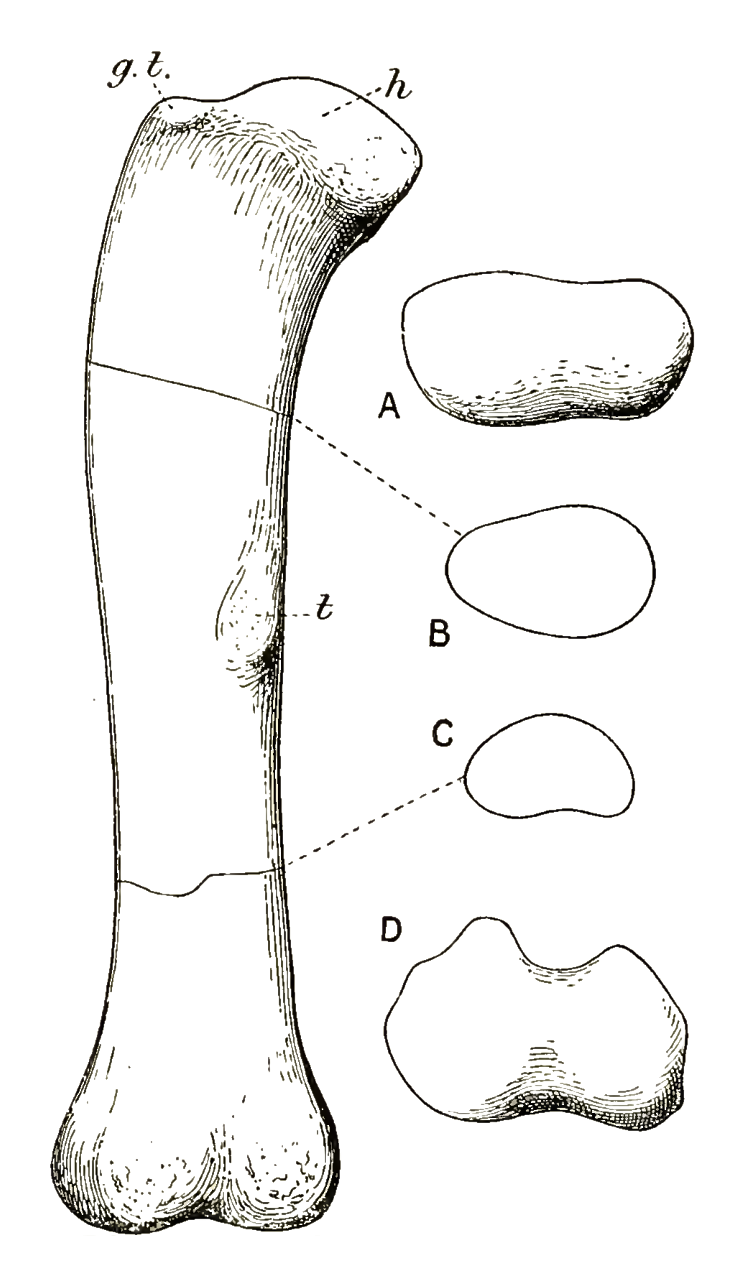
Femur of Cetiosauriscus in rear, top, and bottom views and cross sections

Cetiosauriscus preserves a single right scapula (shoulder blade), which is elongate and slender. The scapula is 96.5 cm (38.0 in) long and 17.5 cm (6.9 in) wide at the middle, making it very narrow. The inner face is flat across, while the outer face is gently convex. There is no expansion of the far end of the blade. The bone thickens close to the humerus joint, where it also articulates with the coracoid. The coracoid is incomplete, but enough is preserved to show it is rectangular, and longer, at 35 cm (14 in), than it is wide—38 cm (15 in). A 94 cm (37 in) long humerus is known, and complete with minimal crushing. The bone is short and stout, with a robust crest for the deltoid muscle along the upper half of the bone. The shape of the humerus is similar to the shortness of Neuquensaurus, although overall the forelimb is long, as in Diplodocus and Cetiosaurus, being 69% of the femur length. The distal end is roughened for a large cartilage cap as found in some other eusauropods like "Cetiosauriscus" greppini. The radius and ulna are broken, but complete they would have been 76 cm (30 in) long.

The hindlimb of Cetiosauriscus is about 3/2 the length of the forelimb. Both ilia are very fragmentary, but the two sides supplement each other to give a reasonable idea of the proportions of the complete bone. The ilium is 1.02 m (3.3 ft) long, and has a long and slender pubic peduncle. It is proportionally lower than in Cetiosaurus, being similar in proportions to Haplocanthosaurus and the later "Titanosauridae". The left femur is complete, but part of the shaft is eroded away. It is very slender, being 1.36 m (4.5 ft) tall but only 19.5 cm (7.7 in) wide at the middle. This very gracile femoral morphology is shared with Amphicoelias, Shunosaurus, Ligabuesaurus and a specimen of Diplodocus, being more gracile than Cetiosaurus and most other eusauropods. A prominent fourth trochanter is present, but the remaining shaft is very compressed. The tibia, fibula and pes are also preserved, but are fragmentary and disarticulated making comparisons difficult, the lower hindlimb being about 80 cm (31 in) upright. The foot is similar to Diplodocus and Brontosaurus, where the first toes are large and clawed, and the outer ones are small and clawless. Metatarsal III is the longest, followed by metatarsal IV, II, V and I. Metatarsal I is the widest, and the width of the bones decreases numerically.

== Classification ==
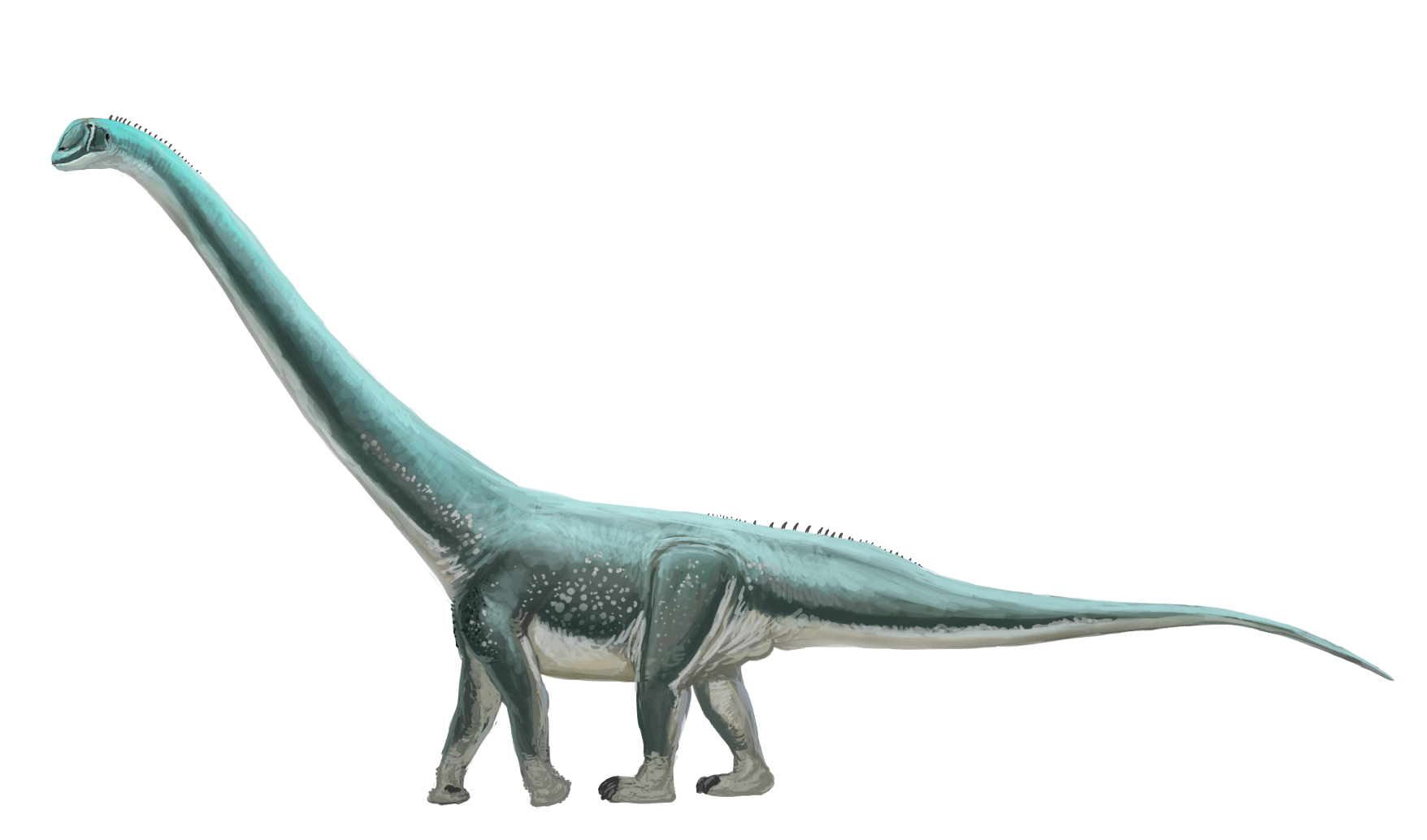
Speculative life restoration

Cetiosauriscus was originally classified by Huene as a genus in the family Cetiosauridae, within the subfamily Cardiodontidae. The subfamily, including the other taxa Cetiosaurus, Haplocanthosaurus, Dystrophaeus, Elosaurus and Rhoetosaurus, was founded upon the general basal features of elongate cervicals and shortened dorsals—both opisthocoelous, amphicoelous caudals that are rod-shaped distally, paired sternal plates, an ilium lacking the postacetabular process (region of the ilium behind the ischium joint and acetabulum), a very wide pubis, wide distal ischium, significantly shorter forelimb than hindlimb, fibula lacking the middle muscle attachment, and long metacarpals and short metatarsals. This classification was amended in 1932 when Huene concluded Cetiosauriscus was closer to Haplocanthosaurus than Cetiosaurus in the family, because of forelimb and hindlimb proportions. Conversely, in 1956, Alfred Romer synonymised Cetiosauriscus and Cetiosaurus, a position that has not been followed by subsequent studies on the taxon.

David S. Berman and McIntosh in 1978 referred Cetiosauriscus to the family Diplodocidae along with multiple other genera; Diplodocus, Apatosaurus, Barosaurus, Mamenchisaurus Dicraeosaurus and Nemegtosaurus. Like other members of the family, Cetiosauriscus possesses wing-like transverse processes, divided chevrons with forward and backward projections, the tail is "whiplash"-like, the humerus is 2/3 the length of the femur, the calcaneum is absent, metatarsal III and IV are the longest, and metatarsal I has a process on the bottom back corner. This referral would make Cetiosauriscus, known from the Callovian, the oldest diplodocid, millions of years older than Diplodocus, Barosaurus or Apatosaurus. In the paper naming Cetiosauriscus stewarti, Charig also described the chevrons of a new specimen and created the term "diplodociform" to describe them. This meant they were robust and double-beamed, as in Diplodocus and its relatives like Mamenchisaurus. Because of the similarly "diplodociform" chevrons, Charig referred Cetiosauriscus to the Diplodocidae along with the new specimen. Elaborating upon his earlier paper, McIntosh (1990) weakly referred Cetiosauriscus to the subfamily Diplodocinae, characterised by more cervicals and fewer dorsals, tall sacrum neural spines, short forelimbs, no calcaneum, metatarsals III and IV being the longest, and a small process on the distal end of metatarsal I. The subfamily also included Diplodocus, Barosaurus and Apatosaurus. In 2004 this placement was followed by Weishampel et al. without comment.

A phylogenetic analysis of Cetiosauriscus was conducted in 2003 by Julia Heathcote and Upchurch, based upon the two most inclusive matrices of the time, those of Jeffrey A. Wilson (2002) and Upchurch (1995), neither of which had included the taxon in the past. Added to the analysis of Upchurch, Cetiosauriscus placed as the sister taxon of Tehuelchesaurus, in a group including Mamenchisaurus, Omeisaurus and Euhelopus, and a placement within a group of Omeisaurus and Mamenchisaurus was also found by using the Wilson matrix. Based on these two results, Heathcote and Upchurch concluded Cetiosauriscus was not a diplodocid or even within Diplodocoidea, instead being a more basal sauropod outside Neosauropoda. The phylogenetic analysis of Rauhut et al. (2005) resolved Cetiosauriscus in a clade with Omeisaurus, itself in a group with Losillasaurus and Mamenchisaurus, outside of Neosauropoda. The phylogenetic relationships of Cetiosauriscus were also tested in 2015 by Tschopp et al., as a potential diplodocid. Although the genus was found to be within Diplodocimorpha with one analysis method, it was also found outside Neosauropoda. In both, Cetiosauriscus stewarti was found to be in a clade alone with Barosaurus affinis, a dubious species known only from foot bones. Tschopp et al. concluded that Cetiosauriscus was not a diplodocid or a diplodocoid, as forcing it to be outside Neosauropoda was more parsimonious than forcing it to be within Diplodocoidea in all analyses. As the paper was only to test relationships within Diplodocidae, more solid conclusions regarding the position of Cetiosauriscus could not be made. The results of the favoured cladogram of Tschopp et al. is shown below:

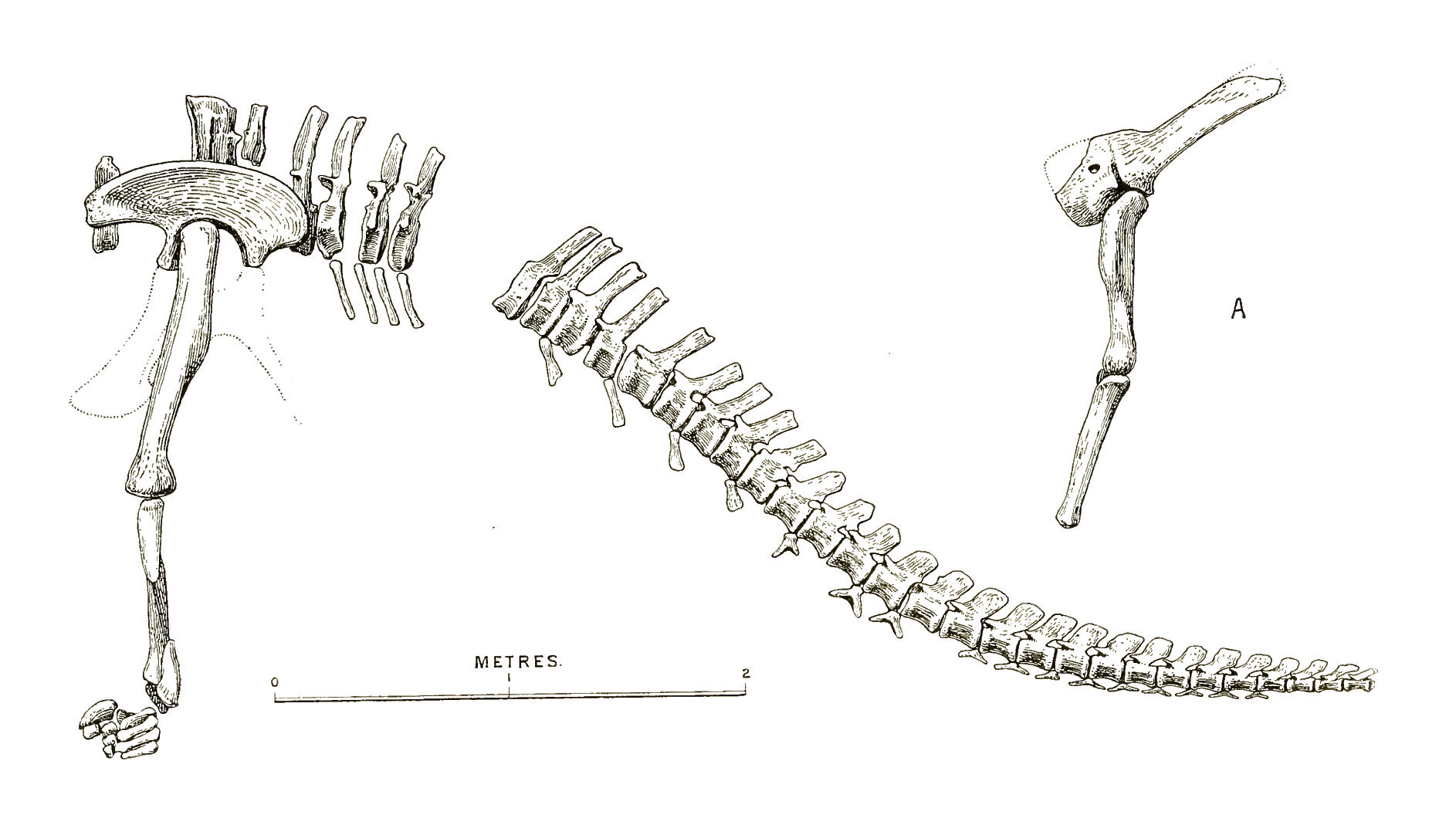
1905 drawing of the mounted skeleton of Cetiosauriscus

- Eusauropoda
  - Shunosaurus lii
  - - Spinophorosaurus nigerensis
    - - Omeisaurus
      - - Mamenchisaurus
        - - - Cetiosauriscus stewarti
            - Barosaurus affinis
          - - Jobaria tiguidensis
            - - - Amphicoelias latus
                - - Lourinhasaurus alenquerensis
                  - - Camarasaurus
                    - - Turiasaurus riodevensis
                      - Losillasaurus giganteus
              - - Brachiosaurus sp.
                - - Diplodocoidea
                  - Macronaria
                    - - Giraffatitan brancai
                      - Brachiosaurus altithorax
                    - - Ligabuesaurus leanzai
                      - Isisaurus colberti

== Palaeobiology ==
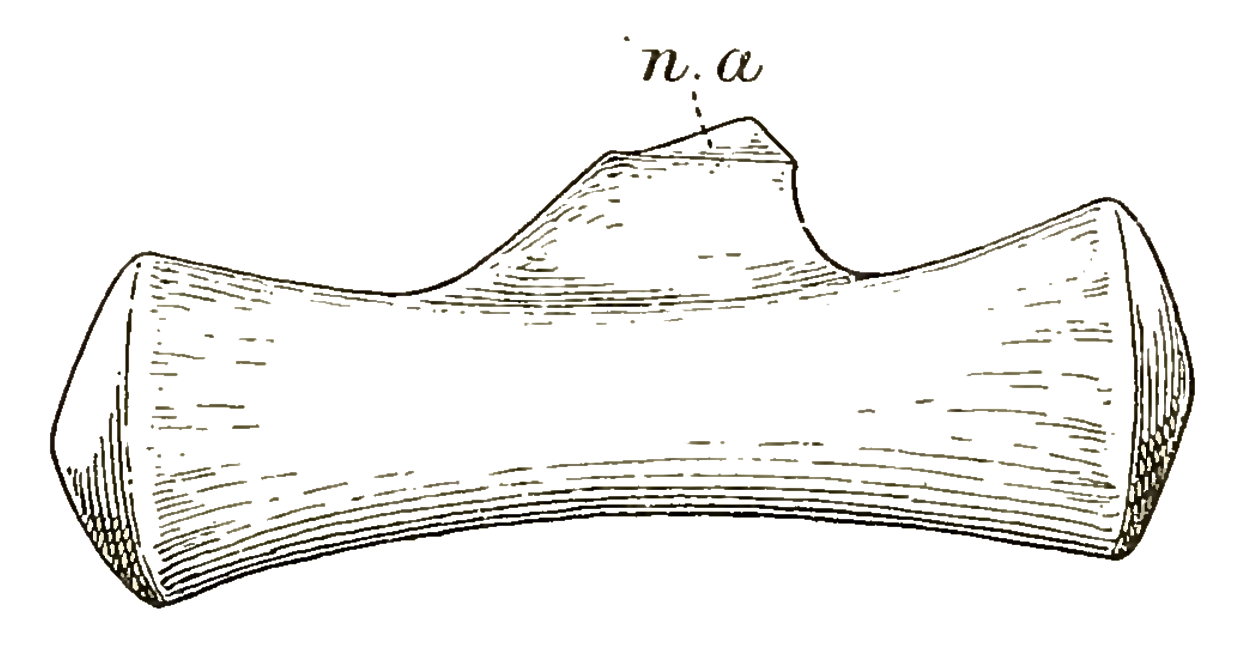
Unpathologic distal caudal of Cetiosauriscus? specimen NHMUK PV R1967

=== Palaeopathology ===
The series of distal caudal vertebrae NHMUK PV R1967, once referred to Cetiosauriscus, is similar to the caudals of Diplodocus, with two convex ends (biconvex) and a long and thin centrum. These caudals display signs of injury at two points along the series of ten vertebrae, where there are signs of breakage that was later healed. These lesions were identified as the same form of pathologies as found on the tail of Diplodocus. It has been suggested that the biconvex distal caudal vertebrae in sauropods were used for making whip-like cracking noise, being thin and delicate and not intended for impact, as the joints would be very vulnerable to damage rendering them useless.

=== Palaeoecology ===
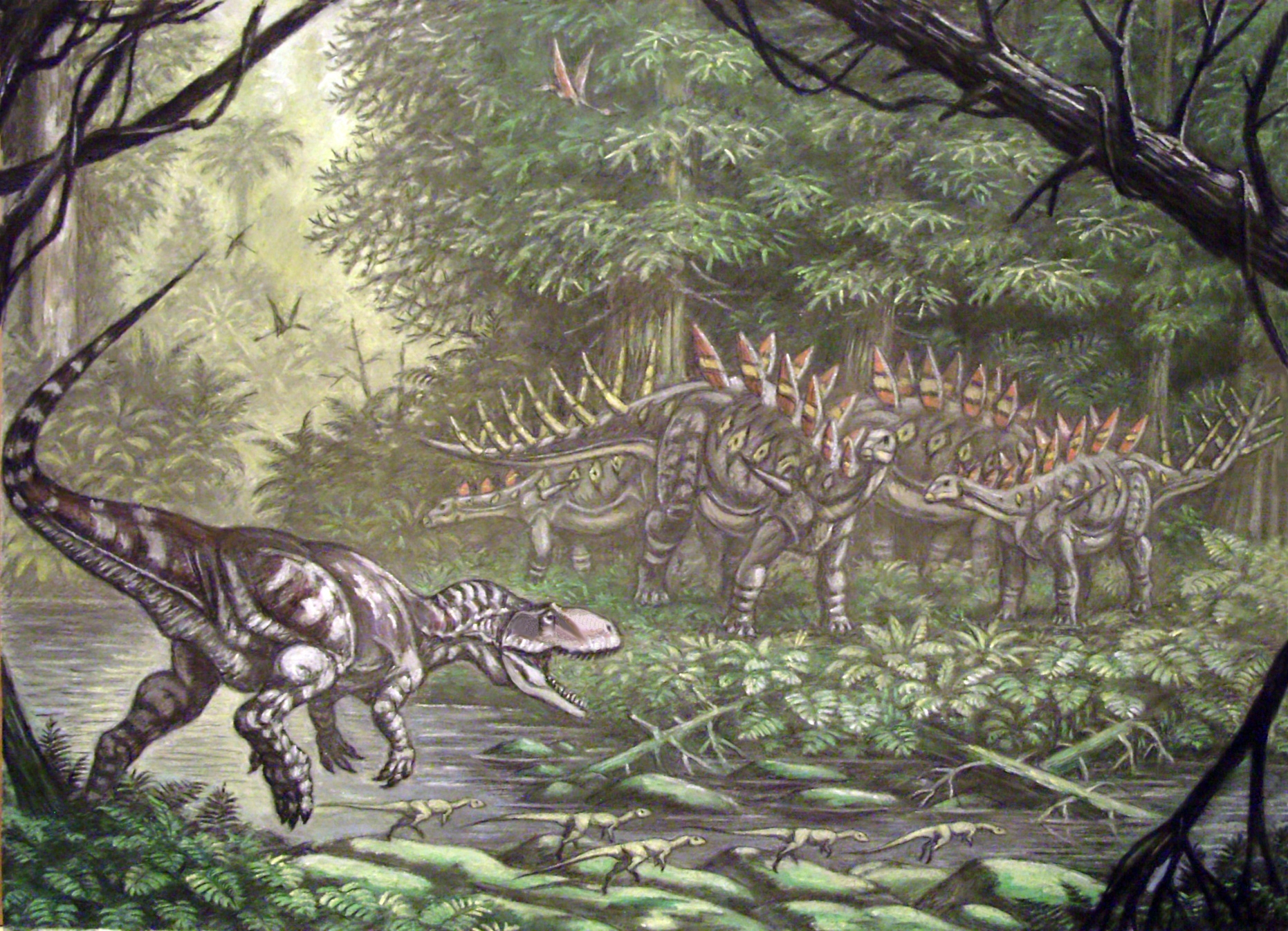
Life restoration of Eustreptospondylus facing Lexovisaurus in a forested environment. After death, the carcasses of these dinosaurs were deposited in marine sediments of the Oxford Clay Formation.

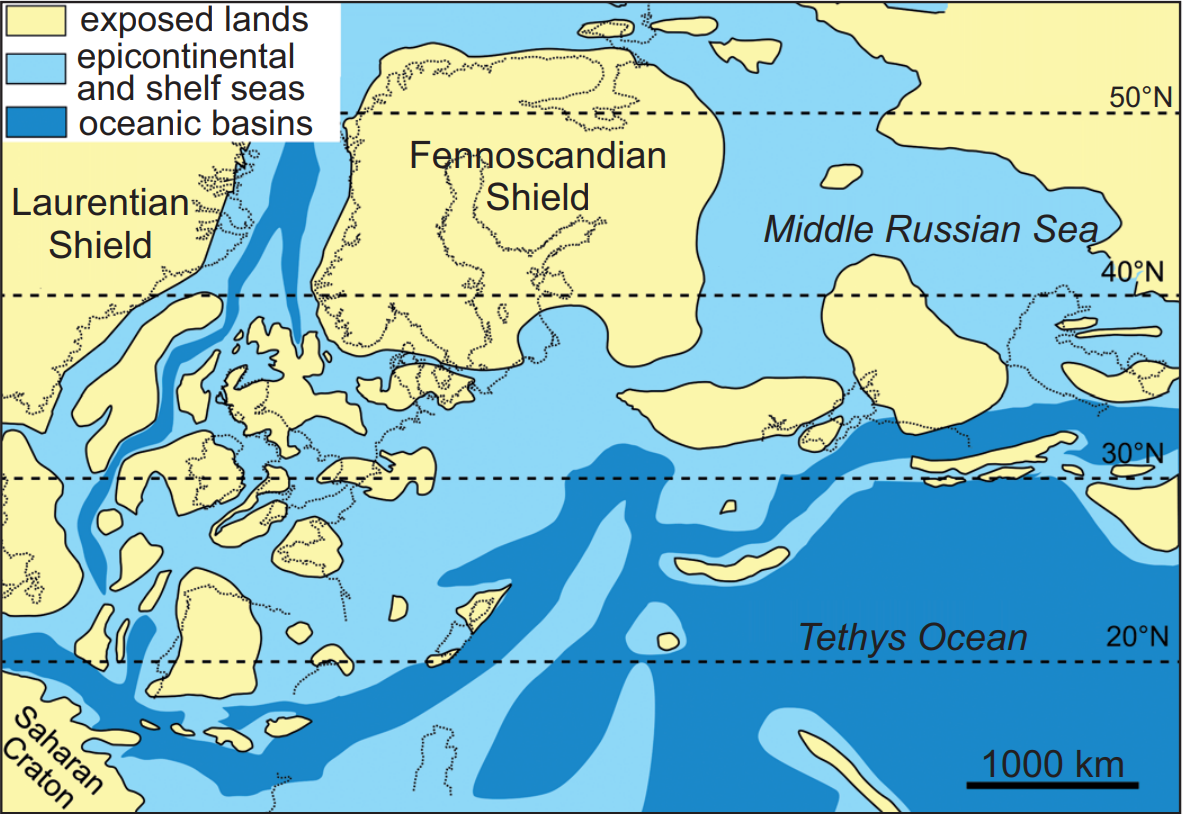
Map of Europe during the Callovian period when Cetiosauriscus lived

Cetiosauriscus lived during the Callovian, an epoch in the Middle Jurassic, about 166 to 164 mya. The single specimen is known from the Lower Member of the Oxford Clay Formation, along with multiple other dinosaur genera and many other groups of animals, in the biozone of the index fossil Kosmoceras jason. The Oxford Clay Formation is a marine deposit of southern and middle England, known for the high-quality preservation of some fossils and the large diversity of taxa. Sediments are generally brownish-grey mudstone, organic-rich with plentiful crushed ammonites and bivalves, at most 65 m (213 ft) thick. A large diversity of flora can be seen, preserved in the form of pollen and spores. Gymnosperms are present, along with pteridophytes, unidentifiable wood fragments, other intermediate pollen, and miscellaneous organic plant material.

The intermediate sauropod Ornithopsis leedsi is known from the same section of the formation as Cetiosauriscus, along with the stegosaurids Lexovisaurus durobrivensis and Loricatosaurus priscus (which are possibly synonyms), the basal ankylosaur Sarcolestes leedsi, the ornithopod Callovosaurus leedsi, and a second unnamed ornithopod taxon. Dinosaur eggs that have not yet been assigned to a taxon are also known from the Lower Oxford Clay. The theropods Eustreptospondylus and possibly Megalosaurus are also known from the Oxford Clay Formation, but slightly younger deposits (the Middle Member). In addition, the theropod Metriacanthosaurus is from an unknown level and age in the formation.

Hundreds of invertebrates are known from the marine deposits, including bivalves, gastropods, scaphopods, ammonites, teuthoids, a nautiloid, foraminifera, coelenterates, bryozoans, brachiopods, annelids, crustaceans, ostracods, cirripedes and echinoderms. Fish are known from the clades Elasmobranchii, Chimaera, and Actinopterygii, and the ichthyosaur Ophthalmosaurus, the plesiosaurs Cryptoclidus, Muraenosaurus, Tricleidus, Liopleurodon, Peloneustes, Pliosaurus and Simolestes, the crocodilians Metriorhynchus and Steneosaurus, and the pterosaur Rhamphorhynchus were all present.
