= Amanz Gressly =

Swiss paleontologist (1814–1865)

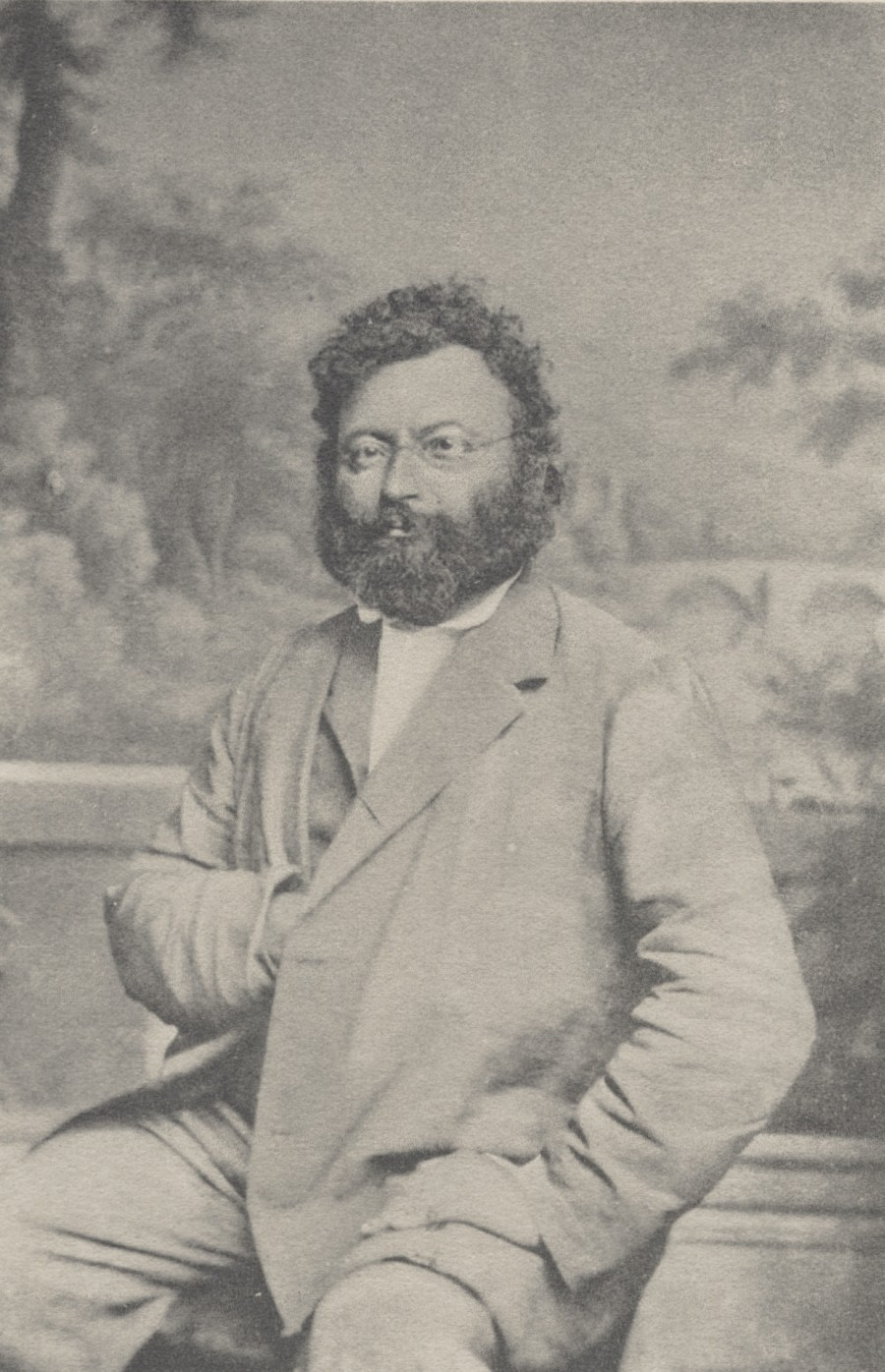
- Born: 17 July 1814; Bärschwil, Switzerland
- Died: 13 April 1865 (aged 50); Bern, Switzerland
- Known for: The concept of facies
- Scientific career
- Fields: Geology

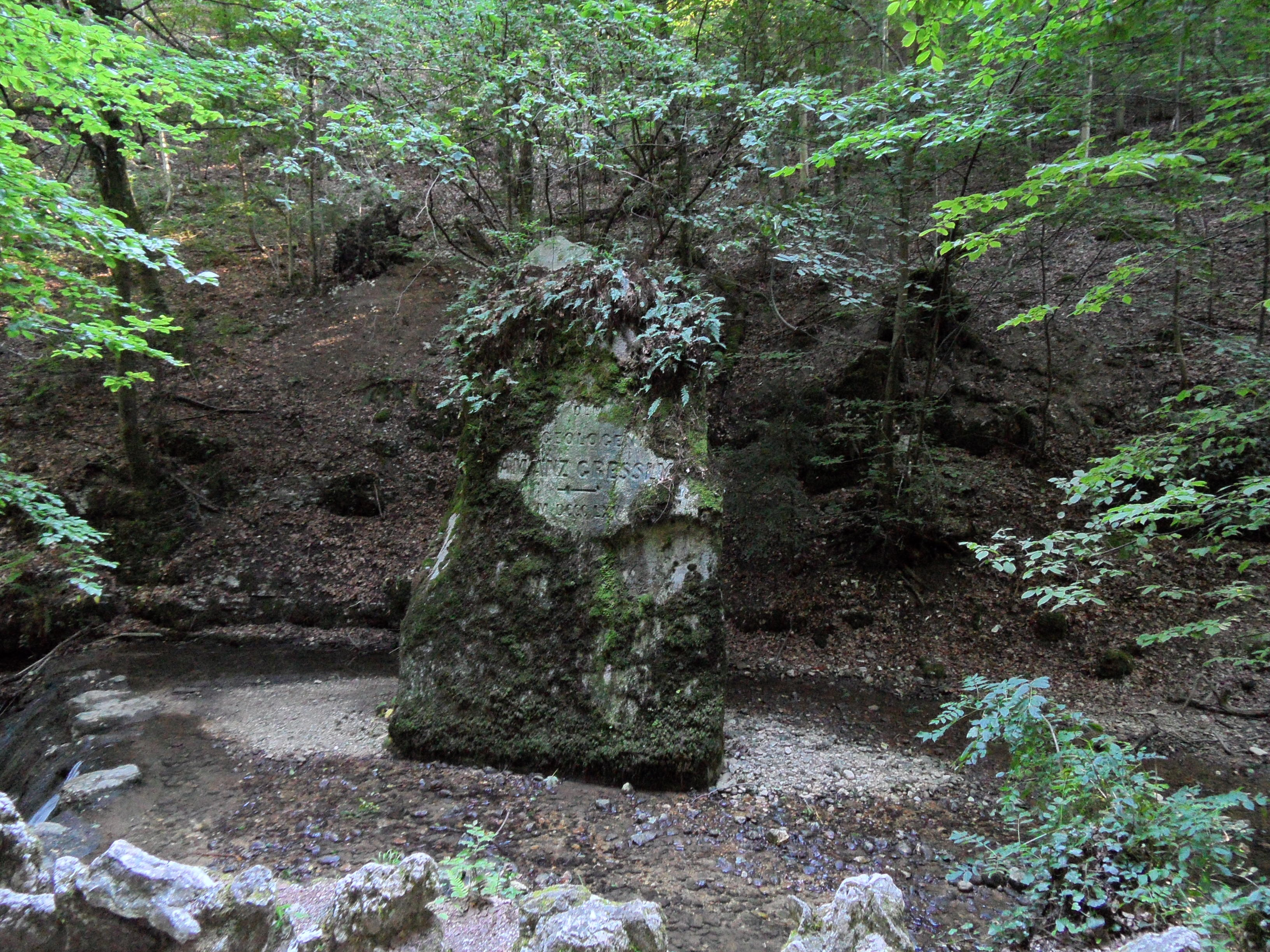
Memorial stone of Amanz Gressly at Verenaschlucht near Solothurn, Switzerland

Amanz Gressly (17 July 1814 – 13 April 1865) was a Swiss geologist and paleontologist. He introduced the use of the term facies in geology, and is considered one of the founders of modern stratigraphy and paleoecology.

He initially studied medicine at Strasbourg, but his interest subsequently switched to geology, and from 1836 onward, he worked as an assistant to Louis Agassiz. In 1838 he published Observations géologiques sur le Jura Soleurois (Geological observations involving the Solothurn Jura), in which he introduced the "concept of facies" to describe the environments and conditions of the origin of sedimentary rocks based on their petrographic attributes and fossil affiliations.

From 1853 he served as a geologist during the construction of rail tunnels through the Jura Mountains. In 1859 he was sent by Eduard Desor to Cette on the Gulf of Lyon in order to investigate the mode of life of marine organisms, and in 1861, with Carl Vogt and others, he embarked on a scientific expedition that took him to the North Cape, Jan Mayen and Iceland. The dinosaur genera Gresslyosaurus and Amanzia were named after him.

Near the end of his life, Gressly suffered a mental decline and was committed to an asylum near Bern. He died from a stroke in 1865. Gressly's colleague Oswald Heer wrote that shortly before his death Gressly started to suffer from hallucinations that he was transforming into the Gresslyosaurus.

Since 2004 the Swiss Paleontological Society has awarded the Amanz-Gressly-Auszeichnung for outstanding achievements in the field of paleontology.
