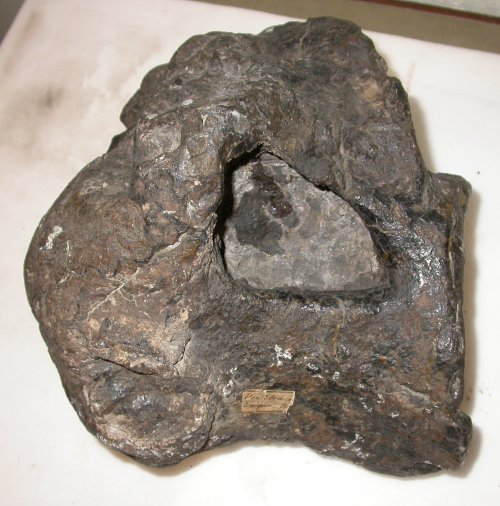
- Lectotype vertebra NHMUK R 28632

Scientific classification
- Kingdom: Animalia
- Phylum: Chordata
- Class: Reptilia
- Clade: Dinosauria
- Clade: Saurischia
- Clade: †Sauropodomorpha
- Clade: †Sauropoda
- Clade: †Macronaria
- Clade: †Titanosauriformes
- Genus: †Ornithopsis; Seeley, 1870
- Species: †O. hulkei

Binomial name
- †Ornithopsis hulkei Seeley, 1870

Synonyms
- Bothriospondylus magnus Owen, 1875; Chondrosteosaurus magnus (Owen, 1875) Owen, 1876

= Ornithopsis =

Ornithopsis Temporal range: Early Cretaceous, Barremian

Extinct genus of dinosaurs

Ornithopsis (meaning "bird-likeness") is a genus of sauropod dinosaur from the Early Cretaceous of England and possibly Germany. The type species, which is the only species seen as valid today, is O. hulkei, which is only known from fragmentary remains.

== History of discovery ==
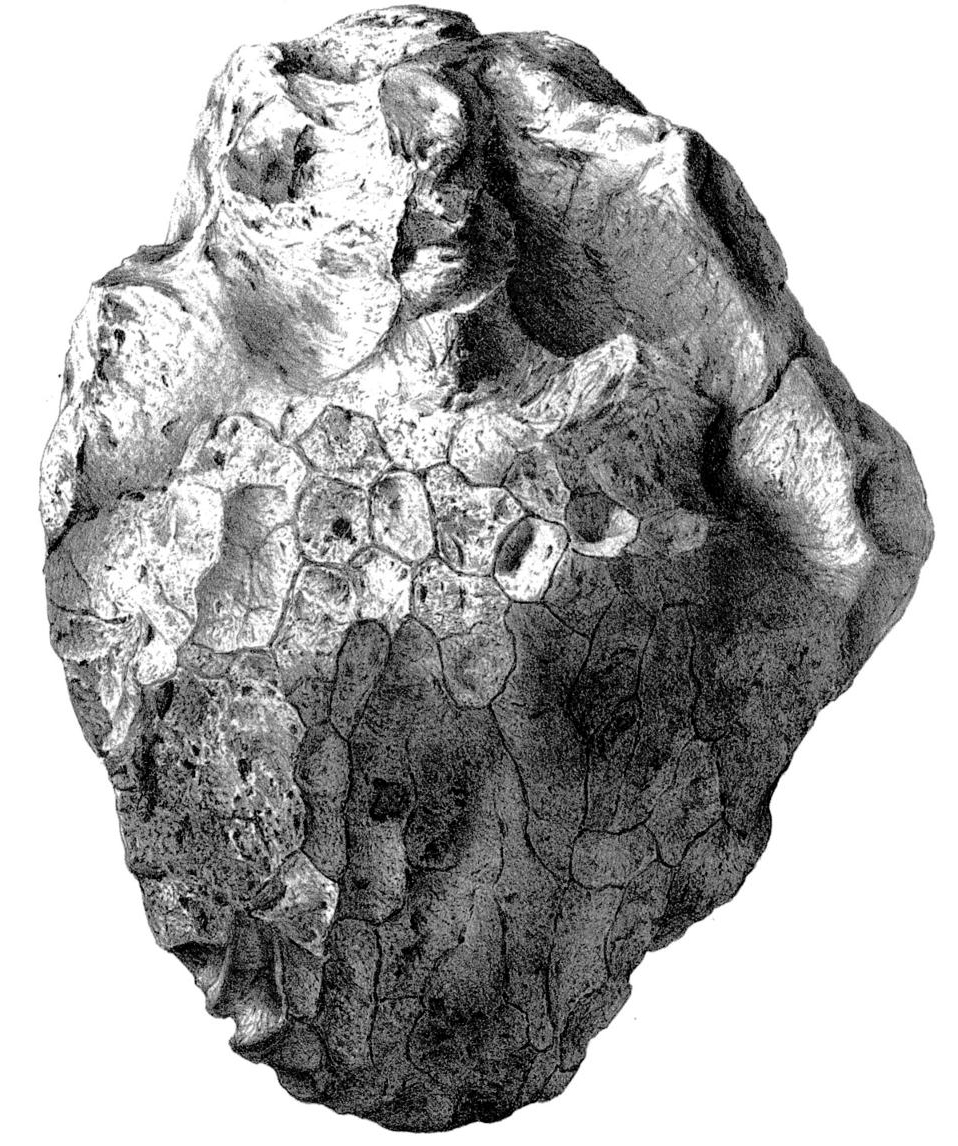
Vertebra NHMUK PV R 28632 in anterior view showing internal texture

Gideon Algernon Mantell described many fossils that had been previously collected from the Tilgate Forest of the Early Cretaceous Wealden Formation in his 1833 paper on the geology of southeast England, including a bone he considered to be the quadrate of Iguanodon, otherwise only known definitively from teeth that had been found in the area since 1822. The bone was redescribed by Richard Owen in 1854, who reaffirmed its referral as a quadrate of Iguanodon, but also suggested it could be the same bone of Streptospondylus or Cetiosaurus as it was not directly associated with the characteristic teeth of Iguanodon. This specimen is stored as British Museum of Natural History R2239, having been purchased from Mantell in 1838.

Specimen NHMUK PV R 28632, a similar bone to NHMUK PV R 2239 was described in 1870 by Harry Govier Seeley, found in the deposits on the Isle of Wight and purchased from Mantell by the British Museum in 1853. Seeley properly identified the two fossils as vertebrae, and noted that the features considered by Mantell and Owen to indicate the tympanic cavity was in fact openings in the walls of the vertebral centrum, showing that the bones were invaded by cavities for air sacs as seen in both pterosaurs and modern birds. Seeley gave the name Ornithopsis hulkei for the vertebrae, named in honour of his colleague John Whitaker Hulke, considering the taxon to be between pterosaurs and birds, and possibly allied with dinosaurs. The genus name is derived from Greek ὄρνις, "bird" and ὄψις, "likeness".

Owen revisited the material in 1875, where he described multiple new species within his new genus Bothriospondylus. Agreeing with the vertebral identity of NHMUK PV R 2239, but considering it closer to the type species Bothriospondylus suffossus than any flying animal as Seeley had suggested, Owen gave the new species name Bothriospondylus elongatus for the specimen. For NHMUK PV R 28632, Owen named the new species Bothriospondylus magnus, as he did not consider the two Wealden vertebrae to belong to the same taxon. Owen heavily disagreed with the interpretations of Seeley that the vertebrae were open and lightly constructed and showed relationships to birds and pterosaurs, considering the name Ornithopsis to be glaringly false and thus suggesting his new names should have priority over Seeley's older designations. Owen then reassigned B. magnus to the genus Chondrosteosaurus as Chondrosteosaurus magnus in 1876, considering it closely related to the type species Chondrosteosaurus gigas from the Wealden.

Hulke described additional sauropod material from the Wealden in 1879, and reevaluated the designations used by Owen and Seeley. Hulke identified NHMUK PV R 28632 as the type of O. hulkei, rendering Bothriospondylus magnus and Chondrosteosaurus magnus as junior objective synonyms. As well, Hulke noted that the comment of Owen that the name Ornithopsis was misleading was false, as the vertebrae were lightly-constructed regardless of their relationships. Hulke also referred the genus Eucamerotus, named earlier by him in 1870, and the genus Chondrosteosaurus to Ornithopsis as junior synonyms, with other fossils found in the Wealden beds showing that they all shared the unique internal structure of Ornithopsis. Though William Blows identified in 1995 that most of the Wealden sauropod material has been designated as dubious or intermediate, the type vertebra of Ornithopsis shows unique features in its lateral compression and a ventral ridge, and represents a diagnostic titanosauriform.

In 2023, a fragmentary dorsal vertebra from the Balve in northwestern Germany, preserved in limestone dating to the Late Barremian-Early Aptian, was described. It was referred to Ornithopsis sp.? because it also possesses the lateral compression considered unique to Ornithopsis. However, the poor preservation of the specimen makes the referral tentative.

=== Additional species ===
Hulke described pelvis material, NHMUK PV R 97, from the Wealden in 1882, found associated with a few vertebrae, as the new species Ornithopsis eucamerotus. He retained Eucamerotus and Chondrosteosaurus as synonyms of Ornithopsis, but suggested that O. hulkei should only contain the original vertebra NHMUK PV R 2239. The designation by Hulke of NHMUK PV R 2239 as type conflicted with his earlier assertion that NHMUK PV R 28632 was the type, so Lydekker corrected this in 1888 by formally designated NHMUK PV R 28632 as the only type with the consultation of Seeley.

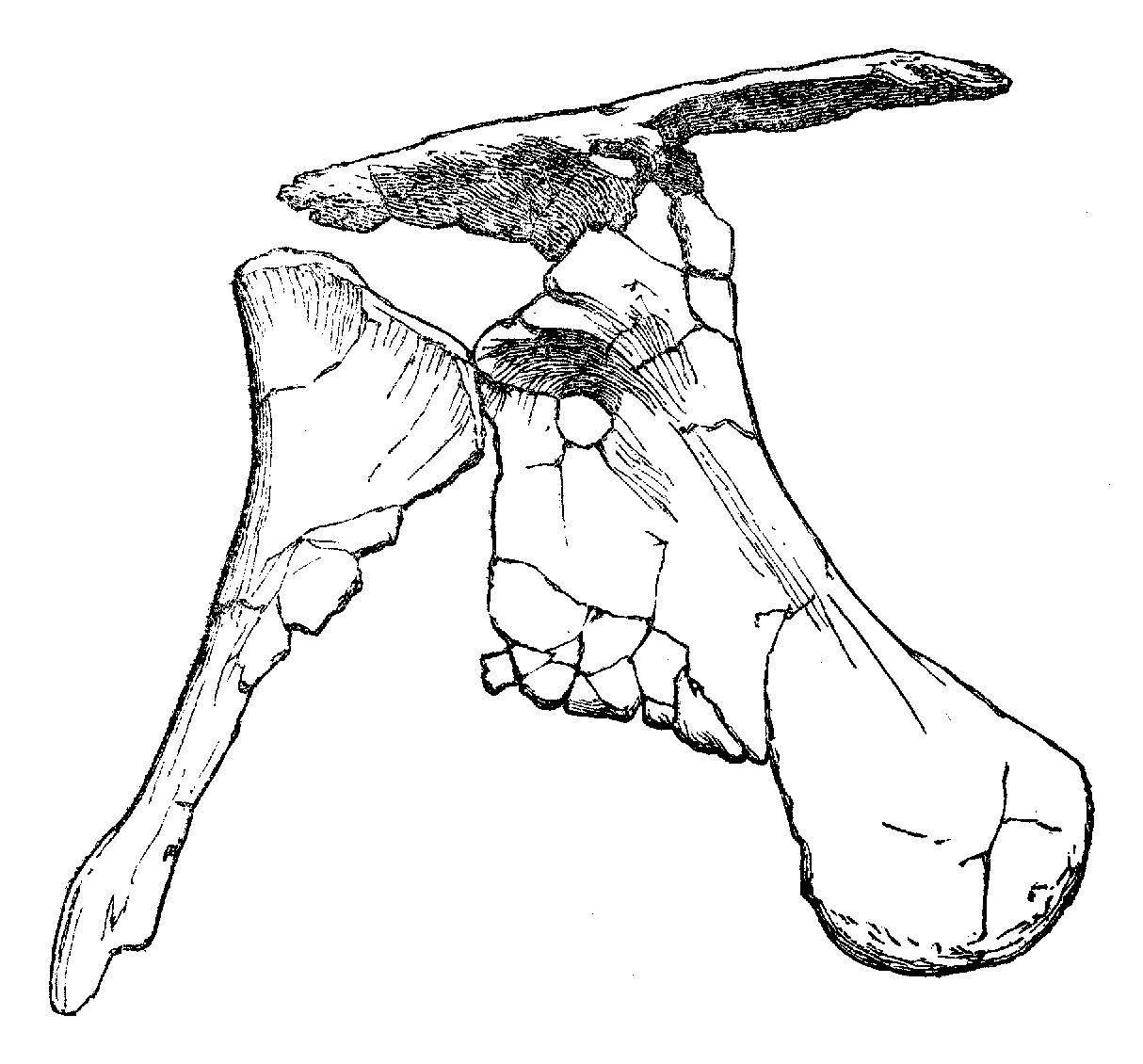
Pelvis of Ornithopsis leedsii (NHMUK PV R 1988)

Hulke described more material as Ornithopsis in 1887, for some vertebrae, ribs, a pelvis, and fragments collected in the Eyesbury Jurassic deposits of Northamptonshire by Alfred Nicholson Leeds. The vertebrae and pelvis showed many similarities with the specimens of Ornithopsis from the Wealden Group, but the much larger size of the Eyesbury specimens, their robusticity, and their older age were considered sufficient to describe as a new species, which Hulke named Ornithopsis leedsii after the discoverer Alfred Leeds. Hulke placed the genus within the sauropod family Atlantosauridae, suggesting a close relationship with Cetiosaurus oxoniensis. The specimens named as Ornithopsis leedsii are stored as specimens NHMUK PV R 1985-1988, having been collected in May of 1892, and possibly being the first sauropod collected by Leeds and his brothers. Unlike the other specimens, O. leedsii came from the lower Callovian deposits of the Kellaways Formation below the Oxford Clay where most specimens were derived from.

Hulke described a humerus found in 1868 by J.C. Mansel in the Kimmeridge Clay in 1869, considering it a large saurian possibly related to Cetiosaurus or Pelorosaurus. He then gave it the name Ischyrosaurus in 1874, reiterating its close relationship to Cetiosaurus oxoniensis, Cetiosaurus humerocristatus, and Gigantosaurus. Though it was not given a species name at the time, Richard Lydekker identified it as the species Ornithopsis manseli in 1887 based on an unpublished manuscript name provided by Hulke, as well as describing additional Wealden material as O. hulkei, and suggesting Cetiosaurus humerocristatus was a synonym of O. leedsii. Cetiosaurus oxoniensis was reassigned to Ornithopsis as O. oxoniensis in 1888 by Harry Govier Seeley, a proposal that was not endorsed at the time by Lydekker, who also suggested that O. leedsii and O. humerocristatus were possibly distinct based on a difference in age, but that Chondrosteosaurus and Ornithopsis eucamerotus were synonyms of O. hulkei. Ornithopsis leedsii was referred to as the species Pelorosaurus leedsi by Lydekker in 1895, and as the taxon Cetiosaurus leedsi by Arthur Smith Woodward in the 1905, which are incorrect spellings of the species name.

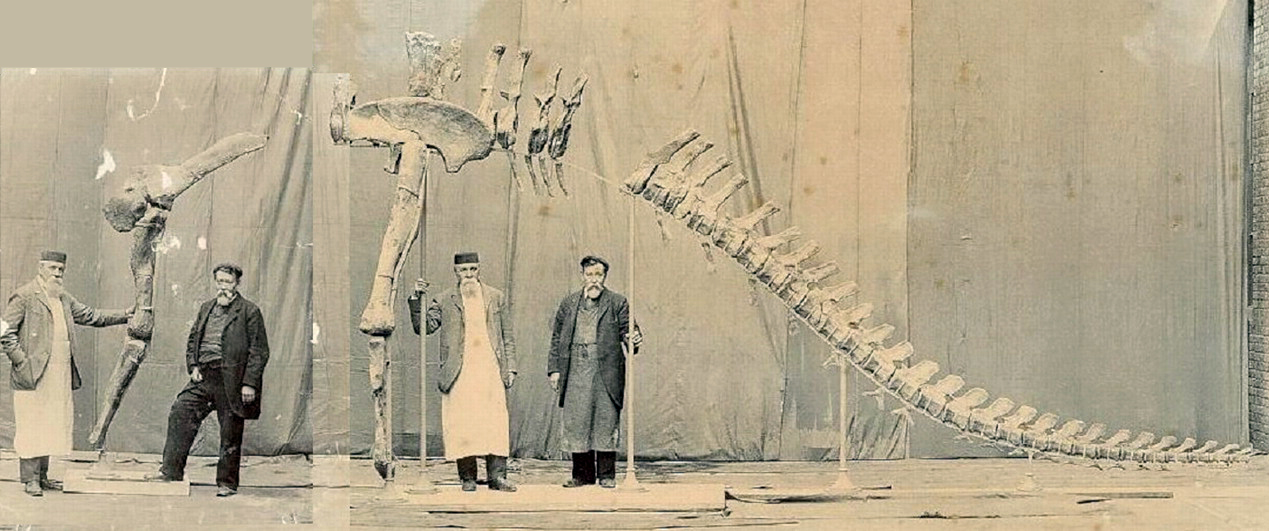
Mounted skeleton of NHMUK PV R 3078, now Cetiosauriscus stewarti

Cetiosaurus leedsii (spelled as "leedsi") had additional remains referred to it by Woodward in 1905, including the anterior caudal vertebrae NHMUK PV R 1984, the distal caudals NHMUK PV R 1967, and the posterior skeleton NHMUK PV R 3078, which preserved most of the arm, leg, pelvis, and vertebrae behind the shoulders. The species was assigned to Cetiosaurus as the vertebrae were differently textured, so Woodward considered an assignment to Cetiosaurus more proper. Friedrich von Huene did not think the referral of the species to Cetiosaurus should be supported, and referred to the taxon as "Cetiosaurus" leedsi. Huene also described the species Ornithopsis (?) greppini in the same study in 1921, for a long-tailed cetiosaurid from Jurassic deposits around Bern, Switzerland. Huene retained O. greppini in the genus in an early 1927 review of sauropods, considering the genus to contain the species Ornithopsis hulkei, O. leedsii, O. humerocristatus, O. manseli, and O. (?) greppini, with the genus representing taxon within Cetiosauridae alongside Cetiosaurus, Bothriospondylus, Pelorosaurus, Dinodocus, and possibly Rhoetosaurus and "Morosaurus" brevis. Later in the same year, Huene revised his classification, naming the new genus Cetiosauriscus for O. leedsii as described by Woodward, and O. (?) greppini.

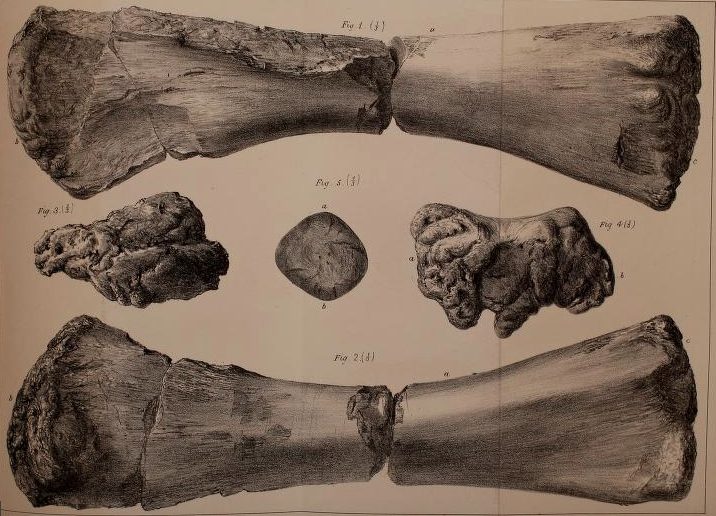
Humerus of O. manseli

As the holotype material of Ornithopsis/Cetiosauriscus leedsii was not considered diagnostic, the more complete specimen NHMUK PV R 3078 was referred to the new taxon Cetiosauriscus stewarti, which was then designated as the type species of Cetiosauriscus as it contained the material Huene had originally named the new genus for. Cetiosaurus leedsi was then assigned to an intermediate member of Brachiosauridae, considered to be a proper species of Ornithopsis, or an improper species of Ornithopsis that is an indeterminate eusauropod. Ornithopsis greppini was given the new genus name Amanzia in a 2020 redescription of the original material.

As Ischyrosaurus was used earlier by Edward Drinker Cope for the non-mammalian genus Ischyrotherium in 1869, the name "Ischyrosaurus" cannot be used for I. manseli, and so the species was retained as Ornithopsis manseli by David Martill and colleagues in 2006. The species has also been considered as Pelorosaurus manseli. Upchurch et al., in their review of sauropods (2004), listed it as a dubious sauropod. A 2010 overview of Late Jurassic sauropods from Dorset noted that O. manseli shared features seen in both Rebbachisauridae and Titanosauriformes, but lacked features to nail down its exact phylogenetic position.

== Description ==
The Ornithopsis hulkei holotype is basically a centrum lacking the neural spine. The vertebra is heavily pneumatised, filled with large cavities, camellae. It is narrow, tall, has a ridge on the underside, is opisthocoelous and has a posteriorly placed deep subtriangular pleurocoel over two thirds of its length. These features are compatible with a placement within the Titanosauriformes.

Based on comparison with Giraffatitan, the holotype specimen is estimated to be 16–18 m (52–59 ft) in length, with the possible German specimen belonging to a slightly smaller individual.
