= Peter Merian =

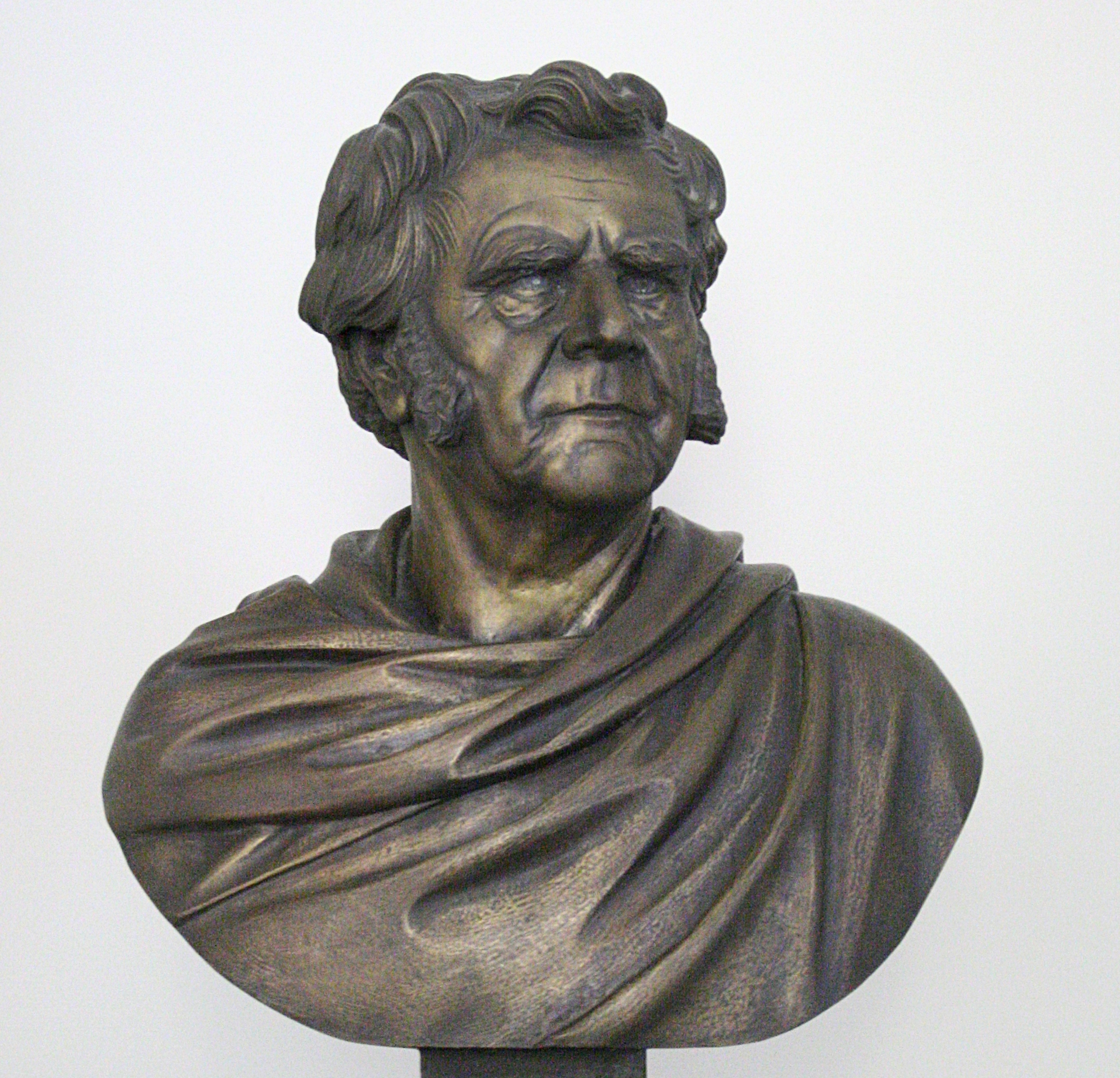
- Bust of Peter Merian at the Museum for Natural History in Basel.
- Born: 20 December 1795; Basel, Switzerland
- Died: 8 February 1883 (aged 87); Basel, Switzerland
- Occupation: Swiss geologist

Peter Merian-Thurneysen (20 December 1795 – 8 February 1883) was a Swiss geologist and palaeontologist.

He studied sciences at the University of Basel, the Academy of Geneva and at the University of Göttingen (1815–17), where he studied geology under Johann Friedrich Ludwig Hausmann. At Göttingen he became good friends with Bernhard Studer. After obtaining his doctorate, he continued his education in Paris up until 1819, and then returned to Basel and proceeded to conduct geological studies of the Swiss Jura.

In 1820 he was named professor of physics and chemistry at Basel, and during the following year, became director of the Natural History Museum. From 1835 to 1861, he was an honorary professor of geology and palaeontology at Basel, where three times he served as university rector. In 1838 and 1856 he was president of the Schweizer Naturforschenden Gesellschaft.

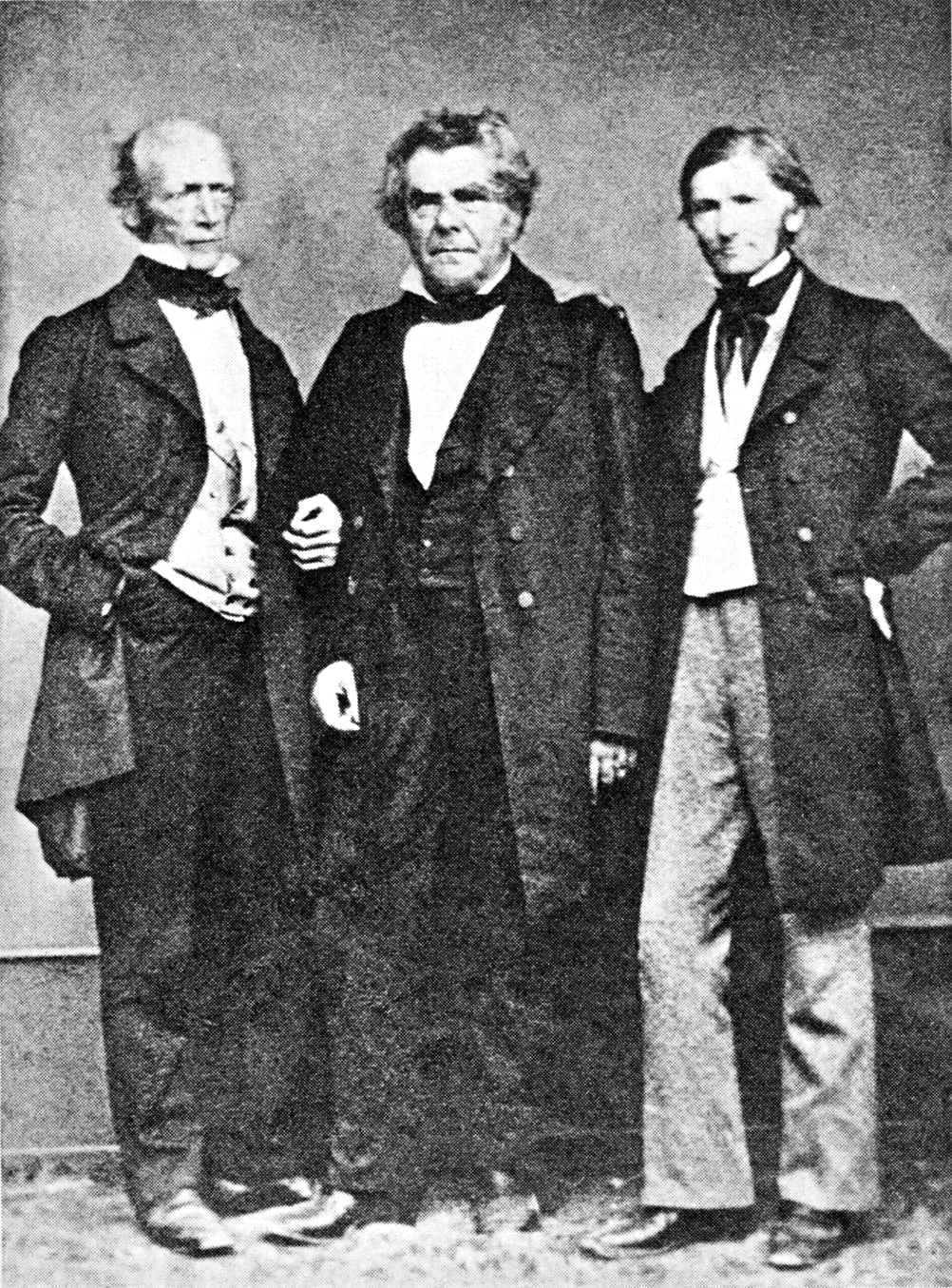
From the right: Arnold Escher von der Linth, Peter Merian and Oswald Heer (daguerreotype).

Known for his scientific investigations of Jura Mountains, he also conducted extensive geological research of the Black Forest, and performed comparison studies of the Germanic and Alpine Triassic stages. During his career, he amassed an impressive collection of fossils, and is credited for developing a classification schema for ammonites. In addition, he made contributions in the fields of meteorology and glaciology.

== Selected works ==
- Uebersicht der Beschaffenheit der Gebirgsbildungen in den Umgebungen von Basel : mit besonderer Hinsicht auf das Juragebirge im Allgemeinen, 1821 – Overview on the formation of mountains in the environs of Basel with particular regard to the Jura Mountains in general.
- Uebersicht des Zustandes unserer Kenntniss der Naturkunde des Kantons Basel, 1826 – Overview on the natural history of the canton of Basel.
- Geognostische Uebersicht des südlichen Schwarzwaldes, 1831 – Geognostic survey of the southern Black Forest.
- Mittel und Hauptresultate aus den meteorologischen Beobachtungen in Basel von 1826 bis 1836, 1838 – Means and main results of the meteorological observations in Basel from 1826 to 1836.
- Ueber die Theorie der Gletscher, 1843 – On the theory of glaciers.
