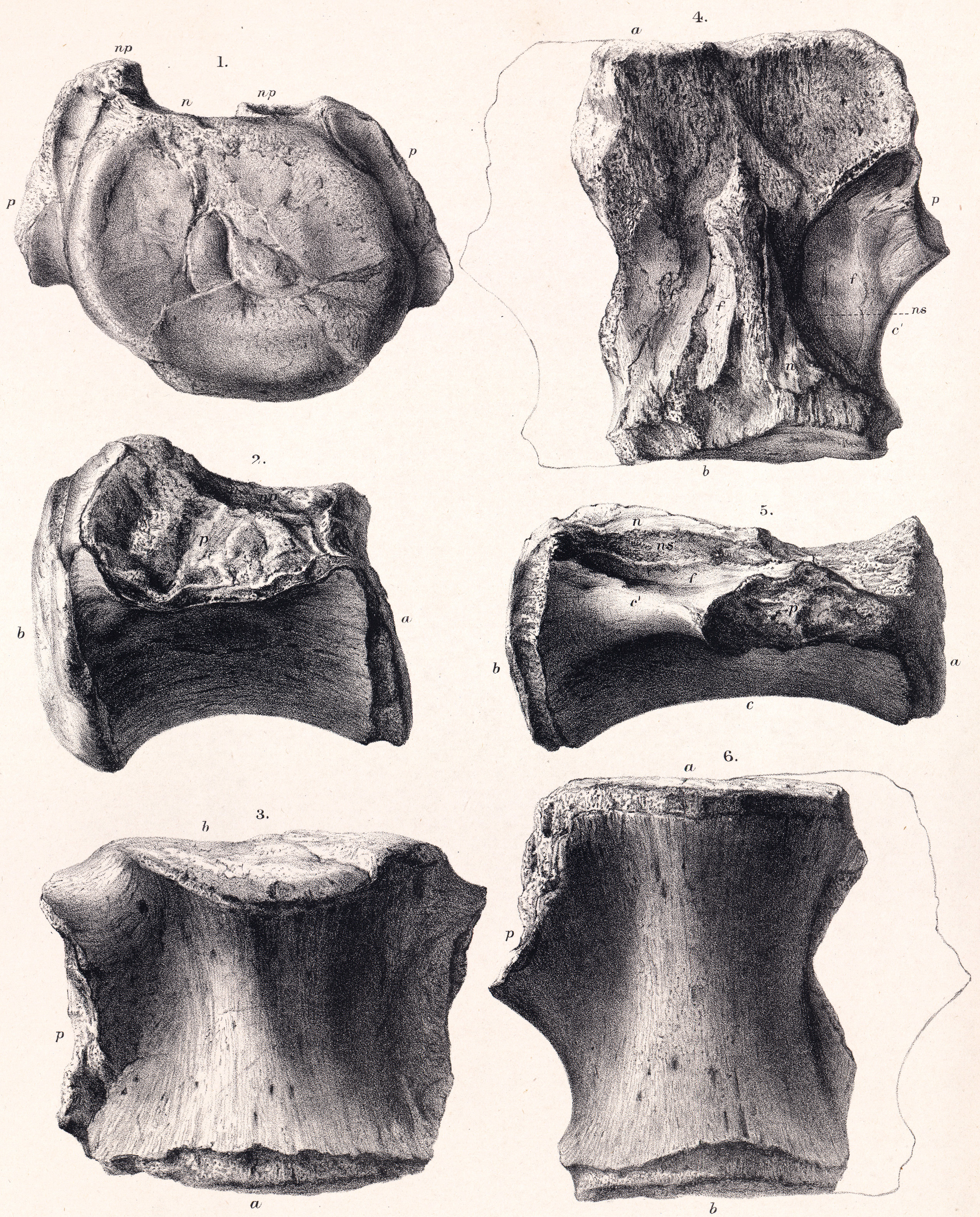
- Illustration of the holotype vertebrae of B. suffosus

Scientific classification
- Kingdom: Animalia
- Phylum: Chordata
- Class: Reptilia
- Clade: Dinosauria
- Clade: Saurischia
- Clade: †Sauropodomorpha
- Clade: †Sauropoda
- Clade: †Neosauropoda (?)
- Genus: †Bothriospondylus; Owen, 1875
- Species: †B. suffossus

Binomial name
- †Bothriospondylus suffossus Owen, 1875

Synonyms
- Ornithopsis suffossa von Huene, 1922

= Bothriospondylus =

Bothriospondylus Temporal range: Late Jurassic, 157–152.2 Ma

Extinct genus of dinosaurs

Bothriospondylus (from Ancient Greek βοθρίον (bothríon), meaning "trench", and σπόνδυλος (spóndulos), meaning "vertebra") is a dubious genus of possibly neosauropodan sauropod dinosaur. It lived during the Late Jurassic in England and the type (and only) species is B. suffossus.

== Discovery and naming ==
The type species, Bothriospondylus suffossus, was described by Richard Owen in 1875. The specific epithet suffossus means "undermined" in Latin, a reference to the fact that pleurocoels had hollowed out the sides of the vertebra. It is often incorrectly spelled as "suffosus". Owen based the species on holotype NHMUK PV R 44592-5, a set of four dorsal vertebrae found in Wiltshire in stratum from the Kimmeridgian, the Kimmeridge Clay. Also three unfused sacral vertebrae were referred.

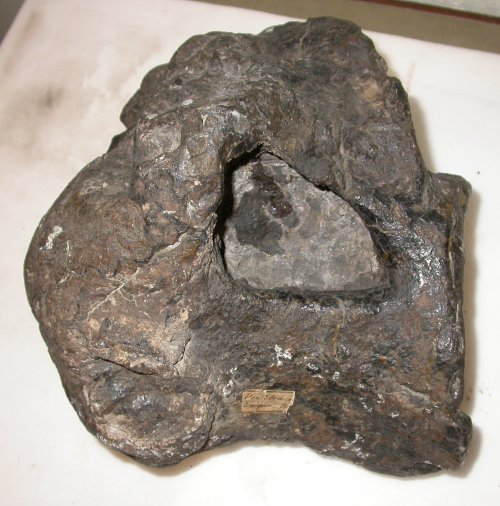
Holotype of B. magnus (Lectotype of Ornithopsis)

At the same time Owen named three other species of Bothriospondylus. B. robustus was based on NHMUK PV R 22428, a dorsal from the same location. B. elongatus was based on a vertebra from Sussex, NHMUK PV R 2239, an original syntype of Ornithopsis hulkei. Finally, Bothriospondylus magnus was a new name for another syntype of Ornithopsis hulkei Seeley 1870, the present lectotype NHMUK PV OR 28632. Owen himself in an addendum to the same publication renamed B. robustus to Marmarospondylus robustus. Friedrich von Huene in 1908 referred the material to Pelorosaurus and in 1922 made B. suffossus into a Ornithopsis suffossa because the latter generic name has priority.

More complete material from Madagascar was named by Richard Lydekker as a fifth species, Bothriospondylus madagascariensis. Franz Nopcsa in 1902 assigned to Bothriospondylus a vertebra from Argentina that later would be renamed Nopcsaspondylus. A skeleton from France was assigned to Bothriospondylus madagascariensis, but has been described as a new genus and species of brachiosaurid, Vouivria.

In 1986 José Fernando Bonaparte erected a new genus and species Lapparentosaurus madagascariensis, for specimens formerly assigned to Bothriospondylus from Madagascar.

A revision in 2010 by Philip Mannion concluded that Bothriospondylus is a nomen dubium. However, "Bothriospondylus" madagascariensis was treated as valid and distinct from other Middle Jurassic sauropods from Madagascar. It was named Narindasaurus thevenini by Royo-Torres et al. in 2020.

== Classification ==
Bothriospondylus has over the years been assigned to many groups — even in a Bothriospondylidae of its own — with Brachiosauridae lately being the most popular designation. However, the sparse and eroded material shows no synapomorphies of the Brachiosauridae and cannot be further determined than a very general Neosauropoda.

=== Current species ===
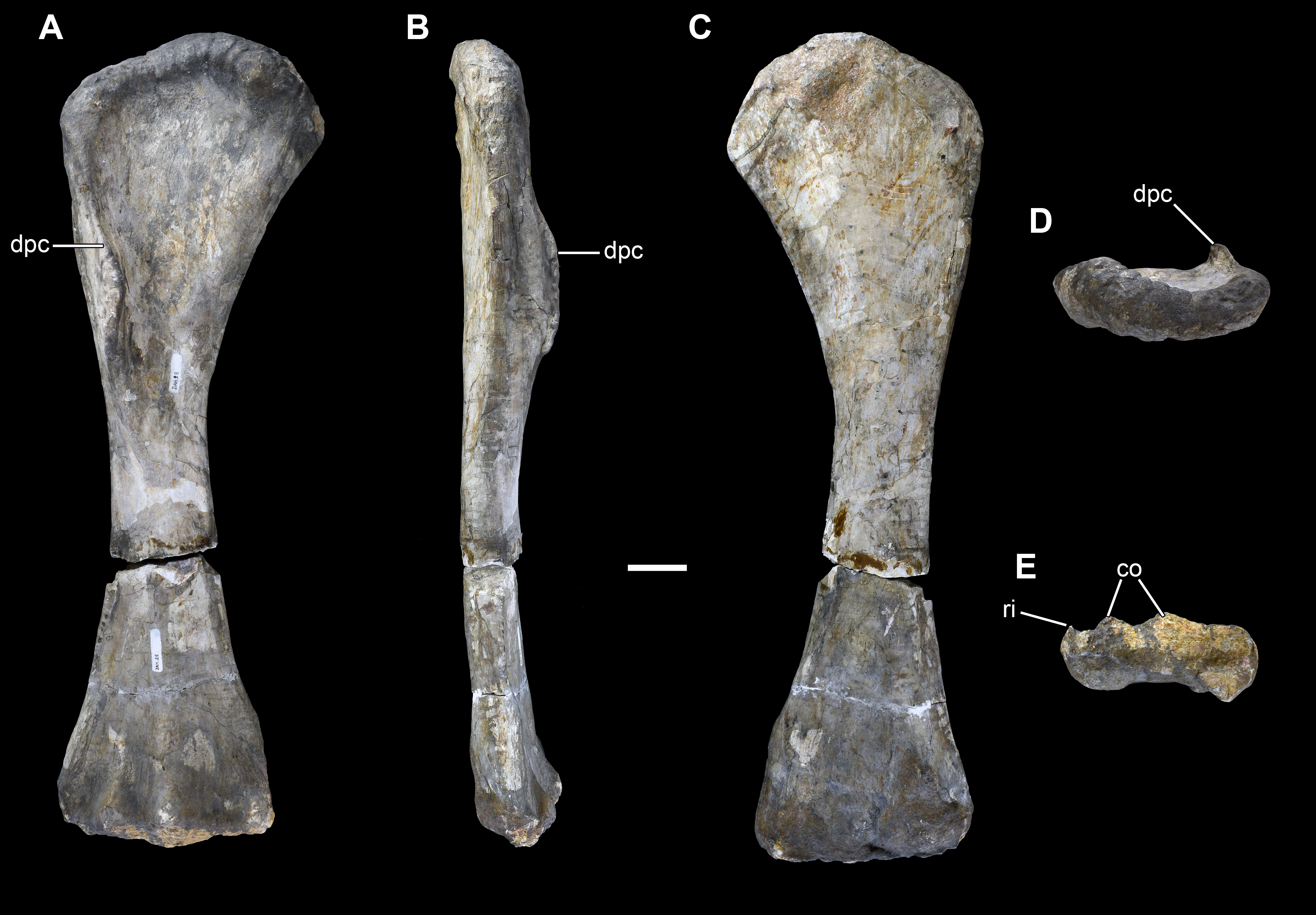
Humerus of "B. madagascariensis" (Vouivria)

Only the type species of Bothriospondylus can be referred, because of the dubious nature of the genus.

- Bothriospondylus suffossus Owen, 1875 (type species) = Ornithopsis suffosa (Owen, 1875) von Huene, 1922

=== Reassigned species ===
Several species have been referred to Bothriospondylus over its existence, with nearly all being reassigned to a new genus.

- Bothriospondylus robustus Owen, 1875 renamed Marmarospondylus (Owen, 1875) Owen, 1875
- Bothriospondylus elongatus Owen, 1875 non Bothriospondylus
- Bothriospondylus magnus Owen, 1875 objective synonym of Ornithopsis hulkei Seeley, 1870
- Bothriospondylus madagascariensis Lydekker, 1895 renamed Vouivria (Mannion, Allain & Moine, 2017)
- "Bothriospondylus madagascariensis" Lydekker, 1895 removed from species and named Lapparentosaurus Bonaparte, 1986
- "Bothriospondylus" Lydekker, 1895
- "Bothriospondylus" madagascariensis Lydekker, 1895 NHM R2598 NHM R2596–2615, R16588, R16589 Isalo III Formation, Madagascar, Middle Jurassic, Non neosauropod-eusauropod distinct from Lapparentosaurus. Named Narindasaurus Royo-Torres et al., 2020
