= Bothriospondylus madagascariensis =

Scientific classification
- Kingdom: Animalia
- Phylum: Chordata
- Class: Reptilia
- Clade: Dinosauria
- Clade: Saurischia
- Clade: †Sauropodomorpha
- Clade: †Sauropoda
- Genus: †Bothriospondylus
- Species: †B. madagascariensis

Binomial name
- †Bothriospondylus madagascariensis Lydekker, 1895

Species of reptile (fossil)

Bothriospondylus madagascariensis is a dubious nominal species of sauropod dinosaur. It was named in 1895 by Richard Lydekker as a species of Bothriospondylus, but the specimens the species was based on are no longer considered to belong to Bothriospondylus and are considered to be Eusauropoda incertae sedis. The taxonomic history of B. madagascariensis is intertwined with that of Lapparentosaurus madagascariensis, Vouivria damparisensis, and Narindasaurus thevenini.

== History of study ==
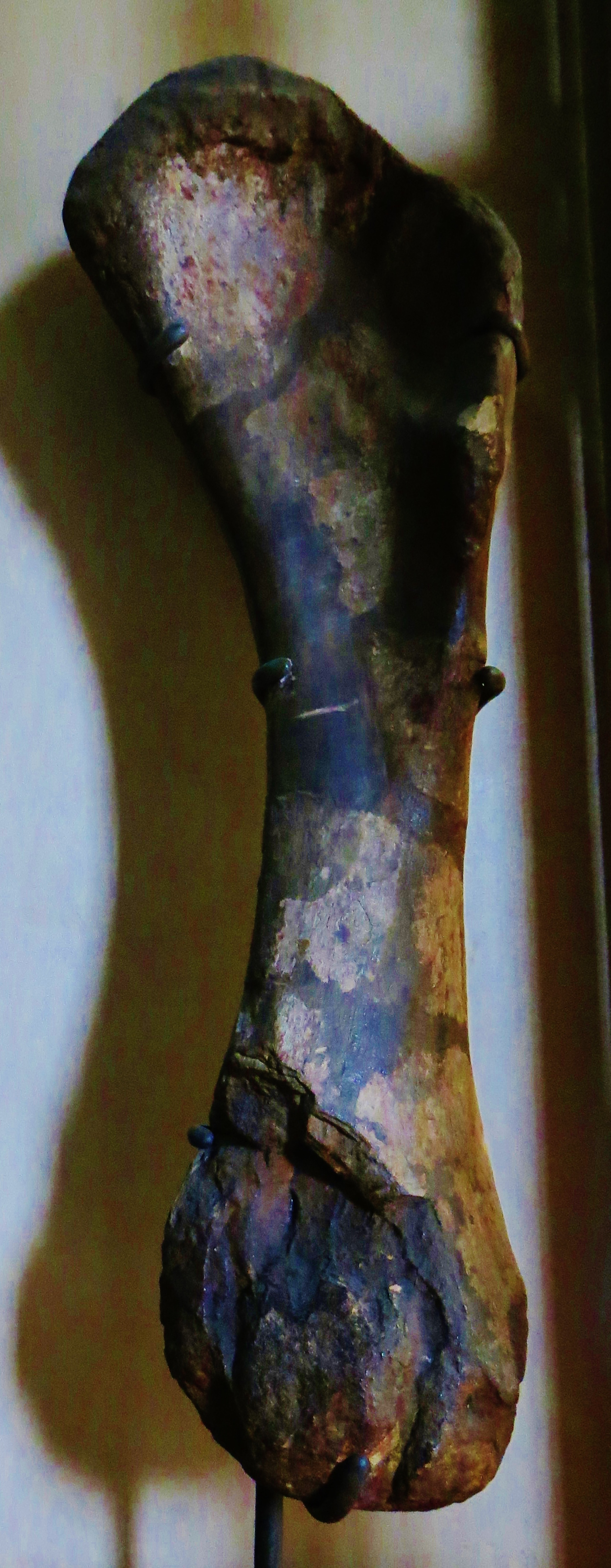
Bothriospondylus madagascariensis humerus

In 1894, the Natural History Museum, London purchased a series of sauropod vertebrae and limb bones, representing multiple individuals, that had been collected by J. L. Last and E. Gerrard from a site 20 miles east of Narinda Bay in northwestern Madagascar. The rock layer the specimens were collected from is now considered to be part of the Isalo III Formation. In 1895, Richard Lydekker described the specimens as a new species of Bothriospondylus, B. madagascariensis. He designated an incomplete dorsal vertebra, NHMUK R2598, as the type specimen.

In 1907, Armand Thevenin described additional sauropod material from Madagascar that he referred to B. madagascariensis. One of the specimens described by Thevenin was later described as representing a new genus and species, Narindasaurus thevenini, in 2021.

In 1943, Albert-Félix de Lapparent described a specimen from Damparis, France that he identified as belonging to B. madagascariensis. This specimen, which became known as the "French Bothriospondylus" or "Damparis Sauropod", was eventually reevaluated as representing a new genus and species of brachiosaurid, Vouivria damparisensis, in 2017.

René Lavocat identified another specimen as Bothriospondylus madagascariensis in 1955, a mostly comoplete skeleton that included a complete forelimb. The forelimb of the specimen was described further in 2007 by Läng and Goussard.

In an unpublished thesis, A. Ogier described abundant material of juvenile specimens from Madagascar that he identified as Bothriospondylus. In 1986, José Fernando Bonaparte considered the Malagasy material to not belong to Bothriospondylus and erected the new genus and species Lapparentosaurus madagascariensis based on Ogier's specimens, which he considered distinct.

Bothriospondylus madagascariensis is now considered a nomen dubium, and the specimens it was based on are considered to be Eusauropoda incertae sedis. The scapula and coracoid included in B. madagascariensis by Lydekker each exhibit potential autapomorphies, a prominent ridge on the scapula and a prominent rugosity on the coracoid, but the uncertain association of the specimens with the holotype dorsal vertebra of B. madagascariensis and fragmentary condition of the remains prevents naming a new genus based on these characteristics.
