= Age determination in dinosaurs =

Estimating approximate age of death

Age determination in dinosaurs is primarily done through histological analyses to observe the cyclical growth marks in the bone, and by observing the level of bone fusion in the skeleton. In this way, it is possible to determine the approximate ontogenetic age of a dinosaur when the animal died.

== History ==
Early attempts to estimate the longevity of dinosaurs used allometric scaling principles. Ages were determined by dividing individual mass estimates by rates of growth for similar, extant taxa. For very large individuals, growth rates were extrapolated to dinosaur proportions using regression analysis. The results of these investigations have been extremely variable as they depend on mass estimates and growth rates that are highly at odds with one another. For example, using this method resulted in longevity estimates for the sauropod Hypselosaurus priscus that ranged from a few decades to several hundred years.

However, it was later shown that most dinosaur bones have growth lines that are visible in thin-sectioned material viewed under a polarized light source.

== Growth lines ==
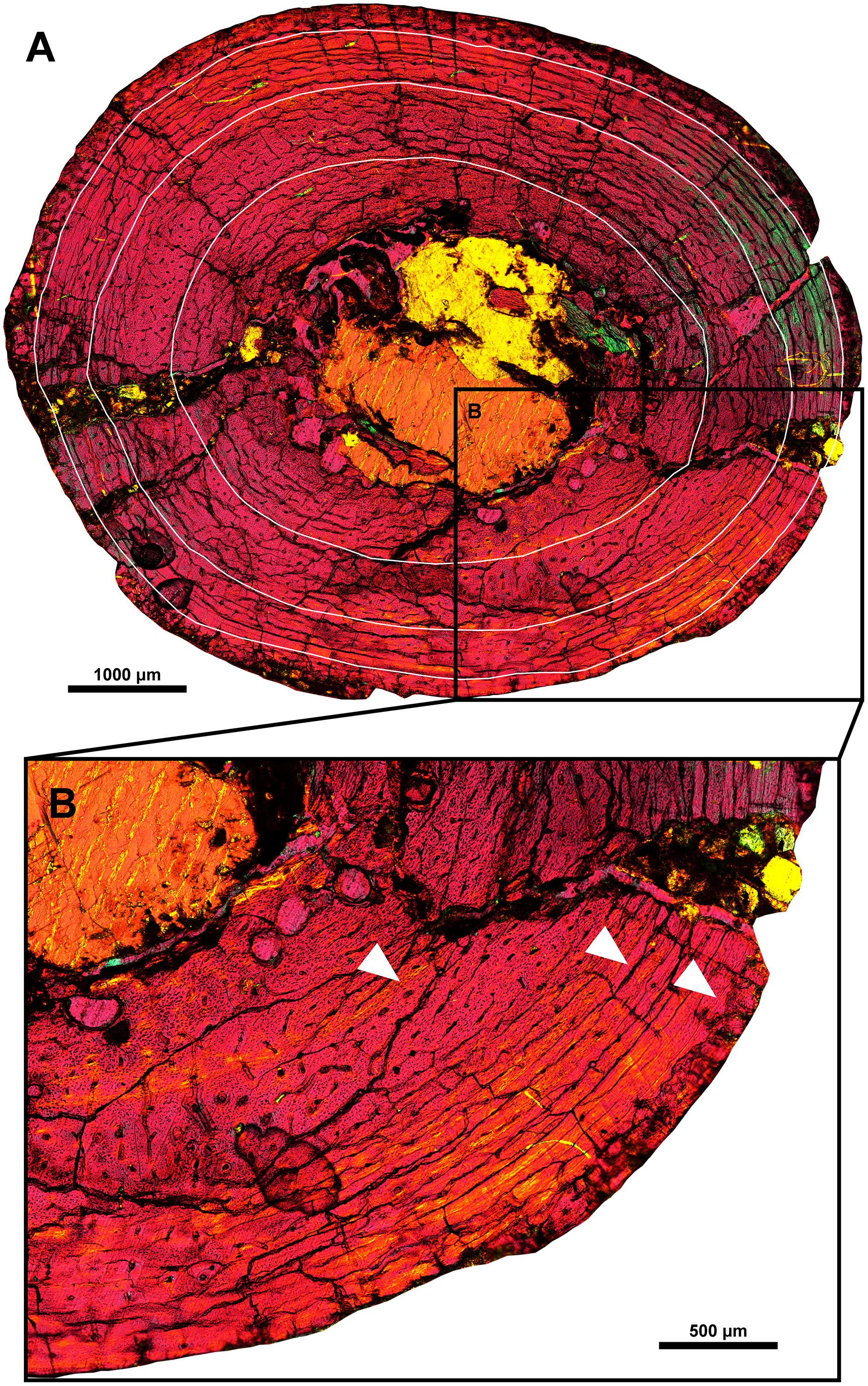
Humerus cross-section of a 3-year old Yamaceratops dorngobiensis. Three LAGs are marked with white lines (A) and white arrowheads (B).

Studies on extant vertebrates indicate that the vascularized zones form during moderate to rapid skeletogenesis, and that abrupt metabolic disruptions of bone formation can trigger growth line deposition.

Two types of growth lines exist: annuli, and lines of arrested growth (LAGs). Histological examinations have revealed that annuli are composed of thin layers of avascular bone with parallel-aligned bone fibers. The growth line annuli are found compressed between broad vascularized regions of bone with randomly oriented fibrillar patterns, known as zones.

=== Lines of arrested growth (LAGs) ===
Lines of arrested growth, similar to annuli, are found between zones that are avascular. They are, however, much thinner and have relatively fewer bone fibers by volume. When modern animals deposit LAGs, one LAG is typically deposited annually, caused by the slowing or absence of growth during the harshest seasons of the year. As a result, each LAG is typically interpreted as a representation of a year of growth. It is suggested that in modern animals, annuli and LAGs may be deposited in synchrony with endogenous biorhythms. For example, one study claims that captive crocodilians exposed to constant temperature, diet, and photoperiod still exhibit the periodic and cyclical skeletal growth banding of their wild counterparts. However, during a later study of a 3 year old captive American alligator raised inside a fish hatchery with a constant temperature and supply of food, no LAGs were observed in its bones.

However, the total number of observed LAGs is not directly reflective of an individual animal's age. Two LAGs may sometimes occur when extremely close to each other. Such are referred to as "double LAGs" and interpreted as a representation of one year of growth instead of two. Cases where multiple LAGs are in close proximity to each other are referred to as multi-LAG or multiple growth mark complexes. They are also known as "split LAGs". The presence of double and multi-LAG complexes can frustrate the counting of growth marks. In addition, resorption of internal and external bone proceeds even as new cortical bone continues to be deposited, so that growth lines deposited early in development may need to be inferred from the width of such remodelled bone, and the width between any LAGs that are preserved. This is referred to as "retrocalculation". For example, retrocalculation models estimate that tyrannosaurids have 4-10 missing LAGs in femorae and tibiae.

Larger appendicular elements like the tibia are weight-bearing, and as such are likely more reflective of overall growth patterns, depositing layers of new bone at rates different from that of non-weight bearing elements. However, non-weight bearing elements such as the fibula are less affected by the expansion of the medullary cavity, which destroys the innermost LAGs. Consequently, fibulas often exhibit more LAGs than femurs and tibias.

== Maturity ==
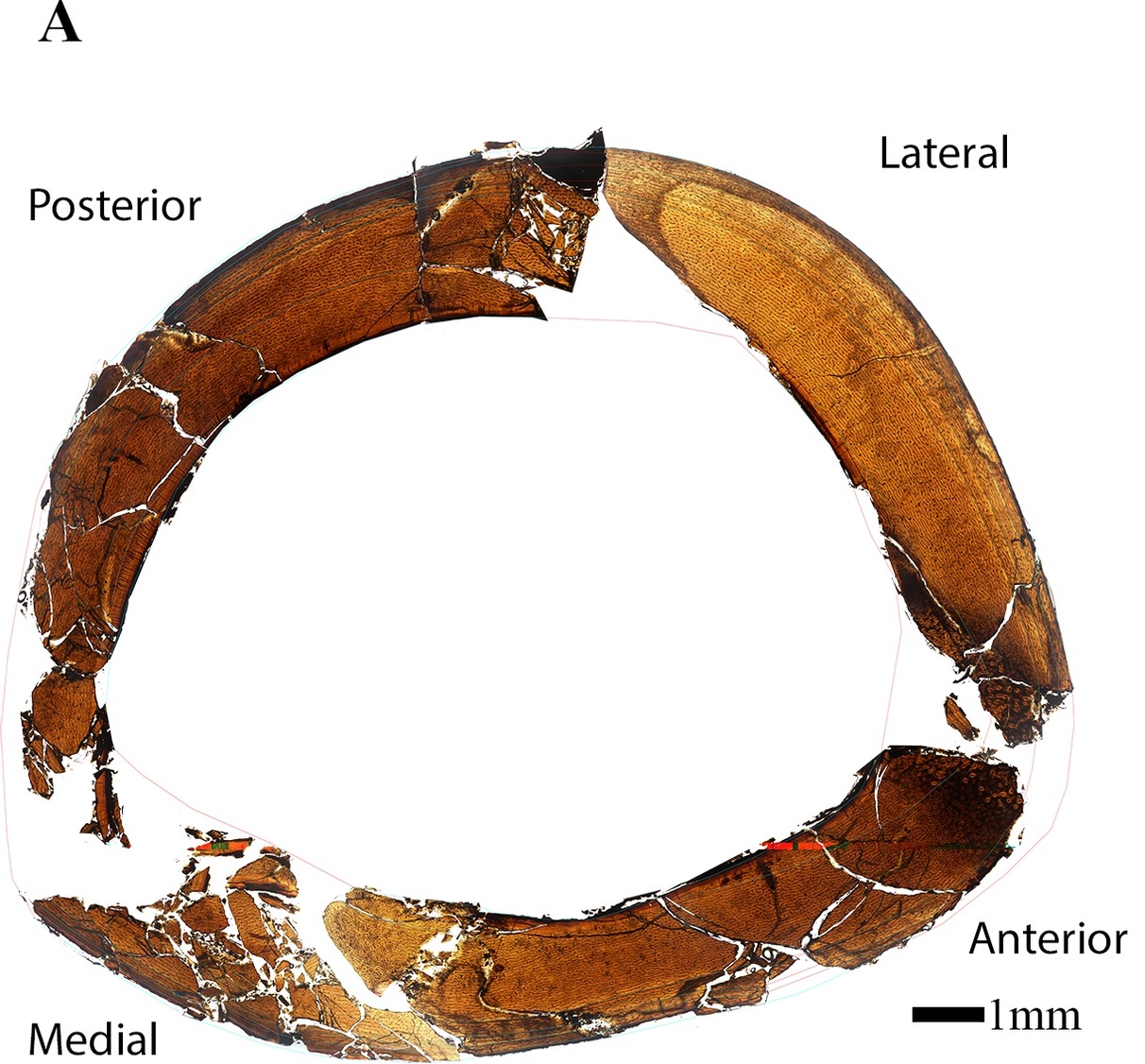
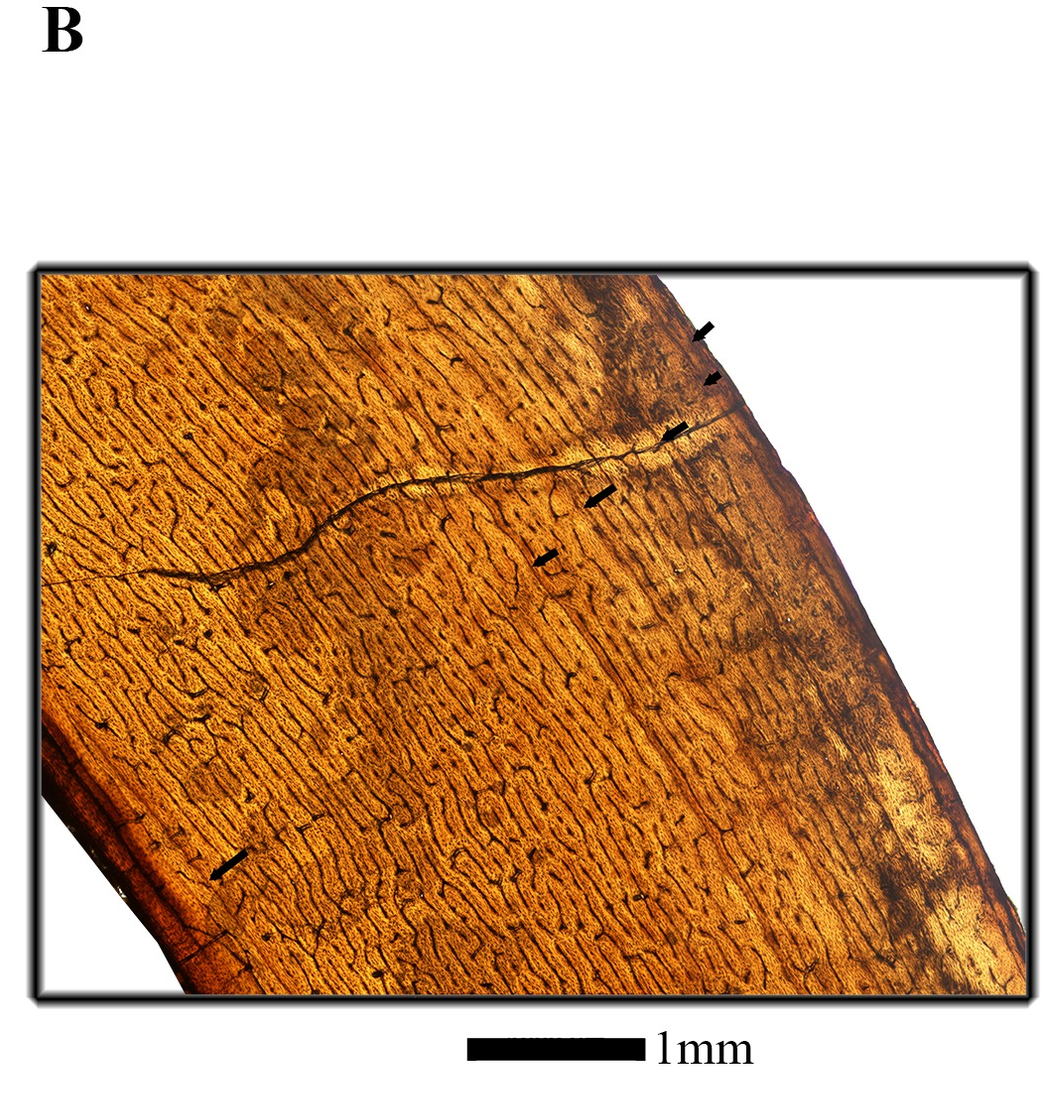
Femur cross section of a 6-year old Eoneophron infernalis in plain polarized light. A) LAGs traced in light blue; B) Close up with arrows denoting LAGs. Vascularity is shown to decrease from the inner to outer cortex, i.e., as the animal matures

Within academic studies, the meaning of terms such as "adult", "subadult", "juvenile", etc., can be ambiguous, and their meaning may differ between different studies. For instance, some authors consider animals to have reached adulthood upon reaching sexual maturity, while others only consider skeletally mature animals as adults. In addition, what one author considers "subadult" may be considered "juvenile" by another. As a result, the practice of using such terms has been discouraged, as well as references to "somatic" maturity, in favour of referring to specimens' "skeletal" maturity.

=== Skeletal maturity ===
A common indicator of skeletal maturity and somatic maturity in dinosaurs is the presence of an external fundamental system (EFS). An EFS is a grouping of closely spaced LAGs in the outermost cortex, caused by the animal's relatively slow growth as it approaches final size. It is often accompanied by a loss of vascularity; another indicator of skeletal and somatic maturity is the presence of an outer circumferential layer (OCL), which is avascular bone composed of slowly deposited parallel-fibered bone.

The approximate degree of skeletal maturity that an animal has reached can also be inferred from the degree of fusion or co-ossification of bones.

=== Sexual maturity ===
Sexual maturity is inferred when intrinsic fibres of the bone become much more well-organized, which may be accompanied by the slowing of growth of the animal. It may also be inferred when putative sociosexual structures become well developed, such as the cranial domes of pachycephalosaurs. As a result, there are two abrupt decreases in growth rate across a dinosaur's lifespan: the first when it reaches sexual maturity, and the second when it reaches skeletal and somatic maturity.

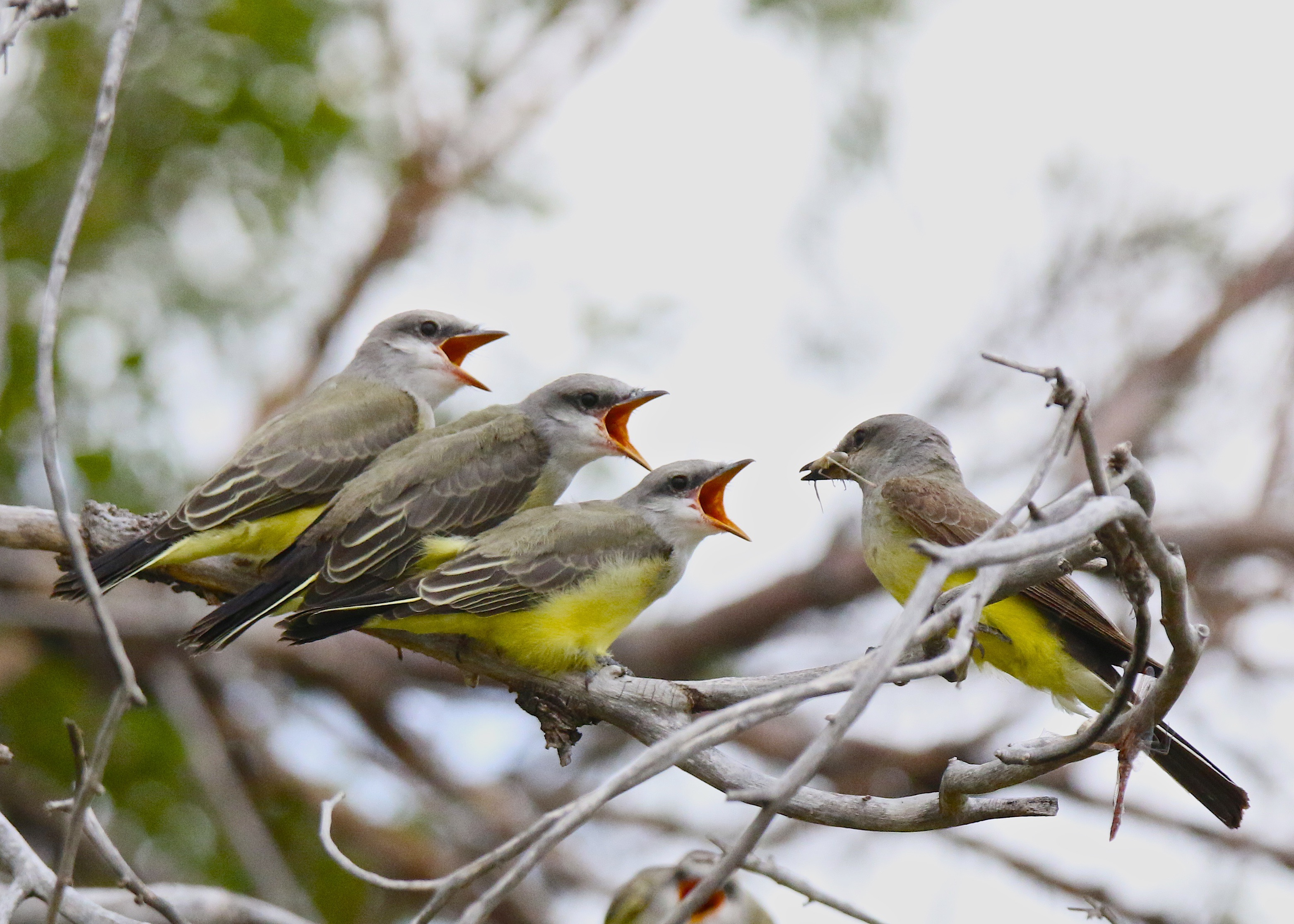
Unlike most other amniotes, most modern birds (such as these western kingbirds) only become sexually mature well after growing to maximum size

=== Comparison to birds ===
Sexual maturity typically precedes skeletal maturity in non-avian dinosaurs and indeed most amniotes to varying degrees. In contrast, most modern birds (ornithurans) experience an intense growth spurt early in life, and reach sexual maturity well after growing to maximum size, with kiwis as an exception. In 2019, the Early Cretaceous enanthiornithine bird Avimaia was found gravid with an unlaid egg despite not having reached skeletal maturity, indicating that non-ornithuran birds still attained sexual maturity before skeletal maturity.

With the exception of at least some species of flightless palaeognaths, all modern birds reach skeletal maturity within their first year of life, contrasting with non-avian dinosaurs.

== Longevity ==
The data resulting from pioneering efforts to age dinosaur fossils using growth ring counts is used in conjunction with mass estimates in order to infer the metabolic status and growth rates of dinosaurs.

It has been reported that chasmosaurines do not preserve LAGs, unlike other ceratopsians, making age determination of the group difficult. This is because chasmosaurines exhibit a continuous and uninterrupted growth pattern, which does not produce LAGs in the bone. In contrast, early-diverging neoceratopsians and centrosaurines exhibit cyclic, interrupted growth patterns, which result in the presence of LAGs. Unpublished histological studies of Utahceratops and Kosmoceratops appear to dispute the absence of LAGs in chasmosaurines. Some, such as Triceratops, do preserve LAGs, but only LAGs from later stages of life, obstructing age determination.

Age estimation of mature titanosaurs is difficult. Intense secondary remodelling of the bone occurs after titanosaurs reach sexual maturity, obstructing LAGs. Similar high levels of remodelling is also seen in the euhelopodid Phuwiangosaurus. The Javelina Formation titanosaur specimen TMM 41541-1 from the Maastrichtian may be referable to Alamosaurus, although this pends the full description of the specimen. Up to 12 LAGs could be observed in the dorsal ribs, but the true age of the animal is still obfuscated by the secondary bone remodelling that is characteristic of titanosaurs. The presence of an EFS in only the posterior ribs suggests that growth did not stop at the same time in all parts of the skeleton.

In 2026, histology of Tyrannosaurus rex specimens revealed, in over half of the studied specimens, the presence of growth marks that only became visible when viewed under cross-polarized light (XPL). While there is some evidence to support the assumption that these growth marks are also annual, confirmation requires further investigation of their presence in other specimens and taxa.

Ornithischians
Species	Estimated age of the oldest measured specimen	Specimen #	Notes
Liaoningosaurus paradoxus	< 1 year	IVPP V 20798	The largest known Liaoningosaurus specimen. It was nonetheless a juvenile under a year old, based on the absence of any LAGs, EFS, or secondary osteons.
Manidens condorensis	< 1 year	MPEF-PV 3211 (holotype)	Under a year old, considered a late juvenile or subadult.
Zavacephale rinpoche	2+ years	MPC-D 100/1209 (holotype)	Skeletally immature, with no EFS. Age estimate is based on the presence of 2 "cyclical growth marks". The cranial dome is well-developed, such that if the hypothesis that the cranial dome in pachycephalosaurs is a sociosexual structure is correct, implies that the animal had reached sexual maturity.
Yamaceratops dorngobiensis	3 years	MPC-D 100/553	Juvenile with 3 preserved LAGs, showing very little bone remodelling.
Liaoceratops yanzigouensis	3+ years	IVPP V17910	A subadult.
Psittacosaurus sibiricus	4+ years	KOKM 4652/1	A subadult that was at least 4 years old. Larger specimens were histologically sampled, but no growth marks were observed in them.
Lesothosaurus diagnosticus	6 years		Several skeletally immature elements from a bonebed.
Psittacosaurus mongoliensis	9 years	PIN 698/1977	One of the largest known Psittacosaurus specimens. However, it likely could've grown noticeably larger as its growth rate had not yet plateaued.
Psittacosaurus lujiatunensis	11 years	ZMNH M8138	Although sexually mature, it likely could've grown noticeably larger as its growth rate had not yet plateaued.
Yinlong downsi	10+ years	IVPP V18637	An adult. 10 lines of arrested growth (LAG) are visible, but partial erasure of the innermost LAGs prevents precise age estimation.
Laquintasaura venezuelae	10-12 years	MBLUZ P.5012	Scapula fragment of a skeletally mature adult, with a minimum estimated age of 10-12 years, showing an EFS.
Cerasinops hodgskissi	11 years	MOR 300 (holotype)	A "relatively mature" individual that was still slowly growing when it died at an estimated maximum age of 11 years.
Einiosaurus procurvicornis	6 years		The oldest known Einiosaurus specimens were all just 6 years old at the time of death. None of them were fully grown adult, although they were sexually mature.
Pachyrhinosaurus sp.	19 years	UAMES 3551	A large femur from the Prince Creek Formation. The animal was still actively growing at the time of death.
Hypacrosaurus stebingeri	13 years	MOR 549	An adult with an EFS. Sexual maturity occurred at 2-3 years of age.
Probrachylophosaurus bergei	14 years	MOR 2919 (holotype)	The specimen's growth rate had slowed, but lacked an EFS. It was not yet skeletally mature, although it was close to being so. It probably became sexually mature at 5 years old.
Dryosaurus altus	≤ 15 years	CM 1949	A femur lacking an EFS. The specimen only preserved LAGs at the outside perimeter of the bone. Estimation of the full number of LAGS that were originally present was done by comparing it to ontogenetically much younger specimens that preserved LAGs close to the bone cortex.
Maiasaura peeblesorum	15 years		An adult.
Edmontosaurus annectens	18+ years	ROM 73853	An adult whose growth rate was beginning to plateau.
Dysalotosaurus lettowvorbecki	20 years		An adult. Out of several bone beds, this specimen's femur was the largest recovered.
Miragaia longicollum	25 years	ML 433 (holotype)	A skeletally mature adult, based on the presence of an EFS. Skeletal maturity occurred at 21-22 years of age. Sexual maturity occurred at 14-15 years of age.
Draconyx loureiroi	31 years	ML 439 (holotype)	A fully grown adult, based on the presence of an EFS. Sexual maturity occurred at 12-17 years of age.

Sauropodomorphs
Species	Estimated age of the oldest measured specimen	Specimen #	Notes
Nyana rooiwalensis	3+ years	BP/1/8468 (holotype)	Juvenile that was at least in its third year of growth.
Bicharracosaurus dionidei	7+ years	MPEF-PV 1730 (holotype)	The presence of at least 7 cyclical growth marks (CGMs) suggest a minimum age of seven years. It was likely somatically/skeletally mature as the dorsal ribs show an EFS, which is supported by the level of bone fusion.
Musango matusadonaensis	8+ years	NHMZ 2583 (holotype)	Late sub-adult or adult exhibiting slowing growth rate.
Amargasaurus cazaui	10+ years	MACN PV N15 (holotype)	The specimen was sexually mature. Despite the absence of an EFS, it is unknown if it had reached somatic maturity, as the bones experienced erosion that could've destroyed an EFS.
Lirainosaurus astibiae	11+ years	MGUV 17166	A humerus from what was considered a young adult. It had reached 69% of the body size of the largest known Lirainosaurus specimens (although such specimens were likely still actively growing due to lack of an EFS). Obstruction of LAGs from intense secondary remodelling of bone occurs as this species approaches maturity, making age estimation difficult. A degree of remodelling is even seen in this relatively young specimen, and is typical of titanosaurs.
Tuebingosaurus maierfritzorum	15 years	GPIT-PV-30787 (holotype)	12 LAGs visible in the left femur, but total number of LAGs was estimated to be 15. Osteohistology was conducted when it was still thought to be a specimen of Plateosaurus engelhardti and referred to as 'IFG compactus'; the study noted that the bone tissue was unusual for a Plateosaurus specimen. It was eventually described as a different species with a faster growth rate than Plateosaurus. An adult.
Massospondylus carinatus	20+ years		Several specimens have been estimated to be 20 years old at a minimum. None of them reached skeletal maturity, as they all lack an EFS in the long bones, but growth rate had slowed to the point where they were very close to having reached maximum size.
Amargatitanis macni	19+ years	MACN PV N53 (holotype)	A somatically and skeletally mature adult, based on the presence of an EFS containing 6 LAGs.
Ardetosaurus viator	22 years	MAB011899 (holotype)	Nicknamed "Brösmeli", this individual was an adult. It reached sexual maturity at 13 years old and skeletal maturity at 17 years old.
Plateosaurus engelhardti	26-27 years	IFG uncatalogued, NAA A 9	The IFG specimen is estimated to have been 10 metres long, the maximum documented size in Plateosaurus. It had already reached skeletal maturity several years before death. The animals of the bonebed it was from are presumed to have died by accident, so it is assumed that it had not reached the maximum lifespan of the species. The NAA specimen reached a similar age, but belonged to an individual only 6.5 metres long.
Apatosaurus sp.	30+ years	BYU 601-17328, SMA 0014	SMA 0014 was at least 30 years old at the time of death, having reached an estimated 91% of its maximum size.
Mamenchisaurid indet.	26-31 (45?) years	SGP 2006/9	The Giant's Tomb mamenchisaurid consisted of a right humerus and left ulna. This massive individual represented the largest known mamenchisaurid when described in 2011. Histological analyses place it at 26-31 years old at death, while conflicting data from body mass growth models suggest it was around 45 years old.
Mussaurus patagonicus	29-34 years	MLP 68-II-27-1	A subadult that reached sexual maturity 3-6 years before death. The age estimate is tentative, as it is difficult to account for the number of cyclical growth marks (CGM) destroyed during growth. Much older, even "senile" specimens are known, but none are well preserved enough for an age estimation.
Janenschia robusta	38 years	NHUB Nr. 22	An adult. The initial study using growth rings posited it may have actually been 39 years old at death, as bone remodelling may have obliterated one growth line. Sexual maturity was reached at 11 years of age. A later study calculating the rate of bone apposition yielded much lower estimates of the age at death.
Camarasaurus sp.	40 years	SMA 0002	This nearly complete specimen is also known as "E.T." and reached adult size at 34 years old, despite being unusually small for a Camarasaurus. The specimen is nearly complete, and is geologically the oldest Camarasaurus specimen in the Morrison Formation.
Lapparentosaurus	43 years		
Narindasaurus	43 years		
Diplodocus carnegii	34 years	CM 94 (paratype)	Skeletally mature at a maximum estimated age of 34 years. It may have been at the same stage in life as the D. hallorum holotype, despite being younger in age, as they shared similar bone tissue composition.
Diplodocus hallorum	60 years	NMMNH P-25079 (holotype)	The holotype of D. hallorum (formerly Seismosaurus) had only 'recently' reached skeletal maturity before dying at a maximum estimated age of 60 years.
Supersaurus vivianae	Unknown	WDC DMJ-021	Also known as "Jimbo", this specimen is considered to be the oldest known dinosaur. However, its exact age is unknown, as extensive remodelling of the bone due to age had obscured most of the lines of arrested growth.

Non-avian theropods
Species	Estimated age of the oldest measured specimen	Specimen #	Notes
Wulong bohaiensis	1 year	DNHM D2933 (holotype)	A juvenile.
Sinornithosaurus “haoiana”	1 year	DNHM D2140	Significantly more mature than Wulong's holotype despite being of similar age, but still actively growing as it lacked an EFS.
Shuvuuia deserti	2 years	MGI 100/975	A juvenile.
Raptorex kriegsteini	2-3 years	LH PV18 (holotype)	A juvenile tyrannosaurid of controversial affinities. It is disputed whether it belongs to its own genus or is an immature Tarbosaurus. It was originally considered to be 5-6 years old, but this was challenged by a later histological study.
Mei long	2-4+ years	DNHM D2154	An adult whose growth had mostly stopped, and there is a structure that resembles an EFS.
Albinykus baatar	3 years	MAE PSS 04-18 (holotype)	An adult.
Similicaudipteryx yixianensis	3 years	PMoL AD000113	Based on LAGs from the fibula after assuming a LAG was lost to erosion.
Aniksosaurus darwini	3+ years		Two specimens were found to have been at least 3 years old at death, and are considered juveniles or subadults due to the absence of an OCL.
Kiyacursor longipes	3+ years	KOKM 5542 (holotype)	A subadult individual that lacks an EFS.
Norellraptor barsboldi	3+ years	130108-MHGU-F4281 (holotype)	A late juvenile that died early after the latest cessation of growth, at the very beginning of its last year of life.
Berthasaura leopoldinae	3-4 years	MN-7821-V (holotype)	Subadult that did not yet reach sexual maturity.
Tianyuraptor ostromi	4 years	PMoL AD000115	Based on LAGs from the fibula after assuming a LAG was lost to erosion.
Haplocheirus sollers	4 years	IVPP V15988 (holotype)	A juvenile.
Daliansaurus liaoningensis	4 years	DNHM D2885 (holotype)	A subadult that was close to adulthood.
Liaoningvenator curriei	4+ years	DNHM D3012 (holotype)	Lacks an EFS and was still growing, but was close to skeletal maturity.
Sinovenator changii	4+ years	SDUST-V1062	Close to maximum somatic size, based on the presence of an EFS. 4 LAGs observable.
Talos sampsoni	4-6 years	UMNH VP 19479 (holotype)	An immature specimen lacking an EFS. Growth was beginning to slow down.
Changyuraptor yangi	5+ years	HG B016 (holotype)	An adult at least in its fifth year of life.
Oksoko avarsan	5+ years	MPC-D 102/12	Femur shows 5 LAGs, but was probably more than 5 years old because earlier growth lines are likely obliterated by the expanding medullary cavity.
Troodontidae nov. sp.	6 years	IGM 100/1129	Also known as MPC-D 100/1129. A new species of small-bodied troodontid from upper Cretaceous Mongolia, that is yet to be described as of 2025. Although skeletally immature and lacking an EFS, it was found brooding a clutch of eggs.
Eoneophron infernalis	6 years	CM 96523 (holotype)	Close to, if not already, skeletally mature.
Citipes elegans	6+ years	UALVP 59606	Near maximum size, at least 6 LAGs observable in metatarsal IV, some growth lanes were probably obfuscated by expansion of the medullary cavity.
Koleken inakayali	6+ years	MPEF-PV 10826	An immature individual that had not yet reached sexual maturity.
Infernogallus jamesi	6+ years	ROM VP 65050 (holotype)	Minimum age estimate is 6 but more likely 7 years of age, based on LAGs. It was skeletally mature and had an EFS formed by the last 4 LAGs.
Moros intrepidus	6-7 years	NCSM 33392 (holotype)	A subadult.
Megapnosaurus rhodesiensis	7 years		
Bannykus wulatensis	8 years	IVPP V25026 (holotype)	An adult.
Sinornithomimus dongi	8 years	IVPP V11797-10 (holotype)	Not skeletally mature, lacking an EFS in the femur. However, possibly sexually mature.
Oviraptor philoceratops	8 years	AMNH FARB 6517 (holotype)	Was brooding a clutch of eggs when it died; however, it lacked an EFS and was still actively growing.
Corythoraptor jacobsi	8+ years	JPM-2015-001 (holotype)	Was still growing at time of death, having not yet reached maximum size. Considered a young adult. Died at the beginning of a new growth season.
cf. Anzu wyliei	8+ years	ROM VP 65884	A partial skeleton of what is likely an Anzu wyliei, as it was from the Hell Creek Formation. The individual was at least 8 years old and actively growing when it died, and would've been approximately the same size as the A. wyliei holotype.
Rativates evadens	8+ years	ROM 1790 (holotype)	A subadult or adult, near or at the onset of somatic maturity.
Elemgasem nubilus	8+ years	MCF-PVPH-380 (holotype)	Sexually mature but not yet somatically mature, as it was still growing and lacked an EFS.
Xiyunykus pengi	9 years	IVPP V22783 (holotype)	A subadult.
Shishugounykus inexpectus	9 years	IVPP V23567 (holotype)	An adult.
Niebla antiqua	9+ years	MPCN-PV-796 (holotype)	An adult that had reached somatic maturity based on the presence of an EFS.
Chirostenotes pergracilis	9+ years	UALVP 59400	A partial skeleton that was at least 9 years old at the time of death. Growth had considerably slowed by this time, and the individual was approaching its maximum body size.
Wiehenvenator albati	9+ years	(holotype)	Considered a subadult, as it lacked an EFS despite its growth rate slowing down. Although 9 years is the estimated minimum age at death, the specimen may have been well over 10 years old, as intense secondary remodelling of the bone could have obstructed some LAGs.
Limusaurus inextricabilis	10 years	IVPP 20099	An adult with an EFS who attained somatic maturity at 6 years old.
Xixianykus zhangi	11 years	XMDFEC V0011 (holotype)	An adult.
Ceratosaurus magnicornis	11+ years	MWC 1	One of the largest known Ceratosaurus specimens, but not the largest. It is the holotype of C. magnicornis, although the validity of the species is disputed. Unfused sutures in the skull indicate it had not yet reached adult size.
Aucasaurus garridoi	11+ years	MCF-PVPH-236 (holotype)	An adult.
Masiakasaurus knopfleri	12 years	FMNH PR 2123	Multiple models were used to create age estimates of the specimen. The most reliable model, as judged by the study team, yielded an age of 12 years at the time of death. The growth rate of the animal had plateaued, and it had reached maximum size.
Guanlong wucaii	12 years	IVPP V14531 (holotype)	An adult that had reached full size by the time it was 7 years old.
Anteavis crurilongus	12+ years	PVSJ 1085 (holotype)	The presence of an EFS was interpreted as an indication of somatic maturity. The degree of skeletal fusion indicates that it was at least a young adult close to skeletal maturity. Around 16 LAGs can be observed in the dorsal ribs; the lamellar condition of the bone tissue prevents a precise count. LAGs from early in life may have also been obstructed.
Caenagnathus collinsi	12+ years	UALVP 56638	Histology of pubic bones show it was at least 12 years old and approaching maximum size. Considered skeletally mature.
Citipati osmolskae	13 years	IGM 100/979, IGM 100/1004	Both specimens were found brooding a clutch of eggs.
Vespersaurus paranaensis	13 years	CP.V 2385	An adult with an EFS.
Asiatyrannus xui	13+ years	ZMNH M30360 (holotype)	Initially interpreted as a subadult that was approaching somatic maturity, it has more recently been argued to be more immature than was initially concluded.
Deinonychus antirrhopus	13-14 years	AMNH 3015	The specimen is closely associated with an egg, which was positioned under its belly.
Cryolophosaurus ellioti	14 years	FMNH PR 1821 (holotype)	Based on LAGs from the dorsal rib, after estimating the number of missing lags through retrocalculation. The degree of skeletal fusion suggests it was not fully mature, possible a subadult.
Nanotyrannus lancensis	14+ years	NCSM 40000	Nicknamed "Bloody Mary", the specimen shows the beginnings of an EFS and was close to somatic maturity, but skeletal growth had not fully stopped.
Lourinhanosaurus antunesi	14-17 years	ML 370 (holotype)	A skeletally immature individual. It is unknown if it reached sexual maturity.
Alpkarakush kyrgyzicus	17+ years	IGB 2/33 (holotype)	The specimen has a minimum estimated age of 17 years, but is most likely older. It was a subadult that was close to fully grown, yet still slowly growing based on the absence of an EFS.
Troodon formosus	18 years	MOR 748	An adult brooding a clutch of eggs. It had reached full adult size and had an EFS. The validity of the genus Troodon is currently controversial. However, MOR 748 was found in the same area as the proposed Troodon neotype.
Oviraptorinae indet.	18 years	IVPP V9608	A skeletally mature adult with an EFS was found brooding a clutch of eggs. This partially complete specimen from Bayan Mandahu was initially tentatively referred to Oviraptor philoceratops, but this is now disputed.
Saurornitholestes	19 years		Based on lines of arrested growth.
Joaquinraptor casali	19+ years	UNPSJB-PV 1112 (holotype)	Sexually mature based on the reduction in spacing of LAGs. Its somatic maturity is uncertain, but is noted to lack an EFS.
Acrocanthosaurus atokensis	21+ years	OMNH 10146 (holotype)	Skeletally mature based on the presence of an EFS.
Gorgosaurus libratus	22 years		
Iberospinus natarioi	23-25 years	ML 1190 (holotype)	The specimen died near the onset of skeletal maturity. Sexual maturity occurred at 13-15 years of age.
Saltriovenator zanellai	24+ years	MSNM V3664 (holotype)	A subadult close to the onset of somatic maturity, based on the presence of an incipient EFS.
Daspletosaurus torosus	26 years		
Albertosaurus sarcophagus	28 years	TMP 2004.56.48	Excavated from the Dry Island Albertosaurus bonebed, this specimen has an estimated body length of 10.1 metres.
Allosaurus fragilis	22-28 years	AMNH 680, MHNG GEPI V2567b	AMNH 680 is the largest definitive Allosaurus specimen, with an estimated length of 9.7 metres. It has been referred to A. fragilis. Histology of the femur and tibia yielded age estimations of 22 and 28 years, respectively. There is no presence of an EFS. MHNG GEPI V2567 is a composite skeleton likely representing multiple individuals. The individual represented by the tibia was around 26 years old at time of death, having reached skeletal maturity at least 5 years prior, when it developed an EFS.
Tyrannosaurus rex	30+ years	FMNH PR 2081, RGM 792.000	Specimen FMNH PR 2081 (Sue) is estimated to have been 27-33 years old at death. RGM 792.000 (Trix) is also estimated to have reached over 30 years of age, but no formal literature has been published on this as of 2025. The species may have been able to attain longer lifespans; a 2026 histological study of 17 specimens estimated that growth would only plateau at 35-40 years. Bone core sampling methodology differed from that of previous studies, such as those done on FMNH PR 2081, which may have impacted the number of growth marks that could be observed.
Meraxes gigas	39-53 years	MMCh-PV 65 (holotype)	Reached skeletal maturity approximately 4 years before death.

== See also ==
- List of pathological dinosaur specimens
- Physiology of dinosaurs
