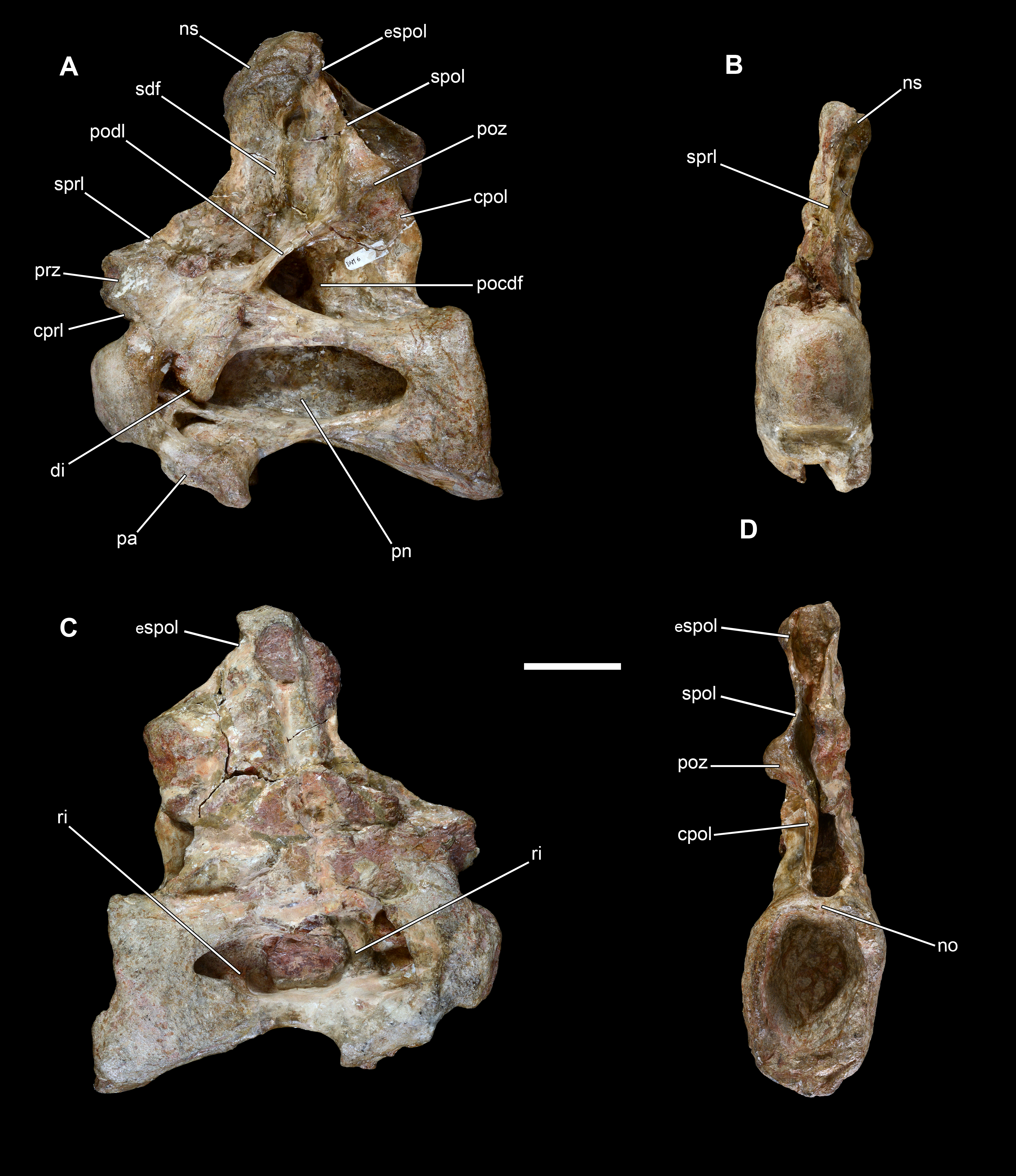
- Middle cervical vertebra

Scientific classification
- Kingdom: Animalia
- Phylum: Chordata
- Class: Reptilia
- Clade: Dinosauria
- Clade: Saurischia
- Clade: †Sauropodomorpha
- Clade: †Sauropoda
- Clade: †Macronaria
- Family: †Brachiosauridae
- Genus: †Vouivria; Mannion, Allain & Moine, 2017
- Species: †V. damparisensis

Binomial name
- †Vouivria damparisensis Mannion, Allain & Moine, 2017

= Vouivria =

Vouivria Temporal range: Late Jurassic (Oxfordian), 160 Ma

Extinct genus of dinosaurs

Vouivria is a genus of herbivorous sauropod dinosaur, belonging to the Brachiosauridae, that lived in the area of present France during the Late Jurassic. The type and only known species is Vouivria damparisensis. It is based on a specimen once commonly referred to as the "French Bothriospondylus" in the scientific literature, as the specimen was once identified as Bothriospondylus madagascariensis, a species known from the Middle Jurassic of Madagascar.

== History ==
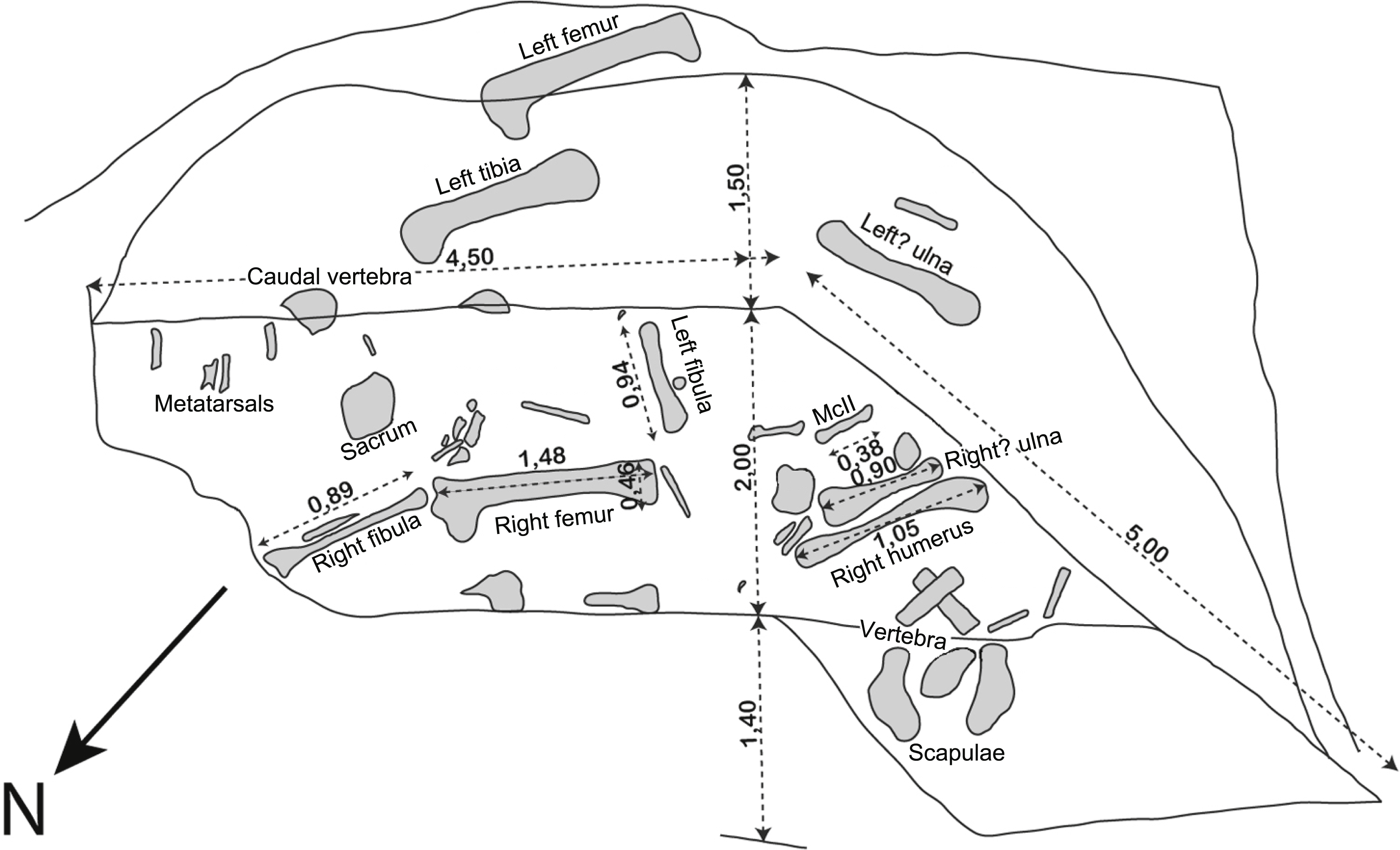
Original excavation plan

In 1926, the Solvay company began to exploit a chalkstone quarry at Belvoye, near Damparis in Franche-Comté. In April 1934, workers noticed the presence of large fossil bones in the southeastern face of the quarry. A scapula was shown to foreman Koehret who notified the company engineers Verhas and Chardin. They advised director Étienne Haerens to immediately excavate the marl lens containing the remains. Paleontologists Jean Piveteau and Raymond Ciry were asked to supervise this effort. The excavation started in May and was finished on 22 June 1934. The same year, baron Jean de Dorlodot published an article about the excavation process, considering most bones part of a single sauropod skeleton, washed into the sea by river flooding.

The company donated the bones to the Muséum national d'histoire naturelle at Paris where preparator Pansard partly freed them from the rock matrix. In 1939, Albert-Félix de Lapparent began to study them in detail, benefiting from further preparation by Pansard. In 1943, de Lapparent published a description referring the sauropod bones to Bothriospondylus madagascariensis, a species based on fragmentary remains from Madagascar. Seven theropod teeth found among the bones he referred to Megalosaurus insignis.

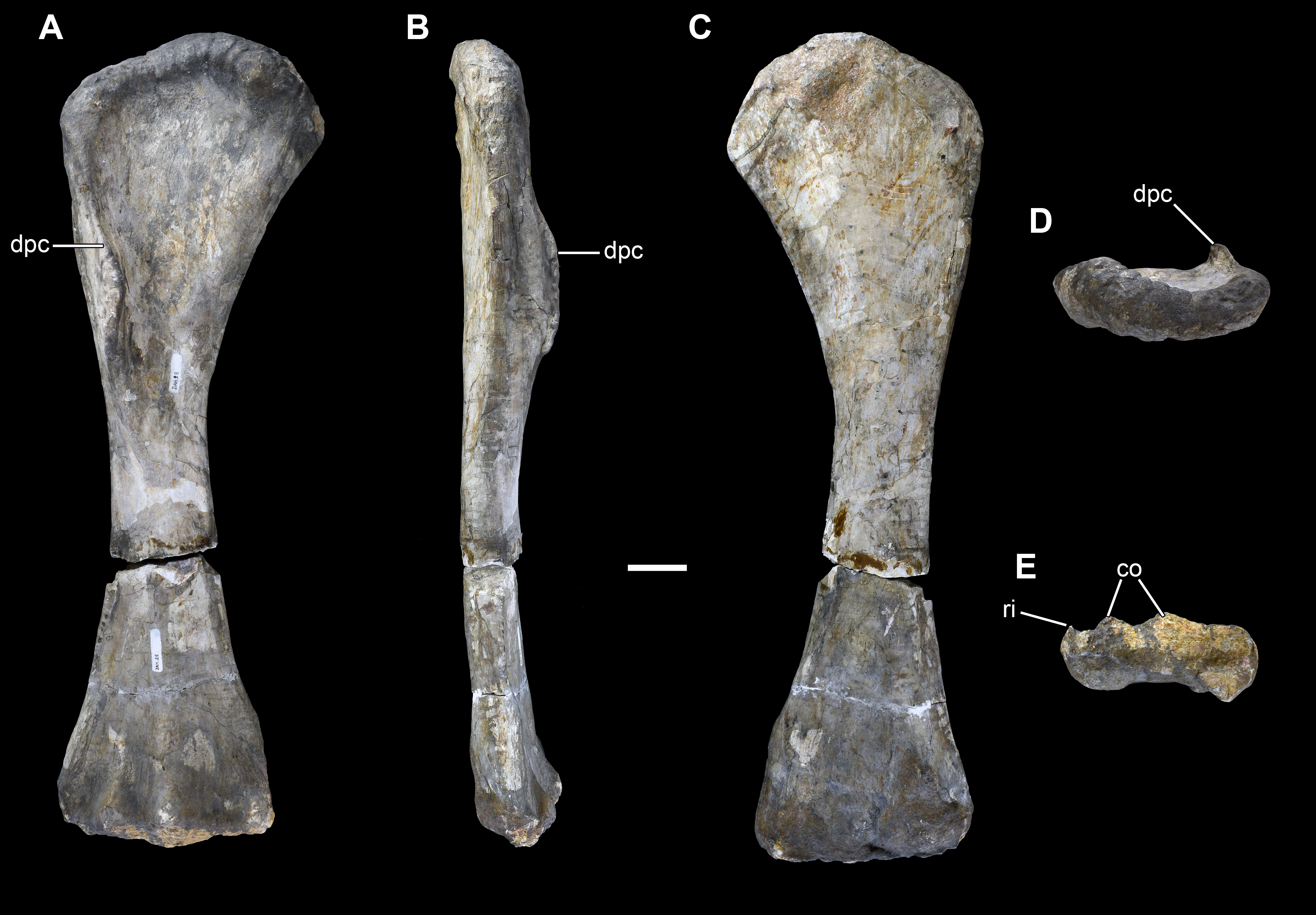
Humerus

By the 1980s, a consensus had developed that the skeleton had little to do with Bothriospondylus madagascariensis. It was referred to as the "French Bothriospondylus" or the "Damparis sauropod". As it was one of the most complete sauropod finds in France and of a considerable age, it was deemed important enough to be named as a separate taxon. In 2017, Philip D. Mannion, Ronan Allain and Olivier Moine named and described the type species Vouivria damparisensis. The generic name is a latinisation of French la vouivre — itself derived from Latin vipera, "adder" — a winged dragon or wyvern from local legend. French writer Marcel Aymé in 1941 dedicated a famous novel to this theme, La Vouivre, the creature taking the shape of a beautiful lady adorned with an enormous ruby. The specific name refers to the provenance at Damparis.

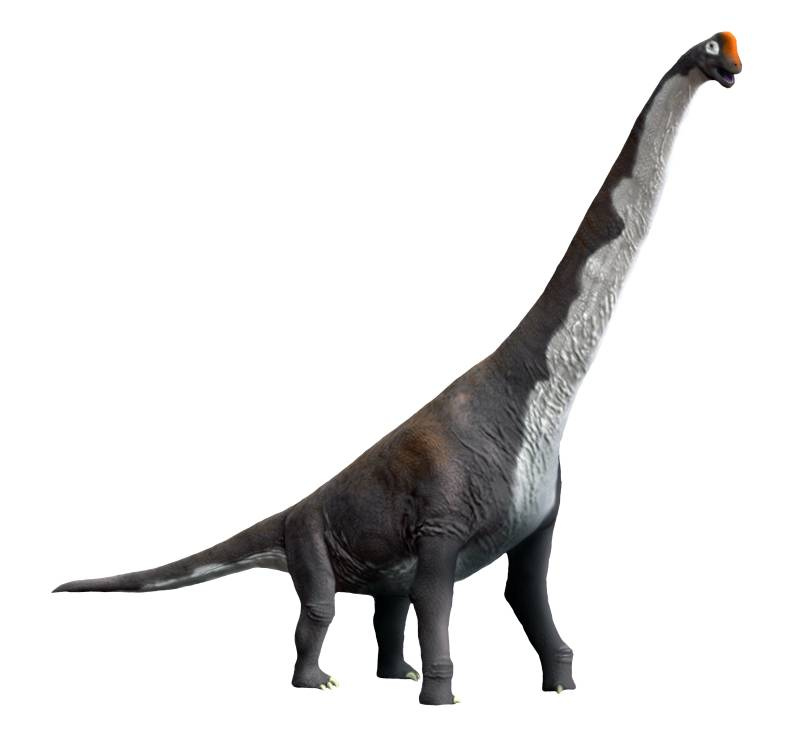
Life restoration

The holotype, MNHN.F.1934.6 DAM 1-42, was found in a layer of the Calcaires de Clerval Formation, possibly the Tidalites de Mouchard member dating from the middle to late Oxfordian. Its age is likely between 163.5 and 157.3 million years. It consists of a partial skeleton lacking the skull. It contains five teeth, three neck vertebrae, two back vertebrae, the first four vertebrae of the sacrum, a front tail vertebra, ribs, both shoulderblades, the right coracoid, the right humerus, both ulnae, a right carpal, the first, second and third right metacarpals, the first phalanges of the first to fourth left fingers, two possible hand claws, the left pelvis, the right ischium, both thighbones, both shinbones, both calfbones, a left astragalus, the first left metatarsal and the first, second and third right metatarsals. The bones were recovered from a surface area of about thirty square metres. They were not articulated but roughly located in their natural position. From this it was concluded in 2017 that the animal had died in situ near a coastal lagoon, its weight forming a lens in soft chalkstone, and after an exposure of several years during which it was scavenged by theropods, was covered by a new chalk layer which protected the bones after hardening.

== Description ==
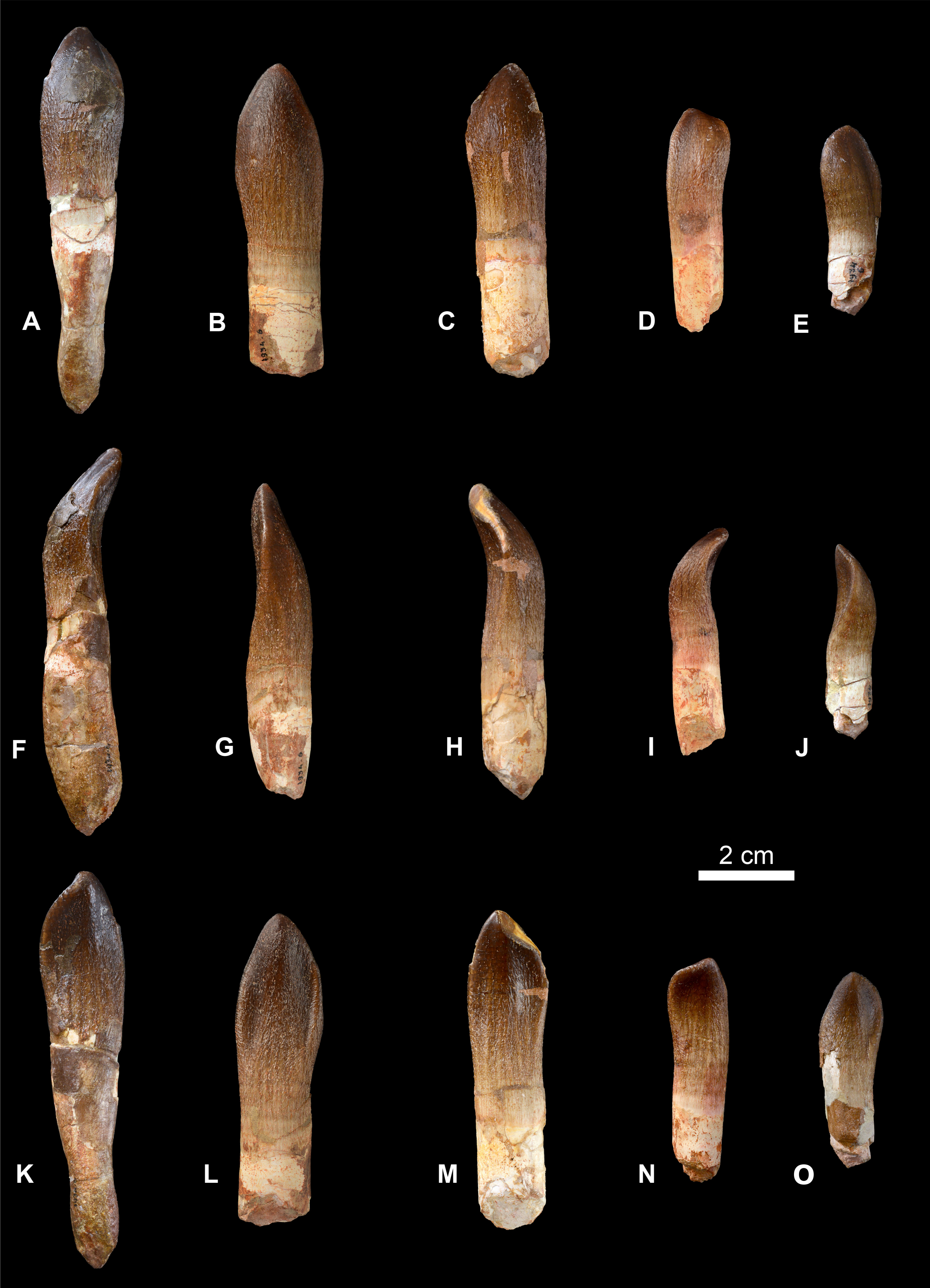
Teeth

The body length of Vouivria has been estimated at fifteen metres, its weight at fifteen tonnes. The thighbone length is 146 centimetres.

The describing authors identified a number of distinguishing traits, autapomorphies or unique derived characters. Four of these distinguished Vouivria from all other known sauropods. In the middle and rear neck vertebrae, the spinopostzygapophyseal laminae, or SPOLs, ridges that run from the rear joint processes to the neural spine, thicken towards the rear near the top of the spine. In the third metacarpal of the hand, the ridge that runs along the inner rear corner of the shaft, if the bone is held vertically, splits at about a quarter of the shaft length measured from the top, the outer branch having the form of a bulge. The fourth metacarpal has a flange along the top third of the inner rear corner. Between the lower condyles of the thighbone, two transverse ridges run, at the border with the rear shaft.

Also, two "local" autapomorphies were identified, that distinguished Vouvria from its nearest relatives in the Brachiosauridae. In the front tail vertebrae both the anterior centrodiapophyseal lamina (ACDL) and the posterior centrodiapophyseal lamina (PCDL), ridges that run on the front underside, respectively the rear underside, of the transverse process towards the vertebral body, are well-formed. The humerus or upper arm bone, has a deltopectoral crest, serving for the attachment of the deltoid muscle and the pectoralis major, that doubles in transverse width to below.

== Phylogeny ==
Already de Lapparent considered the specimen an exemplar of the Brachiosauridae. This was confirmed by a phylogenetic analysis in 2017, showing Vouivria to be a basal member of the Brachiosauridae, placed above Europasaurus and below Brachiosaurus altithorax in the evolutionary tree. If correct, this would make Vouivria the oldest known brachiosaurid and the oldest known member of the Titanosauriformes.

== See also ==
- 2017 in archosaur paleontology
