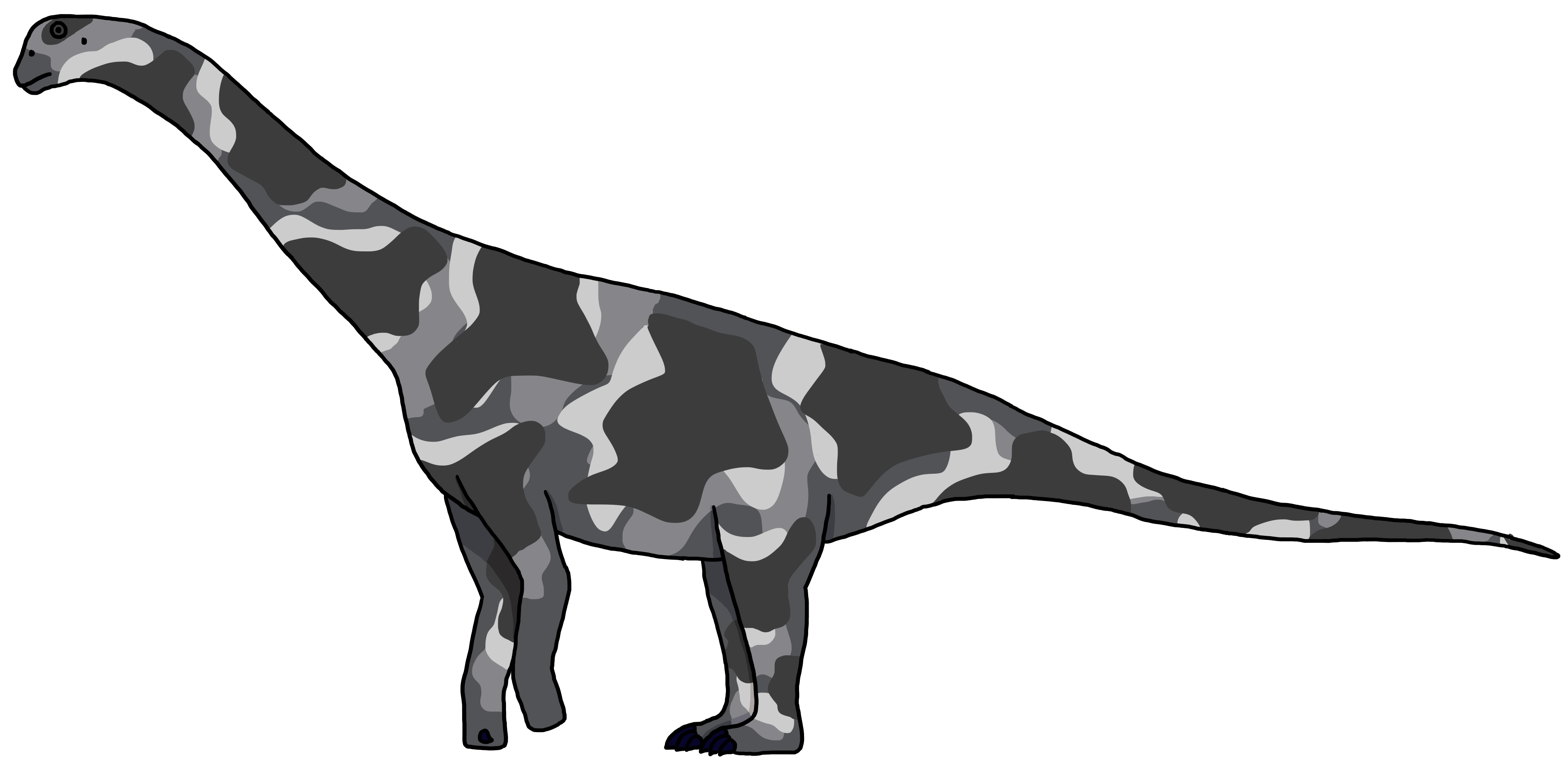
- Hypothetical life restoration

Scientific classification
- Domain: Eukaryota
- Kingdom: Animalia
- Phylum: Chordata
- Clade: Dinosauria
- Clade: Saurischia
- Clade: †Sauropodomorpha
- Clade: †Sauropoda
- Clade: †Neosauropoda
- Clade: †Macronaria (?)
- Genus: †Marmarospondylus; Owen, 1875
- Species: †M. robustus

Binomial name
- †Marmarospondylus robustus Owen, 1875

= Marmarospondylus =

Marmarospondylus Temporal range: Bathonian ~168–166 Ma

Extinct genus of dinosaurs

Marmarospondylus ("marble [reference to the Forest Marble Formation] vertebra") is a dubious genus of sauropod dinosaur from Middle Jurassic deposits in the English Midlands.

The type species, Marmarospondylus robustus, was described by Richard Owen as a species of the Late Jurassic genus Bothriospondylus in 1875. The holotype, NHMUK R.22428, a dorsal vertebra, was found in the Bathonian-age Forest Marble Formation at Bradford-on-Avon, Wiltshire. Owen himself in an addendum to the same publication coined Marmarospondylus for B. robustus, presumably due to its being older than B. suffossus. Recent publications have treated Marmarospondylus as a dubious member of Macronaria.
