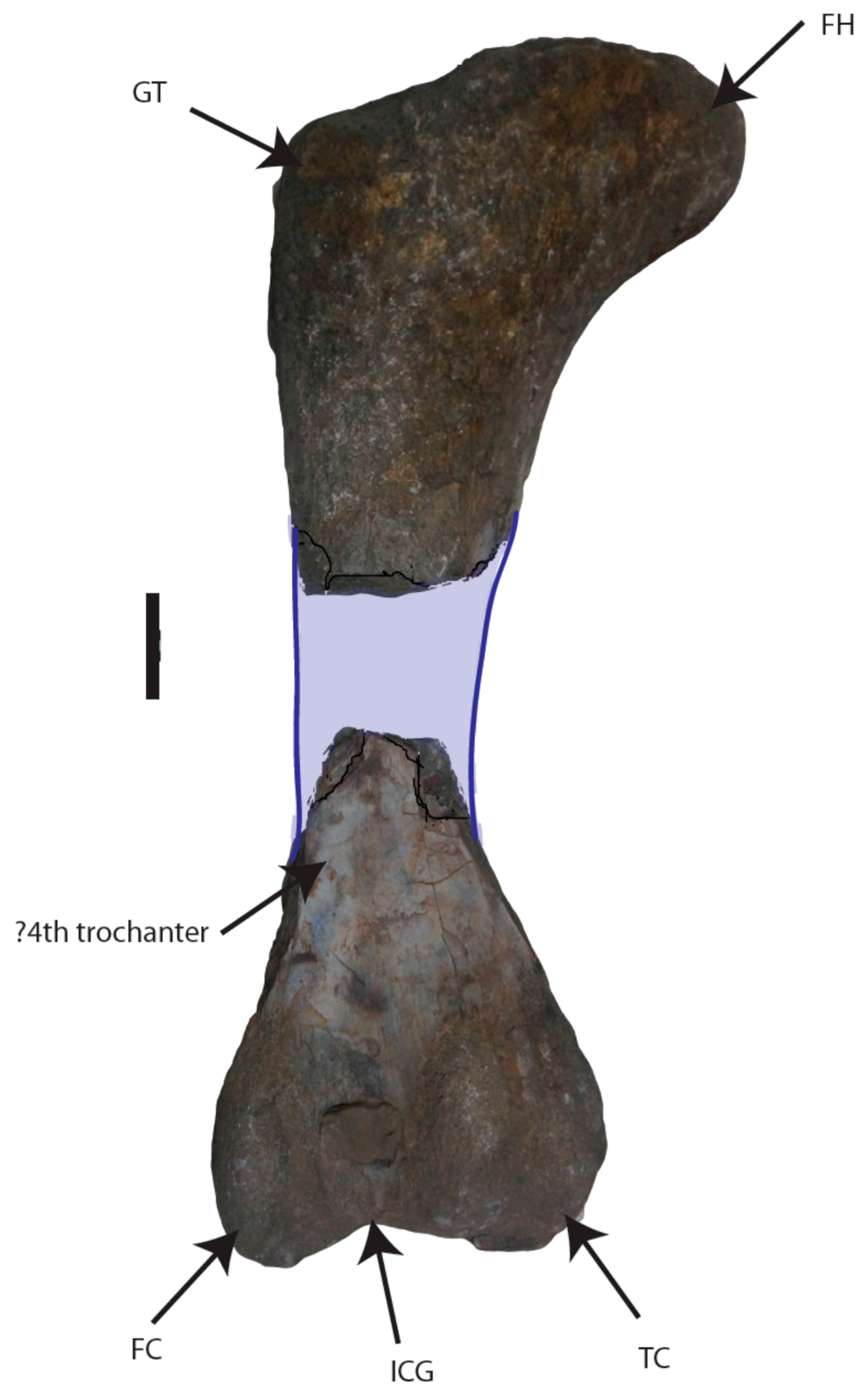
- Partial left femur

Scientific classification
- Kingdom: Animalia
- Phylum: Chordata
- Class: Reptilia
- Clade: Dinosauria
- Clade: Saurischia
- Clade: †Sauropodomorpha
- Clade: †Sauropoda
- Clade: †Gravisauria
- Clade: †Eusauropoda
- Genus: †Lapparentosaurus; Bonaparte, 1986
- Species: †L. madagascariensis

Binomial name
- †Lapparentosaurus madagascariensis Bonaparte, 1986

= Lapparentosaurus =

Lapparentosaurus Temporal range: Bathonian ~168–165 Ma

Extinct genus of dinosaurs

Lapparentosaurus is a genus of sauropod dinosaur from the Middle Jurassic. Its fossils were found in Madagascar (Isalo III Formation). It contains one species, Lapparentosaurus madagascariensis. The genus and species were named by José Bonaparte in 1986. The classification of Lapparentosaurus is controversial, as it exhibits a combination of characteristics of basal sauropods and titanosauriforms.

== Discovery and naming ==
In 1895 Richard Lydekker named a new species of Bothriospondylus, B. madagascariensis based on fossils found before 1894 by Joseph Thomas Last in the Majunga Basin in layers of the Bathonian, the Isalo III Formation. In a 1975 unpublished thesis, A. Ogier described a large amount of juvenile sauropod material, also from the Isalo III Formation, that he identified as more specimens of Bothriospondylus. In 1986, José Fernando Bonaparte considered the referral of all the Malagasy sauropod material to Bothriospondylus to be unjustified, and due to the distinctiveness of the material described by Ogier, Bonaparte proposed the new genus and species Lapparentosaurus madagascariensis for it. He designated two neural arches of dorsal vertebrae, MAA 91-92, as the holotype of his new species. The generic name honours Albert-Félix de Lapparent.

Upchurch and colleagues considered Bonaparte's diagnosis of Lapparentosaurus to be inadequate, but accepted it as a valid taxon due to its unusual combination of characteristics of titanosauriforms and basal sauropods.

== Specimens ==
Much more abundant material has been referred, from at least three but perhaps as much as ten individuals from different growth stages. This includes vertebrae and limb elements but no skulls. Age determination studies performed using growth ring counts suggest that this sauropod took 31–45 years to reach sexual maturity and was relatively fast-growing given the presence of a large amount of fibrolamellar bone.

== Classification ==
The phylogenetic position of Lapparentosaurus was long poorly understood. It exhibits an unusual combination of characters of both basal and derived sauropods. It has been classified as a brachiosaurid or an indeterminate titanosauriform. However, recent phylogenetic analyses have shown it to be a basal eusauropod, not closely related to brachiosaurids at all. After many decades, Emilie Läng in 2008 recovered a traditional Cetiosauridae including Lapparentosaurus. An in-depth revision in 2019 of the genus by Raveloson, Clark & Rasoamiaramana recovered a similar position with Lapparentosaurus being part of a paraphyletic Cetiosauridae, also including a multitude of similar Middle Jurassic cetiosaurids such as Chebsaurus, Ferganasaurus, and Cetiosaurus. This position is supported by the presence of two autapomorphies common on both Lapparentosaurus and Cetiosaurus: a pyramid-shaped neural spine from the anterior dorsal vertebrae with tapering in shape or not flaring distally and loss of the spinodiapophyseal lamina on the dorsal vertebrae.

== Gallery ==
All possible remains of Lapparentosaurus:

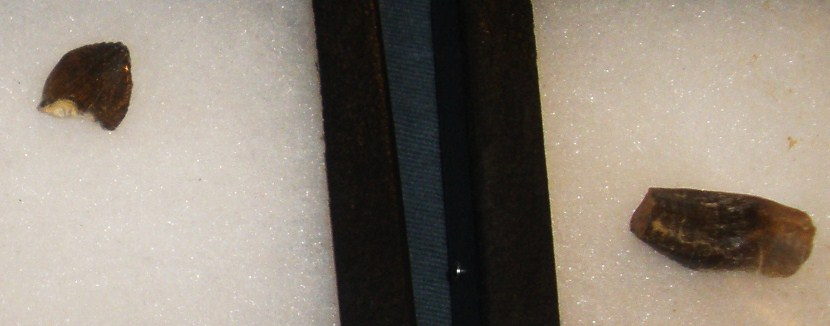
Teeth

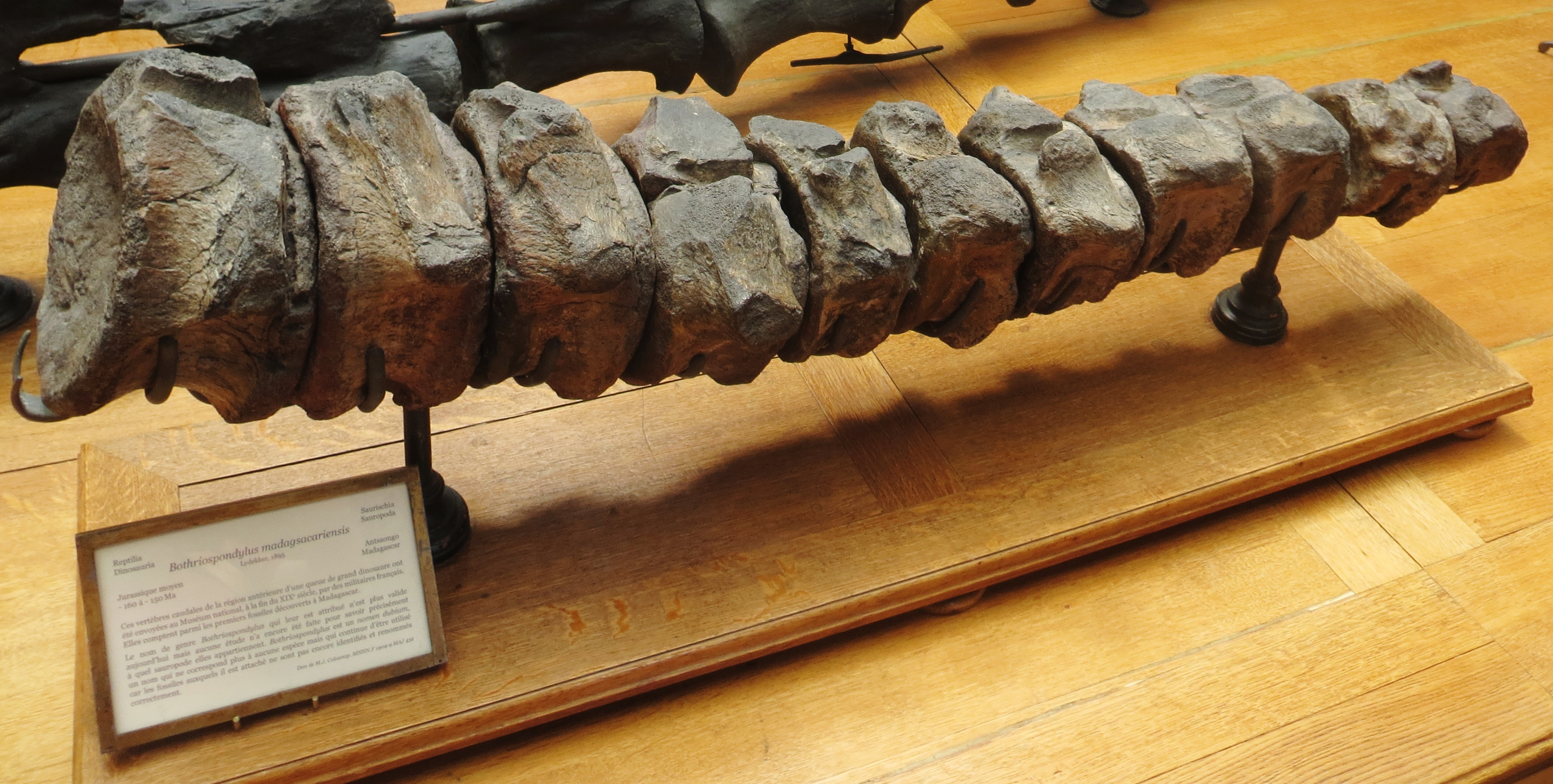
Caudal vertebrae

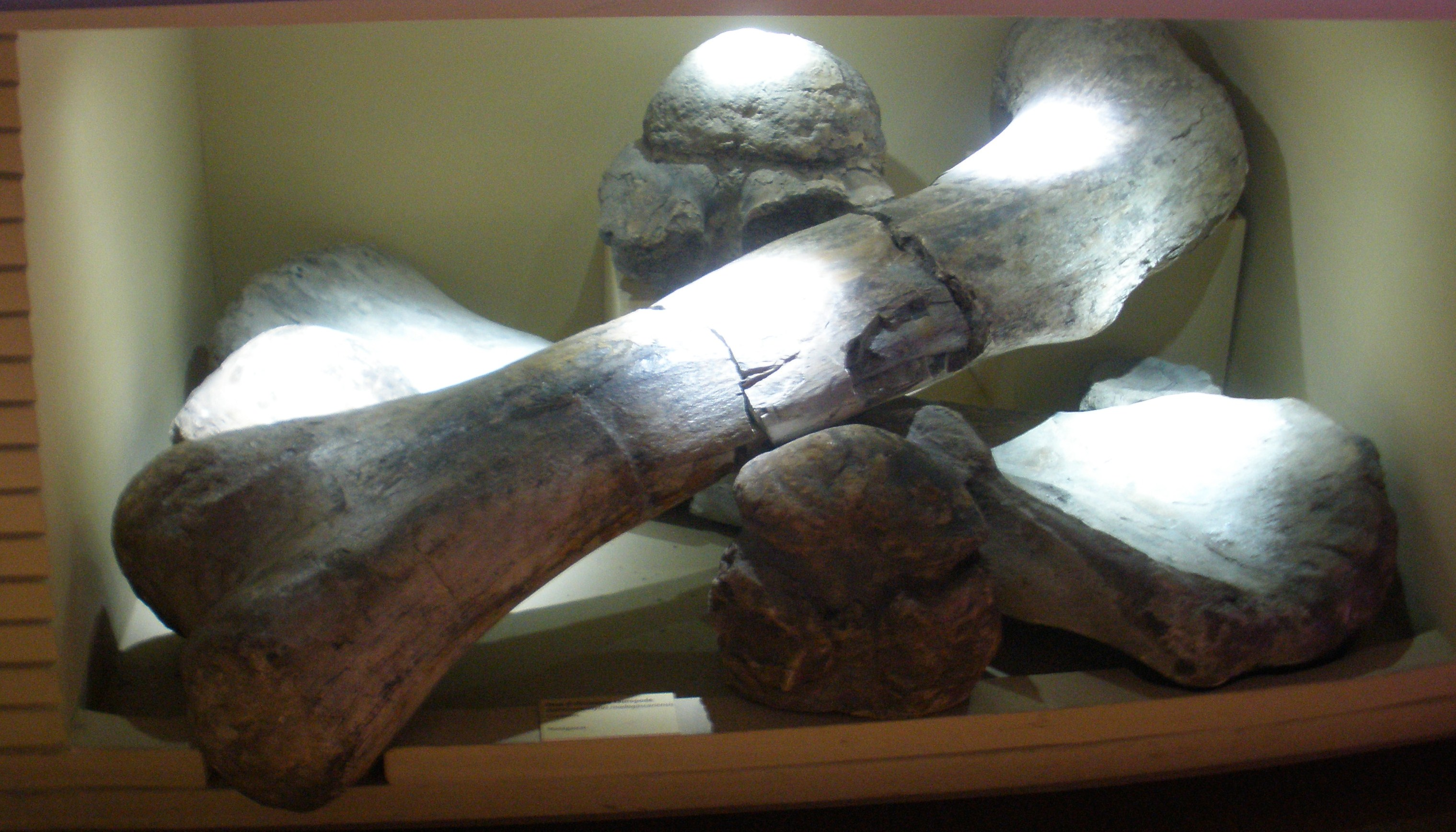
Limb bones

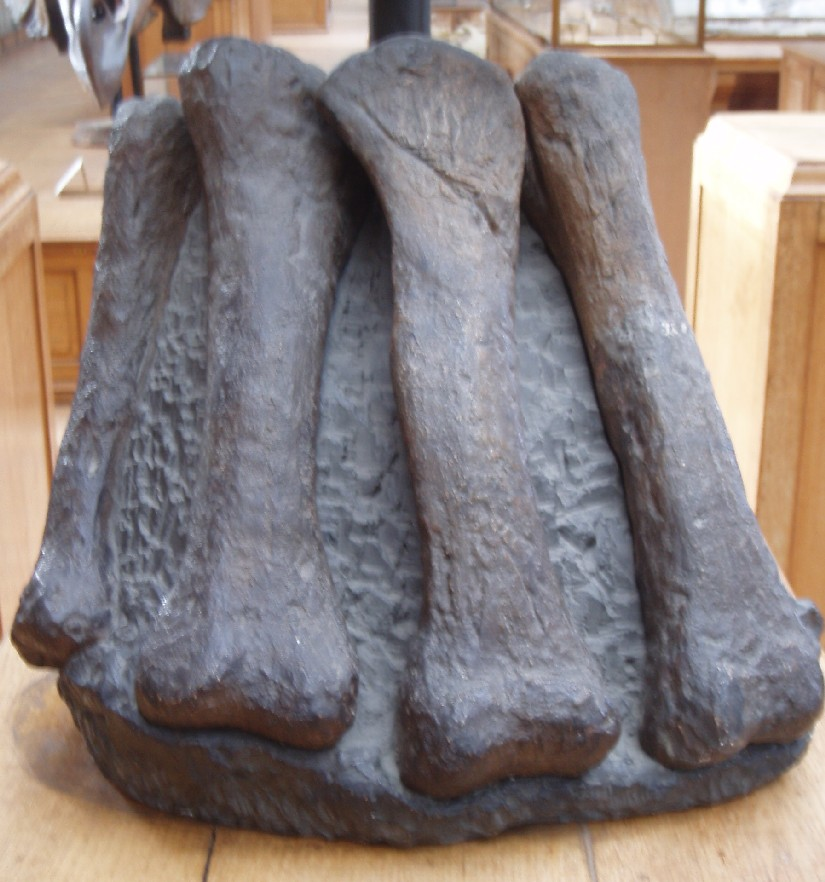
Metatarsals
