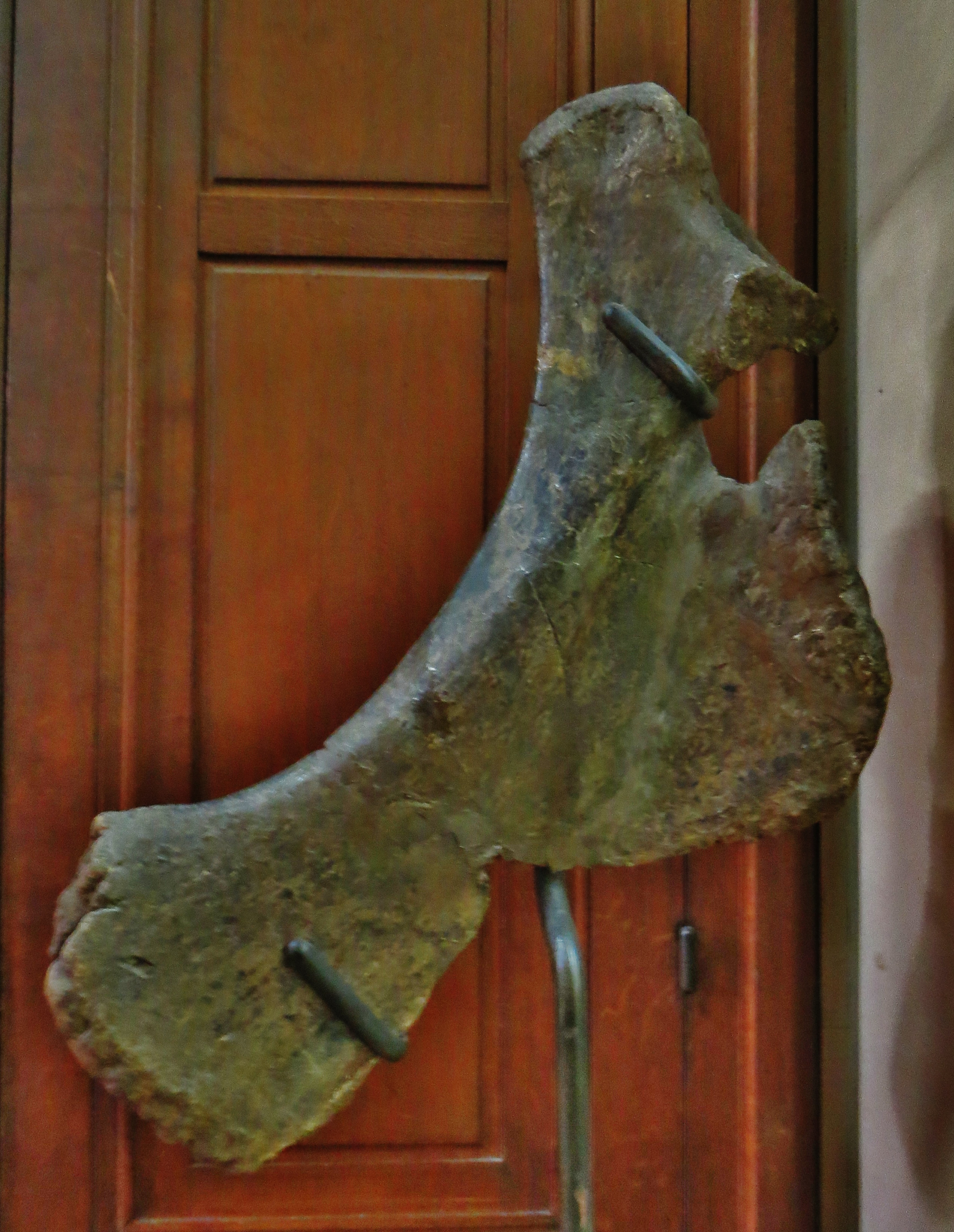
- Left pubis (MNHN MAJ 430)

Scientific classification
- Kingdom: Animalia
- Phylum: Chordata
- Class: Reptilia
- Clade: Dinosauria
- Clade: Saurischia
- Clade: †Sauropodomorpha
- Clade: †Sauropoda
- Clade: †Turiasauria
- Genus: †Narindasaurus; Royo-Torres et al., 2020
- Species: †N. thevenini

Binomial name
- †Narindasaurus thevenini Royo-Torres et al., 2020

= Narindasaurus =

Narindasaurus Temporal range: Middle Jurassic, ~168–165 Ma

Genus of sauropod dinosaur (fossil)

Narindasaurus (meaning "Narinda Bay lizard") is a genus of turiasaurian sauropod dinosaur from the Middle Jurassic Isalo III Formation of Madagascar. The type and only species is Narindasaurus thevenini. The only known specimen of the genus was first described in 1907, but it was not formally named as a distinct species until 2020.

== Discovery and naming ==
Sauropod specimens were collected from various sites in Madagascar for the Muséum d'Histoire Naturelle de Paris between 1896 and 1905. They were briefly noted on by Paul Lemoine in 1906. In 1907, Armand Thevenin described the specimen that would later become the holotype of Narindasaurus thevenini as belonging to the species Bothriospondylus madagascariensis. It was briefly mentioned in 1972. In 1986, José Bonaparte considered the specimens described by Thevenin to belong to the species Lapparentosaurus madagascariensis. It was reevaluated in 2008 and 2010 as both a distinct taxon and a non-neosauropod eusauropod. Its teeth were noted as being characteristic of turiasaurs in 2015. The genus and species Narindasaurus thevenini were named in 2020 by Rafael Royo-Torres and colleagues, and it was demonstrated to be a turiasaur by phylogenetic analysis. The genus name refers to Narinda Bay, which is near the type locality of the species, and the species name honors Thevenin.

== Fossil record ==
The holotype and only known specimen of Narindasaurus thevenini is a partial skeleton recovered from the Isalo III Formation of Madagascar. The specimen, which is housed at the Muséum national d’Histoire naturelle, is composed of a right maxillary or premaxillary tooth (MNHN MAJ 423), an anterior caudal vertebra (MNHN MAJ 424), a posterior caudal vertebra (MNHN MAJ 426), a middle-anterior chevron (MNHN MAJ 425), a right ulna (MNHN MAJ 427), a right tibia (MNHN MAJ 428), a right fibula with a distal chevron attached (MNHN MAJ 429) and a left pubis (MNHN MAJ 430).

== Description ==
The teeth show the heart-shaped morphology typical of turiasaurs. The caudal vertebrae from the middle-anterior region of the tail show an asymmetric lateral fossa that is placed in a posterior position, uniquely to the genus.
