= Damparis =

Commune in Bourgogne-Franche-Comté, France

- Commune
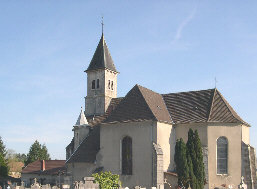
- The church in Damparis

- Coat of arms
- Location of Damparis
- Location within France Location within Bourgogne-Franche-Comté
- Coordinates: 47°04′30″N 5°24′49″E
- Country: France
- Region: Bourgogne-Franche-Comté
- Department: Jura
- Arrondissement: Dole
- Canton: Dole-2
- Intercommunality: CA Grand Dole

Government
  - Mayor (2020–2026): Michel Giniès
- Area^{1}: 8.85 km^{2} (3.42 sq mi)
- Highest elevation: 245 m (804 ft)
- Lowest elevation: 187 m (614 ft)
- Population (2023): 2,587
  - Density: 292/km^{2} (757/sq mi)
- Time zone: UTC+01:00 (CET)
  - Summer (DST): UTC+02:00 (CEST)
- INSEE/Postal code: 39189 /39500
- ^{1} French Land Register data, which excludes lakes, ponds, glaciers > 1 km^{2} (0.386 sq mi or 247 acres) and river estuaries.

Damparis (French pronunciation: [dɑ̃paʁi]) is a commune in the Jura department in Bourgogne-Franche-Comté in eastern France.

== Population ==
Historical population

Year	Pop.	±% p.a.
1793	502	—
1800	536	+0.94%
1806	613	+2.26%
1821	657	+0.46%
1831	630	−0.42%
1836	721	+2.74%
1841	744	+0.63%
1846	730	−0.38%
1851	724	−0.16%
1856	582	−4.27%
1861	712	+4.11%
1866	780	+1.84%
1872	668	−2.55%
1876	870	+6.83%
1881	1,070	+4.23%
1886	765	−6.49%
1891	679	−2.36%
1896	643	−1.08%
1901	598	−1.44%

Year	Pop.	±% p.a.
1906	634	+1.18%
1911	670	+1.11%
1921	646	−0.36%
1926	794	+4.21%
1931	2,160	+22.16%
1936	1,830	−3.26%
1946	2,036	+1.07%
1954	2,301	+1.54%
1962	3,120	+3.88%
1968	3,140	+0.11%
1975	3,086	−0.25%
1982	2,680	−1.99%
1990	2,704	+0.11%
1999	2,799	+0.38%
2007	2,849	+0.22%
2012	2,759	−0.64%
2017	2,694	−0.48%
2023	2,587	−0.67%

Source: EHESS and INSEE (1968-2023)

== See also ==
- Communes of the Jura department
