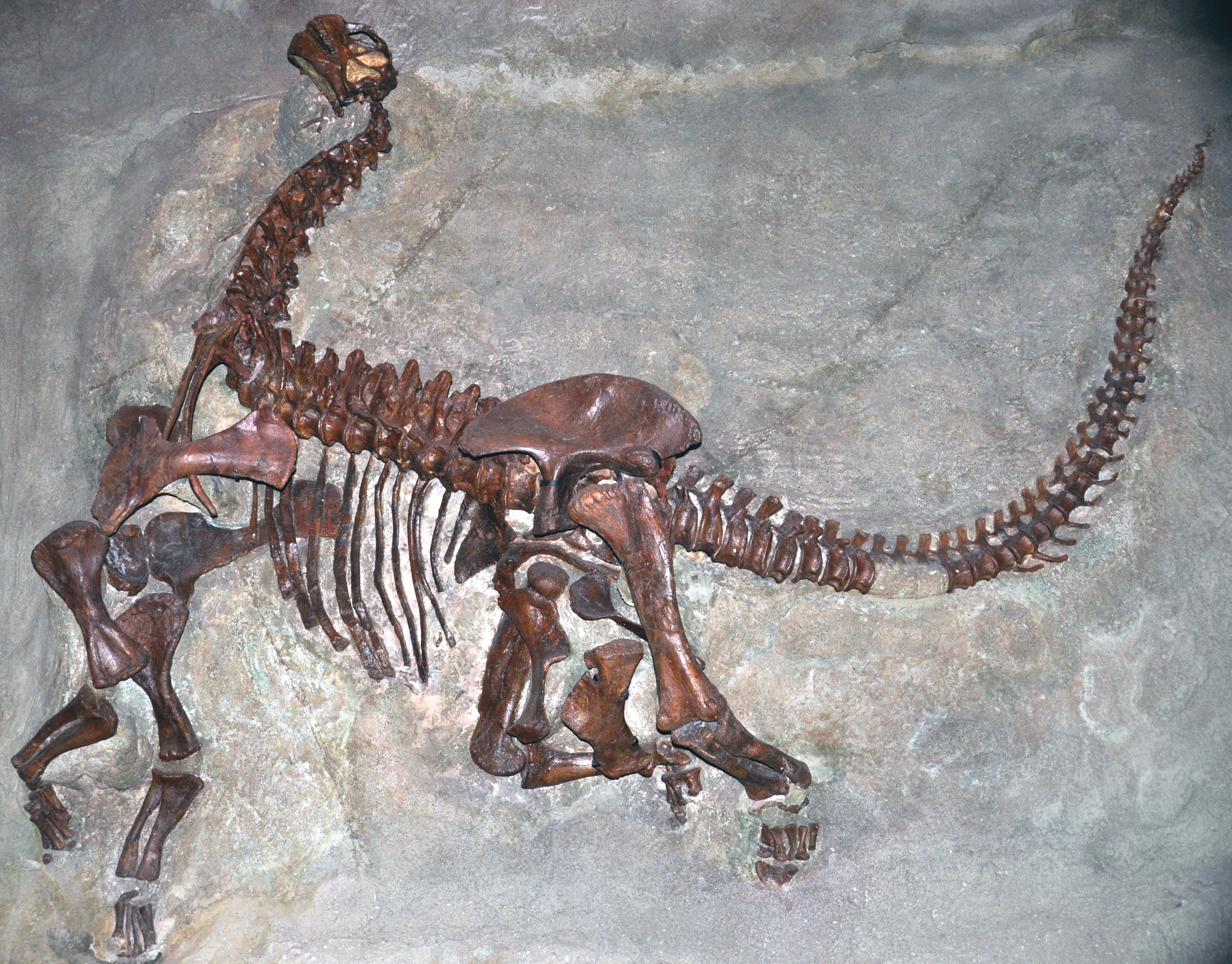
- CM 11338, a nearly complete skeleton of a juvenile C. lentus

Scientific classification
- Kingdom: Animalia
- Phylum: Chordata
- Class: Reptilia
- Clade: Dinosauria
- Clade: Saurischia
- Clade: †Sauropodomorpha
- Clade: †Sauropoda
- Clade: †Eusauropoda
- Clade: †Macronaria
- Family: †Camarasauridae
- Genus: †Camarasaurus; Cope, 1877

Type species
- †Camarasaurus supremus Cope, 1877

Other species
- †Camarasaurus grandis (Marsh, 1877); †Camarasaurus lentus (Marsh, 1889); †Camarasaurus lewisi (Jensen, 1988)

Synonyms
- List: Caulodon Cope, 1877; Morosaurus Marsh, 1878; Uintasaurus Holland, 1924; Cathetosaurus? Jensen, 1988

= Camarasaurus =

Camarasaurus Temporal range: Late Jurassic, Kimmeridgian to Tithonian, 155–143 Ma

Genus of dinosaur from the Late Jurassic

Camarasaurus (/ˌkæmərəˈsɔːrəs/ KAM-ər-ə-SOR-əs) is a genus of sauropod dinosaur that lived during the Late Jurassic (Kimmeridgian to Tithonian ages, c. 155 to 143 million years ago) in North America. Over 530 specimens have been found in rocks of the Morrison Formation in the western United States, including several nearly complete skeletons. It is the most common dinosaur in the Morrison Formation and one of the best understood sauropods.

Camarasaurus was a bulky sauropod with a proportionally wide rib cage. Its skull was proportionally larger and more strongly built than that of other sauropods, with powerful jaws that allowed for high bite forces. It had 13–14 teeth on each side of the upper jaw and 13 teeth on each side of the lower jaw. The teeth were spoon-shaped, tilted forwards, and rapidly replaced. Camarasaurus was probably a selective feeder that fed at heights of 2 to 5 m (7 to 16 ft). Specimens range from a presumed embryo to an individual that probably reached 40 years of age, one of the oldest reported ages for an individual dinosaur. Skin impressions have been found on one specimen, and several specimens show signs of injury or disease, such as bite marks and arthritis. Individuals might have seasonally migrated to avoid the dry season in the Morrison basin.

The name Camarasaurus means 'chambered lizard', referring to the chambers in the vertebrae of the neck and back. The genus was named in 1877 by Edward Drinker Cope, based on fossils from Garden Park, Colorado. Soon after, Cope's rival Othniel Charles Marsh named the new genus Morosaurus from specimens found in Como Bluff, Wyoming. Morosaurus and its species were later assigned to Camarasaurus. Probably in 1879, a life-sized drawing of the reconstructed skeleton was made, the oldest known reconstruction of a sauropod. From 1909, several largely complete skeletons have been discovered in Carnegie Quarry at what is now Dinosaur National Monument; some specimens, including a nearly complete skull, remain in the quarry wall.

Four species are commonly recognized: C. supremus, C. grandis, C. lentus, and C. lewisi. The most common species, C. lentus, was around 15 m (49 ft) in length; C. supremus was considerably larger. C. supremus might have been the youngest species, mostly occurring at the top of the Morrison Formation. Camarasaurus is a member of the group Macronaria. Some paleontologists have grouped Camarasaurus with genera like Tehuelchesaurus and Lourinhasaurus in the family Camarasauridae.

== History ==
=== Cope's discoveries of C. supremus at Garden Park ===
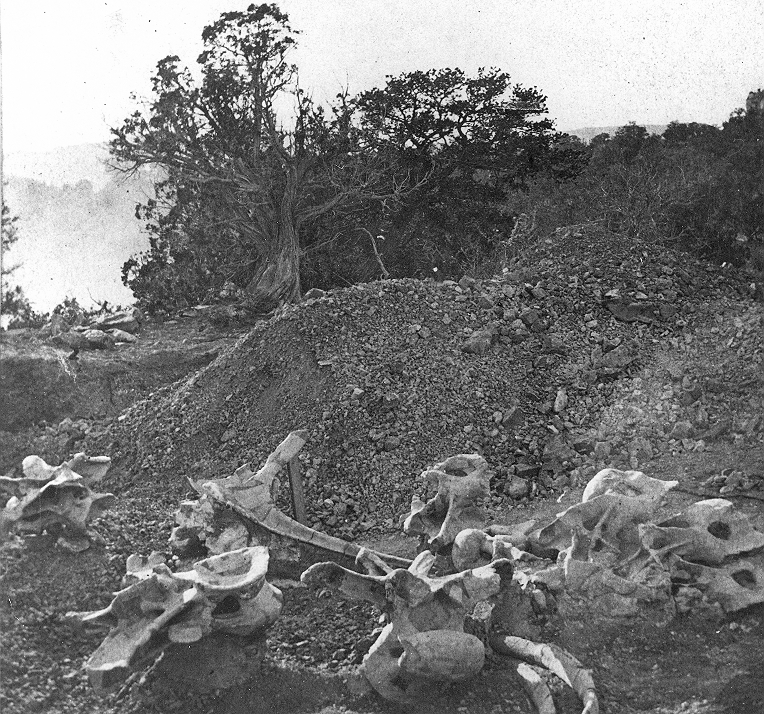
Field photograph of the first specimen of C. supremus found in 1877 and collected by Oramel W. Lucas

Camarasaurus was discovered during the Bone Wars, a feud between two American paleontologists, Othniel Charles Marsh and Edward Drinker Cope, that led to a surge of fossil discoveries in the Western United States in the late 19th century. In early 1877, David Baldwin, one of Marsh's fossil collectors, discovered very large bones at Garden Park, Colorado, on a peak locally known as "The Nipple". Baldwin found the bones while visiting the site where an alleged fossil bird had been discovered, (Note: Baldwin had purchased this fossil in a local shop. Marsh later identified it as a crocodylomorph. It is now known as Hallopus.) but neither he nor Marsh was interested in collecting them. Shortly after, the bones were encountered by the local teacher Oramel W. Lucas during a hunting trip. Lucas then wrote to Cope, who offered him payment for excavating the fossils. The first fossil that Cope received from Lucas was the jaw of a theropod, which Cope named Laelaps trihedrodon in a brief publication. The second shipment from Lucas contained one cervical (neck vertebra), three dorsals (trunk vertebrae), and four caudals (tail vertebrae) of a much larger animal, described by Cope as "the largest or most bulky animal capable of progression on land, of which we have any account".

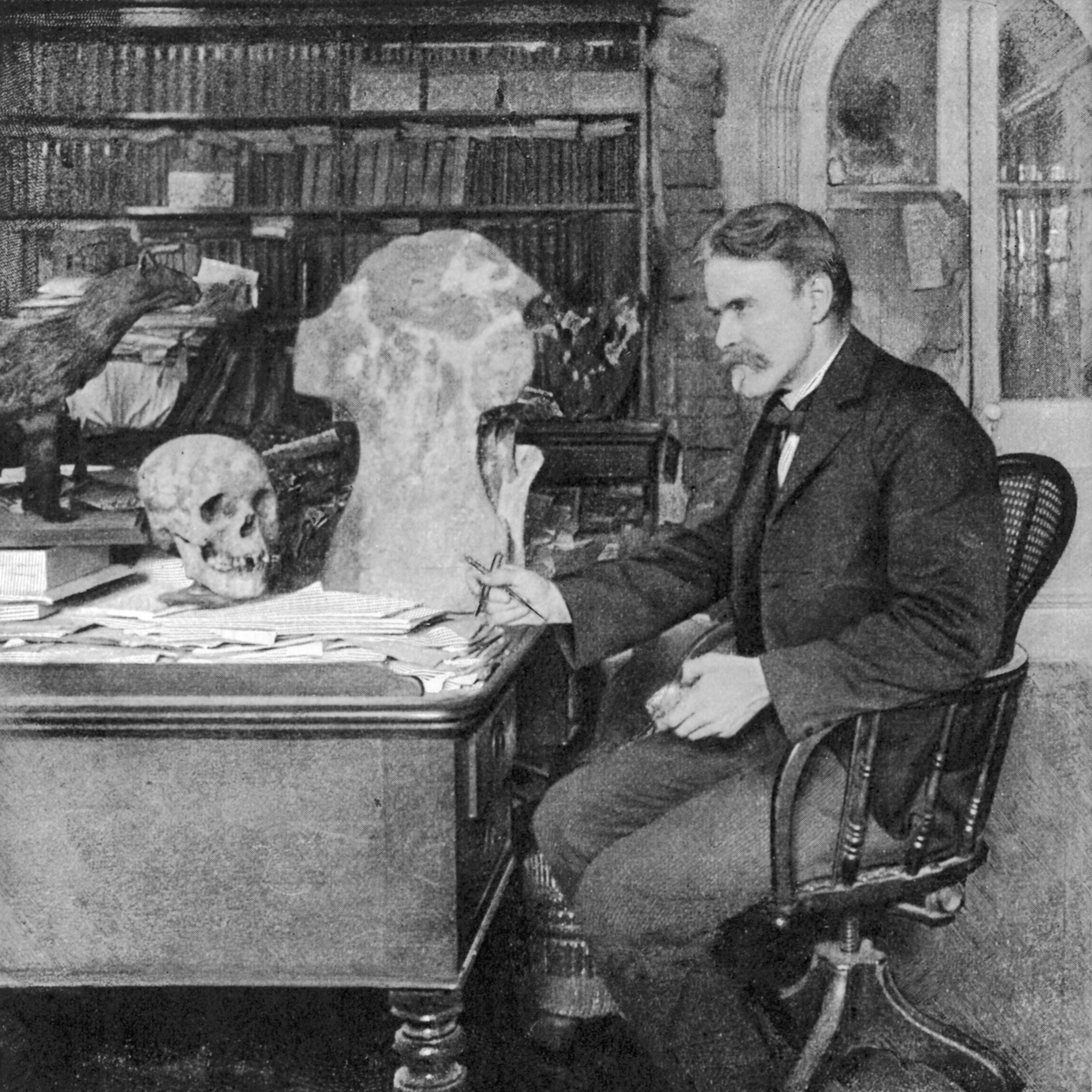
Edward Drinker Cope, the describer of Camarasaurus, with a C. supremus cervical vertebra

Cope gave these fossils the name Camarasaurus supremus in another quickly written 1877 publication. The name Camarasaurus means 'chamber lizard', from the Greek kamara 'chamber' and sauros 'lizard', alluding to the chambers in the cervical and dorsal vertebrae that, according to Cope, were "lighter in proportion to their bulk than in any air-breathing vertebrate". The specific name supremus is Latin for 'supreme'. Lucas and his brother, Ira H. Lucas, continued to send fossils to Cope until 1884, together representing much of the skeleton of C. supremus. Also amongst this material was a set of ten teeth, which Cope assigned to a new genus, Caulodon (meaning 'stalk tooth' (Note: The name Caulodon derives from the Greek kaulos 'stalk' and odous 'tooth', as Cope found its teeth to be long and hollow.)), in 1877. Caulodon is now thought to be a synonym of Camarasaurus.

For decades after its discovery, Camarasaurus would remain a relatively obscure taxon compared to the more complete and more extensively figured sauropods discovered by Cope's opponent Marsh. After Cope's death in 1897, his collection was acquired by the American Museum of Natural History (AMNH). The eight vertebrae originally described by Cope (catalogued as AMNH 5760) constitute the type material of C. supremus and probably stem from two individuals. (Note: Apart from the type material, the specimen number AMNH 5760 also encompasses other Camarasaurus fossils discovered by O. W. Lucas) In 1901, fossil collectors of the Carnegie Museum of Natural History excavated around "The Nipple" for two months but failed to recover any additional bones other than fragments.

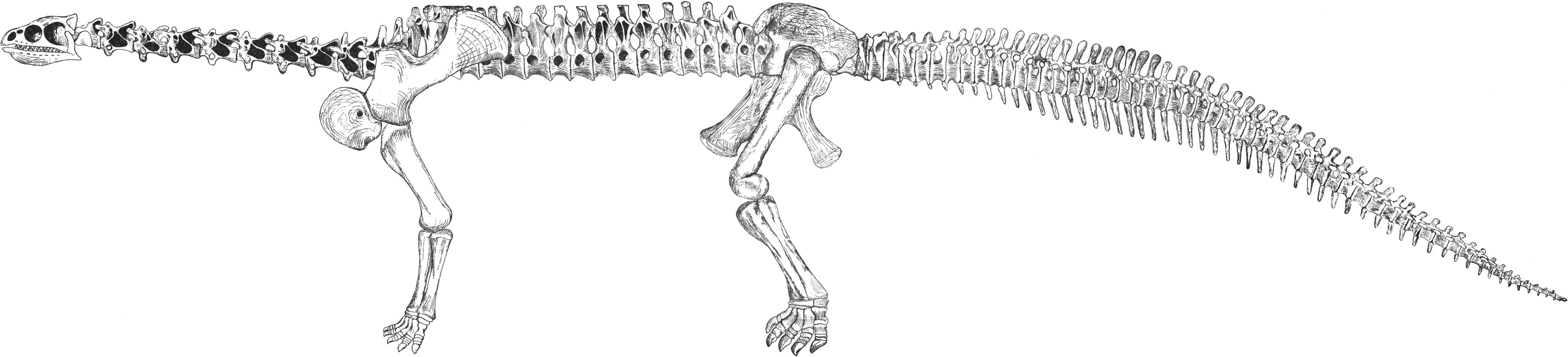
Life-sized restoration of C. supremus by John A. Ryder, c. 1879, the earliest skeletal reconstruction of a sauropod

Probably in early 1879, zoologist John A. Ryder created a life-sized drawing of the reconstructed skeleton on sheets of linen under Cope's direction. (Note: In 1921, Osborn and Mook wrote that the drawing was already exhibited on December 10, 1877, at the meeting of the American Philosophical Society in Philadelphia, Pennsylvania. However, in 1998, McIntosh found that Cope only presented life-size drawings of single bones at that meeting, and that Ryder's drawing must have been made after November 1878.) The drawing was 68 ft (21 m) long and was based on known Camarasaurus bones, as well as the reconstructed limbs of Morosaurus grandis that Marsh had published a few months earlier. Little was known of the skull at the time, and since most extant reptiles are carnivorous, it was assumed that the same applied to Camarasaurus. Consequently, the hypothetical skull bore long, sharp teeth. This drawing is the first skeletal reconstruction of a sauropod, although it was only published by Charles Craig Mook in 1914, at a much smaller scale of 1/100 natural size. In 1885, naturalist Charles Frederick Holder published a drawing of a living Camarasaurus, which might have been the first life restoration of a sauropod. The neck, tail, and limbs are depicted as very slender, and the snout features a short trunk.

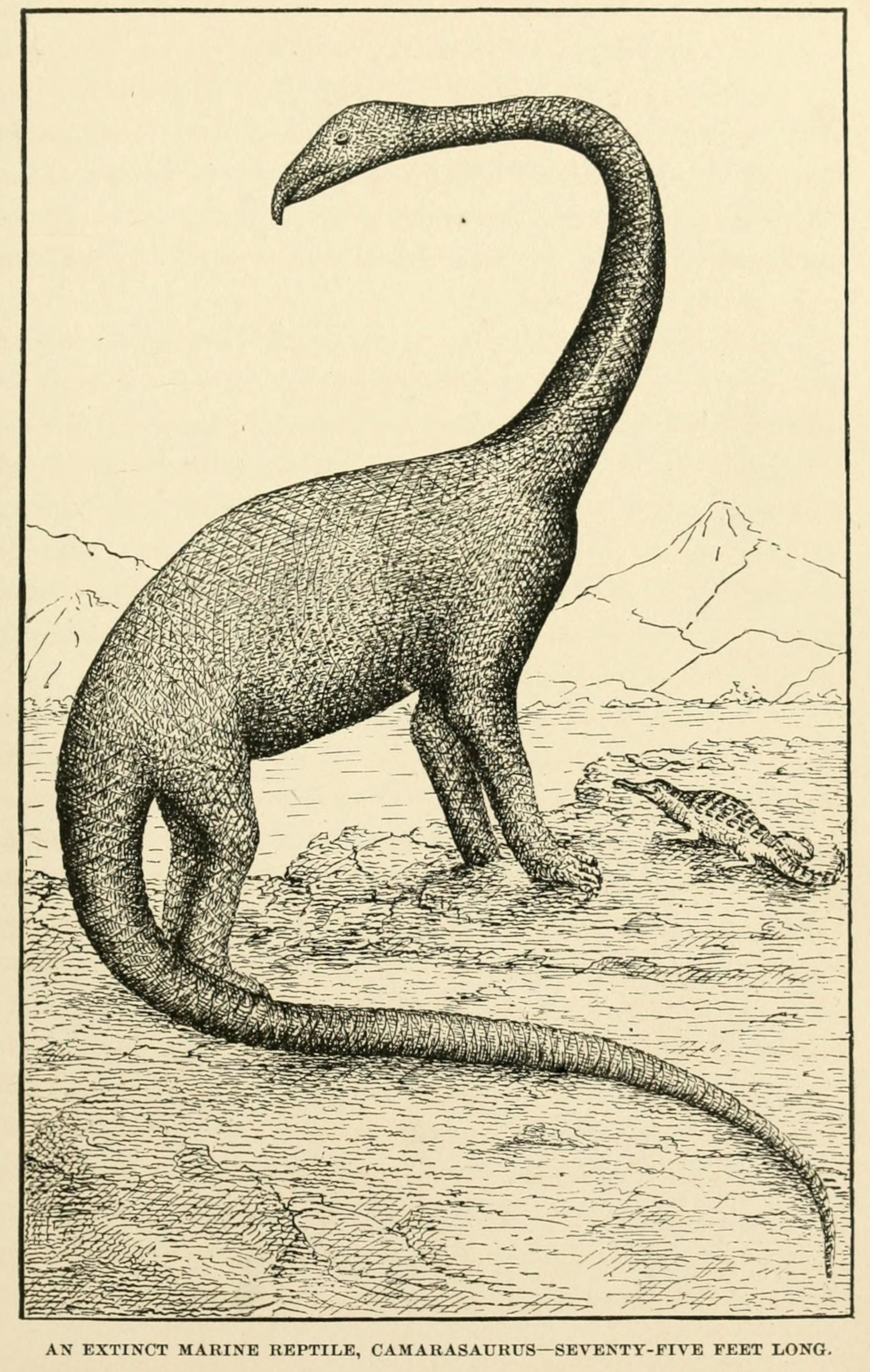
Historical life restoration of Camarasaurus published by Charles Frederick Holder in 1885, possibly the earliest life restoration of a sauropod

=== Marsh's discoveries of Morosaurus at Como Bluff ===
On March 7, 1877, at roughly the same time when Lucas began collecting Camarasaurus bones at Garden Park, the railway employee William Harlow Reed found fossil bones on a hill south of Como Station, Wyoming. This locality was to become one of the first major dinosaur sites: Como Bluff. Together with his colleague William Edward Carlin, Reed sent some of the bones to Marsh, including some articulated (connected) tail vertebrae, a dorsal (back) vertebra, and two limb bones. Although Reed and Carlin thought the bones came from the ground sloth Megatherium, Marsh recognized their dinosaurian nature and sent his assistant Samuel Wendell Williston to oversee and assist with collecting. Williston was staggered when seeing the locality, reporting "magnificently preserved" dinosaur bones "scattered for six or seven miles" (10–11 km).

In December 1877, Marsh described the bones of the first shipment (later cataloged as YPM 1901) as a new species of his previously established genus Apatosaurus, A. grandis. In late 1877 and early 1878, Marsh received more shipments from the same quarry, now known as YPM-Marsh Quarry 1. Besides many additional bones of the original A. grandis individual, these contained a partial skeleton of a second, similarly sized individual (YPM 1905). Parts of these skeletons were mixed up, and some bones cannot be reliably assigned to either. The shipments also contained a sacrum (the fused vertebrae of the hip), which Marsh described as a new genus and species, Morosaurus impar, in 1878. The name Morosaurus comes from the Greek μωρός (moros 'stupid'), in reference to its small brain size compared to its body size, and σαυρος (sauros 'lizard'). Later in 1878, Marsh wrote that his Morosaurus "must have been very sluggish in all its movements", and that "its brain was proportionately smaller than in any known vertebrate". He also moved A. grandis to Morosaurus, as M. grandis.

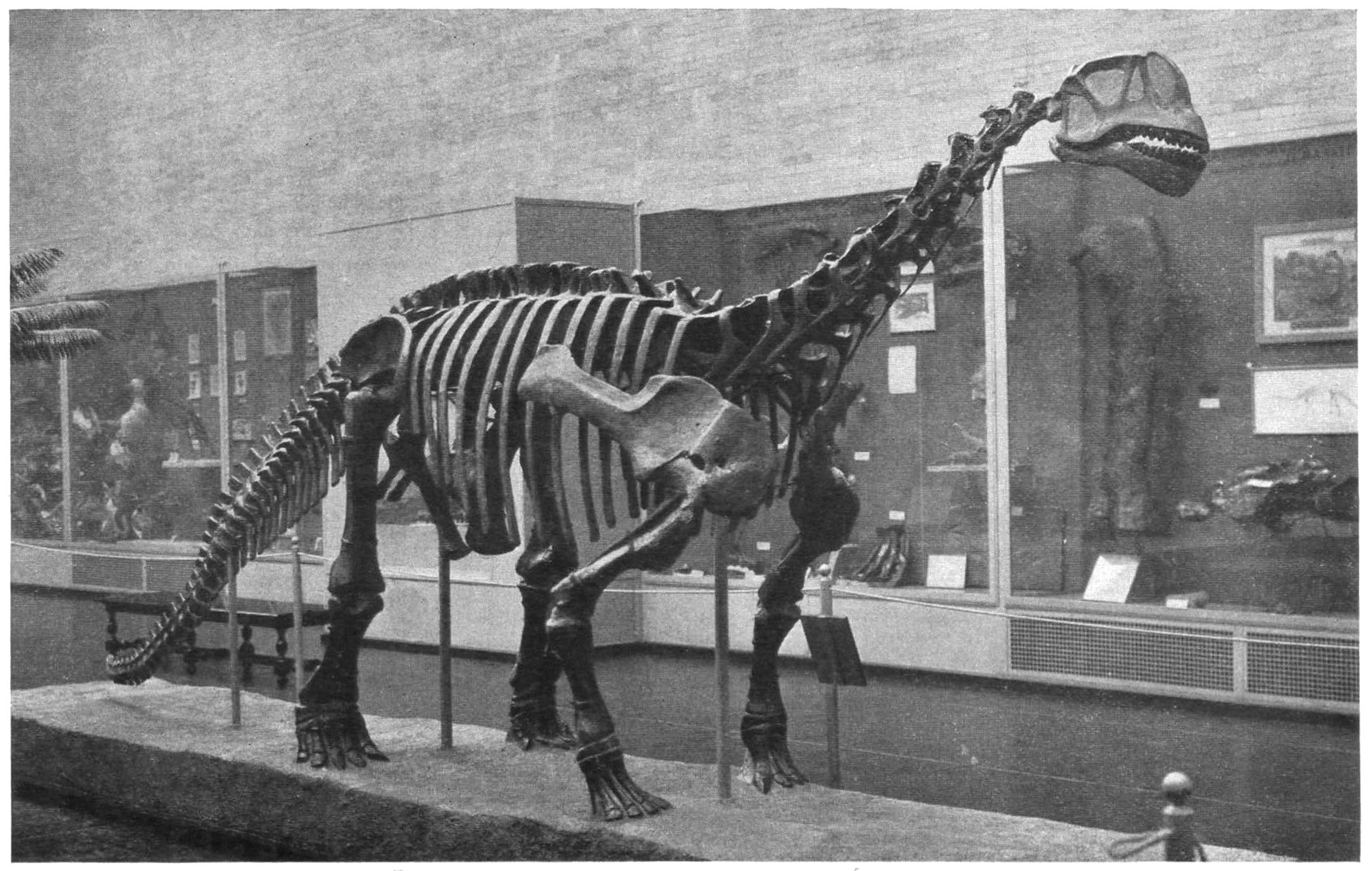
The mounted holotype (name-bearing) specimen of C. lentus at the Yale Peabody Museum

In 1889, Marsh named the new species Morosaurus lentus based on a nearly complete skeleton without skull found in the "stegosaur" quarry at Como Bluff. Marsh noted that the limbs were shorter, and that the vertebrae were more robust and had smaller cavities than those of other sauropod specimens known at the time. The specimen, YPM 1910, was later found to be a juvenile individual; it was mounted at the Yale Peabody Museum in 1930.

After the Bone Wars, paleontologists began to revise the many dinosaur genera and species that had been hurriedly named by Marsh and Cope. In 1898, Henry Fairfield Osborn, who despised Marsh, even implied that the genera Atlantosaurus, Apatosaurus, Amphicoelias, and Brontosaurus were all synonyms of Cope's Camarasaurus, which would have priority as it was named first. From 1901, several papers suggested that Morosaurus and Camarasaurus might be the same genus, and in 1914, Mook formally synonymized the two genera.

=== Discoveries at Bone Cabin Quarry and Dinosaur National Monument ===
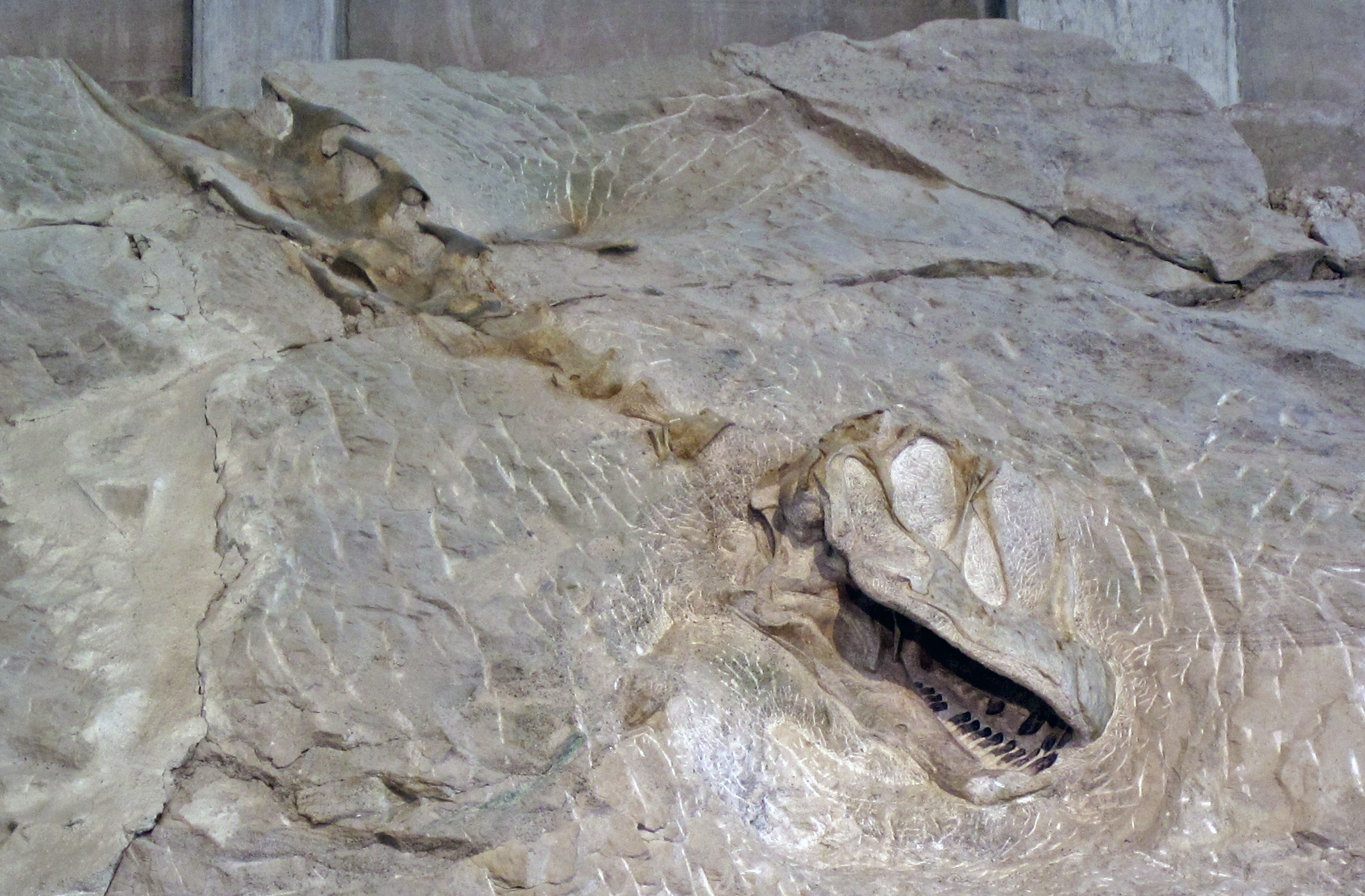
Skull and neck of C. lentus specimen DINO 2580 in the quarry wall at Dinosaur National Monument

From the mid-1890s, excavations in the Morrison Formation were increasingly carried out by large institutions such as the AMNH, the Carnegie Museum of Natural History (CM), and the Field Museum of Natural History (FMNH), rather than by private collectors such as Cope and Marsh. In 1898, an AMNH team led by Walter Granger and Peter Kaisen began working at Bone Cabin Quarry, a newly discovered locality just north of Como Bluff. The wealth of fossils from this locality allowed for new reconstructions of the fore- and hind limbs of Camarasaurus and some other sauropods. The quarry also yielded skulls of several dinosaurs, including the first nearly complete skull of Camarasaurus (FR 467), found connected to a sequence of neck vertebrae.

In 1909, Earl Douglass of the Carnegie Museum discovered Carnegie Quarry, in what is now Dinosaur National Monument near Jensen, Utah. Over the following decades, three almost complete skeletons and six skulls of Camarasaurus were found. In 1919 and 1920, Douglass excavated the fully articulated skeleton of a juvenile (CM 11338), which is, as of 2021, still regarded as one of the most complete sauropod skeletons ever discovered. This skeleton was described by Charles W. Gilmore in 1925, who assigned it to the species C. lentus. The original skeleton was put on display at the Carnegie Museum in 1924, and replicas are shown in many other museums. In 1924, Carnegie Museum's director William Jacob Holland described the new genus Uintasaurus (after Uintah County, Utah) based on five cervical vertebrae from Carnegie Quarry; this genus is now considered as a synonym of Camarasaurus.

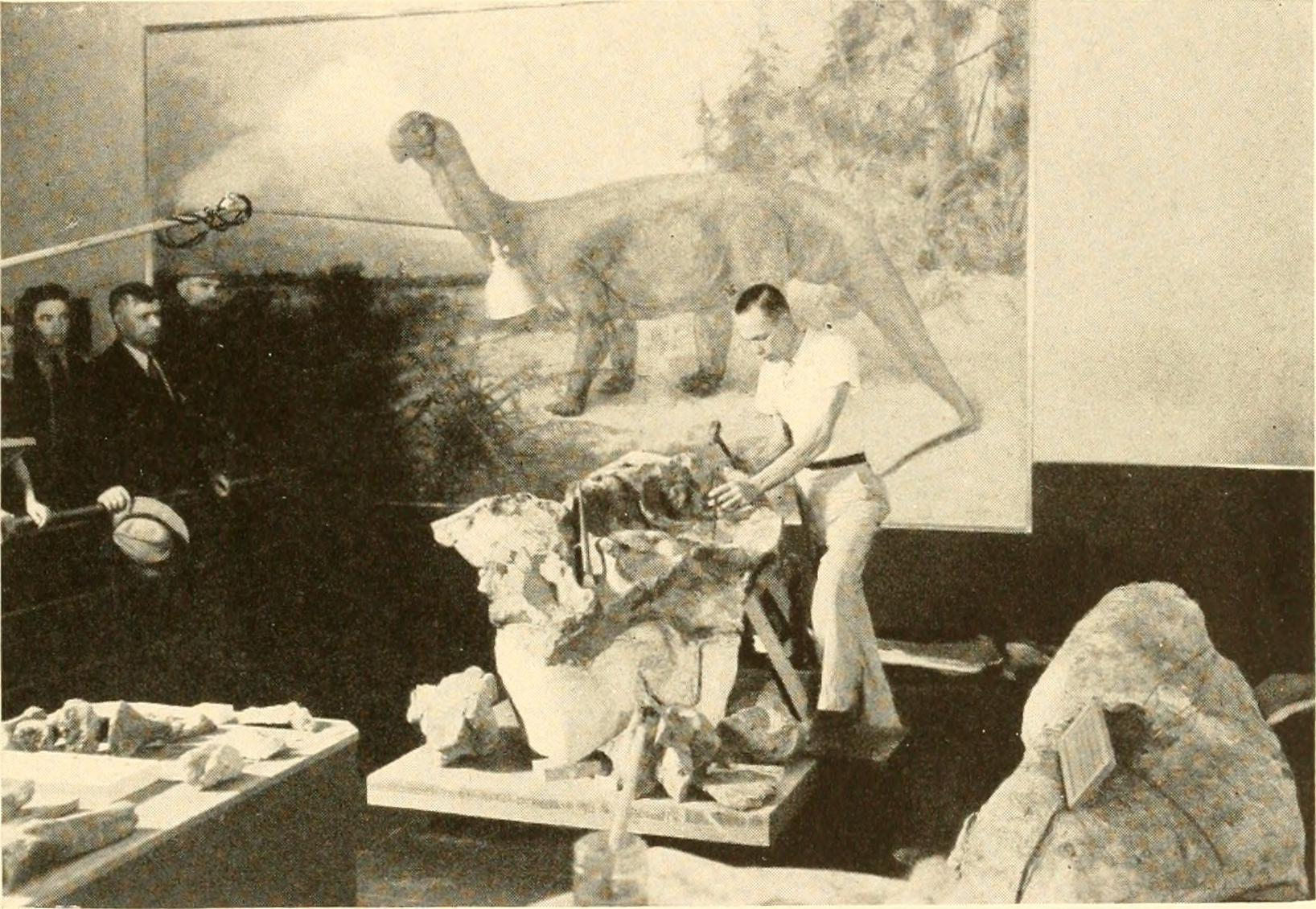
The public preparation of the C. lentus specimen USNM 13786 during the Texas Centennial Exposition of 1936

In 1918 and 1919, another nearly complete skeleton (USNM 13786 (Note: USNM 13786 was previously catalogued as CM 11373 and NMNH 13786.)) was excavated at Carnegie Quarry but remained unprepared. This skeleton was acquired by the National Museum of Natural History (NMNH) in 1935; publicly prepared at the Texas Centennial Exposition of 1936 in Dallas; mounted in a death pose at the NMNH in 1950; and re-mounted as a free-standing skeleton in 2019. In 1955, the skull DINO 28 was discovered together with a fragmentary skeleton in the Carnegie Quarry. As this skull was found disarticulated, the individual skull bones could be studied from all sides, allowing for the first thorough description of the braincase of Camarasaurus, published by Theodore E. White in 1958. Several Camarasaurus specimens are still in-place in the quarry wall at Dinosaur National Monument, and have only been partly freed from the rock. This includes DINO 4393, the most complete dinosaur skeleton that is still present on the wall; its skull is partly hidden behind other bones. DINO 2580 is a nearly complete skull with neck in the center of the quarry wall, and well-visible from the viewing platform.

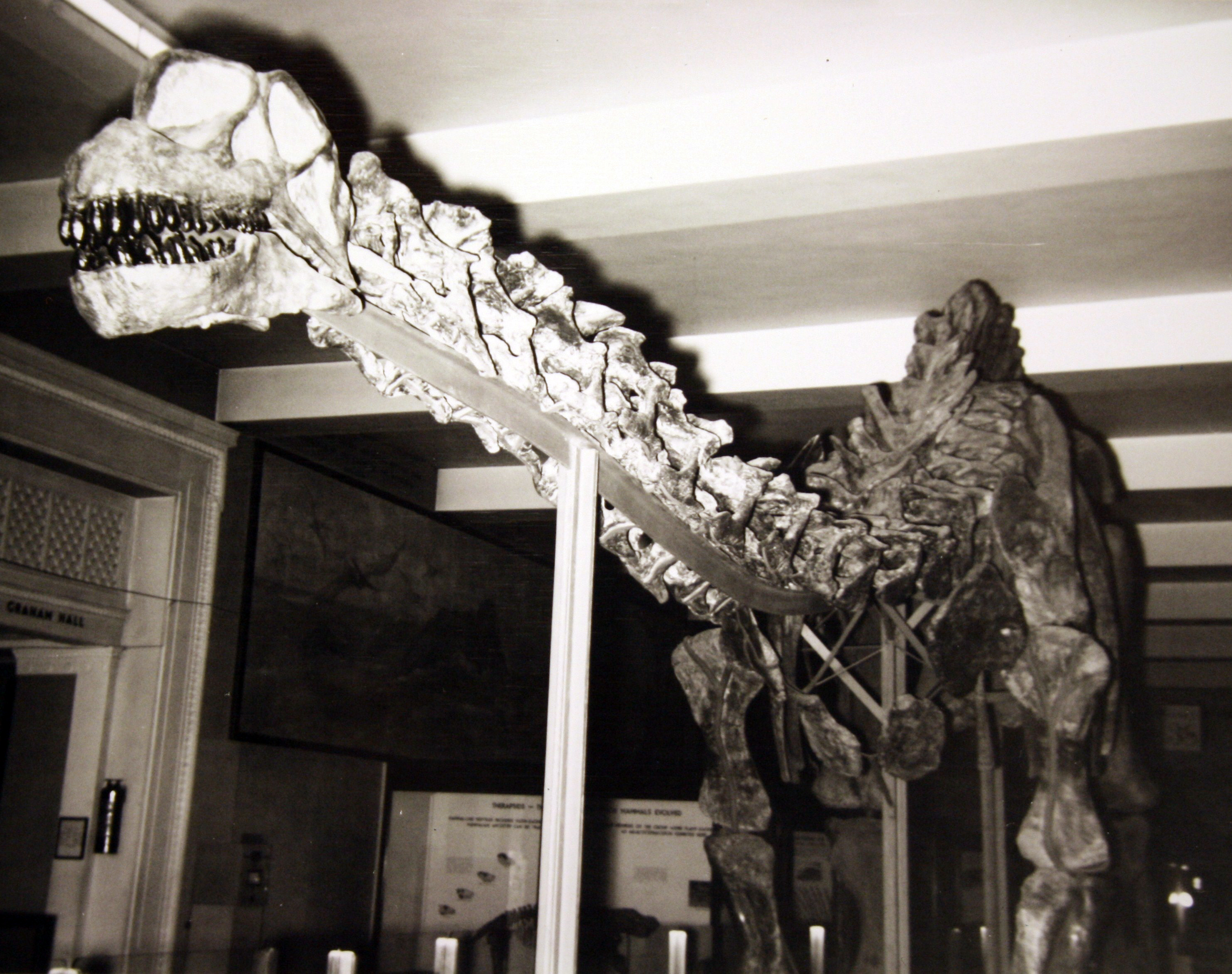
Apatosaurus mount with a skull of Camarasaurus at the Field Museum of Natural History in the 1950s

Historically, Brontosaurus and Apatosaurus (Note: Apatosaurus and Brontosaurus were thought to be synonyms for much of the 20th century.) were assumed to have had Camarasaurus-like skulls. In 1905, Osborn had the skull of his Apatosaurus mount at the AMNH modeled after that of Camarasaurus, and in 1934, the cast of a Camarasaurus skull found at Carnegie Quarry (CM 12020) was used to complete the previously headless mount of the Apatosaurus louisiae type skeleton at the Carnegie Museum. The skull of the Brontosaurus mount at the Yale Peabody Museum was roughly modeled after Camarasaurus in 1931, and the Apatosaurus mount at the Field Museum was given a cast Camarasaurus skull in 1958. These mounts were corrected after the actual skull of Apatosaurus was identified in 1975.

=== Cathetosaurus and further discoveries ===
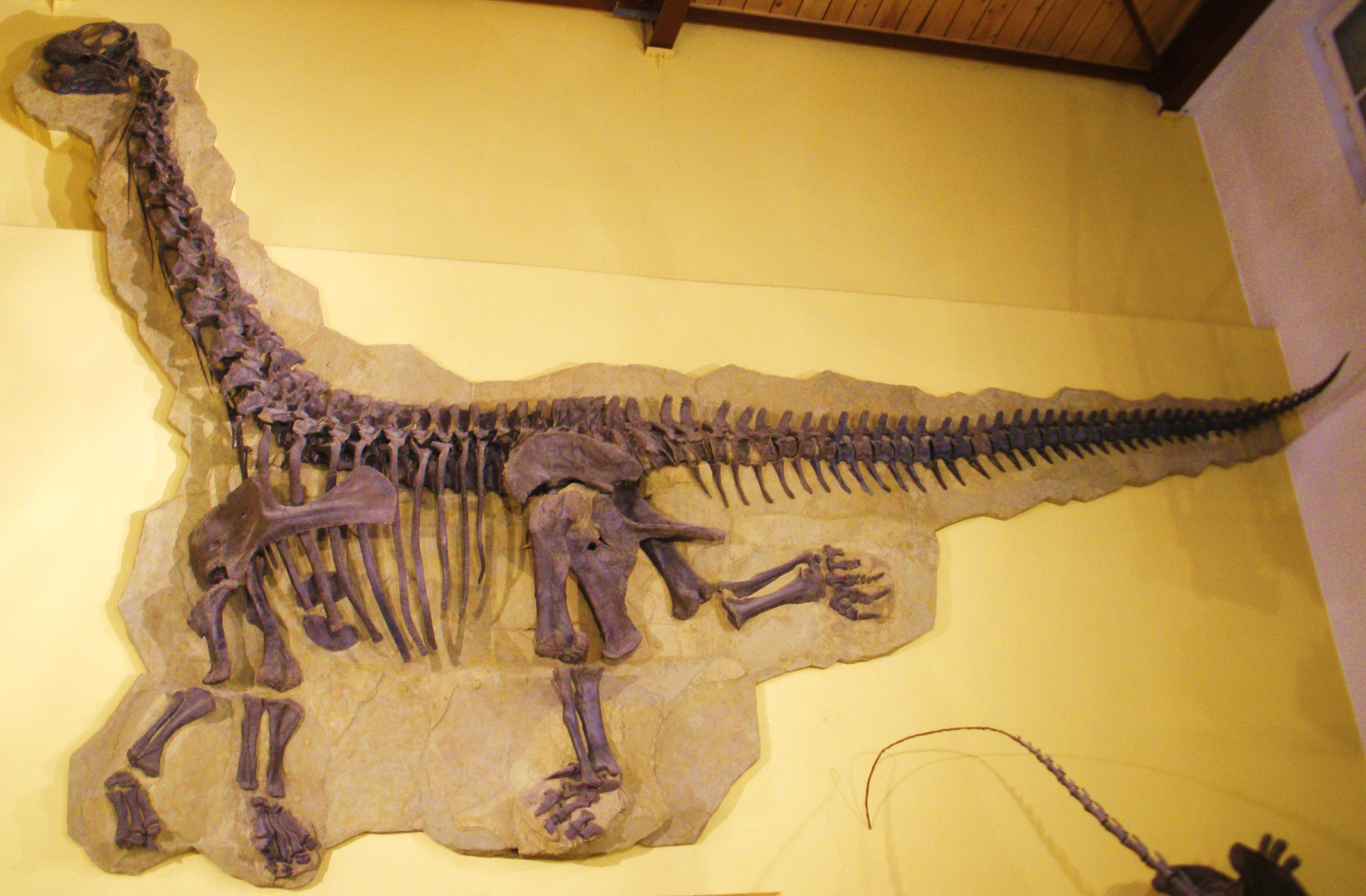
Specimen "E.T." at the Sauriermuseum Aathal

In 1967, James A. Jensen collected an articulated skeleton (BYU 9740) from the Uncompahgre Plateau in western Colorado; this skeleton was two-thirds complete but without skull. The skeleton remained unprepared for many years, but in 1988 Jensen described it under the new genus and species Cathetosaurus lewisi. The name Cathetosaurus comes from the Greek κάθετος (kathetos 'vertical'), in reference to its supposed ability to stand upright, and σαυρος (sauros 'lizard'). The specific name lewisi honors Arnold D. Lewis, who had trained Jensen in field and laboratory methods. In 1996, John Stanton McIntosh and colleagues determined that Cathetosaurus lewisi was a distinct species of Camarasaurus, as its differences from other Camarasaurus species were not general enough to warrant a separate genus; this opinion was supported by most later studies.

In 1992, a 65% complete skeleton of C. grandis was collected by the fossil hunter Jeffrie Parker and team from near Bone Cabin Quarry. This specimen (GMNH-PV 101) now resides at the Gunma Museum of Natural History in Gunma, Japan. Another well-preserved Camarasaurus specimen was found in 1992 at the Howe-Stephens Quarry in Wyoming by a Swiss collecting team of the Sauriermuseum Aathal. The skeleton (NMZ 1000002, nicknamed "E.T.") (Note: Previously, NMZ 1000002 was catalogued as SMA 0002.) is almost complete and articulated, and skin impressions have been found in the skull and hind limb. In 2017, the hitherto northernmost specimen, an incomplete skull with skeleton (GPDM 220) from the Little Snowy Mountains of Montana, was described.

== Description ==
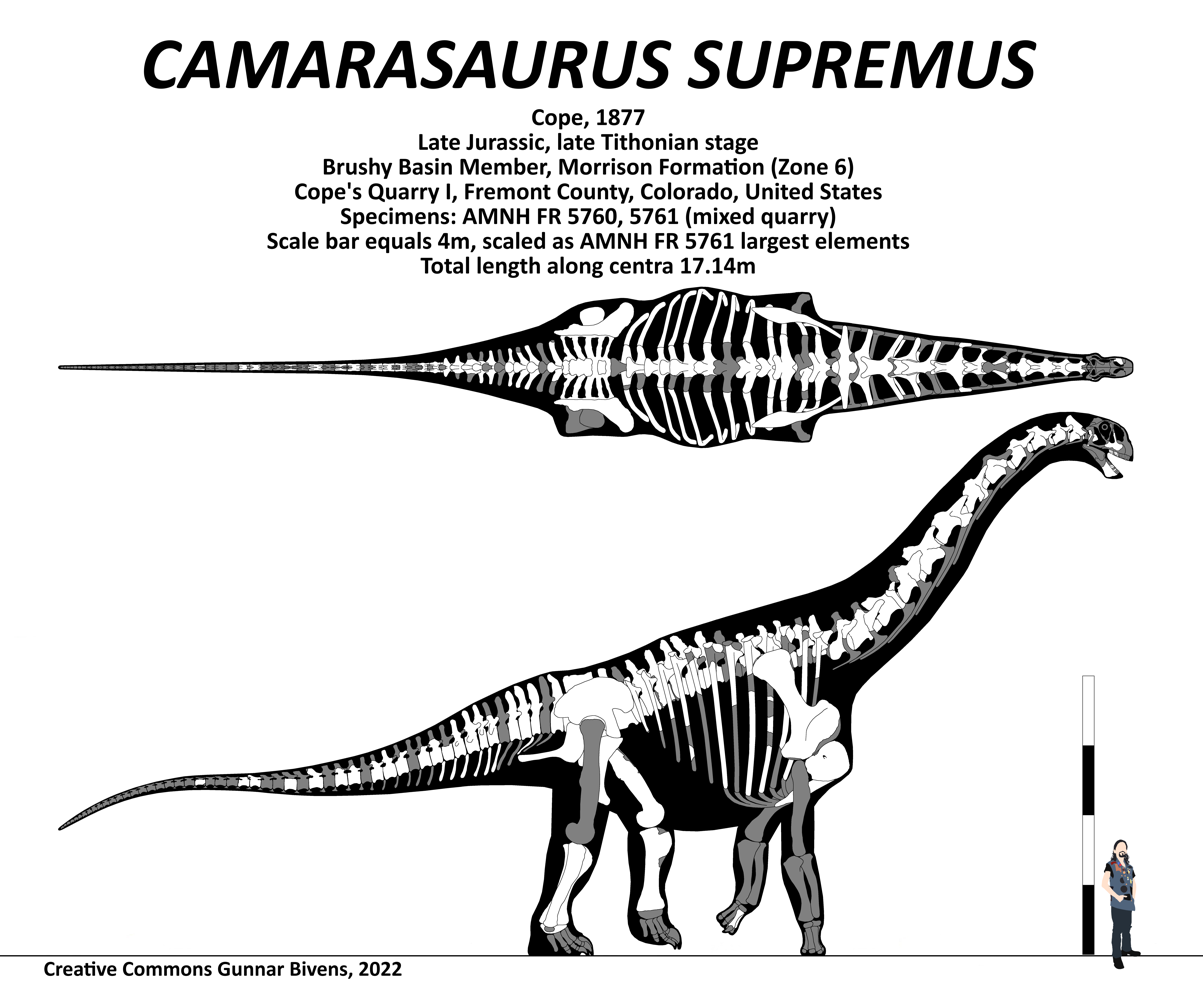
Skeletal reconstruction of C. supremus showing known elements in white

As a sauropod, Camarasaurus had an elephant-like body with a long neck ending in a proportionately small skull, and lightly built vertebrae of the trunk and neck that were in contrast to the massive, columnar limbs. Compared to other sauropods, it was relatively bulky with a wide ribcage. The neck and tail were comparatively short and the skull large. Due to its relatively long forelimbs, it was slightly taller at the shoulders than at the hips.

Camarasaurus was a medium to large-sized sauropod. The most common species, C. lentus, was about 15 m (49 ft) in length, and C. grandis and probably C. lewisi were comparable in size. The body weight of adult C. grandis has been estimated to be about 12.6 t (28,000 lb) on average, ranging from 8.3 t (18,000 lb) in the smallest to 16.6 t (37,000 lb) in the largest specimen. In 2020, John Foster stated that the latest species, C. supremus, had bones about 50% larger than those of the smaller species. Although C. supremus is too incompletely known to allow for precise size estimates, it would have reached almost 23 m (75 ft) in length and 42.3 t (93,000 lb) in weight if its body proportions were identical to those of the smaller species. Gregory S. Paul, in 2024, instead gave a length estimate of 18 m (59 ft) and a weight estimate of 24 t (53,000 lb) for this species.

=== Skull ===
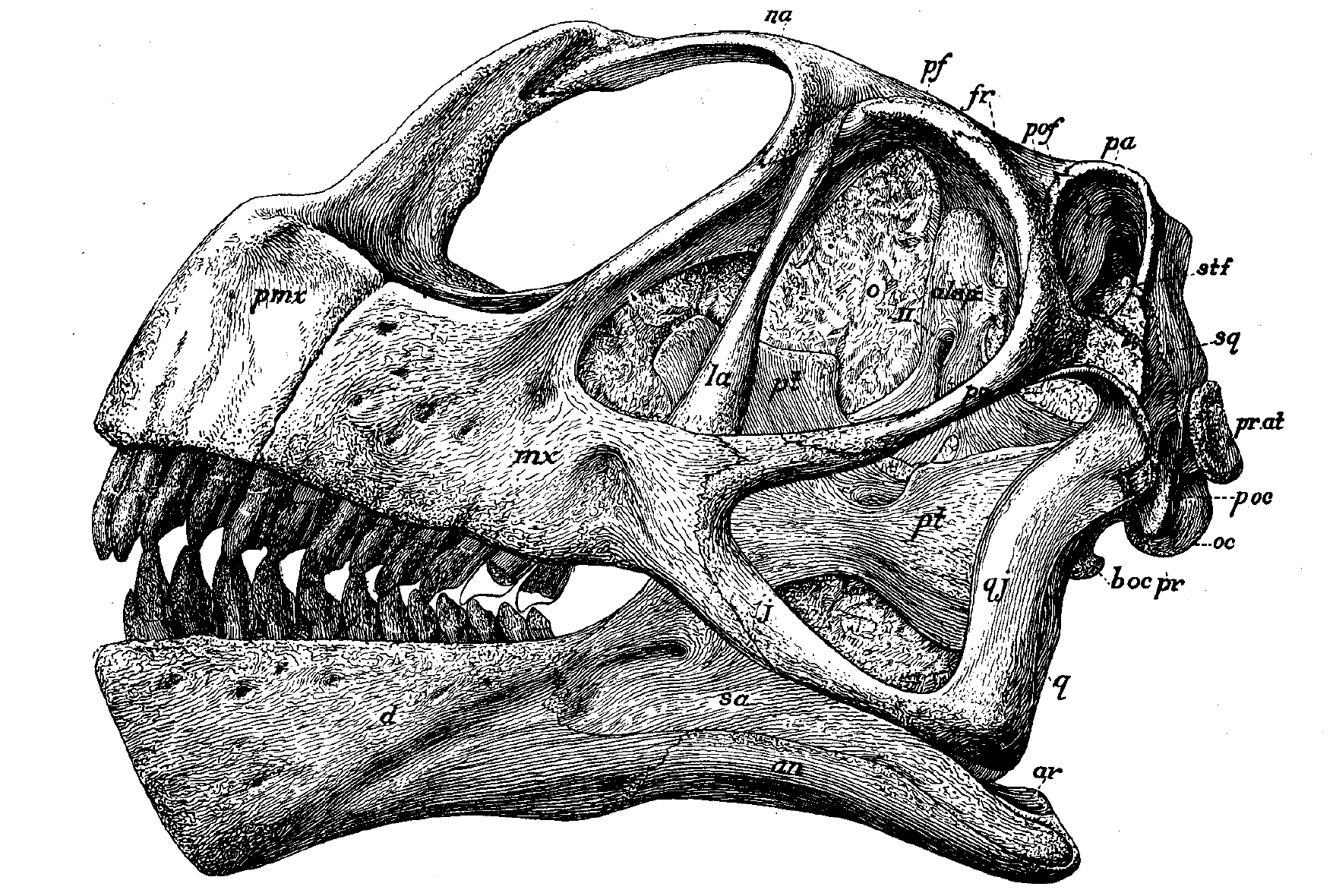
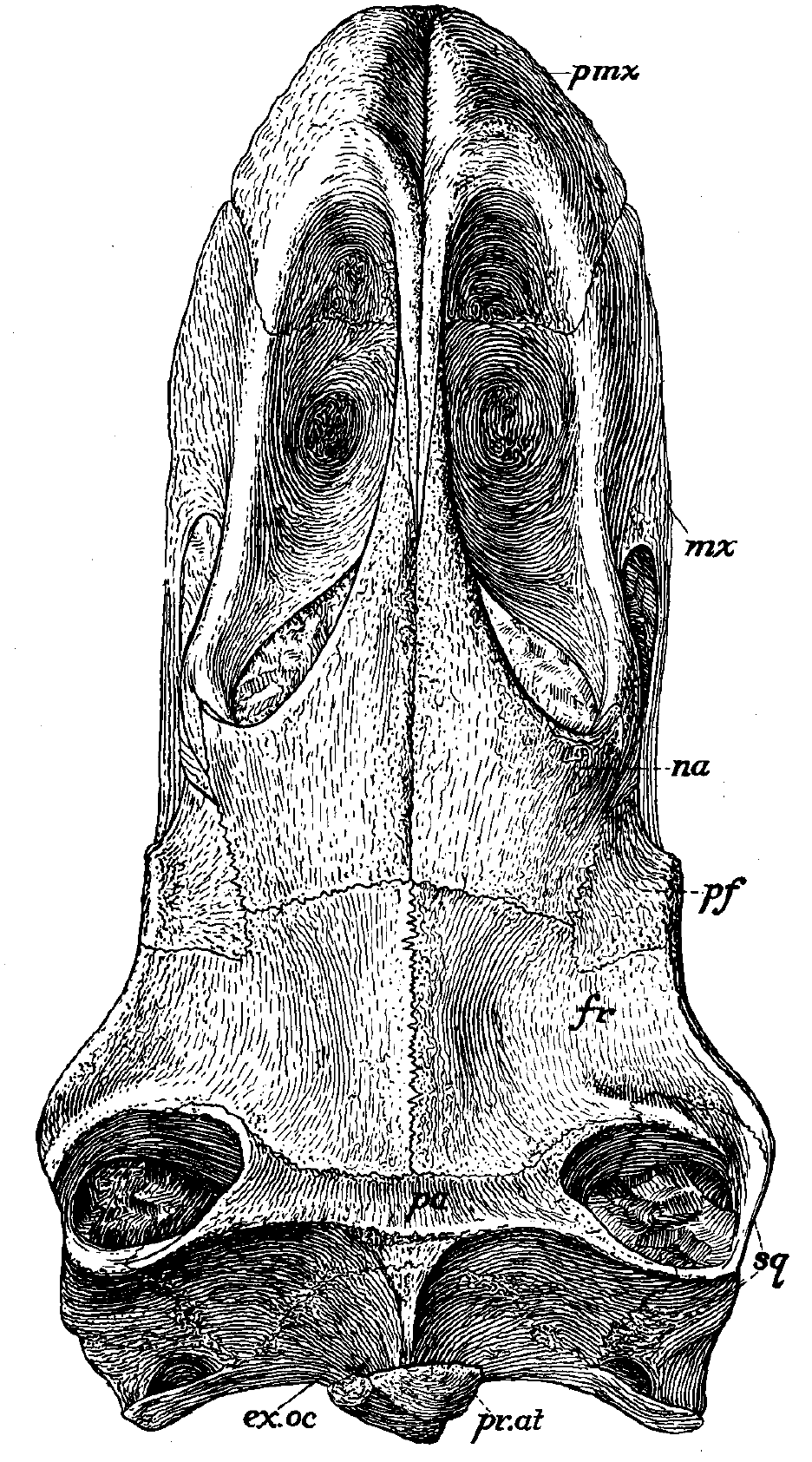
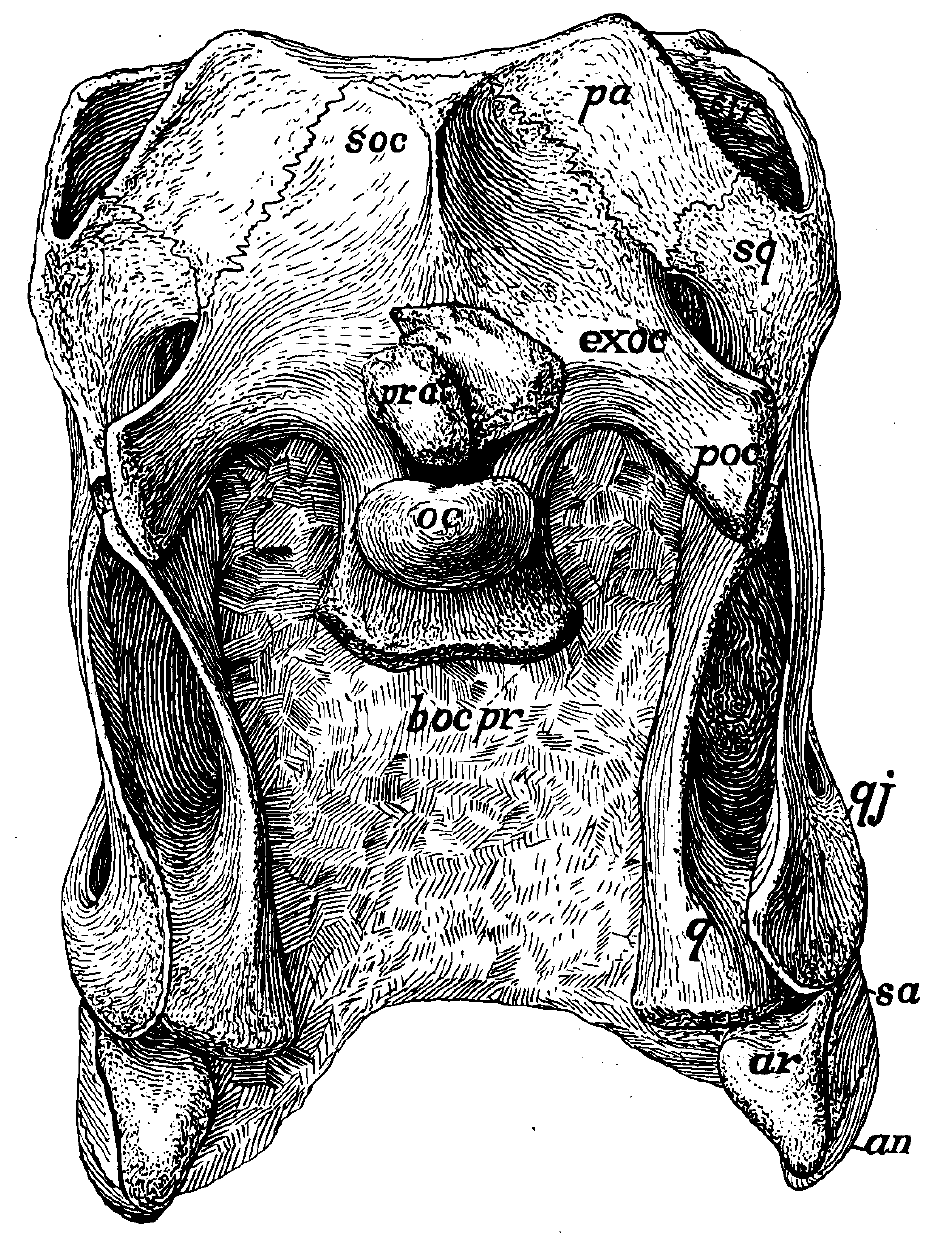
C. lentus skull (CM 11338) in side view (top), top view (bottom left), and rear view (bottom right)

The skull was larger and more strongly built than in other sauropods, with massive upper and lower jaws. Skull length varied between individuals, ranging from about 46% to 58% of the length of the femur (thigh bone). As in the contemporary Brachiosaurus, the external naris (nostril) was enlarged, resulting in an arched forehead. Both genera had a well-defined snout, but the skull of Camarasaurus was more rounded and short-faced. When viewed from above, the snout was rounded and slightly tapering, different to the rectangular snout of Diplodocus. The skull was almost rectangular when viewed from the back and higher than wide.

The largest openings that penetrated the skull were the external naris, the orbit (eye opening), and the infratemporal fenestra, which was located behind and below the orbit. These three openings were about the same size. The external naris was oval in shape, and the orbit was teardrop-shaped, tapering to a point at its lower end. In life, the fleshy nostril would have been located in front of the external naris rather than inside it. The orbit contained a scleral ring, a ring of small plate-like bones around the pupil of the eye. The infratemporal fenestra was roughly triangular and tilted backwards at an angle of 30°. A small and pear-shaped antorbital fenestra was present between the external naris and the orbit. Even smaller was the supratemporal fenestra, which was present in the rear corners of the skull roof and mostly facing upwards. This opening was oval in shape and obliquely oriented.

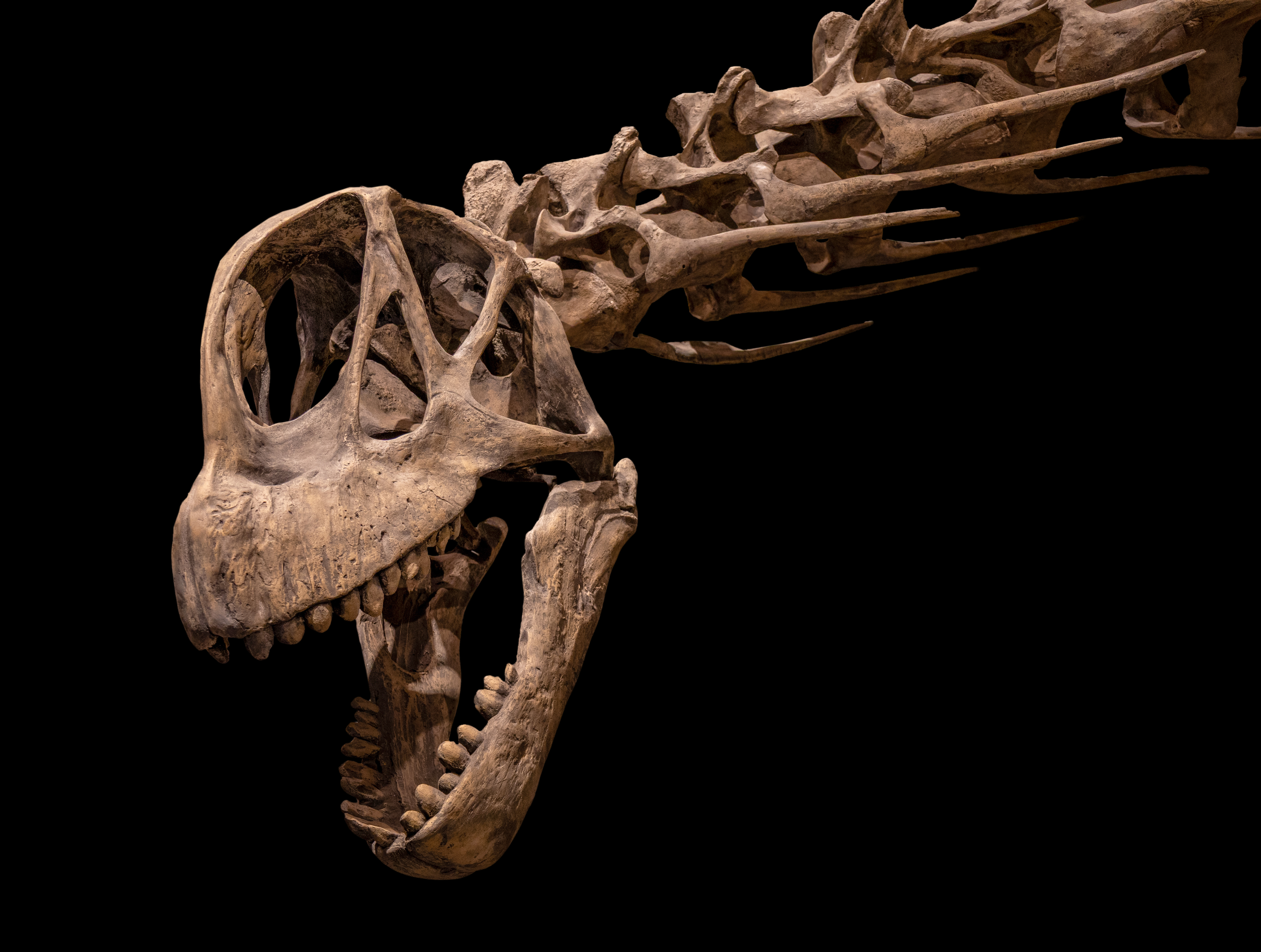
C. supremus skull at the Royal Tyrrell Museum showing, from left to right, the external naris, antorbital fenestra, orbit, and infratemporal fenestra

According to a 2004 review, the skull showed four autapomorphies (anatomical features not found in related genera): The lacrimal (the bone that formed the front margin of the orbit) was tilted forwards; the quadrate, a columnar bone at the rear of the skull, did not reach the infratemporal fenestra as its upwards-facing part was short; the quadratojugal bone, which formed the rear-bottom corner of the skull, reached upwards to make contact with the squamosal bone; and the side surface of the lower jaw had an oblique groove running from the surangular bone forwards and downwards to the lower margin of the dentary bone (the tooth-bearing bone of the lower jaw).

Specimens had four teeth in each premaxilla (the front bone of the upper jaw), 9 to 10 teeth in each maxilla (the main bone of the upper jaw), and 13 teeth in each lower jaw. The teeth were spoon-shaped and became longer and more symmetrical towards the tip of the snout. They were tilted forwards and bent slightly inwards. The front edges of the teeth were more curved than the rear edges, and the teeth in the lower jaw were straighter and slightly less robust than those of the upper jaw. This makes it possible to determine whether an isolated tooth came from the left or right side of the jaw and whether it came from the upper or lower jaw.

=== Postcranial skeleton ===
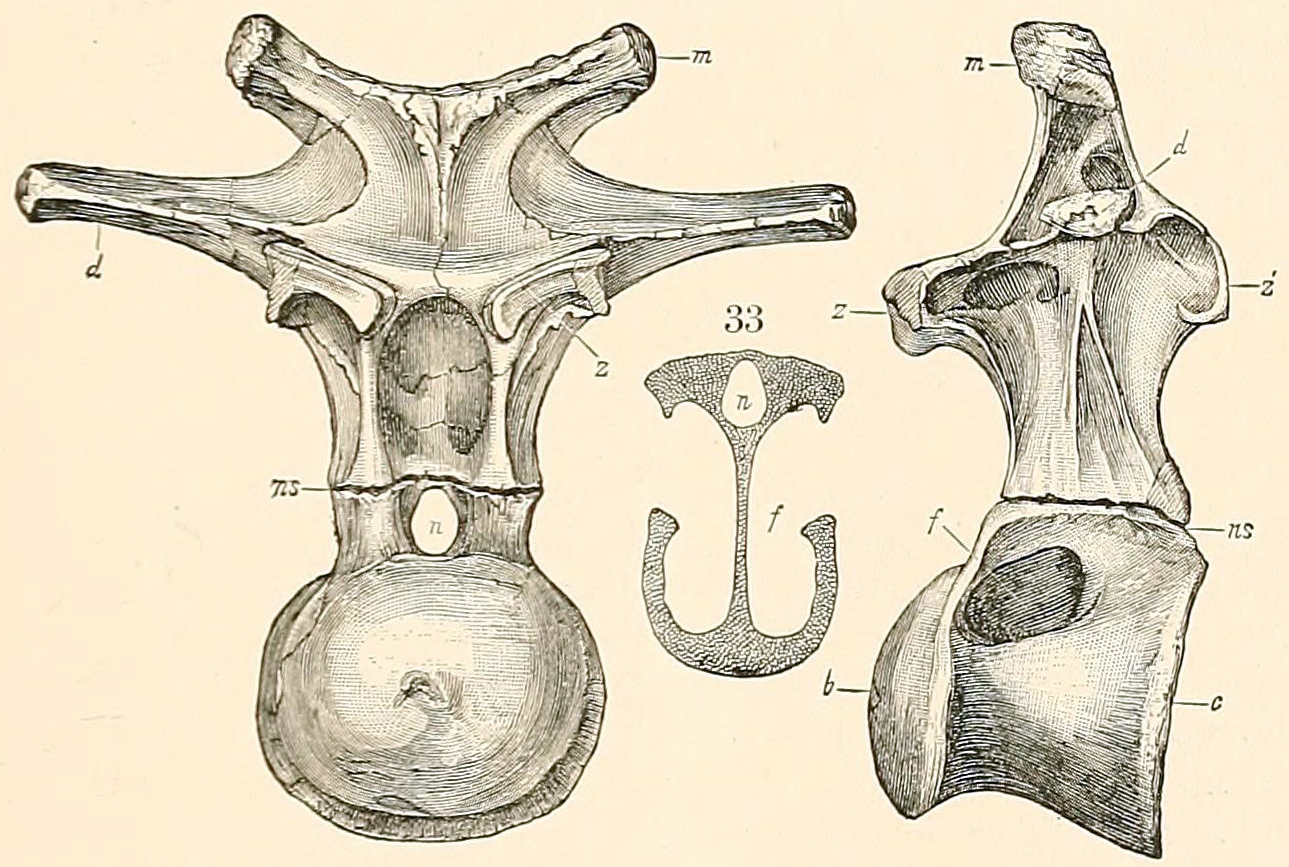
A dorsal vertebra of C. grandis, showing a bifurcated neural spine (labelled "m"). Center: A cross-section through the vertebral body, showing the internal chambers

The vertebral column consisted of 12 cervical (neck), 12 dorsal (back), and five sacral (hip) vertebrae. The two specimens that preserve a complete tail (CM 11338 and GMNH 101) each have 53 caudal vertebrae. Most of the volume of the dorsal and cervical vertebrae was made up by air sacs which were connected to the lungs. These air sacs filled extensive excavations in the vertebrae that gave Camarasaurus its name ('chambered lizard'). The cervical and dorsal vertebrae were opisthocoelous (concave at the rear and convex at the front) and had large excavations on their sides called pleurocoels. The neural spines (the top parts of the vertebrae) of the shoulder region were bifurcated (forked), and the left and right halves formed a U-shape when viewed from the front or back. In the hip region, the neural spines were short, fan-shaped when viewed from the front or back, and not bifurcated. The neural spines of the second to fifth sacral were often fused together. The cervical vertebrae had very slender and elongated cervical ribs that overlapped multiple succeeding vertebrae.

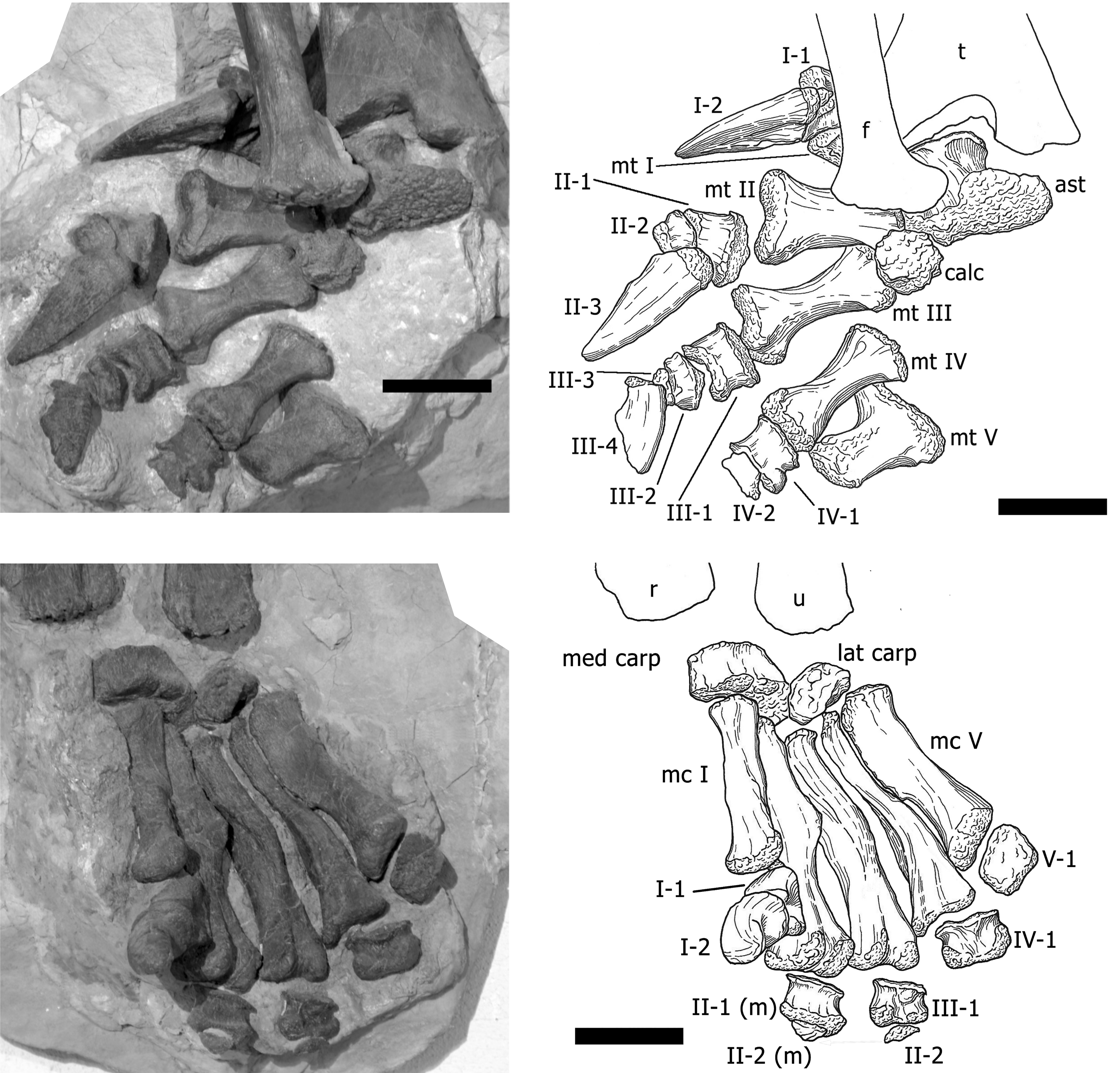
Left foot (top) and right hand (bottom) of the specimen "E.T."

The left and right halves of the shoulder girdle were probably connected at the front of the trunk by the coracoids (the lower shoulder bone). The upper end of the shoulder blade was expanded. In the hip, the pubis was massive, while the shaft of the ischium was slender, curved, and without an expanded end. The articulation surface between the pubis and ischium was long. The forelimb was slender, and the humerus was about 77% the length of the femur. In contrast, the hindlimb was massive, and the tibia (shin bone) was about 60% the length of the femur. Camarasaurus is one of few sauropods that preserve the wrist, which in this genus consisted of only two bones. (Note: Traditionally, the two wrist bones have been identified as the ulnare and the radiale, though this has been contested.) As in other macronarians, the five metacarpals were long, the third metacarpal reaching one third of the length of the humerus. As typical for sauropods, the metacarpals were vertical and arranged in a tube-like fashion. The fingers were strongly reduced, with the thumb consisting of two phalanges (finger bones), including a large, hook-shaped claw that was slanted sidewards. The remaining digits possibly consisted of one phalanx, and lacked claws. In the ankle, the calcaneum was small and rounded. As in other sauropods, the hind foot had five digits, consisting of 2, 3, 4, 2, and 1 phalanx, respectively. The first three toes had recurved claws that were strongly flattened side-to-side.

=== Soft tissue ===
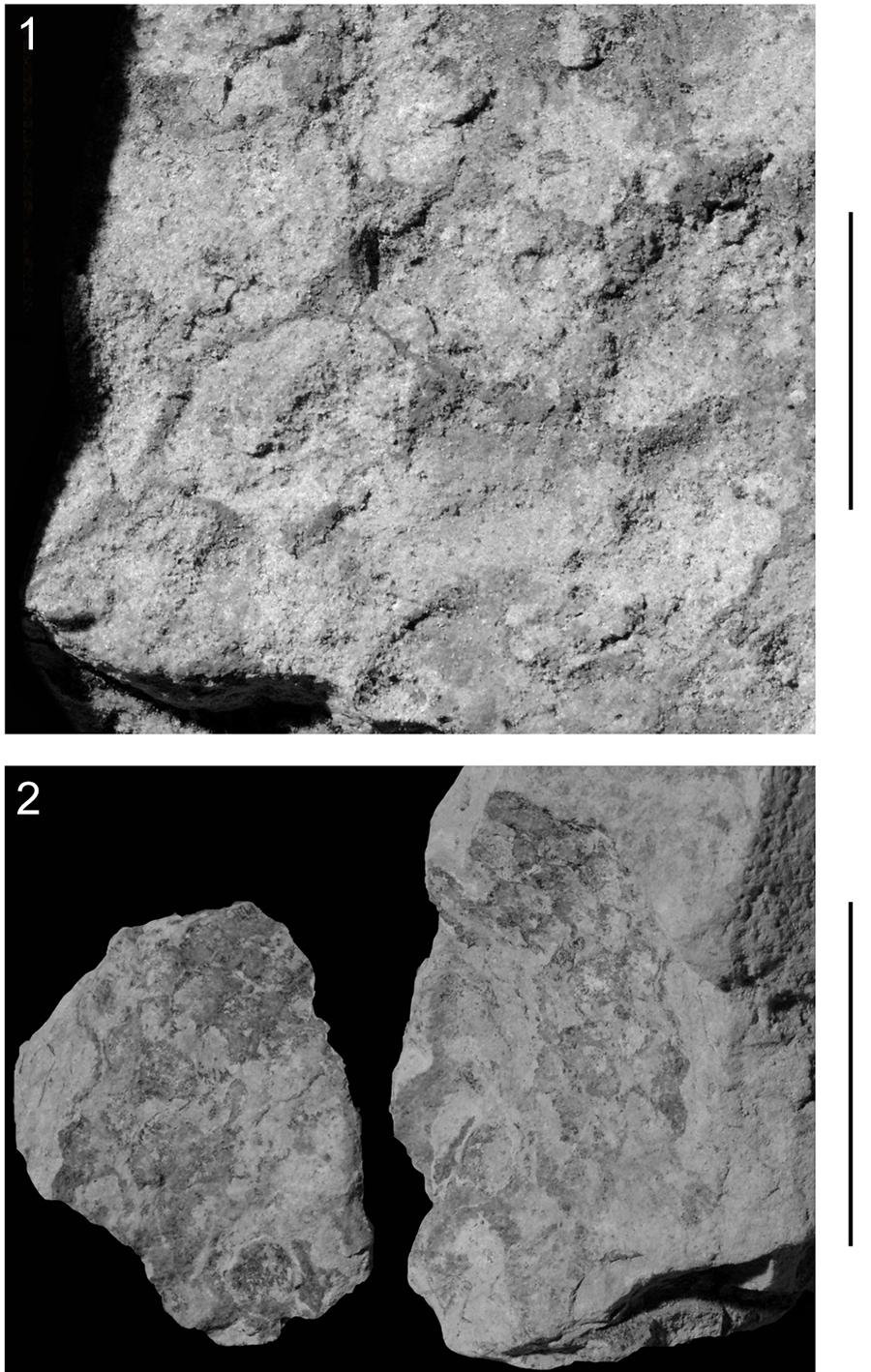
Skin impressions of "E.T."

Footprints show that the hind feet of sauropods were supported by a large, fleshy pad akin to that of elephants. Such a fleshy pad was absent in the forefoot, as shown by skin impressions preserved close to the palmar (rear) surface of the metacarpals of the Camarasaurus specimen "E.T.". The skin impressions also indicate that the second to fourth fingers of the forefoot were wrapped together in tissue. Patches of skin impressions are also preserved on the hind limbs of "E.T.", where they mostly show hexagonal scales that were between 6 and 18 mm (0.24 and 0.71 in) in diameter.

== Classification and species ==
In 1877, Cope described Camarasaurus as a new genus of dinosaur, and compared it with several genera that would later be classified as sauropods, including Cetiosaurus, Bothriospondylus, and Ornithopsis. One year later, with the description of Amphicoelias, Cope named the families Camarasauridae and Amphicoeliidae, the former showing opisthocoelous vertebrae (vertebrae that are concave at the back) and the latter showing amphicoelous vertebrae (vertebrae that are concave on both ends). Also in 1877, Marsh named the genus Morosaurus, which he placed in the Atlantosauridae, together with his genera Atlantosaurus and Apatosaurus. Later in the same year, Marsh named the new suborder Sauropoda, with Atlantosauridae as its only family, because "they differ so widely from typical Dinosauria". Marsh later classified Morosaurus in a sauropod family of its own, Morosauridae. Morosaurus and Morosauridae have since been synonymized with Camarasaurus and Camarasauridae, respectively, as the latter names were published earlier.

Hypothetical life restoration of Camarasaurus

Camarasauridae has historically been in wide use. For example, in a 1990 review, McIntosh recognized two subfamilies within the family: Camarasaurinae, containing Camarasaurus, Aragosaurus, Euhelopus, and Tienshanosaurus, and Opisthocoelicaudiinae, containing Opisthocoelicaudia and Chondrosteosaurus. Most of these genera were later found to belong to other groups, and the family is now often restricted to Camarasaurus itself, leading some researchers to reject it as redundant.

Since 1998, Camarasaurus is generally classified as a basal (early diverging) member of the sauropod group Macronaria. Within Macronaria, Camarasaurus is placed outside of the group Titanosauriformes, which comprises the majority of genera. In 1997, Leonardo Salgado and colleagues proposed the name Camarasauromorpha, which united Camarasaurus and Titanosauriformes. Several studies used both Macronaria and Camarasauromorpha, the latter excluding some very basal members of Macronaria. Camarasauromorpha has not been widely accepted.

Below is a simplified cladogram from Pedro Mocho and colleagues (2014), which recovered Camarasauridae as including Camarasaurus, Tehuelchesaurus, and Lourinhasaurus, three genera of Late Jurassic sauropods:

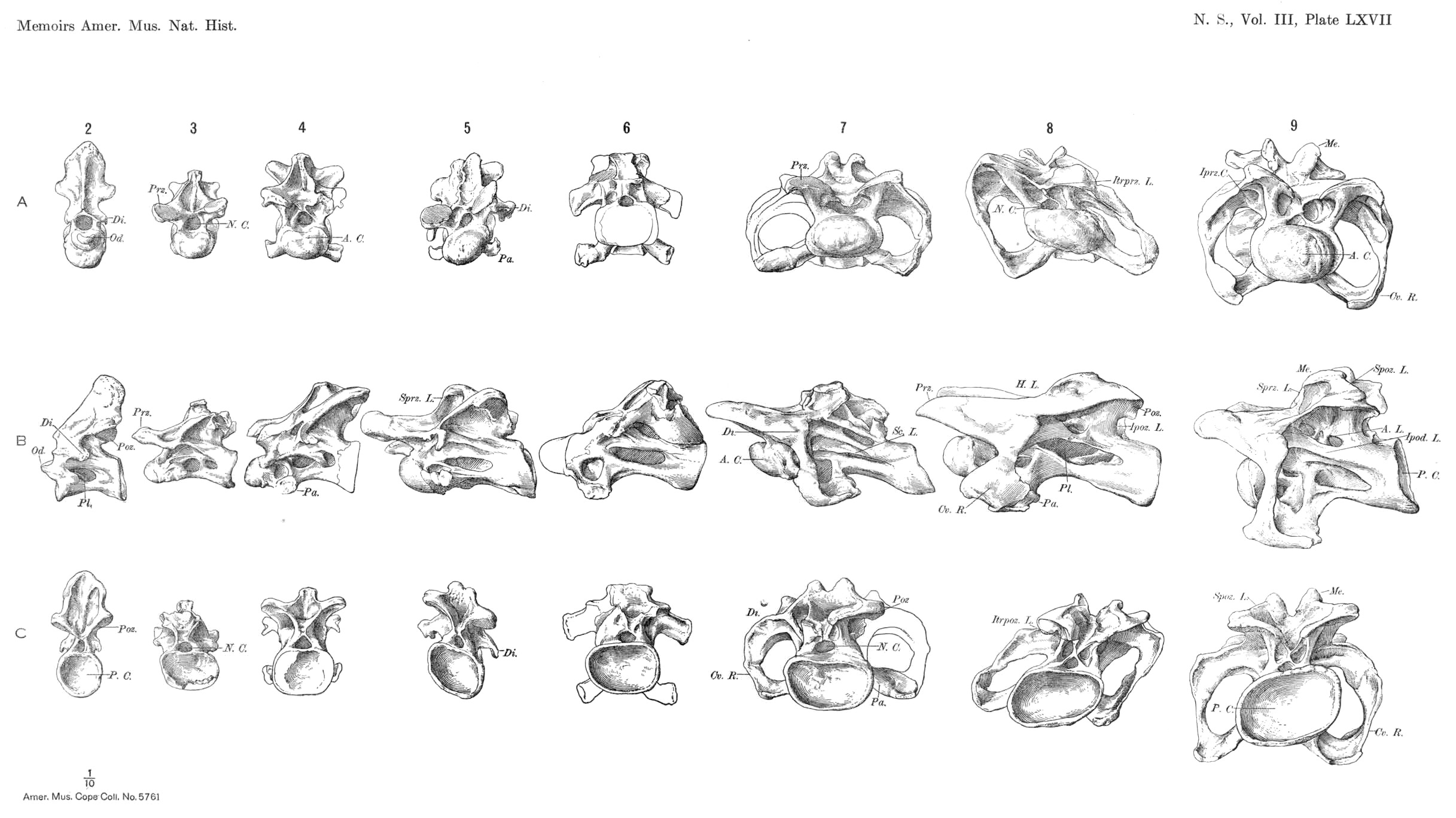
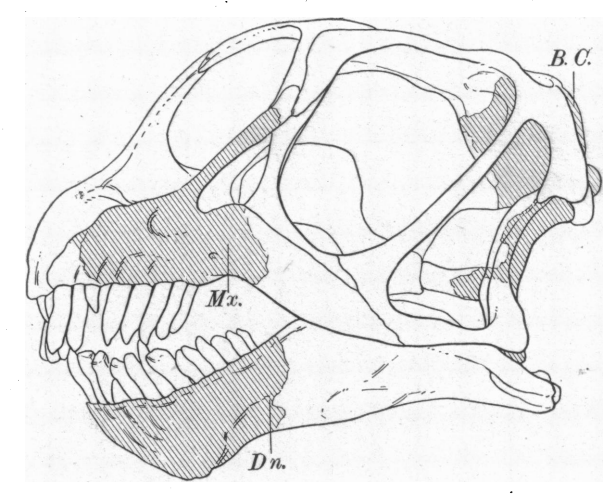
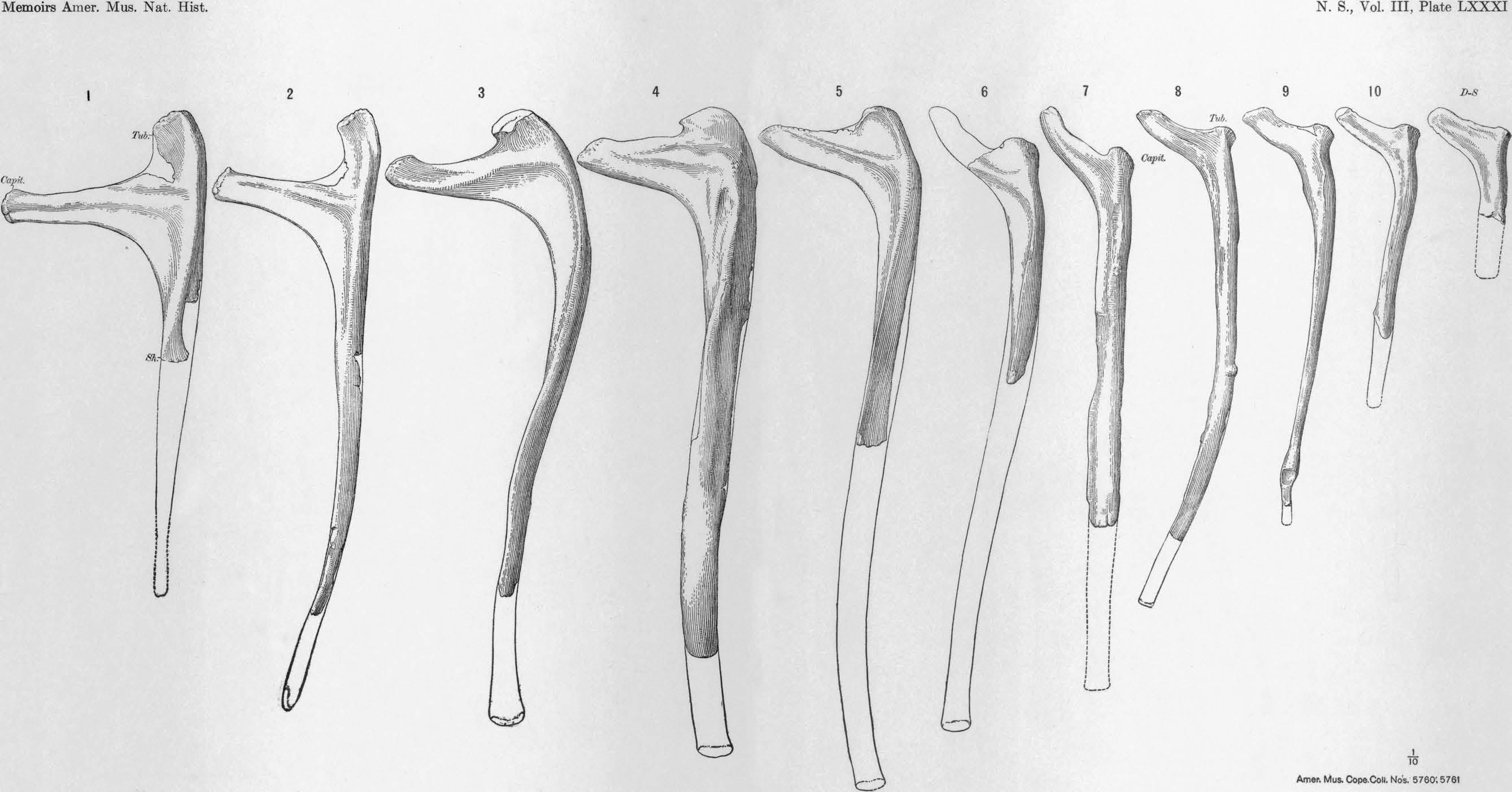
Neck vertebrae, a skull reconstruction, and ribs, collected by the Lucas brothers at Garden Park. These are part of the topotype of C. supremus.

- Neosauropoda
  - Jobaria
  - Haplocanthosaurus
  - Diplodocoidea
  - Macronaria
    - Camarasauridae
      - Tehuelchesaurus
      - Lourinhasaurus
      - Camarasaurus
    - Titanosauriformes
      - Giraffatitan
      - - Phuwiangosaurus
        - Euhelopus
        - - Venenosaurus
          - Cedarosaurus
          - Tastavinsaurus
        - Titanosauria

=== Currently recognized species ===
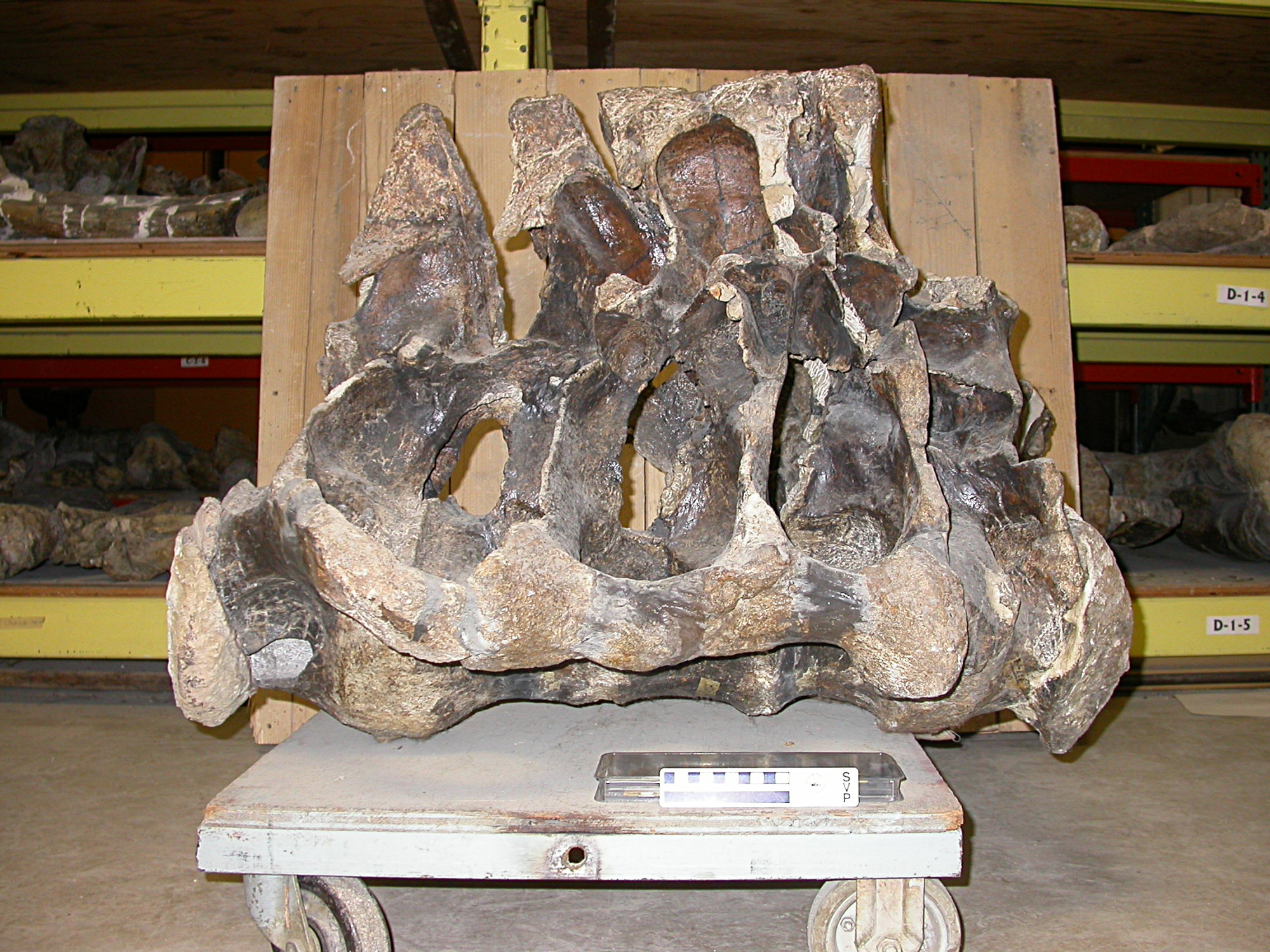
The sacrum of BYU 9047, the holotype specimen of C. lewisi

Four species are commonly recognized: C. supremus, C. grandis, C. lentus, and C. lewisi. C. supremus, named in 1877 by Cope, is the type species (the species the genus is based on). C. grandis was named in 1877 and C. lentus in 1889. C. lewisi was originally described as a distinct genus, Cathetosaurus, in 1988, but reclassified as a species of Camarasaurus in 1996. In 2007, Michael P. Taylor and Darren Naish suggested that Camarasaurus might contain several distinct genera, and some researchers suggested that Cathetosaurus should be reinstated as a distinct genus. At the same time, it is unclear whether or not all of the four species are distinct. In 2005, Takehito Ikejiri found that C. supremus is probably distinct from C. lentus and C. grandis, as it is 20% larger than adult individuals of the former two species. However, he also noted that the holotype specimen of C. lentus is a juvenile specimen and therefore does not show diagnostic features. Since this specimen was found in Como Bluff, from which C. grandis is known, it might be another example of the latter species. Ikejiri also argued that C. lewisi might be a synonym of C. grandis or C. lentus. In 2021, Cary Woodruff and colleagues stated that Camarasaurus is "in desperate need of revision".

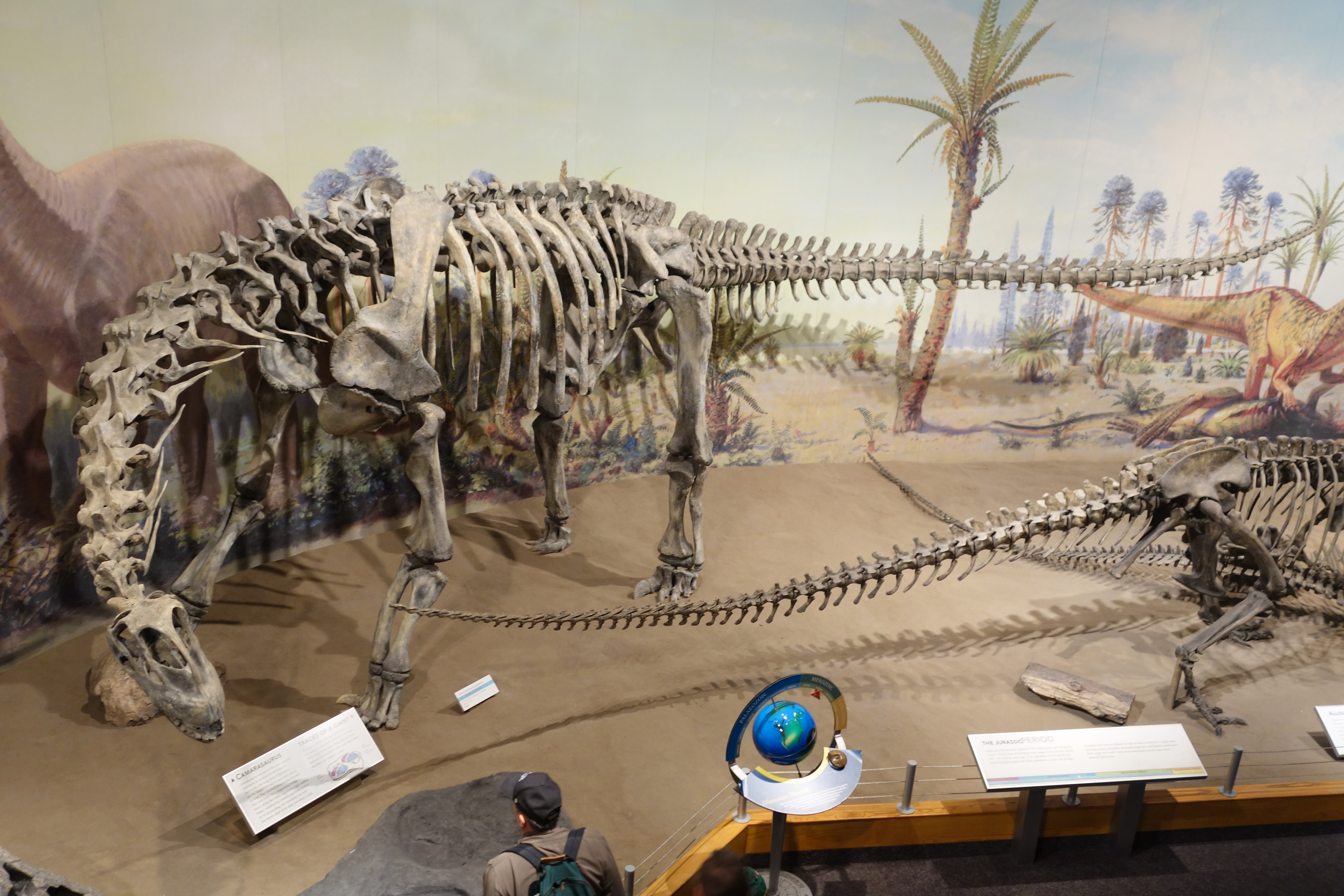
Skeletal mount of C. supremus (TMP 1984.161.0008) at the Royal Tyrell Museum

Most Camarasaurus specimens cannot be assigned to any particular species; species identification is complicated due to within-species variation and the often imprecise relative dating of localities. The two most common species, C. grandis and C. lentus, can be distinguished based on the neural arches of the frontmost dorsal vertebrae, which are wider in C. lentus, and the tips of the neural spines of the frontmost caudal vertebrae, which are broader in C. grandis. C. supremus shows wide neural arches as C. lentus but broad neural spine tips as C. grandis; this species is also substantially larger. In C. lewisi, the bifurcation of the neural spines was not restricted to the shoulder region but occurred from the third cervical to the twelfth dorsal vertebra.

In his 2005 study, Ikejiri argued that the four established species are separated in time. The oldest species, C. grandis, would have occurred during the Kimmeridgian and was followed by C. lentus in the late Kimmeridgian. C. supremus would have primarily occurred during the Tithonian, at the very top of the Morrison Formation. In 2017, Woodruff and Foster cautioned that the relative dating of the different localities within the Morrison Formation is still uncertain, which could undermine this proposed succession of species. There may also be some geographical separation between species, and C. supremus appears to have been restricted to the eastern part of the Morrison Formation in southern Colorado and western Oklahoma. Foster noted in 2020 that there is no clear distribution pattern of the different species.

=== Previously recognized species and synonyms ===
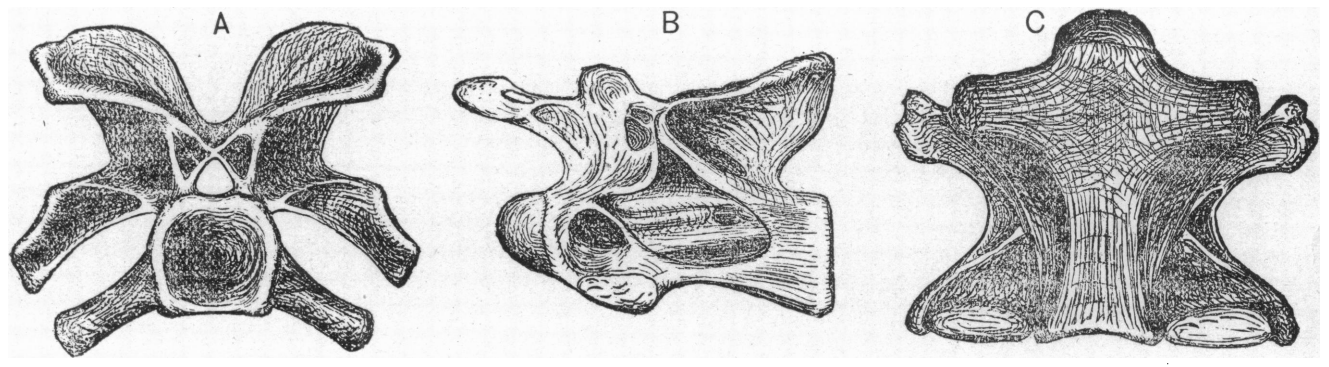
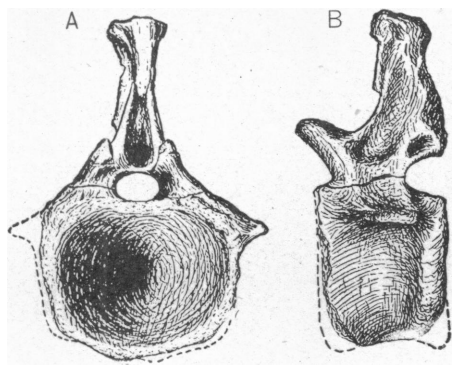
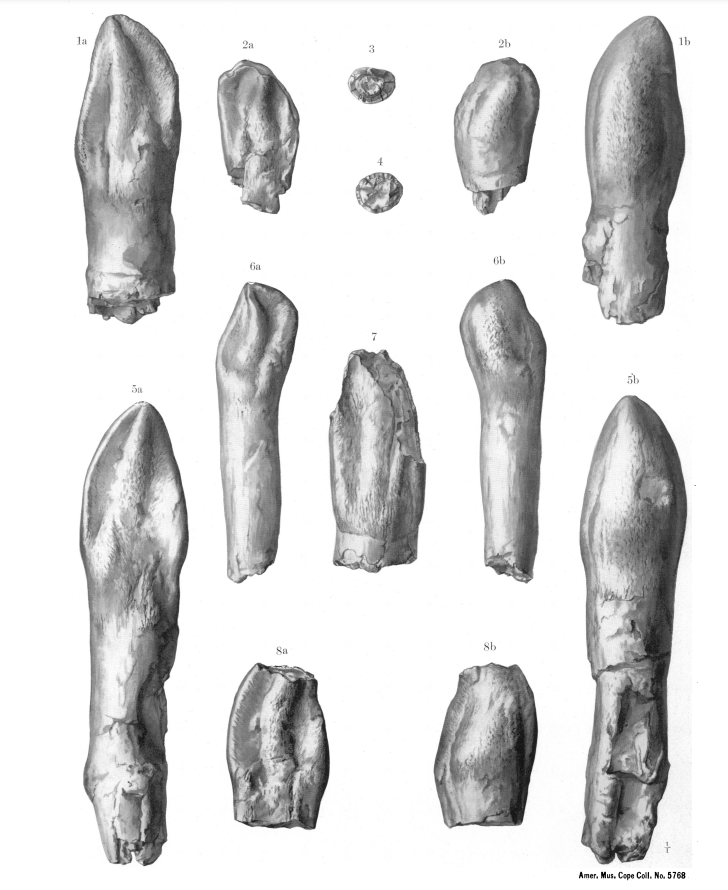
Fossils of Camarasaurus leptodirus, Amphicoelias latus, and Caulodon diversidens; synonyms of C. supremus

Four other species named by Cope between 1877 and 1879 are now considered to be synonyms of Camarasaurus supremus: Amphicoelias latus, Caulodon diversidens, Caulodon leptoganus, and Camarasaurus leptodirus. Likewise, three species named by Marsh in 1878 and 1896 are considered synonyms of Camarasaurus grandis: Morosaurus impar, Morosaurus robustus, and Pleurocoelus montanus. Two species described from vertebrae found at Dinosaur National Monument, Uintasaurus douglassi and Camarasaurus annae, are now considered synonyms of Camarasaurus lentus.

Other species that were previously assigned to Camarasaurus have since been moved to other genera. Morosaurus agilis was named in 1889 by Marsh on the basis of a partial skull and three vertebrae, but was described as a new genus of dicraeosaurid under the name Smitanosaurus in 2020. Morosaurus marchei was named in 1897–98 by Henri Sauvage on the basis of a tooth and an incomplete tail vertebra found in the Alcobaça Formation of Lisbon, Portugal. The vertebra was later found to be of a theropod; the tooth is from an indeterminate macronarian sauropod. Apatosaurus alenquerensis was named in 1957 by Lapparent and Zbyszewski on the basis of a partial postcranial skeleton from the Lourinhã Formation in Lourinhã, Portugal. It was tentatively placed in Camarasaurus by McIntosh in 1990, but was granted a new genus in 1998, Lourinhasaurus.

== Paleobiology ==
=== Supposed semiaquatic habits ===
Both Cope and Marsh initially believed that sauropods were terrestrial animals. In 1877, Cope was certain that Camarasaurus "was capable of and accustomed to progression on land". In later publications, Cope assumed that sauropods were fully aquatic; Marsh interpreted them as semiaquatic, and his hypothesis soon became widely accepted. In 1898, Osborn wrote that "we can only conceive of the Camarasaur as a great wading and swimming quadruped […]". He argued that the large amount of cartilage in the limb joints was unsuited to support its body mass on land, and that the powerful tail would have allowed for rapid swimming but would have been useless on land. Osborn speculated that Camarasaurus could walk on the bottom of lakes and feed on both water and land plants using its flexible neck, and only left the water for reproduction. The hypothesis of a semiaquatic lifestyle was refuted in the 1970s, when paleontologists such as Robert T. Bakker and Walter Coombs showed that the skeleton was not adapted for swimming, and that the teeth of Camarasaurus and Pelorosaurus must have processed coarse vegetation rather than water plants, amongst other lines of evidence. Sauropods are now thought to have been entirely terrestrial.

=== Feeding ===
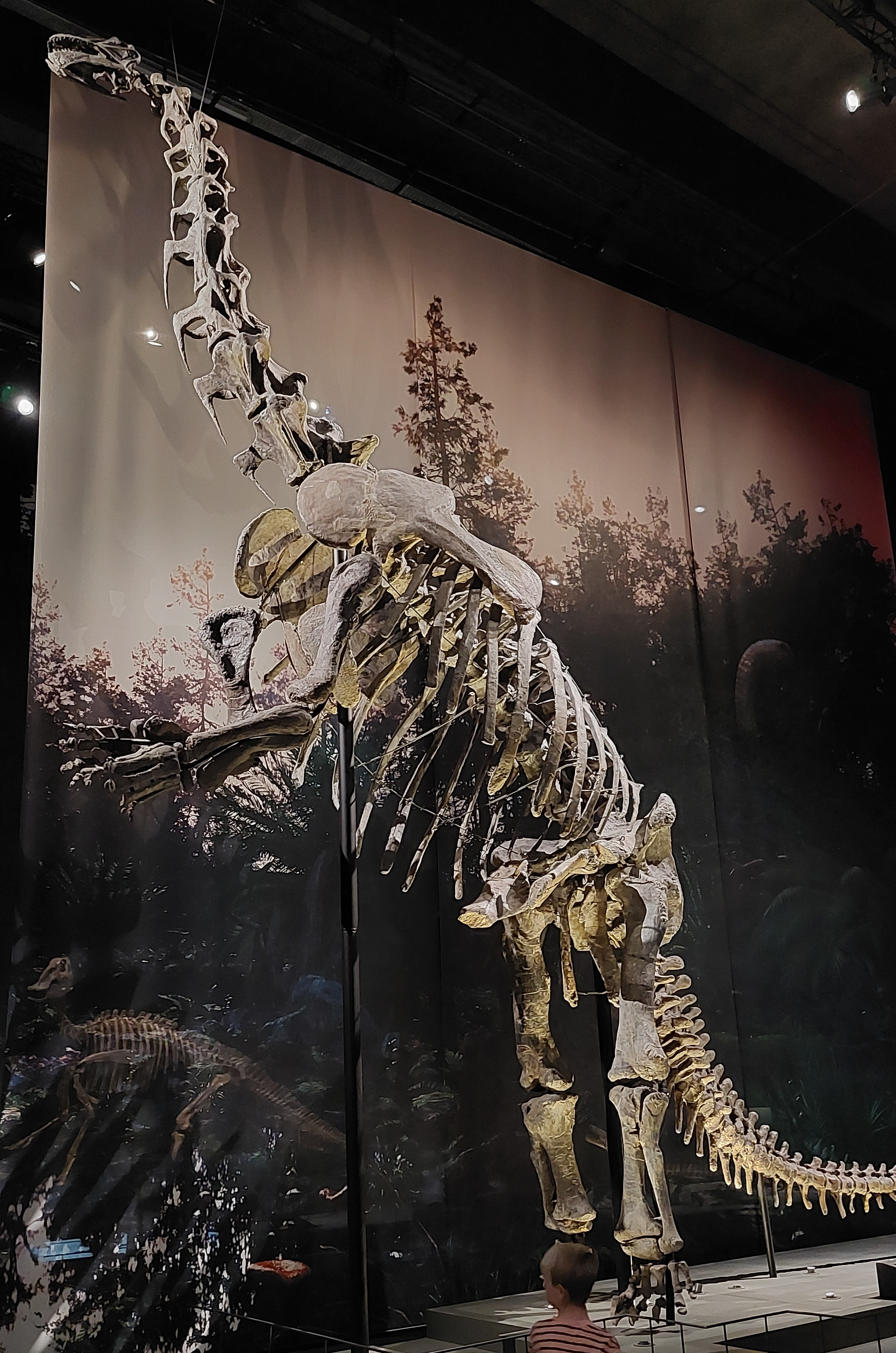
C. supremus skeleton at the Naturalis Biodiversity Center rearing on its hind legs

Camarasaurus was a herbivore that probably fed at moderate heights of 2 to 5 m (7 to 16 ft). It might have been able to rear on its hind legs to reach higher vegetation, as indicated by anatomical features such as the short neural spines of its caudal vertebrae. In 1998, Anthony Fiorillo concluded that adult Camarasaurus consumed coarser foods than the contemporary Diplodocus, as evidenced by microscopic pits and scratches on their teeth. Juvenile Camarasaurus, in contrast, appeared to have consumed the same soft foods as adult Diplodocus. Modern herbivorous mammals with rounded snouts are often selective feeders that feed on particular plants that are less abundant but nutritious; wide-snouted species are non-selective feeders that feed on less nutritious but abundant food in bulk. Based on this observation, John Whitlock argued in 2011 that the round-snouted Camarasaurus and Brachiosaurus were selective feeders whereas the square-snouted diplodocids and rebbachisaurids were bulk feeders. The diet of adult Camarasaurus might have consisted of the leaves of conifers, such as those of the extinct Cheirolepidiaceae, and ginkgos. In 2016, Mark Hallett and Matt Wedel suggested that female cones of araucarians as well as resins might have supplemented its diet. In a 2025 analysis of calcium isotope compositions of teeth, Norris and colleagues found that Camarasaurus had a more mixed and less specialized diet with a higher amount of woody tissues than Camptosaurus and Diplodocus.

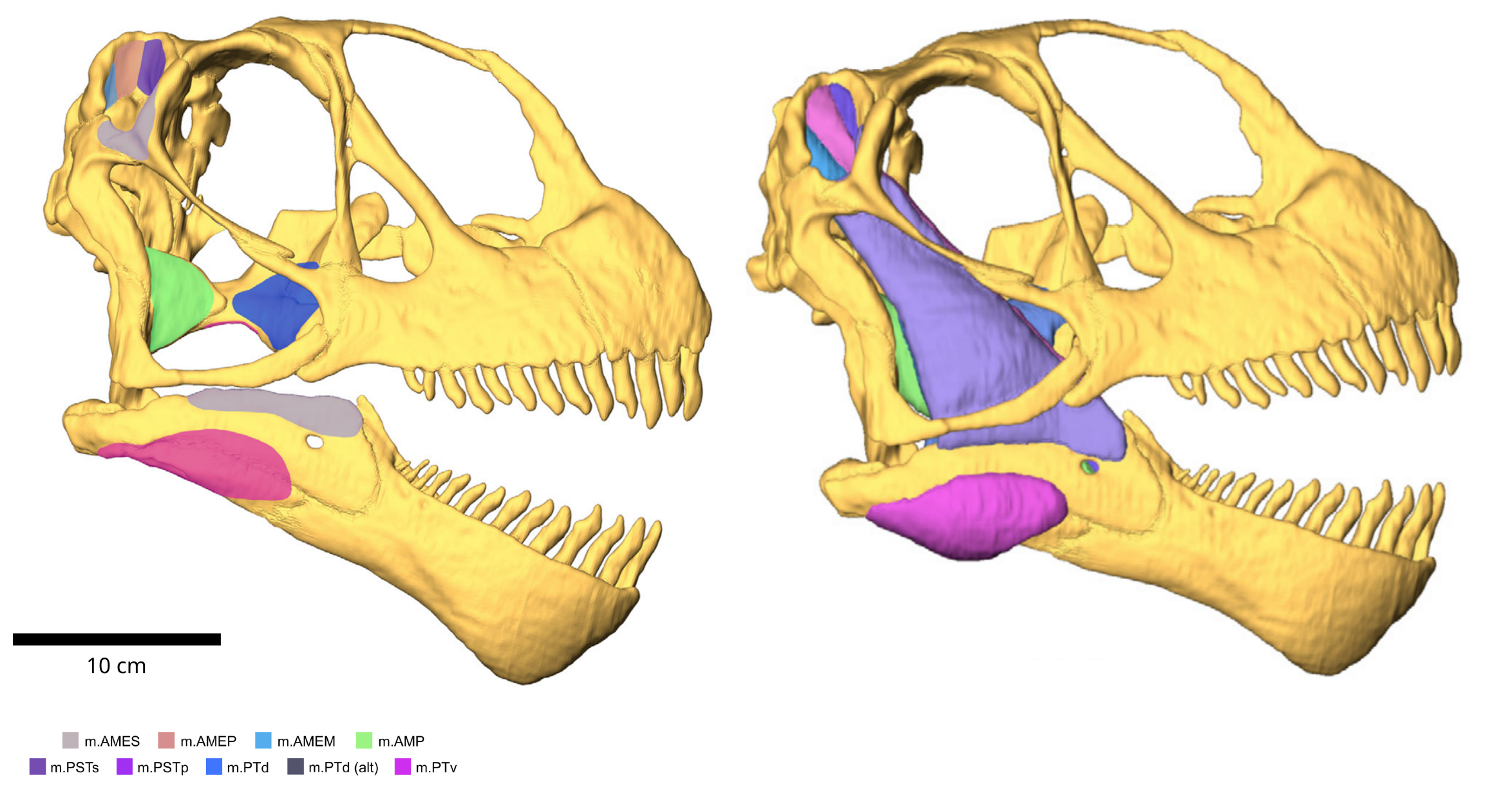
Jaw adductor musculature (muscles responsible for closing the mouth) of C. lentus. Origin and insertion surfaces for the muscles (left) and reconstructed muscles (right)

Camarasaurus probably had a more powerful bite than other sauropods due to the very large coronoid process (an upwards facing projection of the mandible) and the extensive attachment surfaces for large masticatory muscles (the external mandibular adductor muscles) in the supratemporal fenestra. A 2016 study by David Button and colleagues estimated that the bite force of Camarasaurus was almost four times higher than that of Diplodocus. The bite force was highest in the posterior portion of the tooth row, where it is estimated to have reached up to 1978 newtons. The sturdy construction of the skull also suggests that it was able to resist greater stresses during feeding than other sauropods. Per Christiansen, in a 2000 paper, suggested that Camarasaurus was adapted to biting off vegetation, but did not rake leaves as Diplodocus or Brachiosaurus did. The upper and lower teeth appeared to have fit into each other. In a 1994 study, Jorge Calvo suggested that Camarasaurus could crush food items against its teeth by moving its jaws back and forth, allowing some degree of food processing before swallowing.

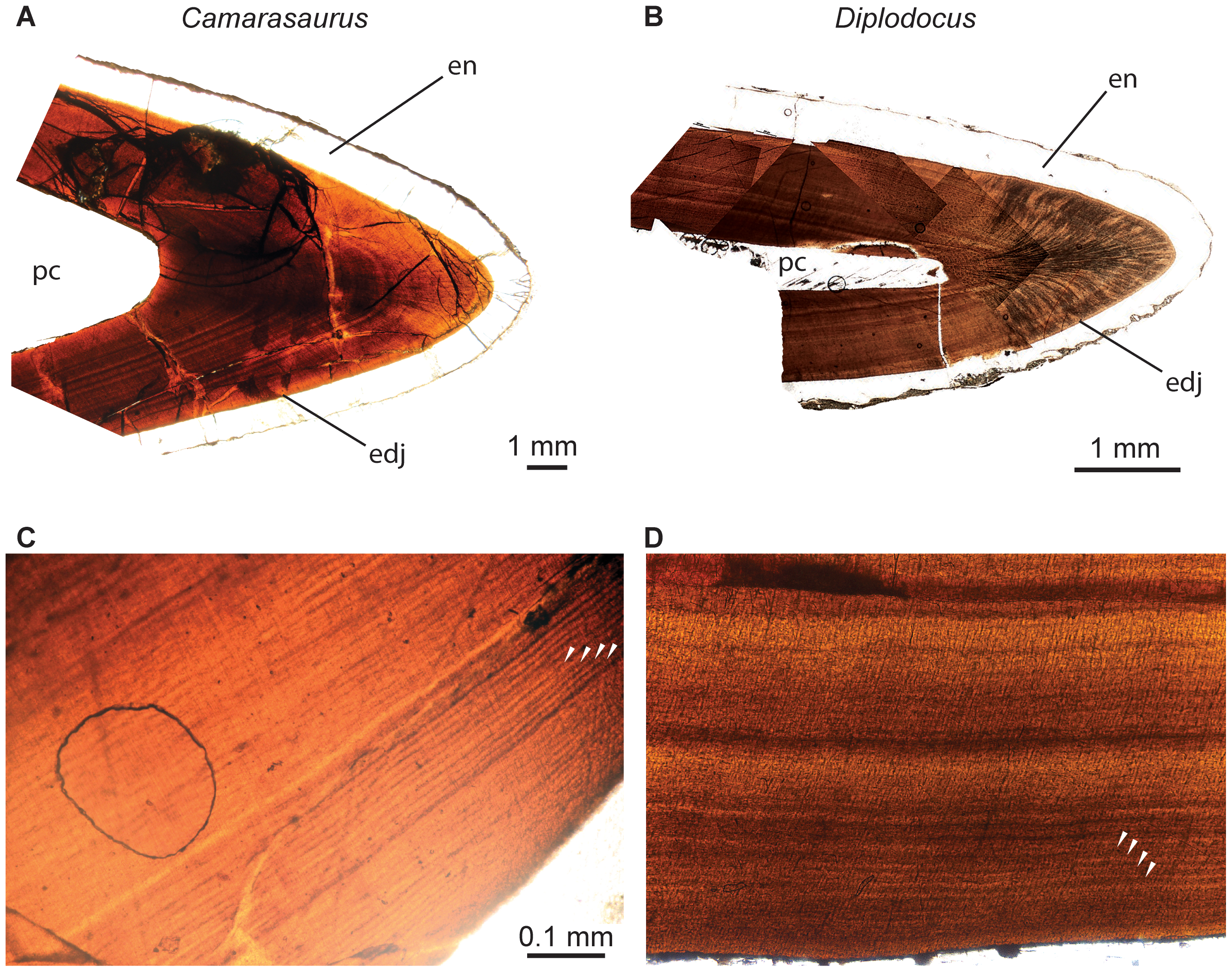
Thin sections of the teeth of Camarasaurus (left) and Diplodocus (right), with white arrows showing daily growth rings

As with other dinosaurs, Camarasaurus continuously replaced its teeth, and underneath each erupted tooth there were up to three replacement teeth. A tooth was replaced after 62 days on average, as indicated by daily growth rings called von Ebner lines that are visible in thin sections. This was slower than in Diplodocus, where a tooth only lasted for about 35 days, but as fast or faster than in ornithischian dinosaurs. In a 2017 study, Kayleigh Wiersma and Martin Sander described the impression of a patch of soft tissue that covers parts of the lower jaw and teeth of the specimen "E.T.". This impression appears to have been the animal's gums, indicating that the tooth crowns in sauropods were partly enclosed by gums. Such gums may have held the tooth row together even when the teeth of a carcass separated from the jaw, explaining why isolated tooth rows of sauropods are often found. The authors also suggested that the gums could have been covered by a horny beak, which could have helped with cutting vegetation while protecting the teeth. The presence of such a beak is consistent with the presence of small foramina (openings) and grooves on the outer surfaces of the jaws that would have contained blood vessels in life. Alternatively, these blood vessels could have supported "lips" like those found in today's lizards.

A juvenile and heavily scavenged Camarasaurus specimen from Wyoming was found with 14 polished quartz stones that are between 1 and 13 cm (0.39 and 5.12 in) in diameter and have been identified as gastroliths (stomach stones). Sauropods were once assumed to have swallowed such stones to help grind food in the stomach, but the rarity of skeletons preserving gastroliths and their low numbers suggest that they were instead swallowed accidentally or for mineral intake.

=== Posture and function of the neck ===
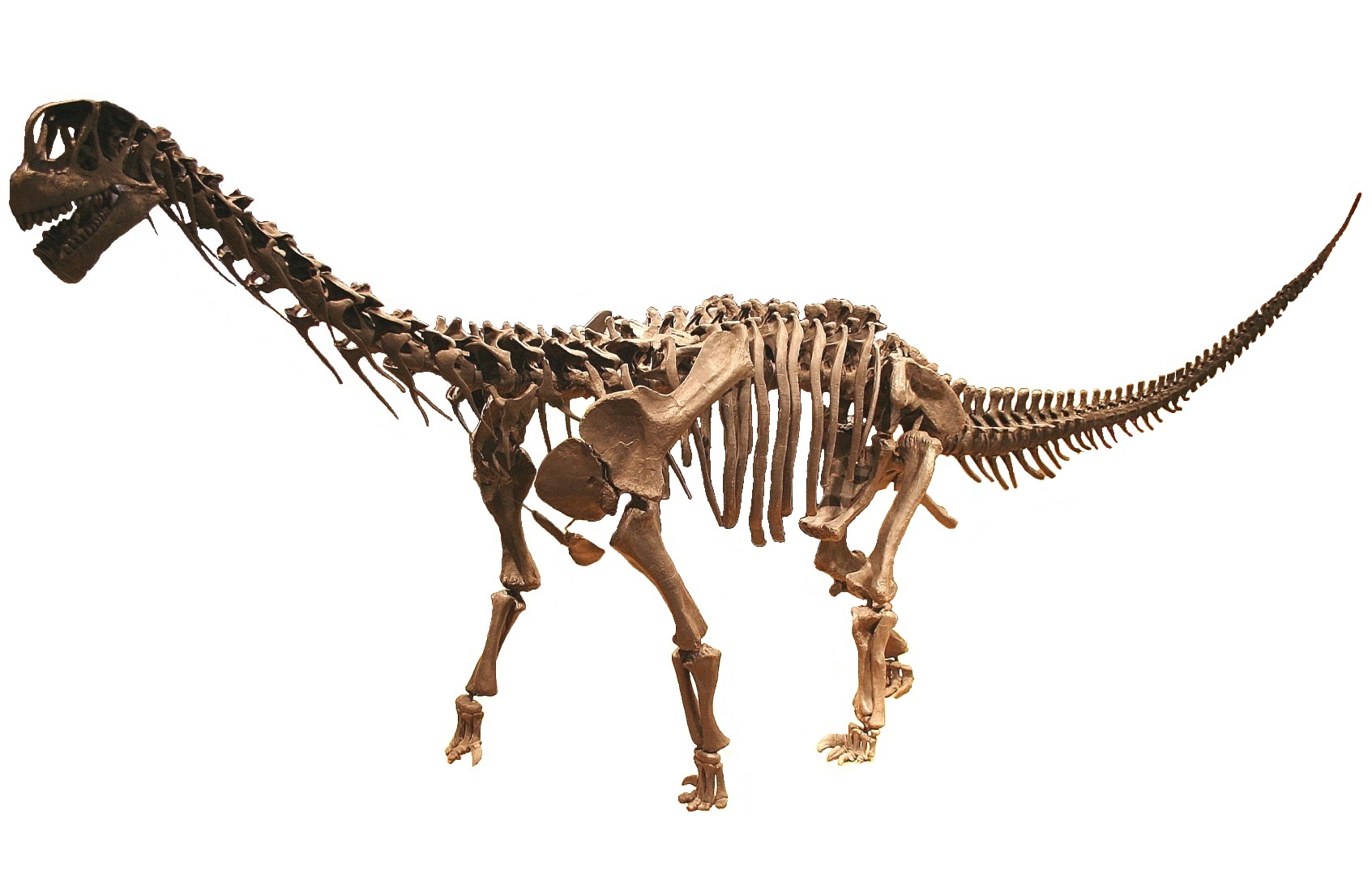
Skeletal mount at the Jurassic Museum of Asturias

The long necks of sauropods might have evolved for feeding on plants that were high above the ground or otherwise difficult to access, or to maximize the amount of food they could access without moving the body, thus saving energy. The probable neck posture has been the subject of controversy. A 1921 skeletal reconstruction of Camarasaurus by Osborn and Mook shows a rather straight and horizontal neck, although later depictions often showed a nearly vertical, swan-like neck. Some complete skeletons, such as the juvenile C. lentus specimen CM 11338, also show a vertical neck, but these represent opisthotonic death poses that do not necessarily reflect the original neck posture. In 1998, John Martin and colleagues argued that the necks of sauropods were held approximately horizontal, like a beam. They stated that the neck of Camarasaurus would have been powerful and inflexible, and that the elongated cervical ribs would have braced it along its underside. In 1999 and 2005, Kent Stevens and Michael Parrish analyzed how the neck vertebrae connected to each other in neutral pose, and concluded that the necks of Camarasaurus and other sauropods were typically held straight with a slight downwards slope.

The idea of a more-or-less horizontal neck was questioned by several subsequent studies. In 2005, David Berman and Bruce Rothschild used computed tomography (CT) data to propose that there were two types of sauropod neck vertebrae, a robust type and a slender type. Camarasaurus had the robust type, indicating that its neck was held vertical or almost vertical; the slender type suggests a horizontal neck posture. In 2009, Taylor and colleagues argued that modern animals usually hold their necks in an extended rather than neutral pose, causing the neck to curve upwards; the same was likely true for sauropods. In a 2007 study, Paul Sereno and colleagues suggested that the head of Camarasaurus was habitually inclined downwards by about 15°, based on the orientation of the semicircular canals in the inner ear, which housed the sense of balance. Taylor and colleagues argued that in this posture, the occipital condyle would have faced downwards, requiring that the front part of the neck was steep, and possibly close to vertical.

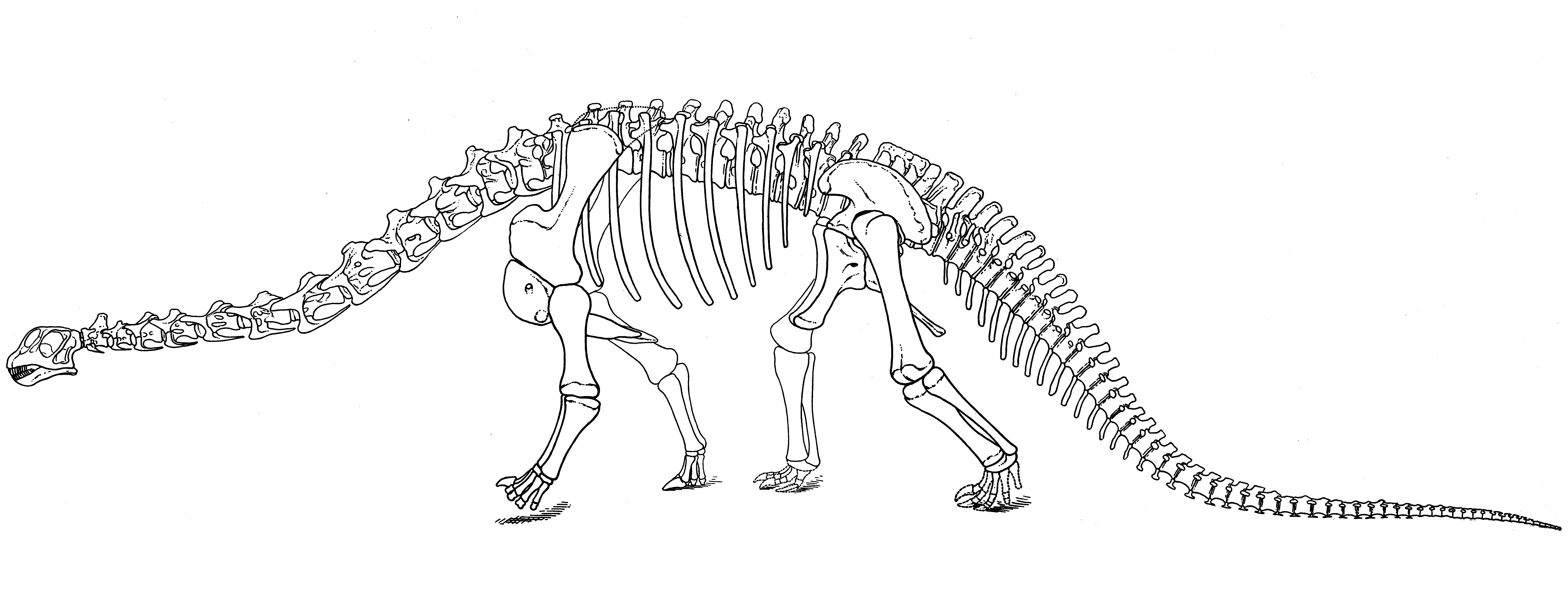
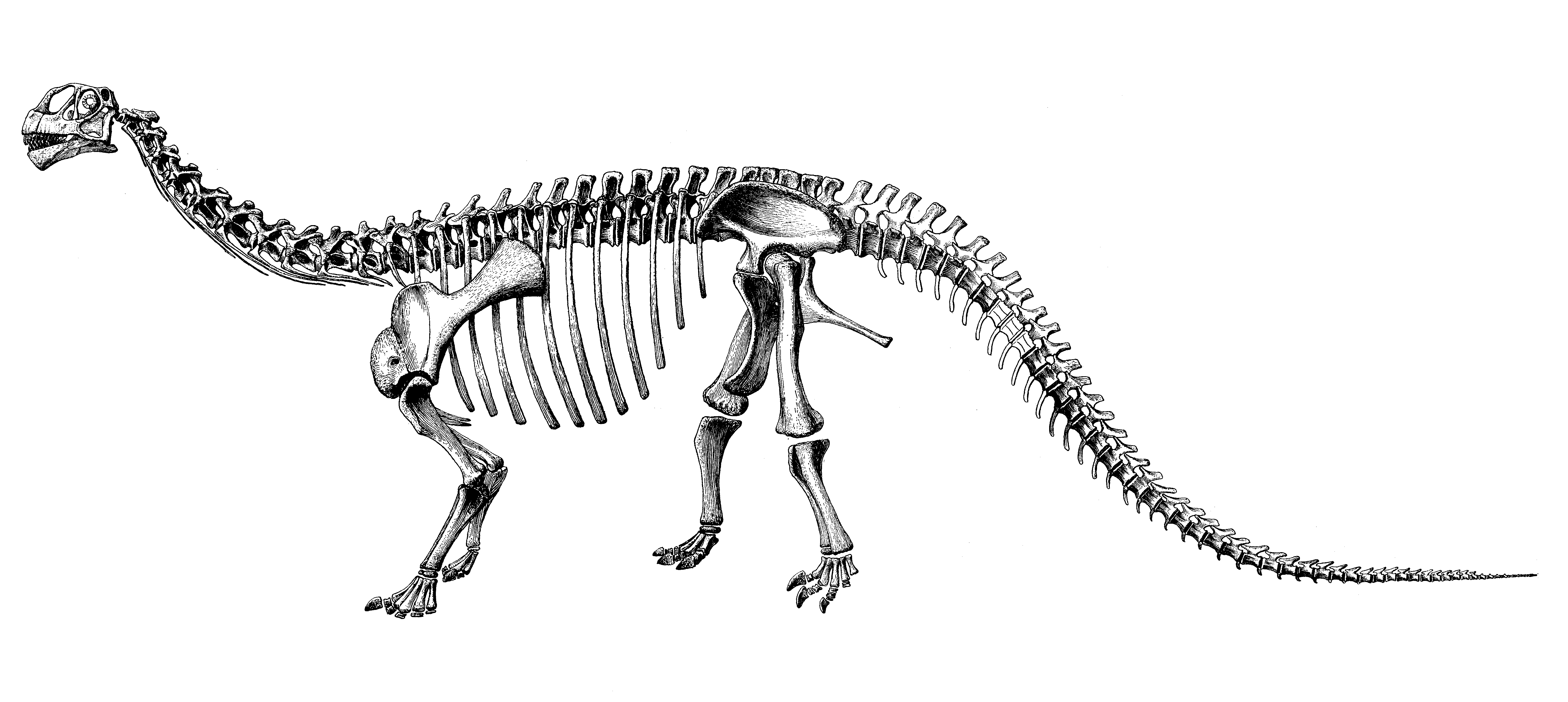
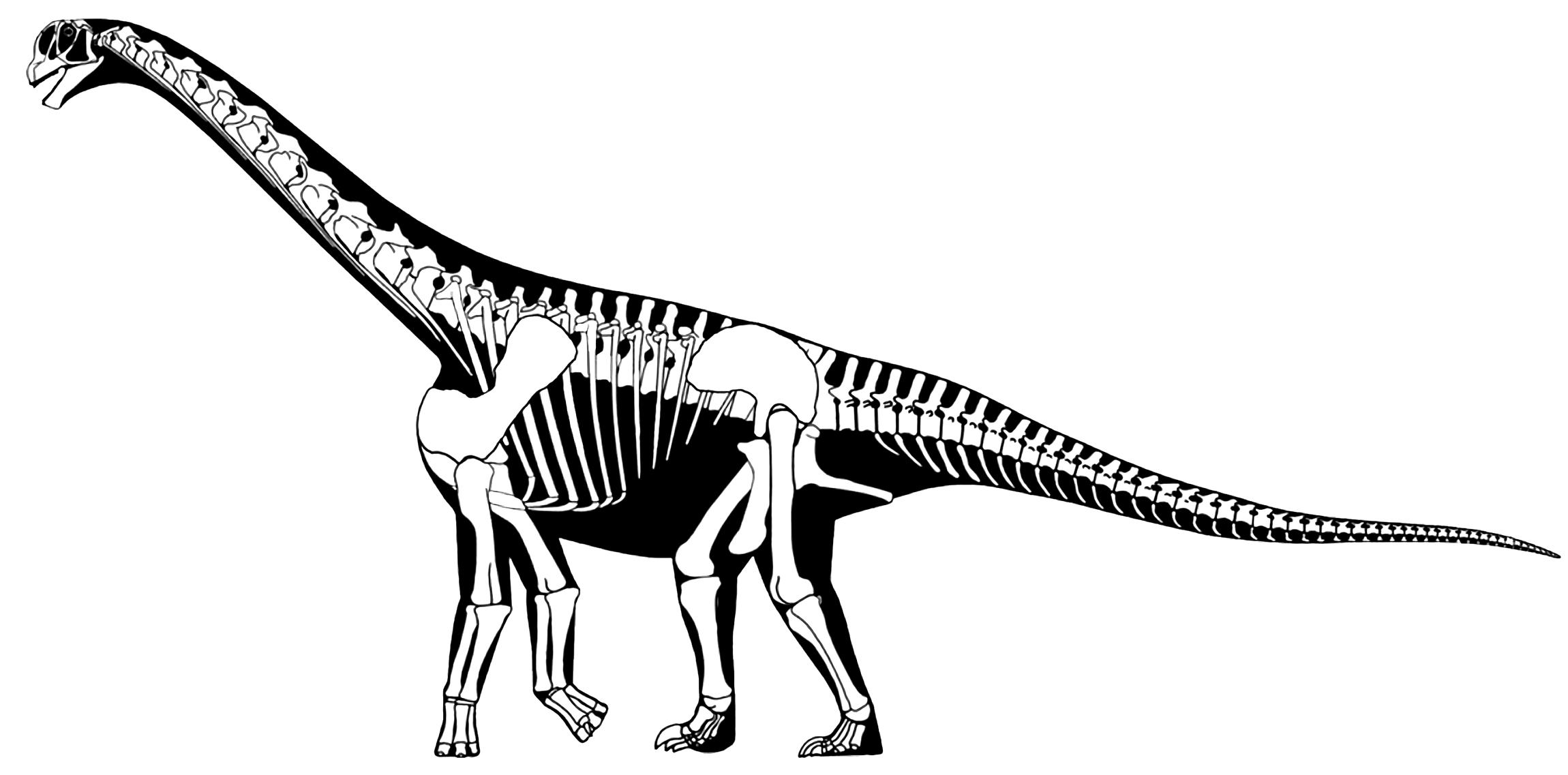
Historical reconstructions by Osborn and Mook, 1921 (top) and Gilmore, 1924 (middle), showing differences in the orientation of the shoulder blade and the sloping of the back, as well as a modern reconstruction by Scott Hartman, 2011 (bottom)

The right shoulder blade of the specimen CM 11338 is inclined by approximately 45° with respect to the horizontal. Gilmore, in his 1925 monograph, argued that this specimen reflected the original orientation of the bone, and consequently, his skeletal reconstruction was slightly taller at the hips than at the shoulders. This finding contradicted the 1921 reconstruction of Osborn and Mook, which showed a much steeper shoulder blade, resulting in an animal that was taller at the shoulders than at the hips and with the base of the neck higher above the ground. Gilmore's interpretation of a low-angled shoulder blade subsequently became widely accepted for sauropods in general. In a 2007 study, Daniela Schwarz and colleagues compared the anatomy of the shoulder girdle with that of modern animals and concluded that Osborn and Mook's original interpretation of a steeply inclined (60–65°) shoulder blade and a consequently higher shoulder was correct. Ligaments would have run along the top of the neck, which would have been taut when the neck was sloping downwards or sidewards, helping to hold it. In a 2004 study, Takanobu Tsuihiji reconstructed the ligaments of Camarasaurus based on those of the Greater Rhea, in which the neural spines are similarly bifurcated. The nuchal ligament would have run along the top with branches connecting to either side of the bifurcated neural spines, while a second ligament, the Ligamentum elasticum interspinale, would have run in-between the two prongs of the bifurcated neural spines.

Historically, sauropods have been reconstructed with their tails dragged over the ground. In the 1921 Camarasaurus reconstruction of Osborn and Mook, the tail begins to slope downwards immediately behind the hips. While discussing his own Camarasaurus reconstruction in 1925, Gilmore argued that the first few tail vertebrae must have been horizontal, and that the tail sloped down only after this section. Sauropods are now thought to have had held their entire tails clear off the ground, as indicated by anatomy and trackway evidence.

=== Sexual dimorphism ===
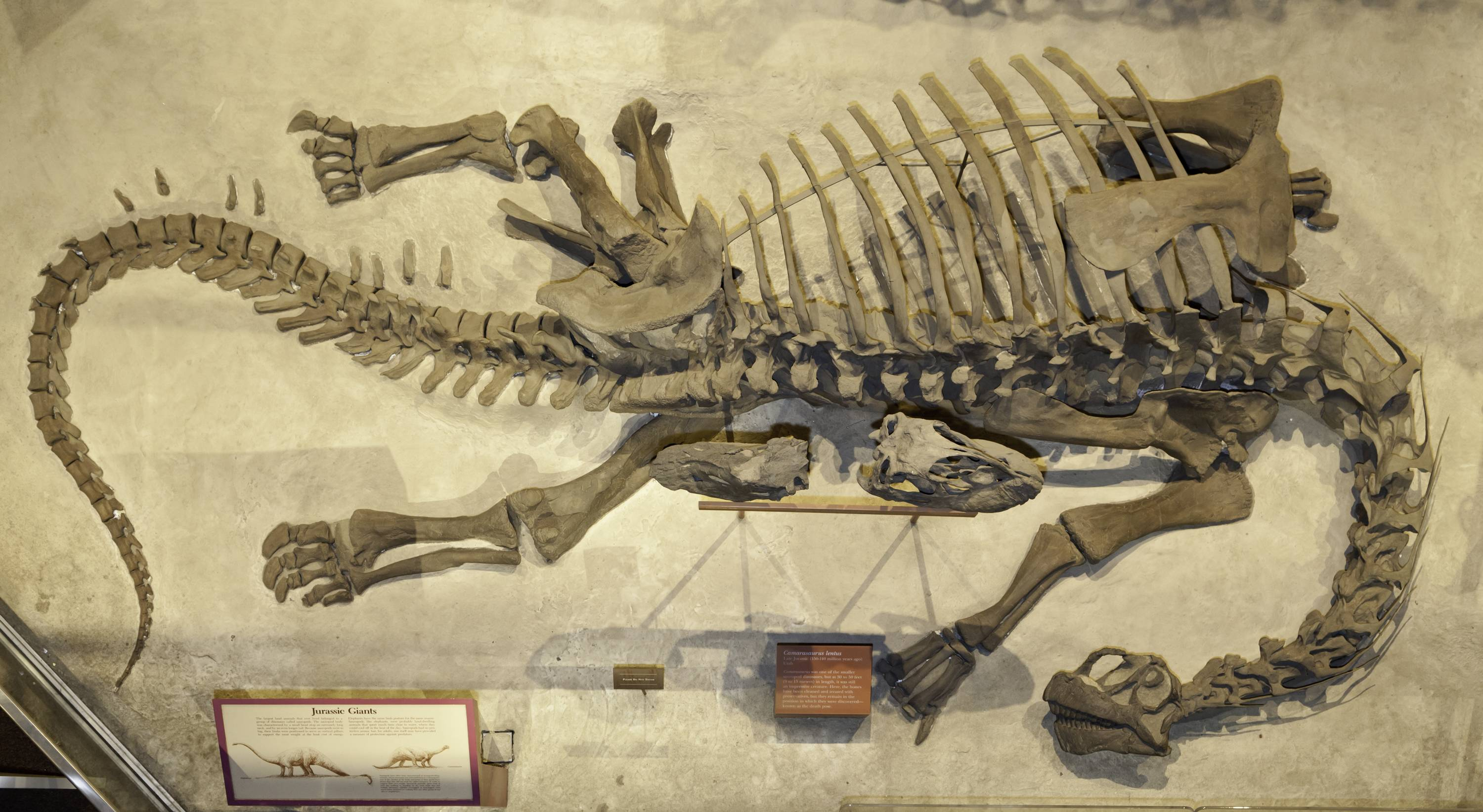
C. lentus specimen USNM 13786 as displayed in the National Museum of Natural History until 2019. This specimen was assigned to the "robust" morph by Takehito Ikejiri in 2008

In a 1991 study, Rothschild and Berman noted that in 25% of Camarasaurus specimens, some of the foremost tail vertebrae were fused together. In Apatosaurus and Diplodocus, such fusion even occurred in 50% of the individuals. The fusion is caused by ossified tendons rather than direct fusion of the vertebral bodies, and was identified as diffuse idiopathic skeletal hyperostosis (DISH). (Note: A 2012 review cautioned that DISH is not known from modern reptiles and birds, and that the medical definition of the condition requires the fusion of at least four continuous vertebrae, while the sauropod examples typically only involve two.) Therefore, this fusion was not pathological but might have been an adaptation for stiffening the tail. Rothschild and Berman suggested that the fusion was a sexually dimorphic feature that occurred only in the males or only in the females. In males, it could have supported whip-lash motions with the tip of the tail during fights with other males. In females, the stiffening could have helped with arching the tail to allow for copulation.

In a 2008 study, Ikejiri suggested that Camarasaurus specimens can be classified either as robust (strongly built) or as gracile (slender). These robust and gracile morphs also subtly differ in size and are apparent in the three most common species. Ikejiri argued that the two morphs reflect differences between the sexes, although it is unclear which morph represents male and which represents female individuals. In another 2008 study, Nicole Klein and Martin Sander found that individuals of similar age tend to fall into two size classes that might represent different species or sexual dimorphism.

=== Life history ===
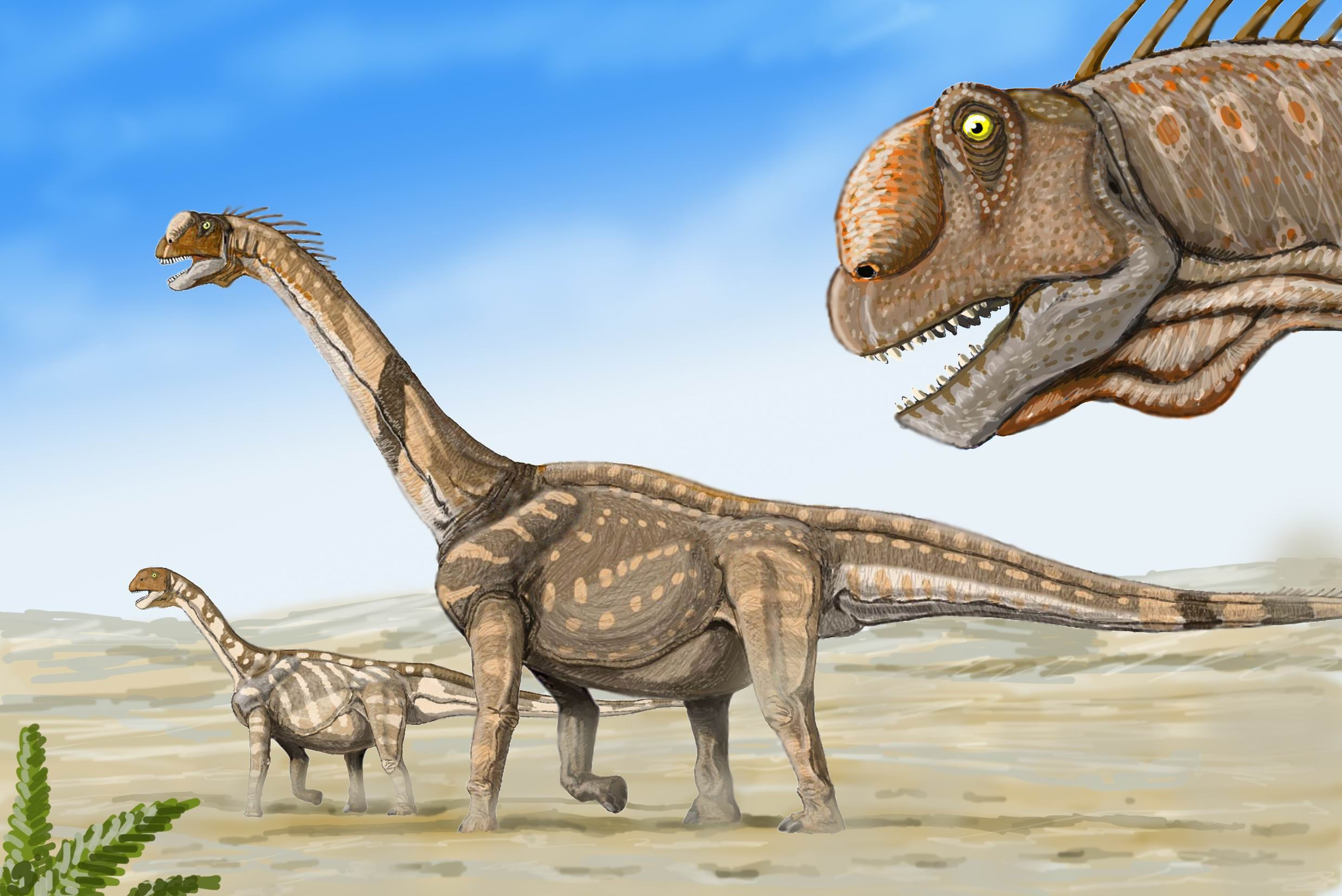
Hypothetical life restoration of a Camarasaurus group, including two adults and a juvenile

In 1883, Marsh reported the fragmentary skeleton of a very small sauropod discovered at Como Bluff, which he estimated at 2.1 m (7 ft) in body length. Based on the small size and the incomplete ossification (development of bone tissues) of the bones, Marsh argued that it must have belonged to an embryo. (Note: Marsh used the term foetus instead of embryo.) In 1896, Marsh assigned the specimen to a new species, Pleurocoelus montanus, without further comment, but probably because of the very large pleurocoels (excavations) in the vertebrae. In 1994, Kenneth Carpenter and McIntosh assigned this specimen to Camarasaurus grandis, and interpreted the large pleurocoels as a juvenile feature. Although a small juvenile, there is no evidence that this specimen is indeed an embryo as proposed by Marsh. In 1994, Brooks Britt and Bruce Naylor described a minute premaxilla of Camarasaurus discovered in Dry Mesa Quarry. The teeth of this bone have not yet erupted, suggesting that the individual did not yet hatch and was therefore an embryo. The bone is 37 mm (1.5 in) in length, suggesting a skull length of about 70 mm (2.8 in), a body length of just over 1 m (39 in), and a body weight of 7.5 kg (17 lb). Based on these estimates, the diameter of a hypothesized spherical egg would have been about 24 cm (9.4 in), smaller than the largest known bird eggs. The small size of the embryo provided evidence that sauropods were oviparous (egg-laying), casting doubt on a hypothesis proposed by Bakker in 1980 that sauropods were viviparous and gave birth to relatively large young. The first definitive sauropod embryos and eggs were described from the Argentinian locality Auca Mahuevo in 1998.

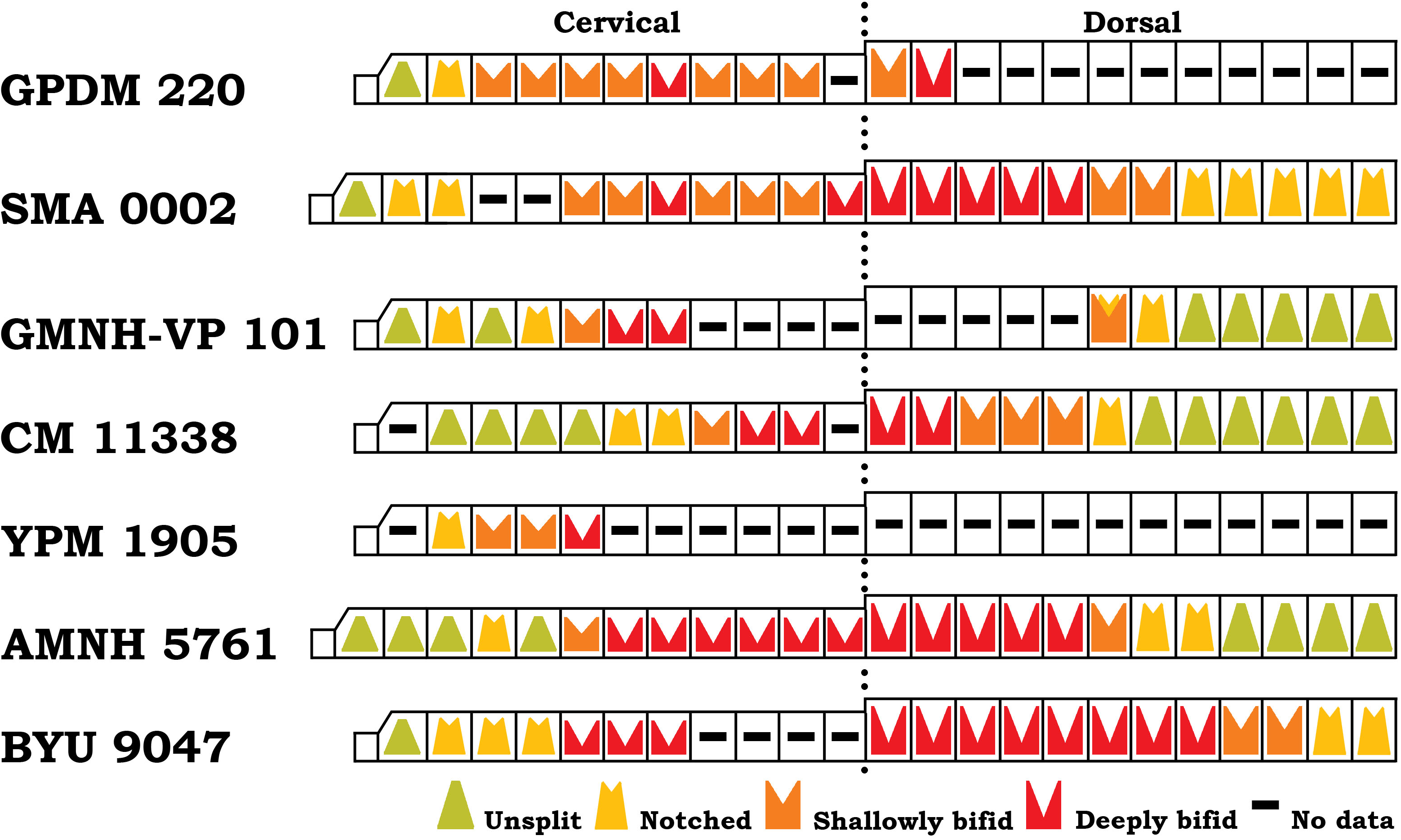
Diagram showing the degree of bifurcation (forking) of the neural spines in the neck and back vertebrae in various specimens

As in other dinosaurs, juveniles had proportionally larger heads, shorter necks and tails, and shorter limbs than adults. As the individual matured, the neural arches of the vertebrae fused with the vertebral bodies; in Camarasaurus, the vertebrae of the mid and rear portion of the tail fused before those of the sacrum. The bifurcation (forking) of the neural spines became more pronounced as the individuals aged. Other age-related changes found in adults include the rugose articular surfaces in the limbs, the closure of the coracoid foramen, the ossification of entheses of the vertebral column, and the fusion of the individual sacral vertebrae into a single structure. Changes during growth are particularly pronounced in the sternum, which is circular in the juvenile CM 11338 but grew long and narrow in adults. In contrast, the proportions of the limb bones did not change during growth, although the limbs were overall more robust in adults.

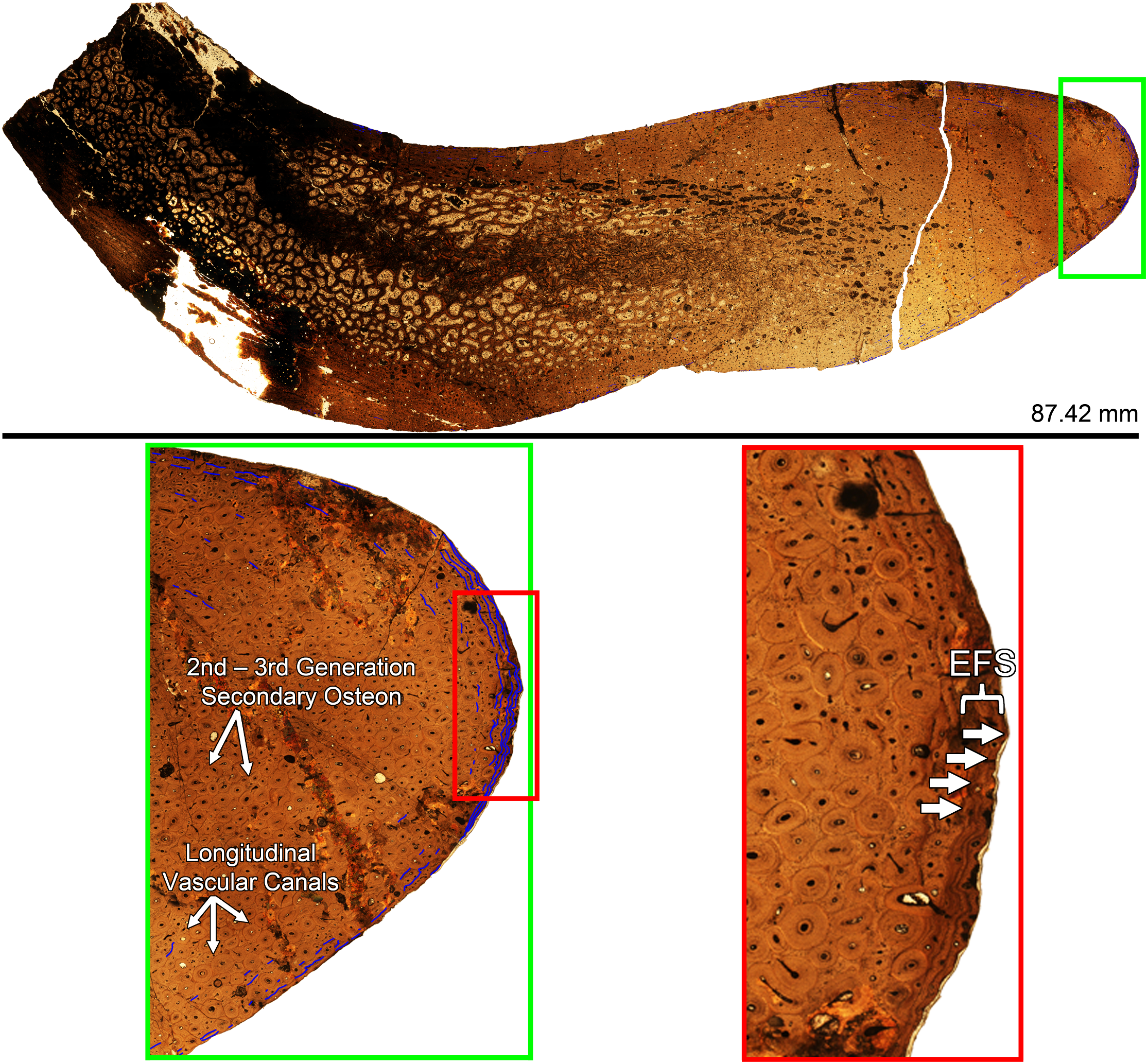
Histology of a dorsal rib of specimen GPDM 220

Growth rings and other features visible in thin sections of bones allow for reconstructing life history. As other sauropods, Camarasaurus grew as fast as modern birds and mammals, and reached sexual maturity well before reaching maximum body size. In 2013, Eva Maria Griebeler and colleagues examined thin sections of limb bones of a large Camarasaurus individual (CM 36664) with an estimated weight of 14.3 tonnes. This individual was estimated to have reached a maximum growth rate of 1.5 tonnes per year, sexual maturity at about 21 years, and death at around 26 years. A 2017 study by Woodruff and Foster estimated that the specimen GPDM 220 was probably about 30 years old, and maximally 35 years old, at the age of death. In 2014, Katja Waskow and Sander estimated that the specimen "E.T." reached sexual maturity at an age of 18 or 19 years and its full size at 40 years. As of 2024, GPDM 220 and "E.T." are amongst the oldest dinosaur individuals identified, even though representing relatively small individuals. According to Waskow and Sander, the small size of "E.T." suggests that it could have belonged to a new species that was particularly small. Dinosaurs might have grown throughout most of their lives. In 2021, Rothschild and Florian Witzmann determined that of 13 analyzed Camarasaurus specimens, 2 had probably reached full size, as indicated by the closure of vascular openings on the articular surfaces of long bones that provided nutrients for bone growth.

=== Metabolism ===
Dinosaurs were traditionally assumed to be ectothermic, relying largely on environmental temperatures to regulate their body temperature. Since the 1960s, however, evidence has suggested that dinosaurs were instead homoiothermic, capable of maintaining a relatively stable body temperature, or even endothermic, with elevated metabolic rates sufficient to sustain a high body temperature. Juvenile sauropods were probably endothermic, enabling their rapid growth. Fully grown individuals may have had lower metabolic rates, as their body temperature could have been maintained largely by their body mass. Body temperatures can be estimated from the isotope compositions of bones and teeth. In a 2002 study, William Showers and colleagues used oxygen isotope thermometry to analyze the bone apatite (the inorganic component of bone) of a Camarasaurus specimen. They found that temperature varied within the trunk but was lower in the legs and hips and higher in the neck and tail, compared to a specimen of the theropod Giganotosaurus. These differences between body parts may have resulted from countercurrent exchange of heat, in which excess heat was transferred from the trunk to peripheral regions, facilitating heat dissipation. In 2011, Robert Eagle and colleagues analyzed the tooth enamel of two sauropods, Camarasaurus and Giraffatitan, using clumped-isotope thermometry. They estimated body temperatures of 36–38 °C (97–100 °F), comparable to those of modern mammals.

=== Pathologies ===
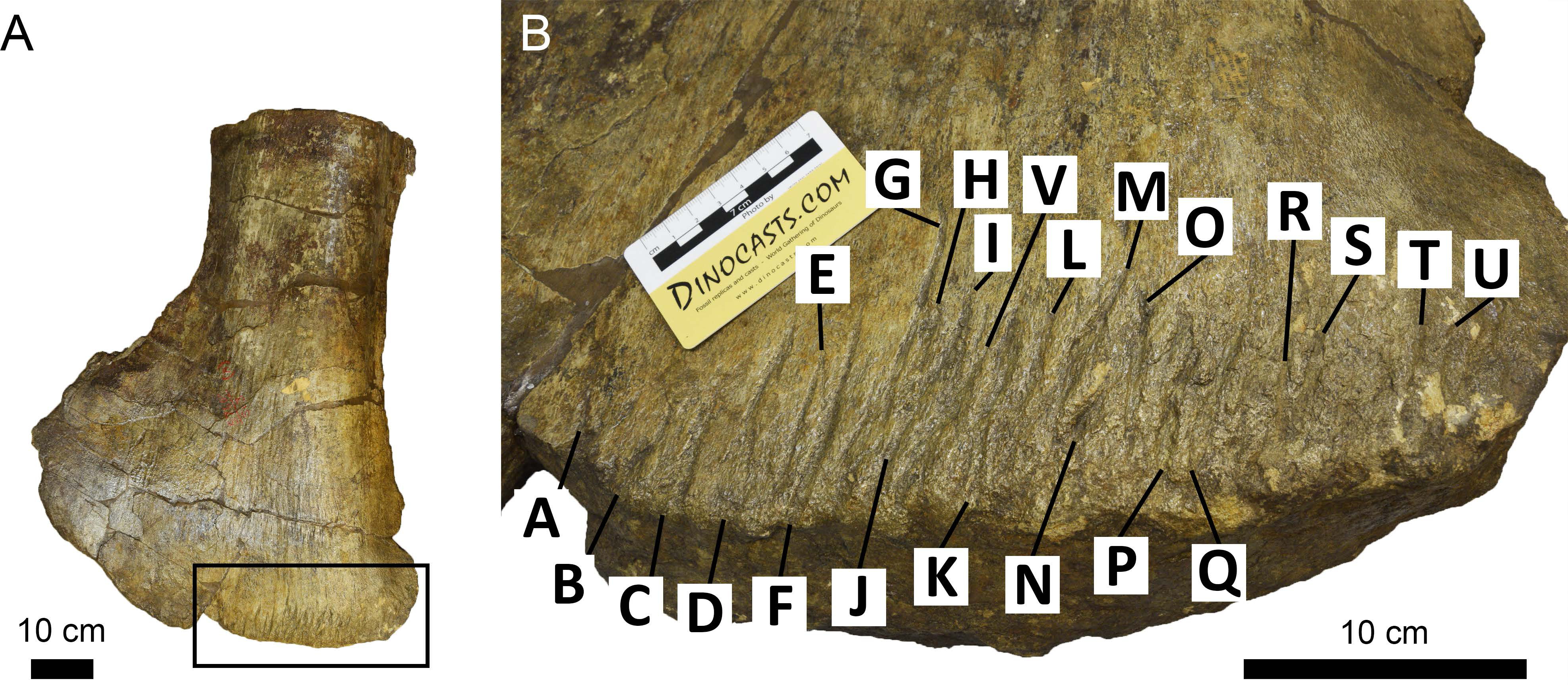
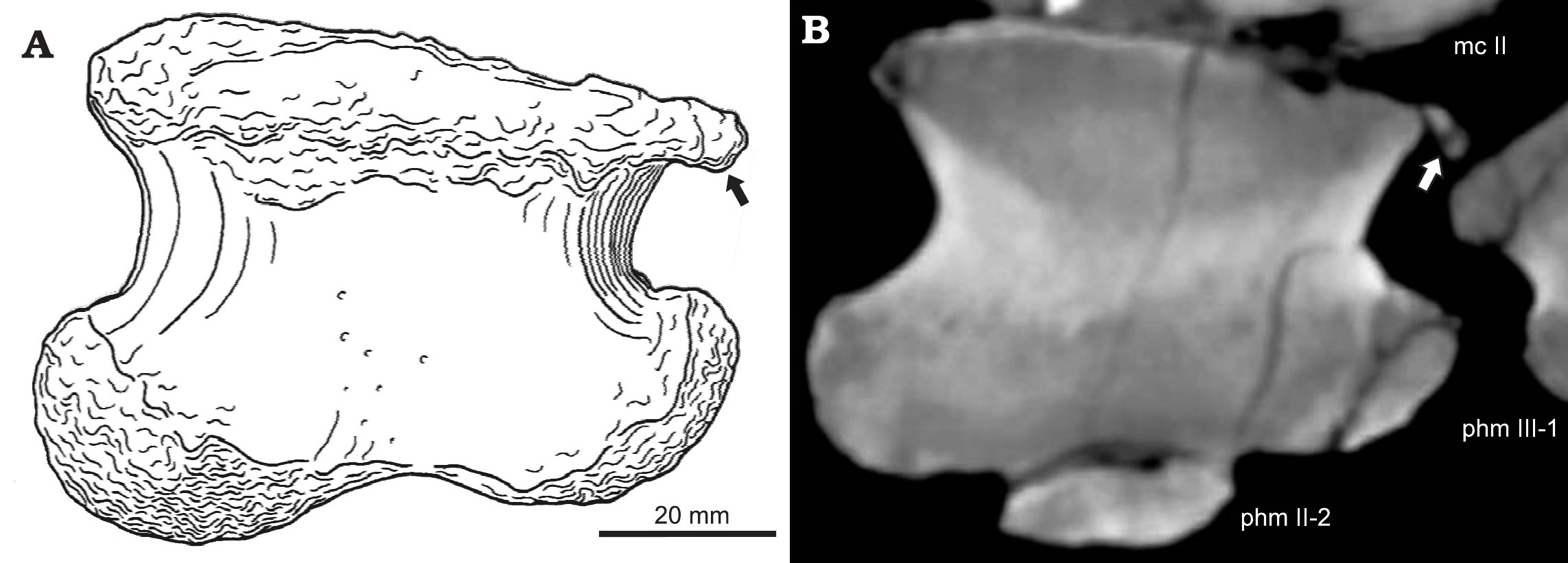
Bite marks in a C. supremus scapula (top), and pathological overgrowth in a phalanx of the specimen "E.T." (bottom)

Multiple instances of pathologies (injuries or diseases) have been recorded in Camarasaurus specimens. The bones of several specimens show bite marks; large examples in the type specimen of C. lewisi probably stem from Torvosaurus or Allosaurus. In 1996, McIntosh and colleagues described pathologies in thirteen vertebrae of the complete tail of the C. grandis specimen GMNH-PV 101. In two of these vertebrae, the neural arch failed to completely develop, a defect known as spina bifida – the first reported example of this condition in dinosaurs. In the 40th tail vertebra, only half of the neural arch had formed, leaving the spinal cord partly unprotected. At least five vertebrae show bone outgrowths around the joints of the vertebral bodies, indicating osteoarthritis (degenerative joint disease). Five consecutive tail vertebrae (49 through 53) are pathologically fused into a single structure.

A specimen from Bone Cabin Quarry showed erosions in the zygapophyses (joints between vertebrae) in four out of twenty tail vertebrae. In 2002, Rothschild and colleagues identified these as pathologies the oldest fossil evidence for inflammatory arthritis. (Note: An even older example of inflammatory arthritis has since been reported in an archosaur fossil from the Triassic.) In 2001, Lorrie McWhinney and colleagues described a periostitis, an injury of the periosteum (the outer layer of bones), in a humerus assigned to C. grandis. This injury involved parts of the bone to be fractured or being torn off, possibly due to stress or repeated excessive exertion of muscles. The subsequent healing process caused a tumor-like mass protruding from the bone surface. The injury would have been long-term and may have impaired the movement of the forelimb and caused a limp. In 2016, Emanuel Tschopp and colleagues described five different types of pathologies in the bones of the fore- and hind feet of "E. T.". Such co-occurrence of different pathologies in a single individual is rare and might be due to the advanced age of the individual. The pathologies include a deep pit interpreted as osteochondrosis as well as several types of bony overgrowths, one of which was interpreted as osteoarthritis. Bony shelves extending above the front articular surfaces of the phalanges of the hind feet were interpreted as enthesophytes caused by the insertion of tendons. These may have formed due to excessive use of the claws during life, possibly due to scratch-digging.

=== Hypothetical footprints ===
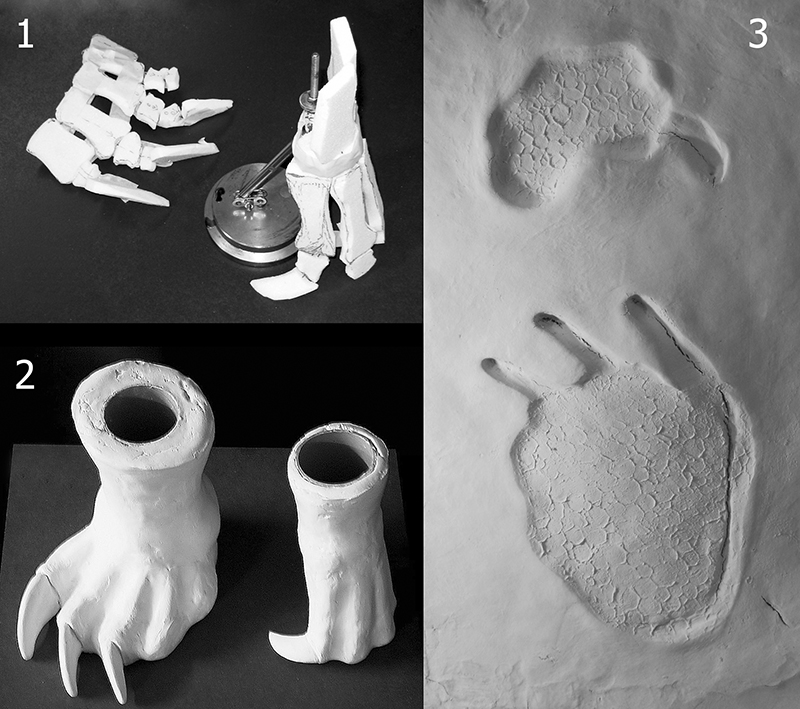
Model of fore- and hind feet (2) used to create hypothetical footprints (3) of Camarasaurus

In 2015, Tschopp and colleagues created models of the fore- and hind feet based on "E.T." to produce hypothetical footprints, showing that the prints of the hind feet were between three and four times larger than those of the forefeet. Their model also showed that the large thumb claw must have left an impression. Fossil trackways of sauropods often lack the thumb claw, leading some authors in the 1980s to suggest that the claw was carried above the ground, or that sauropods walked on their knuckles. In 2026, Philip Senter found that the fingers of Camarasaurus had a limited range of motion and that none of these proposed postures would have been possible. Fossil sauropod trackways may be categorized as "narrow-gauged" or "wide-gauged", depending on how close the tracks are to the trackway midline; Camarasaurus might have had an intermediate or wide gauge. So far, no fossil footprints have been confidently assigned to Camarasaurus.

== Paleoecology ==
=== Distribution and abundance ===
Camarasaurus is known from rocks of the Morrison Formation dating to the Kimmeridgian and Tithonian ages (155 to 143 million years ago). The Morrison Formation covers about 1.2 million km^{2} of western North America, and Camarasaurus is found across this range, from more than 100 localities as far north as Montana to as far south as New Mexico. According to Foster, the genus is found in Zones 2 to 6 of the formation, meaning that it is absent in the lowermost (oldest) portion. A single tail vertebra from the Summerville Formation of New Mexico has been assigned to the genus by Adrian Hunt and Spencer G. Lucas in 1993, but this occurrence was not recognized in a subsequent review. Remains from Zimbabwe and Germany have been assigned to Camarasaurus, which was questioned by subsequent studies.

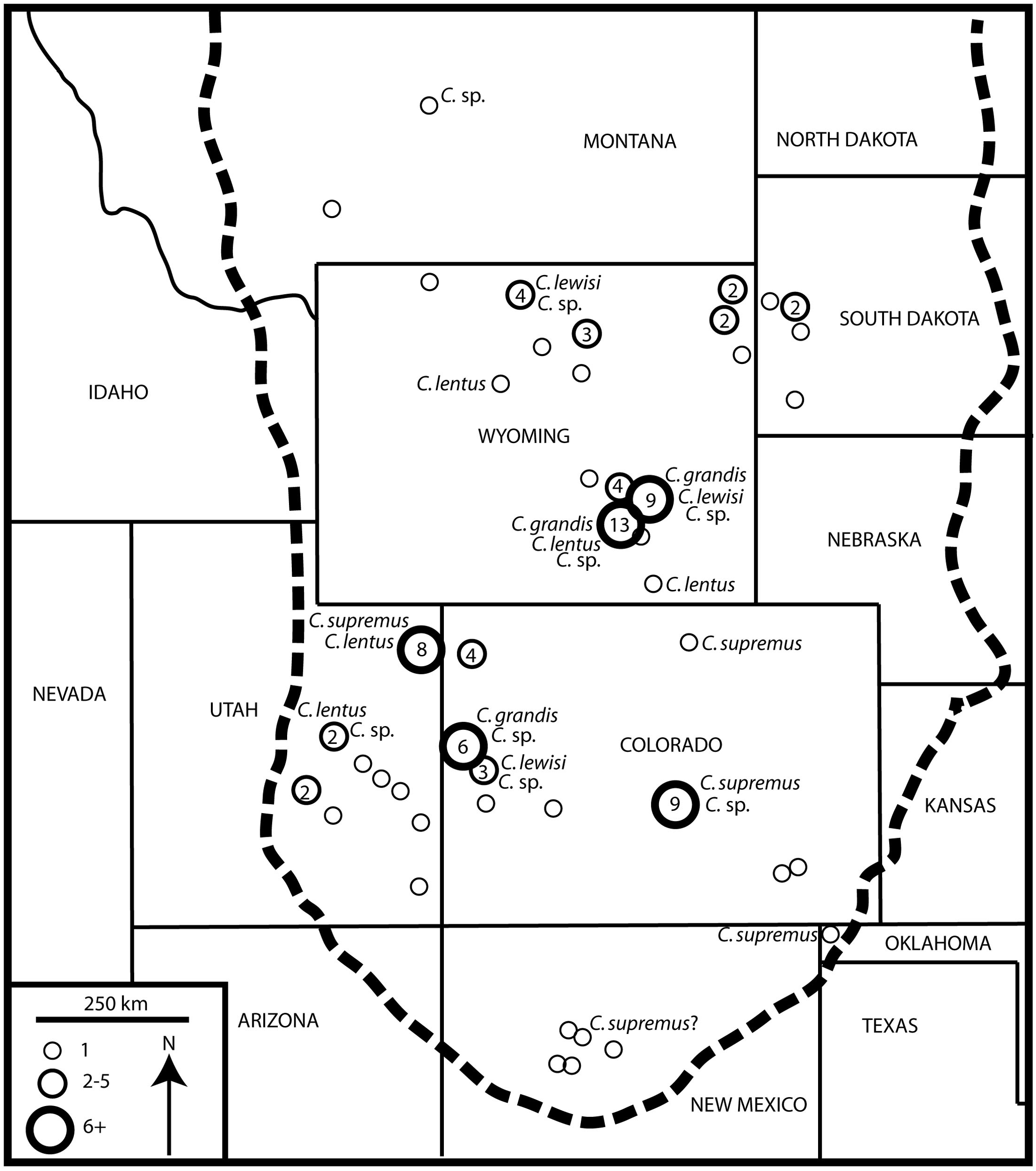
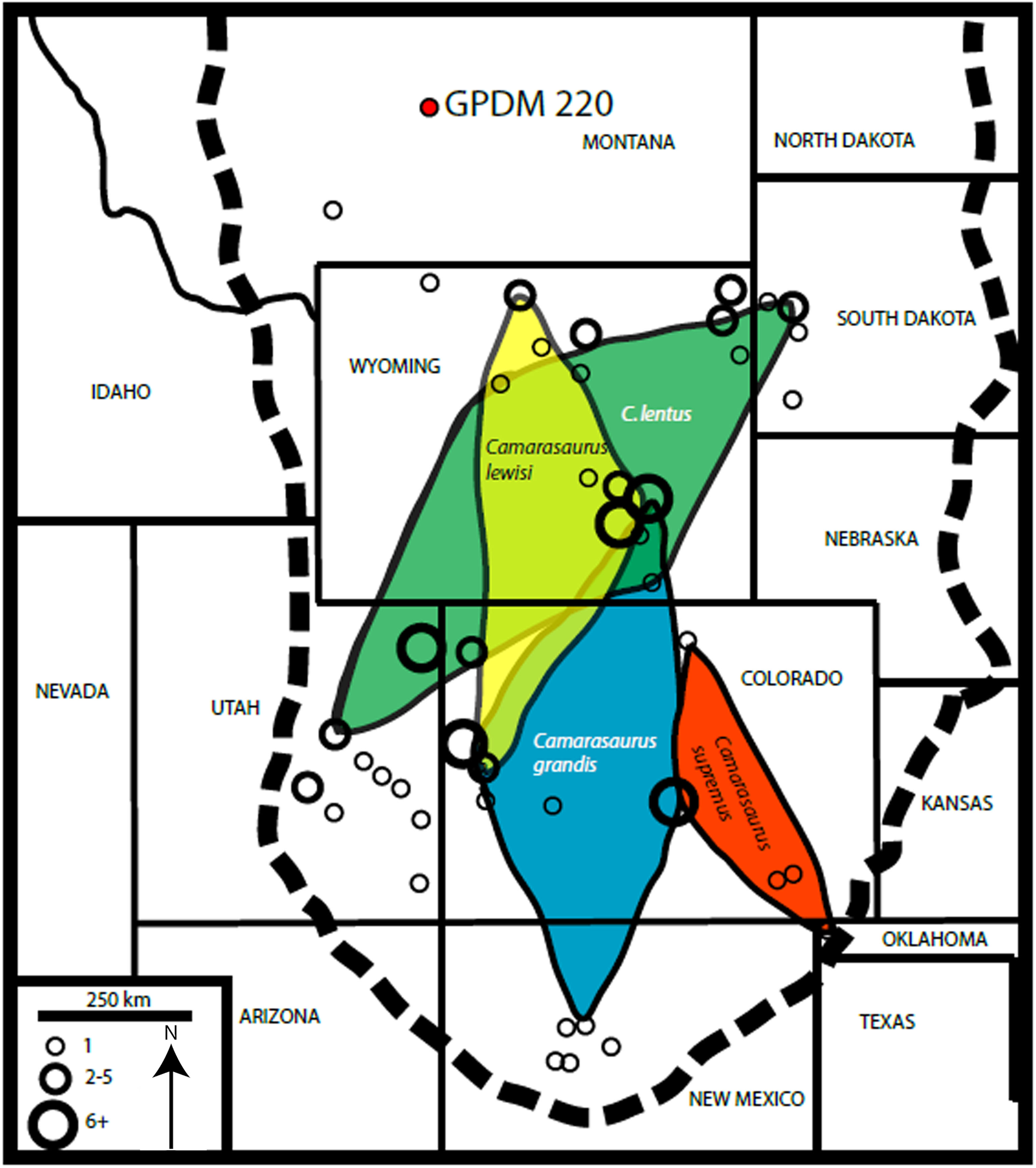
Camarasaurus localities within the Morrison Formation (dotted line), and the minimum distribution of species, according to Woodruff and Foster (2017)

Camarasaurus is known from over 530 specimens, including isolated bones and about 50 partial skeletons. It is the most common dinosaur of the Morrison Formation and, due to its abundance, one of the best-understood sauropods. In a 2003 survey of more than two hundred fossil localities, Foster reported 179 specimens of the genus, comparable to Apatosaurus (112) and Diplodocus (98), but far greater than Brachiosaurus (12), Haplocanthosaurus (12) and Barosaurus (13). As of 2022, 27% of sauropod specimens from the Morrison that could be assigned to a genus were Camarasaurus specimens. Most identifiable specimens of Camarasaurus belong to one of two species, C. grandis and C. lentus; C. supremus, and especially C. lewisi, are much rarer. Even though complete necks are rarely found in sauropods, five specimens of Camarasaurus preserve all or nearly all of the cervical vertebrae. Juvenile sauropod specimens are generally uncommon as their smaller size reduces their preservation potential. As of 2005, 44% of the sauropod specimens found in the Morrison Formation that are smaller than 50% of adult size are from Camarasaurus.

=== Paleoenvironment and migration ===
Paleoenvironmental reconstruction of the Morrison Formation, with Camarasaurus in the background on the left

The Morrison Formation is commonly interpreted as a semiarid environment with distinct wet and dry seasons. Large tree logs are common as well, indicating episodes with mesic (wetter) conditions. In 2011, Henry Fricke and colleagues analyzed the relative abundance of oxygen isotopes (δ^{18}O, or delta-O-18, values) in both Camarasaurus teeth and carbonate rocks across the Morrison basin. δ^{18}O values vary geographically, depending on factors such as aridity and altitude. Because the values obtained from the teeth differ from those obtained from the rocks they were found in, Fricke and colleagues concluded that Camarasaurus must have migrated between the Morrison basin and the high-altitude areas in the west to avoid the basin's dry season. This migration would probably have been seasonal and over a distance of 300 km (190 mi).

Sauropods might have been keystone species that shaped the Morrison ecosystem, similar to the role of modern elephants in Africa. As of 2024, a total of 25 sauropod species are recognized from the Morrison Formation. The most common genera are the diplodocids Apatosaurus, Diplodocus, Supersaurus, Barosaurus, Brontosaurus, and Galeamopus; the macronarian Brachiosaurus, and Haplocanthosaurus. Dicraeosaurids such as Smitanosaurus, Dyslocosaurus, and Suuwassea were rarer components of the fauna. Camarasaurus and other sauropods would have been preyed upon by large predatory theropods like Allosaurus and Torvosaurus; the former accounted for almost 75% of theropod specimens. In 2026, Cassius Morrison and colleagues stated that there is no conclusive evidence for pack hunting in large theropods, and estimated that a solitary Torvosaurus of ca. 2.5 t (5,500 lb) would rarely have preyed on sauropods more than twice its weight. Large individuals of Camarasaurus would therefore have been largely immune from predation.

Smaller theropods from the Morrison include Koparion, Stokesosaurus, Ornitholestes, and Ceratosaurus, and herbivorous ornithischians include Camptosaurus, Dryosaurus, Gargoyleosaurus and Stegosaurus. Other vertebrates that shared this paleoenvironment included ray-finned fish, frogs, salamanders, turtles like Dorsetochelys, sphenodonts, lizards, terrestrial and aquatic crocodylomorphs such as Hoplosuchus, and several species of pterosaur like Harpactognathus and Mesadactylus. The flora included horsetails, cycads, ginkgoes, ferns, Bennettitales, seed ferns, and several families of conifers.
