= List of dinosaurs of the Morrison Formation =

Mural at the Dinosaur National Monument

The Morrison Formation is a distinctive sequence of Upper Jurassic sedimentary rocks that is found in the western United States, which has been the most fertile source of dinosaur fossils in North America. It is composed of mudstone, sandstone, siltstone, and limestone, and is light gray, greenish gray, or red. Most of the fossils occur in the green siltstone beds and lower sandstones, relics of the rivers and floodplains of the Jurassic period.

== Fauna comparisons ==
The fauna of the Morrison Formation is similar to the ones found in the coeval rocks of the Tendaguru Formation from Tanzania and Lourinhã and Alcobaça Formation from Portugal respectively. Some genera are shared between the Morrison and the Portuguese formations (Lourinhã and Alcobaça Formation), such as Torvosaurus, Ceratosaurus, Stegosaurus, and Allosaurus.

== Ornithischians ==
The herbivorous ornithischian dinosaurs were diverse but not as common as sauropods in the Morrison. Fruitadens, previously known as the "Fruita Echinodon", was a heterodontosaurid. Stegosaurs included Hesperosaurus mjosi, Stegosaurus (S. ungulatus and S. stenops), Alcovasaurus longispinus and possibly Miragaia longicollum. Ankylosaurs were unknown in the formation until the 1990s. Two have been named: Gargoyleosaurus parkpinorum and Mymoorapelta maysi. Small neornithischians included Nanosaurus agilis, Enigmacursor mollyborthwickae, Laosaurus (L. celer and L. gracilis), Drinker nisti, Othnielia rex, and Othnielosaurus consors (the last three of which are now considered synonymous with Nanosaurus). Ornithopods were represented by Dryosaurus (D. altus and D. elderae), Uteodon aphanoecetes, which is currently known only from Dinosaur National Monument, and the larger, more common Camptosaurus dispar. All of the aforementioned ornithopod genera were early iguanodonts, the group that gave rise to the duck-billed dinosaurs.

=== Neornithischians ===
Color key: Taxon / Reclassified taxon / Taxon falsely reported as present / Dubious taxon or junior synonym / Ichnotaxon / Ootaxon / Morphotaxon

Notes
Uncertain or tentative taxa are in small text
~~crossed out~~ taxa are discredited.

Genus	Species	Locality	Material	Notes	Images
Anomoepus	A. isp.	Colorado		Anomoepus from the Morrison lack the handprint impressions found associated with earlier instances of the ichnogenus in New England	
Camptosaurus	C. amplus	Wyoming		Now known to be based on a theropod foot	Camptosaurus dispar
Camptosaurus	C. aphanoecetes	Utah, Brushy Basin member		Reclassified as Uteodon	Camptosaurus dispar
Camptosaurus	C. browni			Junior synonym of C. dispar	Camptosaurus dispar
Camptosaurus	C. dispar	Colorado, Oklahoma, Utah and Wyoming	Twenty-five to thirty disarticulated skull elements, some with associated postcrania, and approximately ten partial, articulated skeletons, all from juveniles and adults	A member of Ankylopollexia. Junior synonyms include Camptosaurus browni, C. medius, and C. nanus	Camptosaurus dispar
Camptosaurus	C. medius			Junior synonym of C. dispar	Camptosaurus dispar
Camptosaurus	C. nanus			Junior synonym of C. dispar	Camptosaurus dispar
Dinehichnus	D. socialis	Utah, Saltwash member	Multiple trackways have been discovered. The tracks run parallel to one another, indicating that the trackmaker was at least a somewhat social animal	Dinehichnus are attributed to dryosaurids. The tracks preserve feet characterized by widely splayed toes that are rotated somewhat towards the midline of the trackmaker's body. Each track is accompanied by "distinct heel impressions"	
Drinker	D. nisti	Wyoming	"Partial skull and postcranial skeleton."	Junior synonym of Nanosaurus	
Dryosaurus	D. altus	Colorado and Wyoming, Brushy Basin member	The remains of many individuals have been uncovered, with some sites containing hundreds of bones from Dryosaurus of multiple age groups	A dryosaurid iguanodont. It was physically similar to Nanosaurus, although larger and with more derived teeth	Dryosaurus altus
Dryosaurus	D. elderae	Utah, Brushy Basin member	Two partial skeletons, one from a juvenile, and two additional fragmentary specimens	The second described species of Dryosaurus	
Enigmacursor	E. mollyborthwickae	Colorado	A partial but three-dimensionally preserved skeleton	A small neornithischian	Enigmacursor mollyborthwickae
Laosaurus	L. altus			Now known as Dryosaurus altus	
Laosaurus	L. celer	Wyoming		Considered dubious due to fragmentary remains	
Laosaurus	L. consors			Now known as Othnielosaurus consors	
Laosaurus	L. gracilis			Considered dubious due to fragmentary remains	
Nanosaurus	N. agilis	Colorado, Brushy Basin member		A small basal neornithischian known from dozens of individuals. The holotype, YPM VP 1913, is a fragmentary skeleton from a juvenile	Nanosaurus agilis
Othnielia	O. rex	Colorado, Brushy Basin member	An isolated femur	Considered dubious and many remains historically assigned to this taxon are now placed within Nanosaurus	
Othnielosaurus	O. consors	Utah and Wyoming		Junior synonym of Nanosaurus	
Preprismatoolithus	P. coloradensis	Colorado, Salt Wash member	Eggshells are present in great abundance at the so-called "Young Egg Locality" which seems to have been a dinosaur nesting ground. Congeneric eggshell fossils are found at additional Colorado sites including the Fruita Paleontological Area, the Uravan Locality, and Garden Park.	P. coloradensis is described by John Foster as being "of the prismatic basic type", with subspherical eggs about 10 cm (3.9 in) in diameter. This oospecies has been attributed to "hypsilophodontid" dinosaurs, although a lack of associated embryo material currently makes confirming the layer's identity impossible	
Tichosteus	T. aequifacies	Colorado	Two partial dorsal centra of a juvenile		
Tichosteus	T. lucasanus	Colorado	Two partial dorsal centra		
Uteodon	U. aphanoecetes	Utah, Brushy Basin member	An articulated postcranial skeleton	Sometimes synonymized with Camptosaurus	Uteodon aphanoecetes

=== Thyreophorans ===
==== Ankylosaurs ====
Color key: Taxon / Reclassified taxon / Taxon falsely reported as present / Dubious taxon or junior synonym / Ichnotaxon / Ootaxon / Morphotaxon

Notes
Uncertain or tentative taxa are in small text
~~crossed out~~ taxa are discredited.

Genus	Species	Locality	Material	Notes	Images
Gargoyleosaurus	G. parkpinorum	Wyoming	Skull and partial postcranium	A nodosaurid ankylosaur known from reasonably complete fossil remains. Its skull measures 29 cm (11 in) in length, and its total body length is an estimated 3 to 4 m (9.8 to 13.1 ft). It may have weighed as much as 1 t (2,200 lb)	Gargoyleosaurus parkpinorum
Mymoorapelta	M. maysi	Colorado and Utah, Brushy Basin member	Skull fragments, portions of three skeletons, and other postcrania	Both the first ankylosaur discovered in the formation and the first known North American Jurassic ankylosaur. It probably weighed 500 kg (1,100 lb) in life	Mymoorapelta maysi

==== Stegosaurs ====
Color key: Taxon / Reclassified taxon / Taxon falsely reported as present / Dubious taxon or junior synonym / Ichnotaxon / Ootaxon / Morphotaxon

Notes
Uncertain or tentative taxa are in small text
~~crossed out~~ taxa are discredited.

Genus	Species	Locality	Material	Notes	Images
Alcovasaurus	A. longispinus	Wyoming, Brushy Basin member	A fragmentary postcranial skeleton from an adult	A dacentrurine stegosaurid physically similar to Stegosaurus stenops but with much larger tail spines. It is also similar to Kentrosaurus in having long dermal spikes on the caudal region. Possibly a species of the genus Miragaia.	Alcovasaurus longispinus
Deltapodus	D. brodricki			Stegosaur track	
Hesperosaurus	H. mjosi	Wyoming and Montana	Multiple partial skeletons and skulls	A stegosaurine stegosaurid that was slightly smaller than Stegosaurus itself. Hesperosaurus has a broader skull and longer, lower plates. Considered by some researchers to be a species of Stegosaurus.	Hesperosaurus mjosi
Hypsirhophus	H. discurus	Colorado, Brushy Basin member		A stegosaurine stegosaurid	Hypsirhophus discurus
Miragaia	cf. M. longicollum	Utah, Brushy Basin Member	An isolated cervical plate	A dacentrurine stegosaurid	Miragaia longicollum
Miragaia	M. sp.	Wyoming and Utah, Brushy Basin Member	Multiple caudal spines, a dorsal rib and two chevrons	A dacentrurine stegosaurid	
Stegopodus		Utah	Stegopodus represent only a portion of the Morrison's stegosaur tracks, which are already rare and generally only preserve the animal's hind feet	Stegosaur tracks which record front feet with five digits and hind feet with three weight-bearing digits. The general morphology of the tracks fit scientific predictions made eight years in advance of the erection of Stegopodus	
Stegosaurus	S. armatus	Colorado, Brushy Basin	Several caudal vertebrae and assorted fragmentary postcranial elements.	S. armatus is both the first Stegosaurus species to be discovered and the original type species. Its type specimen is poorly preserved, incomplete, and lacks diagnostic features. It has been considered dubious, with S. stenops as the neotype species for the genus	
Stegosaurus	S. stenops	Colorado, Utah and Wyoming, Brushy Basin member	Two complete skeletons with skulls, four braincases, and at least fifty partial postcrania, all from juveniles and adults	The best known Stegosaurus species. It has shorter limbs and larger plates than S. ungulatus	Stegosaurus stenops
Stegosaurus	S. sulcatus	Wyoming	Several postcranial elements, including a possible shoulder spike.	Often considered synonymous with S. stenops, but it may be distinct. Potentially had a shoulder spike, otherwise unknown in Stegosaurus, despite being present in most relatives	
Stegosaurus	S. ungulatus	Wyoming and Utah	Several partial skeletons, including a partial braincase	S. ungulatus had longer limbs and comparatively smaller plates than the better known S. stenops. Although formerly portrayed with eight tail spikes, it is now known to have had the typical four. Possibly synonymous with S. stenops	Stegosaurus ungulatus
Stegosaurus	Indeterminate	New Mexico & Oklahoma			

=== Other ornithischians ===
Color key: Taxon / Reclassified taxon / Taxon falsely reported as present / Dubious taxon or junior synonym / Ichnotaxon / Ootaxon / Morphotaxon

Notes
Uncertain or tentative taxa are in small text
~~crossed out~~ taxa are discredited.

Genus	Species	Locality	Material	Notes	Images
Anomoepus	A. isp				
Fruitadens	F. haagarorum	Colorado, Brushy Basin member	A partial skull and mandible with several postcranial elements	A heterodontosaurid	Fruitadens haagarorum

== Sauropods ==
Sauropods, the giant long-necked long-tailed four-legged herbivorous dinosaurs, are among the most common and famous Morrison fossils. A few have uncertain relationships, like "Apatosaurus" minimus (possibly a basal titanosauriform) and Haplocanthosaurus. Sauropods including Haplocanthosaurus priscus, H. delfsi, and the diplodocid Brontosaurus yahnahpin appeared in the early stages of the Morrison. The middle stages were dominated by familiar forms such as the giraffe-like Brachiosaurus altithorax, which were uncommon, but related camarasaurids, like Camarasaurus supremus, C. grandis, C. lentus, and Cathetosaurus/Camarasaurus lewisi, were very common. Also common were long, low diplodocids, like Apatosaurus ajax, A. louisae, Brontosaurus excelsus, B. parvus, Barosaurus lentus, Diplodocus longus, D. carnegii, Galeamopus and Dyslocosaurus polyonychius.

By the late Morrison, gigantic diplodocids (or similar species) had appeared, including Diplodocus hallorum (formerly Seismosaurus), Supersaurus vivianae, Amphicoelias altus, and Maraapunisaurus fragilimus. Smaller sauropods, such as Suuwassea emiliae from Montana, tend to be found in the northern reaches of the Morrison, near the shores of the ancient Sundance Sea, suggesting ecological niches favoring smaller body size there compared with the giants found further south.

=== Turiasaurs ===
Color key: Taxon / Reclassified taxon / Taxon falsely reported as present / Dubious taxon or junior synonym / Ichnotaxon / Ootaxon / Morphotaxon

Notes
Uncertain or tentative taxa are in small text
~~crossed out~~ taxa are discredited.

Genus	Species	Locality	Material	Notes	Images
Turiasauria indet.		Colorado, Brushy Basin member	FHPR 18687, mold and casts of 8 teeth.	Hypothesized to belong to a single individual, based on original teeth found associated and in a small area of a single quarry. Phylogenetic analysis suggests that FHPR 18687 teeth are the sister taxon of Losillasaurus.	

=== Haplocanthosaurids ===
Color key: Taxon / Reclassified taxon / Taxon falsely reported as present / Dubious taxon or junior synonym / Ichnotaxon / Ootaxon / Morphotaxon

Notes
Uncertain or tentative taxa are in small text
~~crossed out~~ taxa are discredited.

Genus	Species	Locality	Material	Notes	Images
Haplocanthosaurus	H. delfsi	Colorado, Brushy Basin member	Partial skeleton lacking a skull.	Small haplocanthosaurs of indeterminate classification, ranging about 14 metres (46 feet) long.	Haplocanthosaurus delfsi
Haplocanthosaurus	H. priscus	Colorado and Wyoming, Brushy Basin member	Two skulless partial skeletons.	Small haplocanthosaurs of indeterminate classification, ranging about 14 metres (46 feet) long.	Haplocanthosaurus delfsi

=== Rebbachisaurids ===
Color key: Taxon / Reclassified taxon / Taxon falsely reported as present / Dubious taxon or junior synonym / Ichnotaxon / Ootaxon / Morphotaxon

Notes
Uncertain or tentative taxa are in small text
~~crossed out~~ taxa are discredited.

Genus	Species	Locality	Material	Notes	Images
Maraapunisaurus	M. fragillimus	Colorado, Brushy Basin member	A single, now lost, dorsal neural arch.	Large rebbachisaurid. Based on a single lost neural arch 1.5 metres (4.9 feet) tall.	Lost type vertebra of Maraapunisaurus fragillimus next to Edward D. Cope.

=== Dicraeosaurids ===
Color key: Taxon / Reclassified taxon / Taxon falsely reported as present / Dubious taxon or junior synonym / Ichnotaxon / Ootaxon / Morphotaxon

Notes
Uncertain or tentative taxa are in small text
~~crossed out~~ taxa are discredited.

Genus	Species	Locality	Material	Notes	Images
Athenar	A. bermani	Utah	A braincase and partial skull roof	A dicraeosaurid sauropod. The material was originally assigned to Diplodocus, but redescribed as a novel genus of dicraeosaur in 2025.	Athenar
Dyslocosaurus	D. polyonychius	Wyoming	A fragmentary forelimb and partial hindlimbs.	Phylogenetic placement is uncertain.	
Smitanosaurus	S. agilis	Colorado, Brushy Basin member	"Partial skull and cervicals."	A dicraeosaurid sauropod. Originally described as "Morosaurus" agilis.	
Suuwassea	S. emilieae	Montana, Brushy Basin member	A partial skull and some postcrania.	A dicraeosaurid about 15m in length.	

=== Diplodocids ===
Color key: Taxon / Reclassified taxon / Taxon falsely reported as present / Dubious taxon or junior synonym / Ichnotaxon / Ootaxon / Morphotaxon

Notes
Uncertain or tentative taxa are in small text
~~crossed out~~ taxa are discredited.

Genus	Species	Locality	Material	Notes	Images
Amphicoelias	A. altus	Colorado, Brushy Basin member	2 dorsal vertebrae, femur, and a pubis.	A large diplodocoid.	Amphicoelias altus
Apatosaurus	A. ajax	— Colorado, Brushy Basin member	A partial postcranial skeleton and posterior skull.	A robust and abundantly widespread apatosaurine diplodocid reaching lengths of up to 25 metres (82 feet). "A." minimus likely belongs to a separate genus.	Apatosaurus louisae
Apatosaurus	A. louisae	Colorado and Utah, Brushy Basin member	Four partial specimens, one of them including a skull. Three of the specimens are from DNM, one is a mid cervical from Como Bluff.	A robust and abundantly widespread apatosaurine diplodocid reaching lengths of up to 25 metres (82 feet). "A." minimus likely belongs to a separate genus.	Apatosaurus louisae
Apatosaurus	"A." minimus	Wyoming	"Sacrum and pelvis."	A robust and abundantly widespread apatosaurine diplodocid reaching lengths of up to 25 metres (82 feet). "A." minimus likely belongs to a separate genus.	Apatosaurus louisae
Ardetosaurus	A. viator	Howe-Stephens Quarry, Wyoming.	Holotype specimen MAB011899, a partial skeleton containing the sacrum, ribs, a coracoid and parts of the vertebral column and hindlegs.	A diplodocine sauropod from the younger layers of the Morrison Formation, originally considered a specimen of Diplodocus.	Ardetosaurus viator
Atlantosaurus	A. montanus	Colorado, Brushy Basin member	A partial sacrum that cannot be distinguished from Camarasaurus or Apatosaurus.	A dubious neosauropod.	
Barosaurus	B. lentus	South Dakota, Utah and Montana	2 partial postcranial skeletons, with possibly more specimens assignable.	A diplodocid about 24 metres (79 feet) in length, similar in appearance to Diplodocus. It was the rarest sauropod in the Morrison Formation.	Barosaurus lentus
Barosaurus	B. sp.	Colorado, Wyoming, Utah and Oklahoma			Barosaurus lentus
Brontosaurus	B. excelsus	Wyoming, Brushy Basin member	Two postcranial skeletons.	Previously considered a species of Apatosaurus as per Riggs (1903).	Brontosaurus excelsus
Brontosaurus	B. parvus	Utah and Wyoming, Salt Wash and Brushy Basin members	Three headless skeletons.	Originally called Elosaurus.	
Brontosaurus	B. yahnahpin	Wyoming, Brushy Basin member	A partial postcranial skeleton.	An apatosaurine diplodocid slightly more primitive than Apatosaurus. Formerly placed in separate genus Eobrontosaurus.	
Diplodocus	D. carnegii	Wyoming, Brushy Basin Member	Known from two skulls, five partial skeletons that lack skulls and manus, and hundreds of isolated postcranial remains.	A large diplodocid reaching lengths of up to 28 metres (92 feet). It was one of the most abundant sauropods in the area.	Diplodocus carnegii
Diplodocus	D. hallorum	New Mexico, Wyoming and Utah, Brushy Basin and Salt Wash members	At least 4 partial postcranial skeletons	Once classified as Seismosaurus.	Diplodocus hallorum
Diplodocus	D. lacustris	Colorado, Brushy Basin member	Known from teeth and skull remains, the latter now referred to Camarasaurus. Teeth cannot be referred beyond Flagellicaudata.		
Diplodocus	D. longus	Colorado, Brushy Basin member	Several caudal vertebrae.		
Galeamopus	G. hayi	Wyoming, Brushy Basin member	Known from a partial skeleton and braincase.		Galeamopus hayi
Galeamopus	G. pabsti	Colorado and Wyoming, Brushy Basin member	A skull and partial postcranial skeleton, another individual known from partial skull.		
Kaatedocus	K. siberi	Wyoming, Salt Wash member	Skull and cervical vertebrae.		Kaatedocus siberi
Parabrontopodus	P. mcintoshi				
Saurophaganax	S. maximus	Oklahoma, Brushy Basin member	Several partial postcranial skeletons.	Historically considered to be an allosaurid close to or a species of Allosaurus, but re-evaluated as a dubious, chimeric genus of saurischian, likely a diplodocid sauropod.	
Supersaurus	S. vivianae	Colorado and Wyoming, Brushy Basin member	Known from several partial postcranial skeletons.	A large diplodocid about 33–34 m (108–112 ft) in length	Supersaurus vivianae

=== Macronarians ===
Color key: Taxon / Reclassified taxon / Taxon falsely reported as present / Dubious taxon or junior synonym / Ichnotaxon / Ootaxon / Morphotaxon

Notes
Uncertain or tentative taxa are in small text
~~crossed out~~ taxa are discredited.

Genus	Species	Locality	Material	Notes	Images
Brachiosaurus	B. altithorax	Colorado, Brushy Basin and Salt Wash members	Several partial skeletons and a partial skull.	A large brachiosaurid about 18–22 m (59–72 ft) long.	Brachiosaurus altithorax
Brontopodus	B. isp.				
Camarasaurus	C. annae	Utah, Brushy Basin member	A dorsal vertebra.	Camarasaurs reached an adult size of about 18 metres (59 feet) in length. C. annae junior synonym of C. lentus. C. lewisi was originally described as Cathetosarus lewisi and was later sunk into Camarasaurus, until being considered valid once again in 2013.	Camarasaurus supremus
Camarasaurus	C. grandis	Colorado, Montana and Wyoming	"At least 6 partial skeletons including 2 skulls, hundreds of postcranial elements."	Camarasaurs reached an adult size of about 18 metres (59 feet) in length. C. annae junior synonym of C. lentus. C. lewisi was originally described as Cathetosarus lewisi and was later sunk into Camarasaurus, until being considered valid once again in 2013.	Camarasaurus supremus
Camarasaurus	C. lentus	Utah and Wyoming	"5 skeletons with skulls, hundreds of postcranial elements"	Camarasaurs reached an adult size of about 18 metres (59 feet) in length. C. annae junior synonym of C. lentus. C. lewisi was originally described as Cathetosarus lewisi and was later sunk into Camarasaurus, until being considered valid once again in 2013.	Camarasaurus supremus
Camarasaurus	C. lewisi	Colorado, Brushy Basin member	A nearly complete postcranial skeleton.	Camarasaurs reached an adult size of about 18 metres (59 feet) in length. C. annae junior synonym of C. lentus. C. lewisi was originally described as Cathetosarus lewisi and was later sunk into Camarasaurus, until being considered valid once again in 2013.	Camarasaurus supremus
Camarasaurus	C. supremus	Colorado and Oklahoma(?), Brushy Basin member	At least 4 partial skeletons including partial skulls. Many possible postcranial remains from Oklahoma.	Camarasaurs reached an adult size of about 18 metres (59 feet) in length. C. annae junior synonym of C. lentus. C. lewisi was originally described as Cathetosarus lewisi and was later sunk into Camarasaurus, until being considered valid once again in 2013.	Camarasaurus supremus
Camarasaurus	Indeterminate.	Oklahoma, South Dakota and Texas		Camarasaurs reached an adult size of about 18 metres (59 feet) in length. C. annae junior synonym of C. lentus. C. lewisi was originally described as Cathetosarus lewisi and was later sunk into Camarasaurus, until being considered valid once again in 2013.	Camarasaurus supremus
Dystrophaeus	D. viaemalae	Utah, Tidwell member	Multiple vertebrae, teeth and incomplete forelimb material.	Previously recovered as a diplodocid, now recovered as a macronarian Type material fragmentary, but recent rediscovery of type locality has discovered more material.	

== Theropods ==
Theropod dinosaurs, the carnivorous dinosaurs, came in several different types. The less derived types, the ceratosaurs and megalosaurids, included Ceratosaurus nasicornis, C. dentisulcatus, C. magnicornis, and the megalosaur Torvosaurus tanneri (including Edmarka rex). Allosaurids included the common Allosaurus fragilis (including Epanterias amplexus), A. jimmadseni and A. anax (previously referred to Saurophaganax maximus).

Indeterminate theropod remains have been recovered in Utah, with indeterminate ceratosaur remains formerly considered referable to Elaphrosaurus recovered in Colorado. Indeterminate theropod tracks have been recovered from both Utah and Arizona.

=== Allosauroidea ===
Color key: Taxon / Reclassified taxon / Taxon falsely reported as present / Dubious taxon or junior synonym / Ichnotaxon / Ootaxon / Morphotaxon

Notes
Uncertain or tentative taxa are in small text
~~crossed out~~ taxa are discredited.

Genus	Species	Locality	Material	Notes	Images
Allosaurus	A. fragilis	Colorado, New Mexico, Oklahoma, South Dakota, Utah and Wyoming, Brushy Basin member	"At least [three] complete skulls, many partial skulls and skull elements, many partial and complete skeletons representing at least 60 individuals." It was the most common large carnivore in the area.		Allosaurus fragilis
Allosaurus	A. jimmadseni	Wyoming and Utah, Brushy Basin and Salt Wash members	At least 15 specimens, including several skulls.		
Allosaurus	A. anax	Oklahoma, Kenton Member	Postorbital and partial postcranial material		Allosaurus anax
Antrodemus	A. valens	Colorado	Half of a proximal caudal centrum	Considered dubious due to fragmentary remains.	
Creosaurus	C. atrox	Wyoming, Brushy Basin member	A fragmentary skull and assorted postcrania.	Considered a junior synonym of Allosaurus.	
Epanterias	E. amplexus	Colorado, Brushy Basin member	Several fragmentary postcranial elements of 2 individuals, possible additional remains known from Wyoming.	Considered dubious due to fragmentary remains.	
Labrosaurus	L. lucaris	Wyoming, Brushy Basin member	A fragmentary skull and several postcranial elements.	Junior synonym of A. fragilis.	
Labrosaurus	L. ferox	Wyoming, Brushy Basin member	A partial skull, dentaries, and fragmentary postcrania.	Known from one specimen with several pathologies. Today considered a junior synonym of A. fragilis.	

=== Ceratosaurs ===
Color key: Taxon / Reclassified taxon / Taxon falsely reported as present / Dubious taxon or junior synonym / Ichnotaxon / Ootaxon / Morphotaxon

Notes
Uncertain or tentative taxa are in small text
~~crossed out~~ taxa are discredited.

Genus	Species	Locality	Material	Notes	Images
Ceratosaurus	C. dentisulcatus	Utah	"Partial skull, vertebrae, [and] limb elements."	Large ceratosaurs grew to lengths of about 6–7 meters (20–23 ft) in length with large nasal horns on their snouts as well as two smaller horns above the eyes.	Ceratosaurus nasicornis
Ceratosaurus	C. magnicornis	Colorado	"Skull [and] assorted postcrania."	Large ceratosaurs grew to lengths of about 6–7 meters (20–23 ft) in length with large nasal horns on their snouts as well as two smaller horns above the eyes.	Ceratosaurus nasicornis
Ceratosaurus	C. nasicornis	Colorado and Utah, Brushy Basin member	Remains of "5 individuals, including [a] nearly complete adult skeleton and subadult skeleton."	Large ceratosaurs grew to lengths of about 6–7 meters (20–23 ft) in length with large nasal horns on their snouts as well as two smaller horns above the eyes.	Ceratosaurus nasicornis
Ceratosaurus	Indeterminate.	Wyoming		Large ceratosaurs grew to lengths of about 6–7 meters (20–23 ft) in length with large nasal horns on their snouts as well as two smaller horns above the eyes.	Ceratosaurus nasicornis
Ceratosauria	Indeterminate.	Colorado		Previously referred to Elaphrosaurus, these remains are probably not referable to that genus and are best considered indeterminate beyond Ceratosauria.	
Elaphrosaurus	Intermediate	Colorado		Now thought to be indeterminate beyond Ceratosauria.	
Fosterovenator	F. churei	Wyoming	Tibia, astragalus, fibula.	A fragmentary theropod which may be a ceratosaurid.	

=== Coelurosaurs ===
Coelurosaurs, the group of theropods most closely related to and including birds, included Coelurus fragilis, Ornitholestes hermanni, Tanycolagreus topwilsoni, the possible troodontid Koparion douglassi, the definite troodontid Hesperornithoides, and the early tyrannosauroid Stokesosaurus clevelandi.

Color key: Taxon / Reclassified taxon / Taxon falsely reported as present / Dubious taxon or junior synonym / Ichnotaxon / Ootaxon / Morphotaxon

Notes
Uncertain or tentative taxa are in small text
~~crossed out~~ taxa are discredited.

Genus	Species	Locality	Material	Notes	Images
Alvarezsauroidea indet.	Indeterminate	Wyoming	Two cervical vertebrae and an astragalus	An early alvarezsauroid filling a gap in the clade's fossil record. The material was originally classified as part of the Coelurus fragilis hypodigm.	
Coelurus	C. fragilis	Utah and Wyoming, Brushy Basin member	A partial skeleton in several syntypes and several fragmentary referred specimens.	A basal coelurosaurian about 2.3 metres (7.5 feet) long.	Coelurus fragilis
Coelurus	Indeterminate	Colorado		A basal coelurosaurian about 2.3 metres (7.5 feet) long.	Coelurus fragilis
Hesperornithoides	H. miessleri	Wyoming		An early troodontid.	Hesperornithoides miessleri
Koparion	K. douglassi	Utah		A small theropod thought to be one of the oldest known troodontids.	Koparion douglassi
Ornitholestes	O. hermanni	Wyoming	"Skull and associated postcranial skeleton."	A small basal coelurosaurian about 2 metres (6.6 feet) long.	Ornitholestes hermanni
Palaeopteryx	P. thomsoni	Colorado, Brushy Basin member	A distal radius		
Stokesosaurus	S. clevelandi	Utah	"Illium, associated elements and pelvic cranial material. [sic]"	A possible early tyrannosauroid about 4 metres (13 feet) in length.	Stokesosaurus clevelandi
Tanycolagreus	T. topwilsoni	Wyoming and Utah		A basal coelurosaurian about 3.4 metres (11 feet) long, similar in appearance to Coelurus.	Tanycolagreus topwilsoni

=== Megalosauroids ===
Color key: Taxon / Reclassified taxon / Taxon falsely reported as present / Dubious taxon or junior synonym / Ichnotaxon / Ootaxon / Morphotaxon

Notes
Uncertain or tentative taxa are in small text
~~crossed out~~ taxa are discredited.

Genus	Species	Locality	Material	Notes	Images
Edmarka	E. rex	Wyoming		Possibly a junior synonym of Torvosaurus tanneri.	
Marshosaurus	M. bicentesimus	Colorado and Utah	Partial skeleton, including part of a skull.	A medium-sized piatnitzkysaurid megalosauroid about 6 metres (20 feet) in length.	Marshosaurus bicentesimus
Torvosaurus	T. tanneri	Colorado, Utah and Wyoming, Brushy Basin member	"Partial skeletons of at least [three] individuals."	A large, robust megalosaurid reaching lengths of up to 9 m (30 ft). One of the largest carnivores of the formation.	Torvosaurus tanneri

== Eggs ==
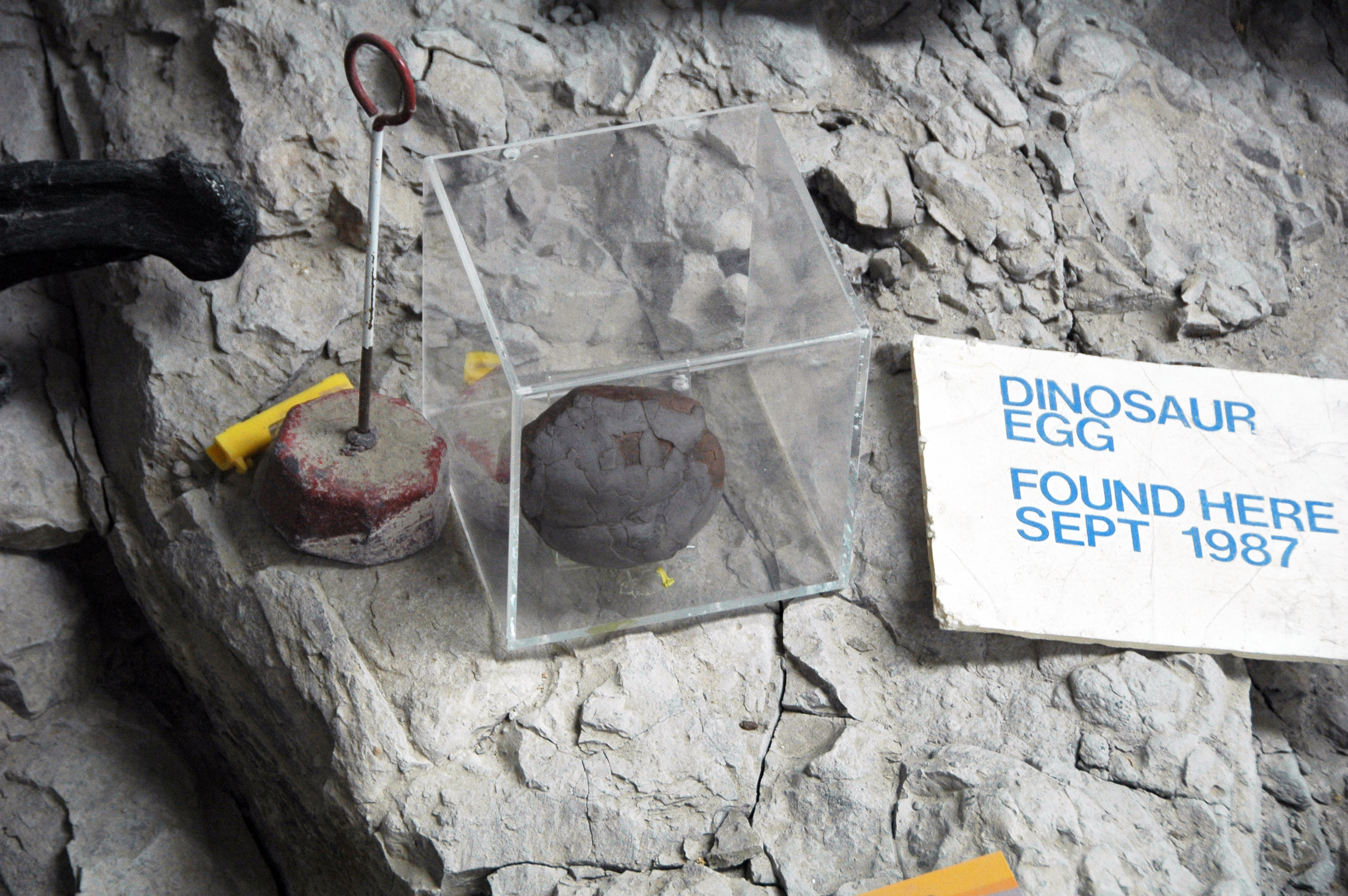
Egg from the Cleveland-Lloyd Dinosaur Quarry

Dinosaur eggs have been found in Utah.

== Tracks ==
=== Ornithopods ===
Morrison ornithopod trace fossils are represented by three toed tracks which are generally small. The toes of Morrison ornithopod tracks are usually more widely splayed than the theropod tracks preserved in the formation.

=== Stegosaurs ===
Stegosaur tracks were first recognized in 1996 from a hindprint-only trackway discovered at the Cleveland-Lloyd quarry, which is located near Price, Utah. Two years later, a new ichnogenus called Stegopodus was erected for another set of stegosaur tracks which were found near Arches National Park, also in Utah. Unlike the first, this trackway preserved traces of the forefeet. Fossil remains indicate that stegosaurs have five digits on the forefeet and three weight-bearing digits on the hind feet. From this, scientists were able to successfully predict the appearance of stegosaur tracks in 1990, six years in advance of the first actual discovery of Morrison stegosaur tracks. Since the erection of Stegopodus, more trackways have been found, however none have preserved traces of the front feet, and stegosaur traces remain rare.

=== Theropods ===
Indeterminate theropod tracks have been recovered from both Utah and Arizona.
