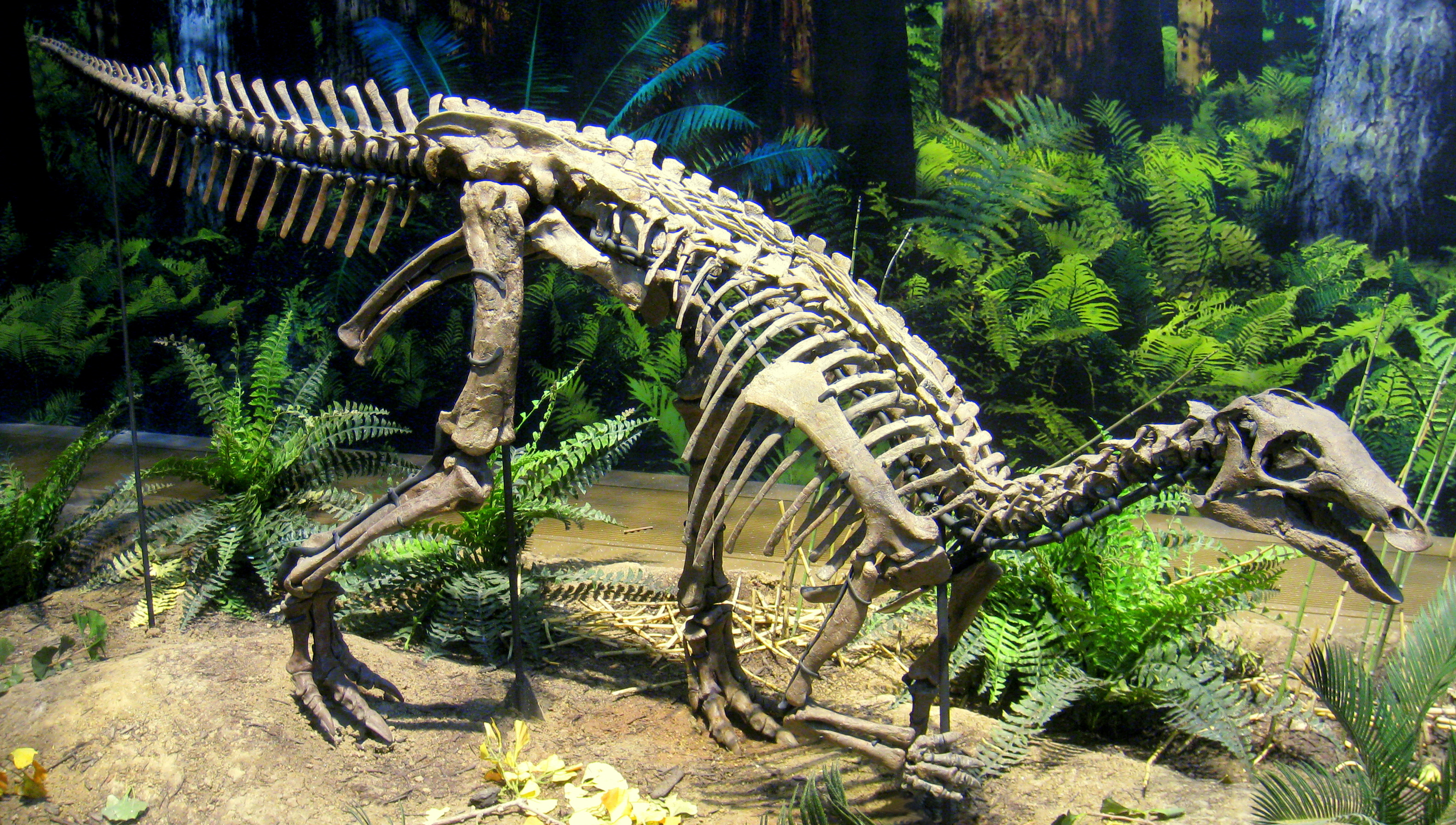
- Skeleton at the Carnegie Museum

Scientific classification
- Kingdom: Animalia
- Phylum: Chordata
- Class: Reptilia
- Clade: Dinosauria
- Clade: †Ornithischia
- Clade: †Ornithopoda
- Clade: †Ankylopollexia
- Clade: †Styracosterna
- Genus: †Uteodon; McDonald, 2011
- Species: †U. aphanoecetes

Binomial name
- †Uteodon aphanoecetes (Carpenter & Wilson, 2008)

Synonyms
- Camptosaurus aphanoecetes Carpenter & Wilson, 2008

= Uteodon =

Uteodon Temporal range: Late Jurassic, ~150.91–150.04 Ma

Genus of reptiles (fossil)

Uteodon (meaning "Ute tooth") is a genus of herbivorous iguanodontian dinosaur. It is a basal iguanodontian which lived during the late Jurassic period (Tithonian age) in what is now Uintah County, Utah. It is known from the middle of the Brushy Basin Member, Morrison Formation. The genus was named by Andrew T. McDonald in 2011 and the type species is U. aphanoecetes.

== History ==
The holotype specimen, CM 11337 (a virtually complete skeleton minus the skull and tail), was assigned to Camptosaurus medius (Marsh, 1894) by Charles W. Gilmore in 1925. When C. medius was synonymised with Camptosaurus dispar in 1980, the holotype was seen to probably represent a new, then unnamed, species of Camptosaurus. The species Camptosaurus aphanoecetes was first described in 2008 by Carpenter and Wilson. In 2011, it was assigned to the new genus Uteodon. In 2015, the Uteodon braincase was referred to Dryosaurus, and Uteodon and Cumnoria were synonymized with Camptosaurus, as C. aphanoectes and C. prestwichii, respectively.

== Description ==
Size comparison based on Hartman (2013)

The type specimen of Uteodon was 3.75 metres (12.3 ft) in length but was not fully grown, Uteodon would have grown up to around 6 metres (20 ft) long and would probably have weighed no more than around 400 kilograms (880 lb).

== Paleoecology ==
=== Provenance and occurrence ===
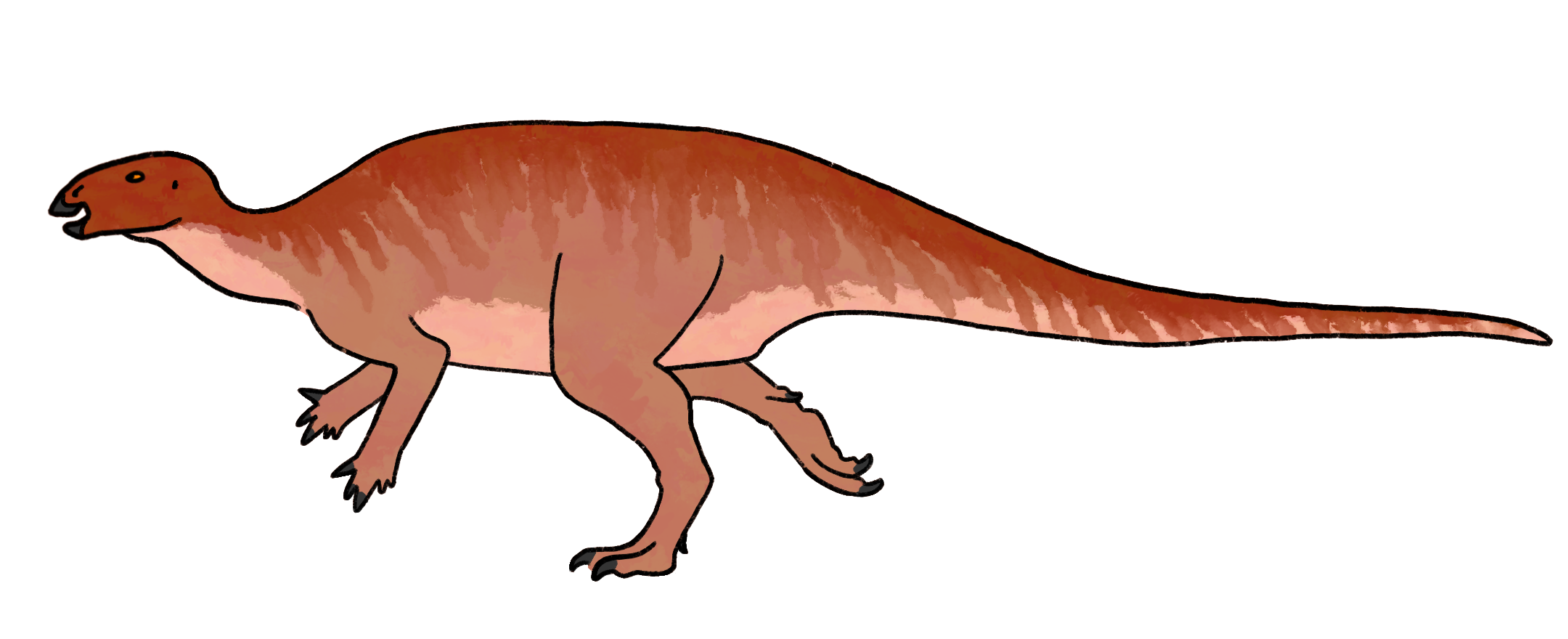
Life restoration

The single known specimen of Uteodon, CM 11337, was found in the Carnegie Quarry/Douglass Quarry of the Brushy Basin Member of the Morrison Formation, Utah. The rocks it was found in were medium-grained, coarse sandstone that was deposited during the Tithonian and Kimmeridgian stages of the Late Jurassic period, approximately 150.91 to 150.04 million years ago.

=== Fauna and habitat ===
Paleoenvironment and dinosaurs of the Morrison Formation, with two C. aphanoecetes at middle left

Studies suggest that the paleoenvironment of this section of the Morrison Formation included rivers that flowed from the west into a basin that contained a giant, saline alkaline lake and there were extensive wetlands in the vicinity. The Dry Mesa Dinosaur Quarry of western Colorado yields one of the most diverse Upper Jurassic vertebrate assemblages in the world. The Dry Mesa Quarry has produced the remains of the sauropods Apatosaurus, Diplodocus, Barosaurus, Supersaurus, and Camarasaurus, the ornithopods Camptosaurus and Dryosaurus, and the theropods Allosaurus, Torvosaurus. Tanycolagreus, Koparion, Stokesosaurus, Ceratosaurus, and Ornitholestes, as well as Nanosaurus, Gargoyleosaurus, and Stegosaurus.

The flora of the period has been revealed by fossils of green algae, fungi, mosses, horsetails, ferns, cycads, ginkgoes, and several families of conifers. Animal fossils discovered include bivalves, snails, ray-finned fishes, frogs, salamanders, amphibians, turtles, sphenodonts, lizards, terrestrial (like Hoplosuchus) and aquatic crocodylomorphs, cotylosaurs, several species of pterosaurs like Harpactognathus, and early mammals, multituberculates, symmetrodonts, and triconodonts.
