= Garden Park, Colorado =

Paleontological site in Colorado, US

Coordinates: 38°34′24″N 105°13′31″W

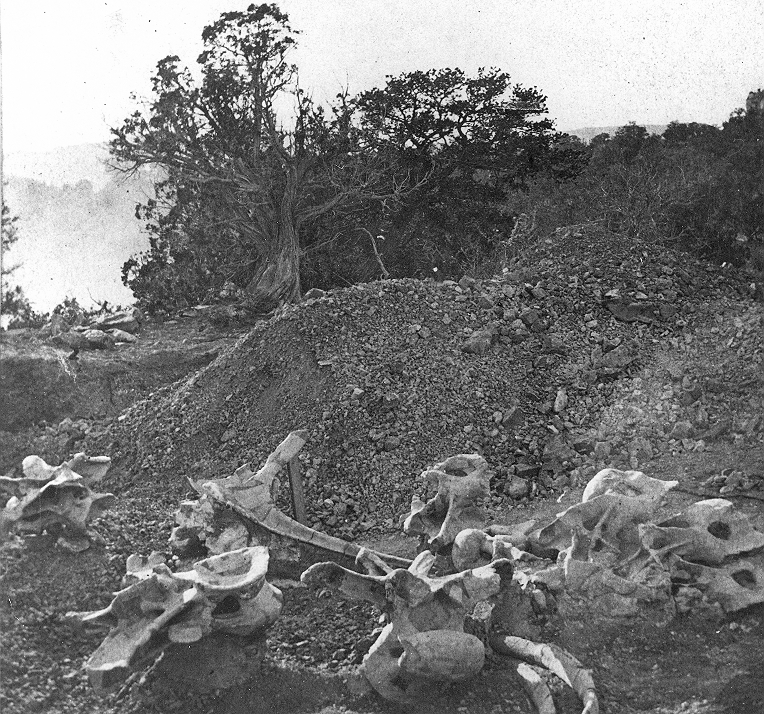
One of the few photographs taken shortly after the discovery of dinosaur bones in the Garden Park area. These bones are of the first Camarasaurus supremus skeleton being excavated by Oramel Lucas for E. D. Cope

Garden Park is a paleontological site in Fremont County, Colorado, known for its Jurassic dinosaurs and the role the specimens played in the infamous Bone Wars of the late 19th century. Located 10 km (6.2 mi) north of Cañon City, the name originates from the area providing vegetables to the miners at nearby Cripple Creek in the 19th century. Garden Park proper is a triangular valley surrounded by cliffs on the southeast and southwest and by mountains to the north; however, the name is also refers to the dinosaur sites on top and along the cliffs. The dinosaur sites now form the Garden Park Paleontological Resource Area, which is overseen by the Bureau of Land Management.

== Geology ==
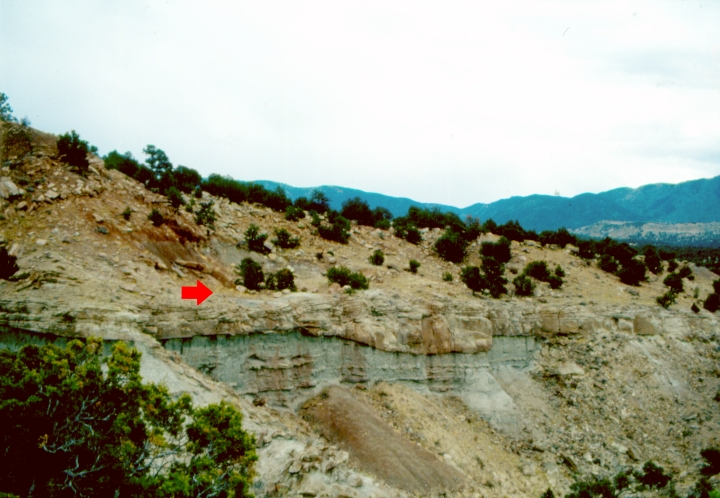
Felch Quarry 1 (Marsh-Felch Quarry) in the Garden Park Paleontological Resource Area. Discovered in 1877, this site produced numerous holotypes of dinosaurs, which were named by O. C. Marsh. Most of the specimens are at the National Museum of Natural History in Washington, D.C.

Garden Park was formed by erosion of sedimentary rocks that have been distorted by uplift of the Rocky Mountains. The region is bisected by Four Mile Creek (also called Oil Creek), which has carved a canyon through the Mesozoic and Paleozoic sedimentary rocks. One of these Mesozoic strata is the Morrison Formation, which is exposed within the canyon. However, because the formation contains high amounts of swelling clays, large faulted blocks or slump-blocks of the formation are slowly moving towards the creek. The result is to make it difficult to correlate the various dinosaur quarries because exposures are limited and not continuous.

The formation in Garden Park can be divided informally into a lower and upper unit. The lower unit is composed primarily green and gray mudstones, with numerous lenticular, white to tan to gray sandstones. The upper is composed mostly of red mudstone, with lesser amounts of yellowish, often tabular sandstone. These two units probably correspond to the Tidwell, Saltwash and Brushy Basin members of the Morrison Formation on the Colorado Plateau.

== Dinosaurs ==
The discovery of dinosaurs in the Garden Park area has been presented numerous times by Schuchert and LeVene, Shur, Ostrom and McIntosh, and Jaffe. Othniel Charles Marsh and Edward Drinker Cope both produced major finds here. The lesser known post-Marsh and Cope collecting of dinosaurs has been presented by Monaco. She recounts the expeditions by the Carnegie Museum of Natural History in the early 20th century, the Denver Museum of Natural History in the 1930 and 1990s, and the Cleveland Museum of Natural History in the mid-1950s.

Dinosaurs from Garden Park on display include Allosaurus fragilis, Diplodocus longus, Ceratosaurus nasicornis, and Stegosaurus stenops at the National Museum of Natural History, Haplocanthosaurus delfsi at the Cleveland Museum of Natural History, and Othnielosaurus consors (then called Othnielia rex), Stegosaurus stenops and a clutch of Preprismatoolithus coloradensis eggs at the Denver Museum of Nature and Science.

== Major vertebrate quarries ==
references (h) = holotype

=== Cleveland Museum of Natural History Quarry ===
Reptilia
Testudines

Amphichelydia

Glyptops ornatus

Crocodilia

Mesosuchia

Eutretauranosuchus delfsi

Dinosauria
Saurischia

Sauropoda

Haplocanthosaurus delfsi

=== Cope's Quarries ===
CS 1 (Cope's Nipple = Saurian Hill)

Dinosauria
Saurischia

Sauropoda

Camarasaurus supremus (h)

Quarry 1

Dinosauria
Saurischia

Theropoda

Quarry 2

Dinosauria
Saurischia

Sauropoda

Camarasaurus supremus

Theropoda

Epanterias amplexus (h) nomen dubium (now Allosaurus)

Ornithischia

Stegosauria
Hypsirophus discurus

Quarry 3

Dinosauria
Saurischia

Sauropoda

Amphicoelias fragillimus (h) (now Maraapunisaurus)

Quarry 4

Dinosauria
Saurischia

Sauropoda

Symphyrophus musculosus (h) nomen dubium

Quarry 5 (=Denver Museum of Natural History Camarasaurus)

Dinosauria
Saurischia

Sauropoda

Camarasaurus supremus

Quarry 6

Dinosauria
Saurischia

Sauropoda

Camarasaurus supremus

Quarry 7

Dinosauria
Saurischia

Sauropoda

Amphicoelias sp.
Camarasaurus supremus

Quarry 8 (CS 2; The Fort)

Dinosauria
Saurischia

Sauropoda

Camarasaurus supremus

Quarry 9

Dinosauria
Saurischia

Sauropoda?

Quarry 10

Dinosauria
Saurischia

Sauropoda?

Quarry 11

Dinosauria
Saurischia

Sauropoda?

Quarry 12

Dinosauria
Saurischia

Sauropoda

Amphicoelias altus (h)

Quarry 13

Dinosauria indeterminate

Quarry 14

Dinosauria
Saurischia

Sauropoda

Camarasaurus supremus

Quarry 15 (Oil Tract)

Dinosauria
Saurischia

Sauropoda

Amphicoelias latus (h) (now Camarasaurus grandis)

The following cannot be assigned to specific quarries

Reptilia
Testudines

Amphichelydia

Glyptops plicatulus

Incertae sedis
Tichosteus lucasanus (h) nomen dubium
Tichosteus aequifacies (h) nomen dubium
Brachyrophus altarkansanus (h) nomen dubium
Dinosauria
Saurischia

Sauropoda

Caulodon diversidens (h) nomen dubium

Ornithischia

Stegosauria

Hypsirophus seeleyanus (h)

=== Denver Museum of Natural History ===
Deweese Quarry (DMNH)

Dinosauria
Saurischia

Sauropoda

Diplodocinae indeterminate

Egg Gulch

Dinosauria
Saurischia

Theropoda

Prismatoolithus coloradensis (eggs)

Ornithischia

Ornithopoda

Dryosauridae indeterminate

Kessler's Quarry

Reptilia
Testudines

Amphichelydia

Glyptops plicatus

Crocodilia

Mesoeucrocodylia

Goniopholididae indeterminate

Dinosauria
Saurischia

Theropoda

Torvosaurus sp.

Ornithischia

Ornithopoda

genus and species indeterminate

Stegosauria

Stegosaurus stenops

Lindsey Quarry

Amphibia
Anura
Reptilia
Testudines

Amphichelydia

Glyptops plicatus

Rhynchocephalia

Opisthias rarus

Dinosauria
Saurischia

Sauropoda

Camarasaurus grandis

Theropoda

Allosaurus fragilis

Ornithischia

Ornithopoda

genus and species indeterminate

Mammalia
Multituberculata

genus and species indeterminate

Meyer Site 1

Reptilia
Crocodilia

Mesosuchia

Goniopholididae indeterminate

Dinosauria
Saurischia

Sauropoda

genus and species indeterminate

Theropoda

Allosaurus sp.

Meyer Site 2

Dinosauria
Saurischia

Theropoda

Torvosaurus cf. T. tanneri

Meyer Site 3

Dinosauria
Saurischia

Sauropoda

Diplodocinae indeterminate

Not-A-Haplocanthosaurus Quarry

Dinosauria
Saurischia

Sauropoda

Diplodocidae indeterminate

Theropoda

genus and species indeterminate

Small's Quarry

Osteichthyes
Actinopterygii

genus and species indeterminate

Sarcopterygii

Dipnoi

Ceratodus guentheri

Reptilia
Testudines

Amphichelydia

Dinochelys whitei
Glyptops plicatus

Squamata

?Sauria indeterminate
Lacertilia

Pterosauria

Kepodactylus grandis (h)

Crocodylia

Mesosuchia

Goniopholididae indeterminate

Dinosauria
Saurischia

Sauropoda

Apatosaurinae indeterminate

Theropoda

Ceratosauria indeterminate
genus and species indeterminate

Ornithiscia

Ornithopoda

Dryosaurus altus

Stegosauria

Stegosaurus stenops

Ankylosauria

?Mymoorapelta sp.

Mammalia
Docodonta

Docodontidae

Docodon apoxys

Dryolestidae

new genus and species

Valley of Death Locality

Reptilia
Testudines

Amphichelydia

Glyptops plicatulus

Dinosauria
Saurischia

Sauropoda

Diplodocinae indeterminate

Ornithischia

Neornithischia

genus and species indeterminate

=== Marsh Quarries ===
Jennings and Johnson Locality

Reptilia
Crocodilia

Hallopus victor

Felch Quarry 1

Osteichthyes
Sarcopterygii

Dipnoi

Ceratodus guentheri

Reptilia
Testudines

Amphichelydia

Dinochelys whitei
Glyptops plicatulus

Crocodylia

Mesosuchia

Eutretauranosuchus sp.

Dinosauria
Saurischia

Sauropoda

Brachiosaurus sp.
Brontosaurus yahnahpin
Diplodocus longus (h)
Haplocanthosaurus priscus (h)
Haplocanthosaurus utterbacki (h) (=H. priscus)

Theropoda

Allosaurus fragilis (h)
Ceratosaurus nasicornis (h)
Coelurus fragilis
Ceratosauria indeterminate
Labrosaurus ferox (h) (now Allosaurus fragilis)

Ornithischia

Ornithopoda

Dryosaurus altus
Othnielia rex (h)

Stegosauria

Stegosaurus stenops (h)

Felch Quarry 2

Dinosauria
Saurischia

Sauropoda

Diplodocus longus

Lucas's Site

Reptilia
Crocodylia

Mesoeucrocodylia

Amphicotylus lucasii

Dinosauria
Ornithischia

Ornithopoda

Nanosaurus agilis (h)
