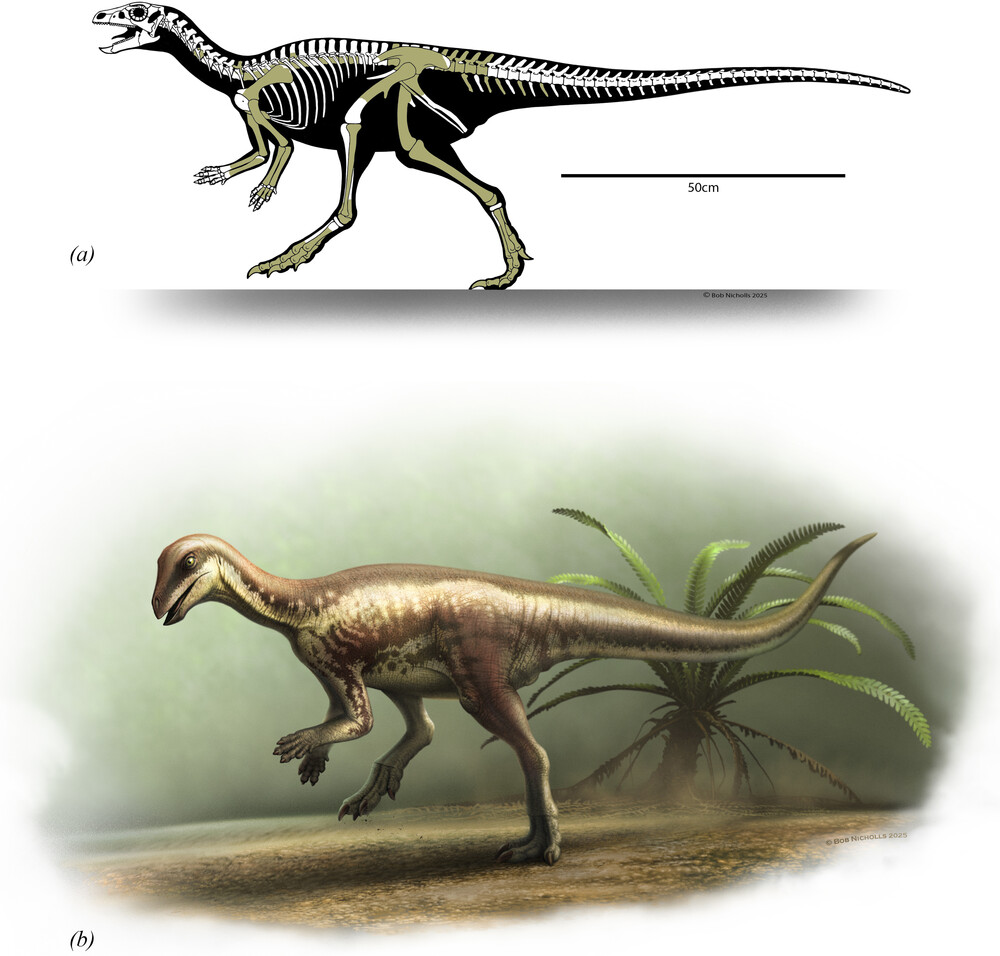
- Skeletal and life reconstructions

Scientific classification
- Kingdom: Animalia
- Phylum: Chordata
- Class: Reptilia
- Clade: Dinosauria
- Clade: †Ornithischia
- Clade: †Neornithischia
- Genus: †Enigmacursor; Maidment & Barrett, 2025
- Species: †E. mollyborthwickae

Binomial name
- †Enigmacursor mollyborthwickae Maidment & Barrett, 2025

= Enigmacursor =

Enigmacursor Temporal range: Late Jurassic, 155–148 Ma

Genus of ornithischian dinosaurs

Enigmacursor (meaning "puzzle runner") is an extinct genus of neornithischian dinosaur from the Late Jurassic Morrison Formation of Colorado, United States. The type species is Enigmacursor mollyborthwickae.

== Discovery and naming ==
Reconstructed mount of Enigmacursor at the Natural History Museum, London

The holotype specimen, NHMUK PV R 39000, was discovered between 2021 and 2022 in Moffat County, Colorado by private company Dinosaurs of America, LLC. and acquired by the Natural History Museum, London (NHM) in 2024. It represents a three-dimensionally preserved partial postcranial skeleton with associated teeth.

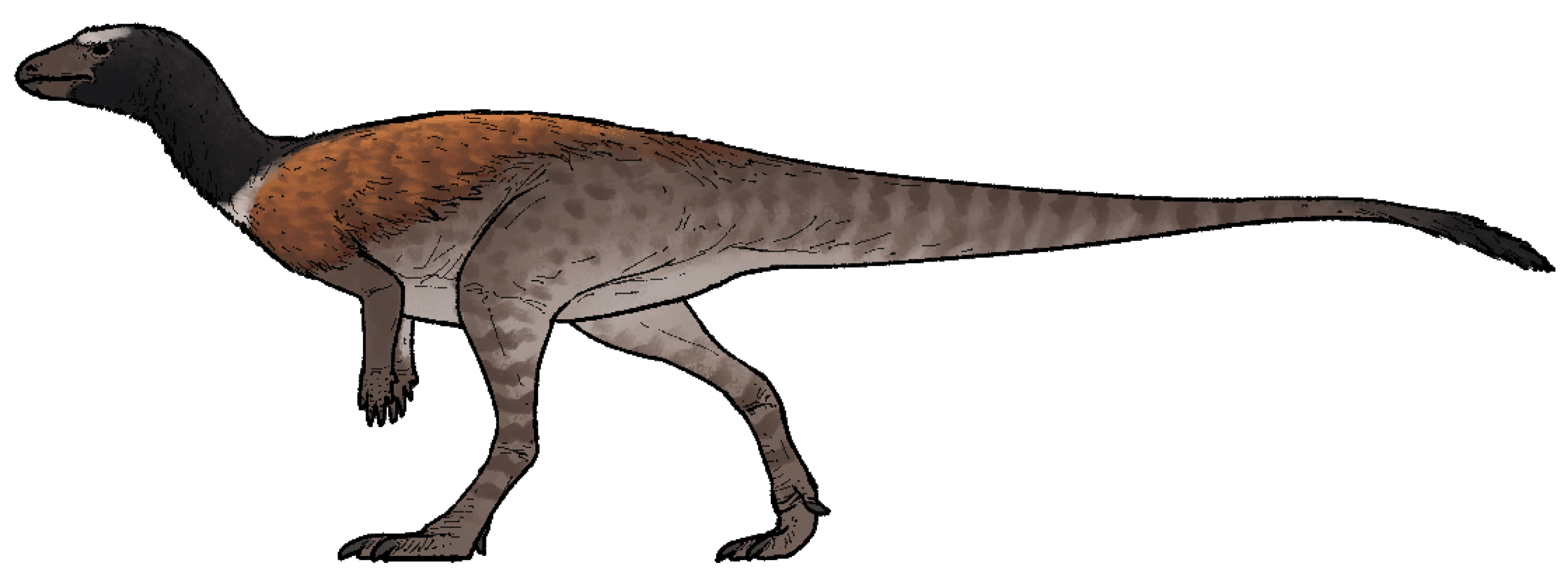
Speculative life restoration

It was described as a new genus and species by Susannah Maidment & Paul Barrett in 2025. The generic name, Enigmacursor, comes from the word enigma, referring to the taxonomic confusion of Morrison Formation neornithischians such as Nanosaurus, and the Latin word cursor, meaning "runner", after its cursorial hindlimbs. The specific name, mollyborthwickae, honors Molly Borthwick, who donated the funds for the acquisition of the specimen by the NHM.

The fossil that led to the scientific discovery was sold by natural history gallery David Aaron to the Natural History Museum, London, where it is now on display.

== Classification ==
Maidment & Barrett (2025) entered Enigmacursor into a phylogenetic analysis and placed as the sister taxon to the Chinese Yandusaurus. A cladogram adapted from their analysis is shown below:

- Neornithischia
  - Agilisaurus
  - - Hexinlusaurus
    - - - Yandusaurus
        - Enigmacursor
      - Cerapoda

== Paleoecology ==
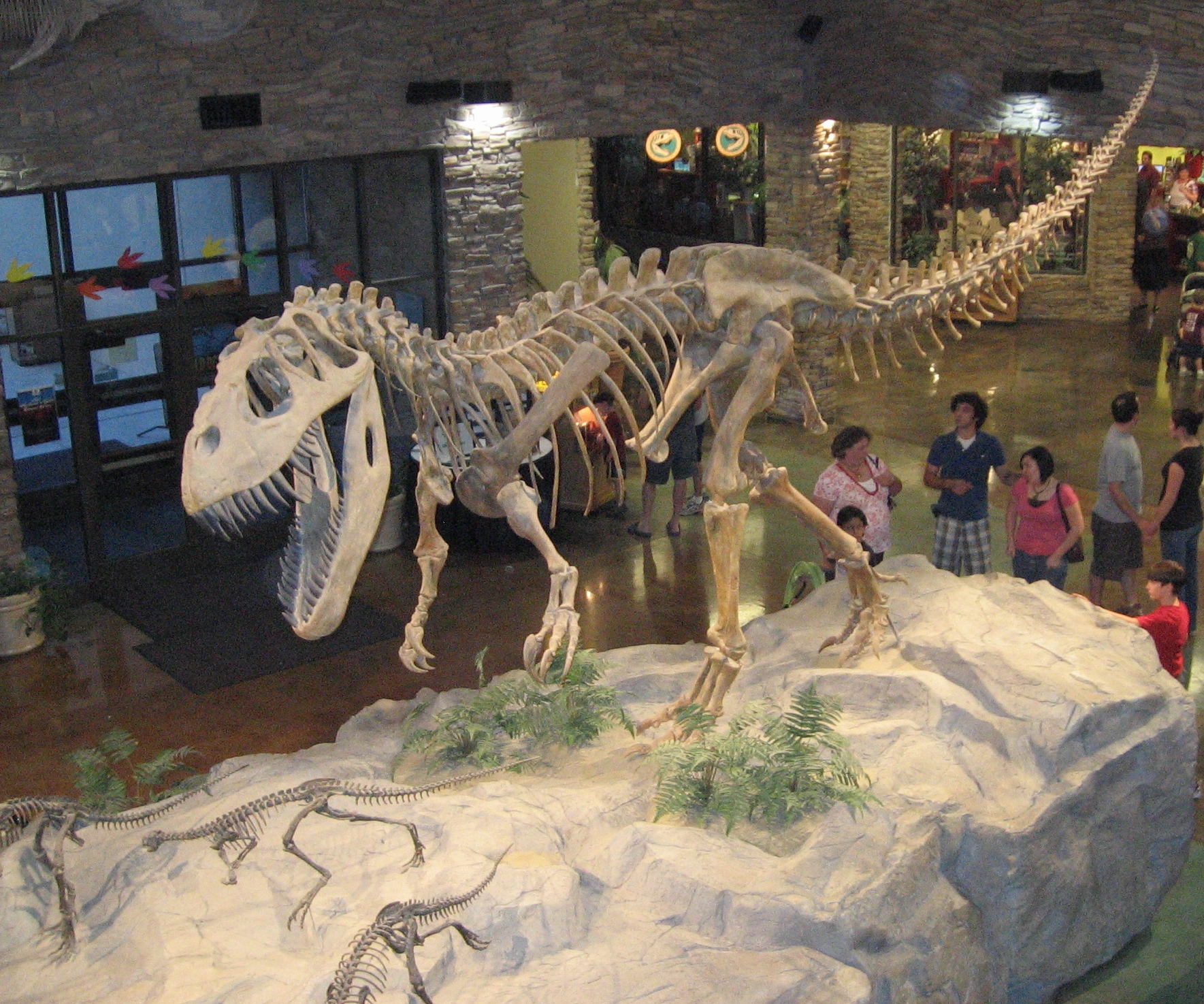
Torvosaurus skeleton mounted as if chasing small neornithischians

Enigmacursor was one of the smaller members of the diverse Morrison Formation dinosaur fauna, diminutive in comparison to the giant sauropods. The Morrison Formation is interpreted as a semiarid environment with distinct wet and dry seasons, and flat floodplains. Vegetation varied from river-lining gallery forests of conifers, tree ferns, and ferns, to fern savannas with rare trees. It has been a rich fossil hunting ground, holding fossils of green algae, fungi, mosses, horsetails, ferns, cycads, ginkgoes, and several families of conifers. Other fossils discovered include bivalves, snails, ray-finned fishes, frogs, salamanders, turtles, sphenodonts, lizards, terrestrial and aquatic crocodylomorphs, several species of pterosaur, numerous dinosaur species, and early mammals such as docodonts, multituberculates, symmetrodonts, and triconodonts. Such dinosaurs as the theropods Ceratosaurus, Allosaurus, Ornitholestes, and Torvosaurus, the sauropods Apatosaurus, Brachiosaurus, Camarasaurus, and Diplodocus, and the ornithischians Camptosaurus, Dryosaurus, and Stegosaurus are known from the Morrison.
