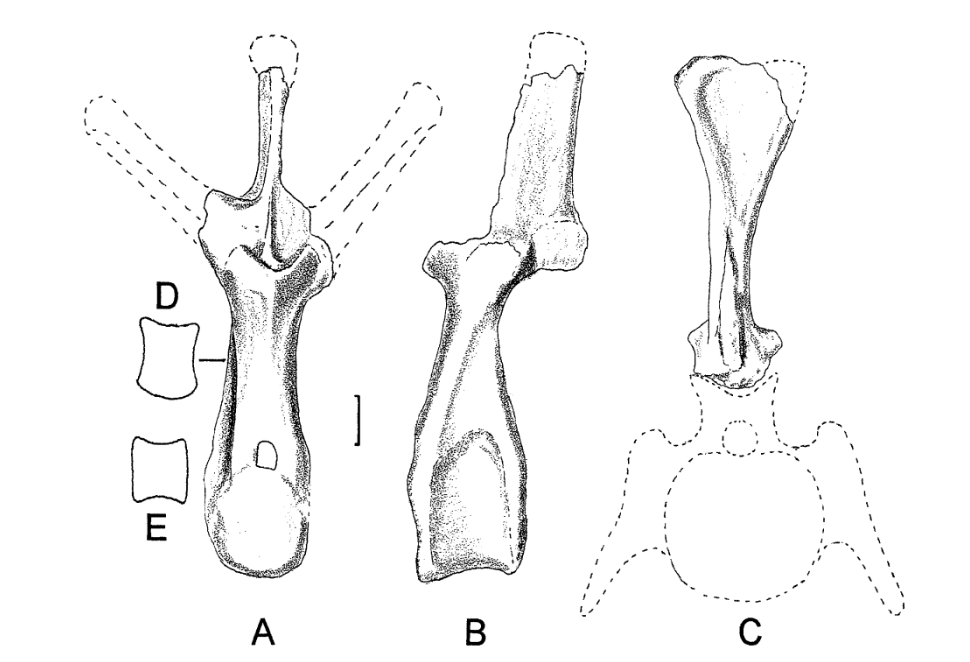
- Holotype vertebrae

Scientific classification
- Kingdom: Animalia
- Phylum: Chordata
- Class: Reptilia
- Clade: Dinosauria
- Clade: †Ornithischia
- Clade: †Thyreophora
- Clade: †Stegosauria
- Family: †Stegosauridae
- Subfamily: †Stegosaurinae
- Genus: †Hypsirophus; Cope, 1878

Type species
- †Hypsirophus discurus Cope, 1878

Synonyms
- Hypsirhophus (Cope, 1879) lapsus calami

= Hypsirophus =

Hypsirophus Temporal range: Late Jurassic, 146 Ma

Genus of dinosaurs

Hypsirophus (meaning "high roof") is a genus of stegosaurian dinosaurs. It contains a single species, Hypsirophus discurus, which is known only from a fragmentary specimen. The fossil consists of partial vertebrae from the back, three from the tail, and a piece of rib.

== History and classification ==
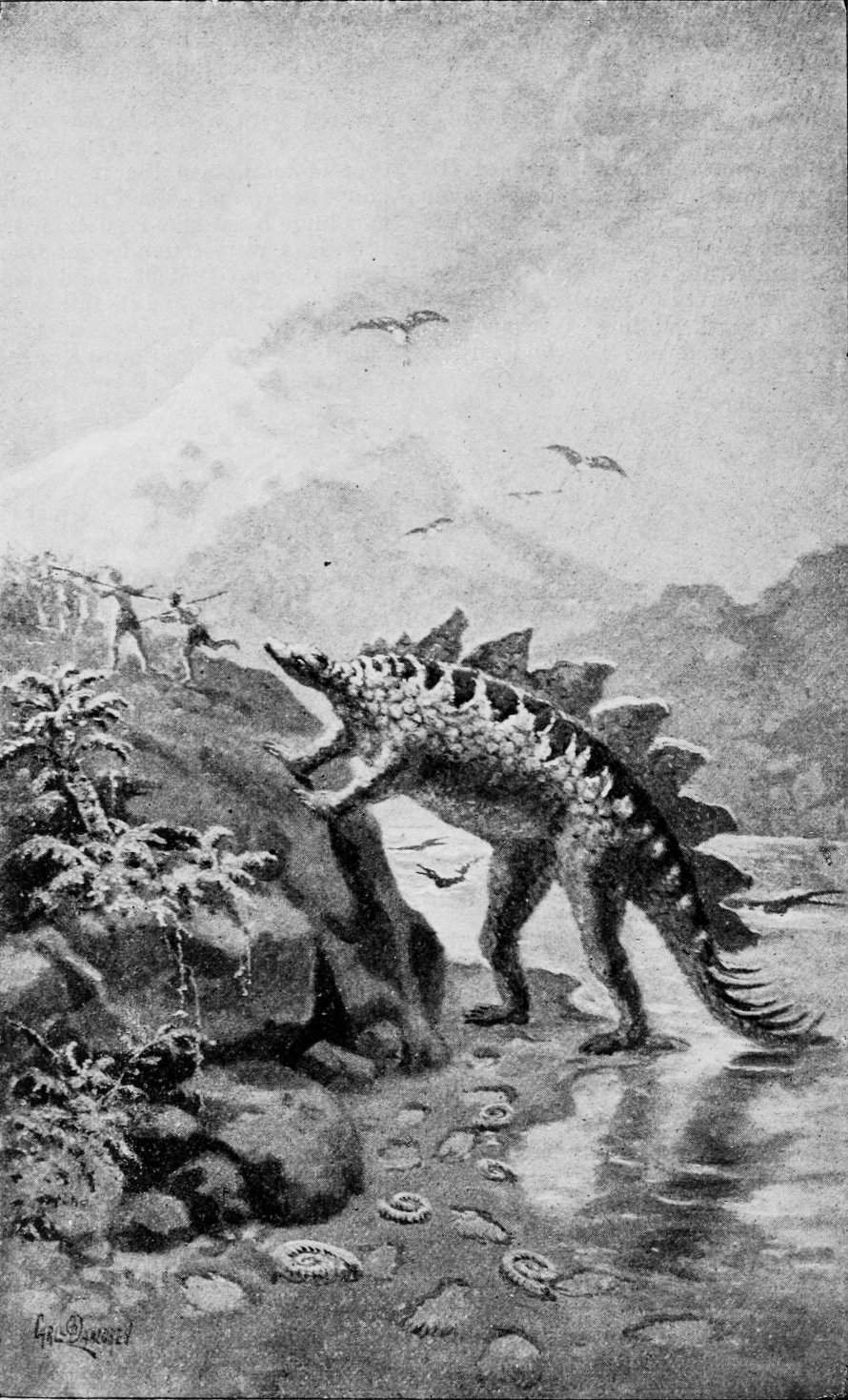
Outdated reconstruction from 1892

The first described fossils of Hypsirophus discurus were unearthed by schoolteacher Oramel William Lucas who working for Edward Drinker Cope at Cope's Quarry 3 near "Cope's Nipple" at Garden Park, a fossil site 3.8 miles northeast of Canon City, Colorado, and came from the Tithonian strata of uppermost part of the Upper Jurassic Morrison Formation. The fossils now accepted as Hypsirophus were fragmentary and came from one individual, containing: a dorsal vertebra, 2 partial neural spines, 2 caudal vertebral centra, and a rib fragment. These fossils were then sent to Cope, who briefly described them in 1878 as part of the Bone Wars, a competition between Cope and the Yale paleontologist Othniel Charles Marsh over fossils from the American West. Cope incorrectly grouped a theropod femur, possibly from Allosaurus, found nearby into the specimen causing him to believe it was a theropod related to Laelaps or Megalosaurus and possibly even synonymous with a species of the former that he described, Laelaps trihedrodon. The generic name of Hypsirophus means "high roof" after the tall anatomy of the dorsal vertebrae, while the specific name hasn't been translated. The next year in 1879, Cope named another species, Hypsirophus seeleyanus based on several vertebrae, limb bones, and teeth from an unknown locality in Colorado that have since been lost, but were theropod fossils instead of stegosaurian. Cope also inadequately named the species, making it a nomen nudum. The holotype of Hypsirophus discurus was transferred to the American Museum of Natural History after Cope's death in 1897, now catalogued under specimen number AMNH 5731.

It was not until many years later and the descriptions of complete Stegosaurus skeletons that Hypsirophus was classified as a stegosaur, with Cope's rival Marsh placing Hypsirophus in Stegosauridae in 1892. Some later researchers have considered Hypsirophus to be a synonym of Stegosaurus, or a nomen dubium, though Kenneth Carpenter and Peter Galton have suggested that it is distinct and valid based on differences in the vertebrae.

== Description ==
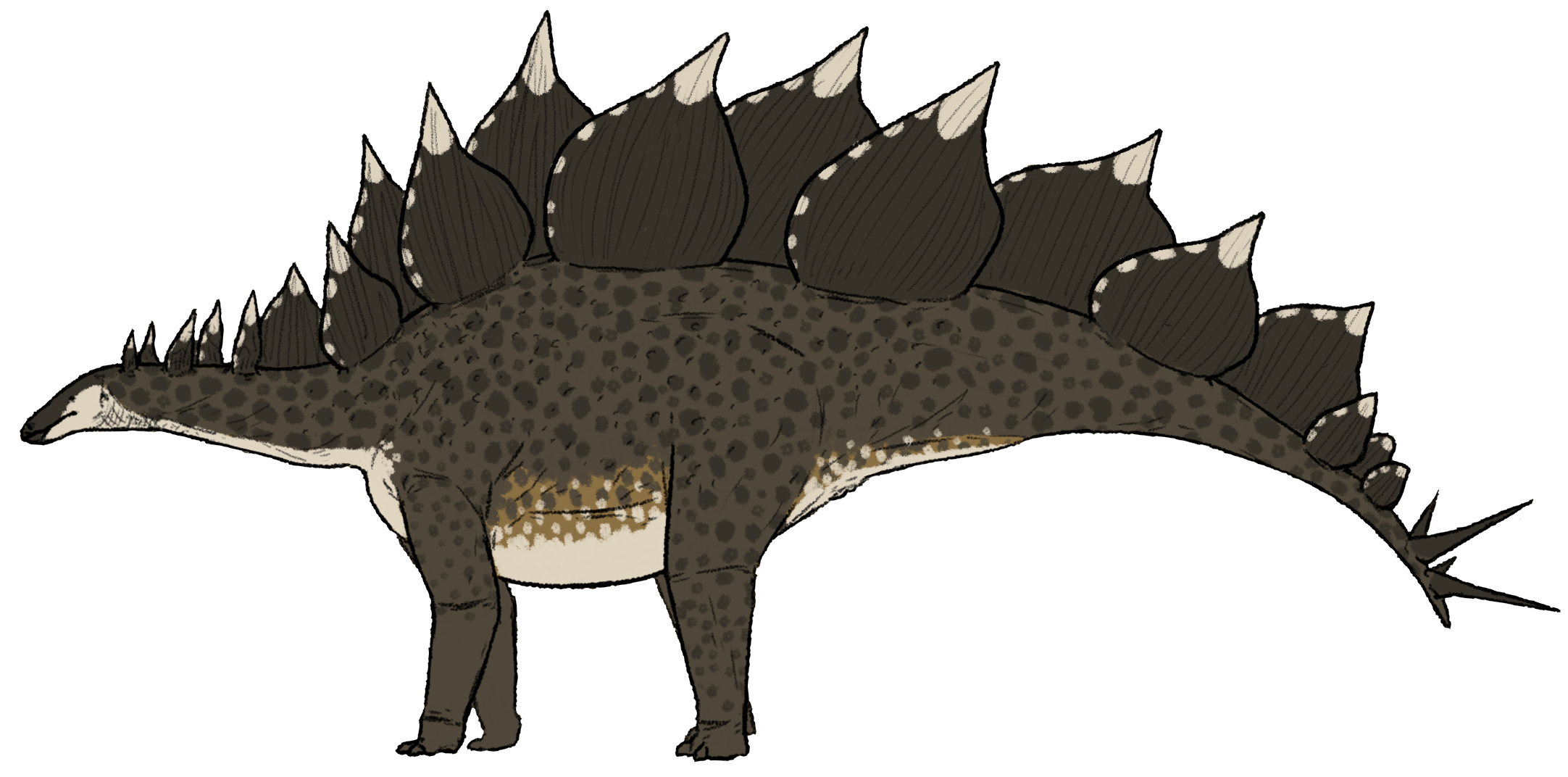
Hypothetical life restoration

Due to the fragmentary nature of the type specimen, lack of description, and the single known specimen, little is known from Hypsirophus. Kenneth Carpenter noted that it could be diagnosed by: Circular fossa between postzygapophyses in Hypsirophus versus vertical grooves in Stegosaurus, a median ridge extending from base of postzygapophyses to neural canal versus no ridge [a groove in Stegosaurus ungulatus (as S. stenops)], and in cross-section of pedicel, the anterior surface is convex versus being concave in Stegosaurus. The dorsal vertebrae are very tall, at 47 centimeters tall despite being incomplete and some of the largest dorsals known.
