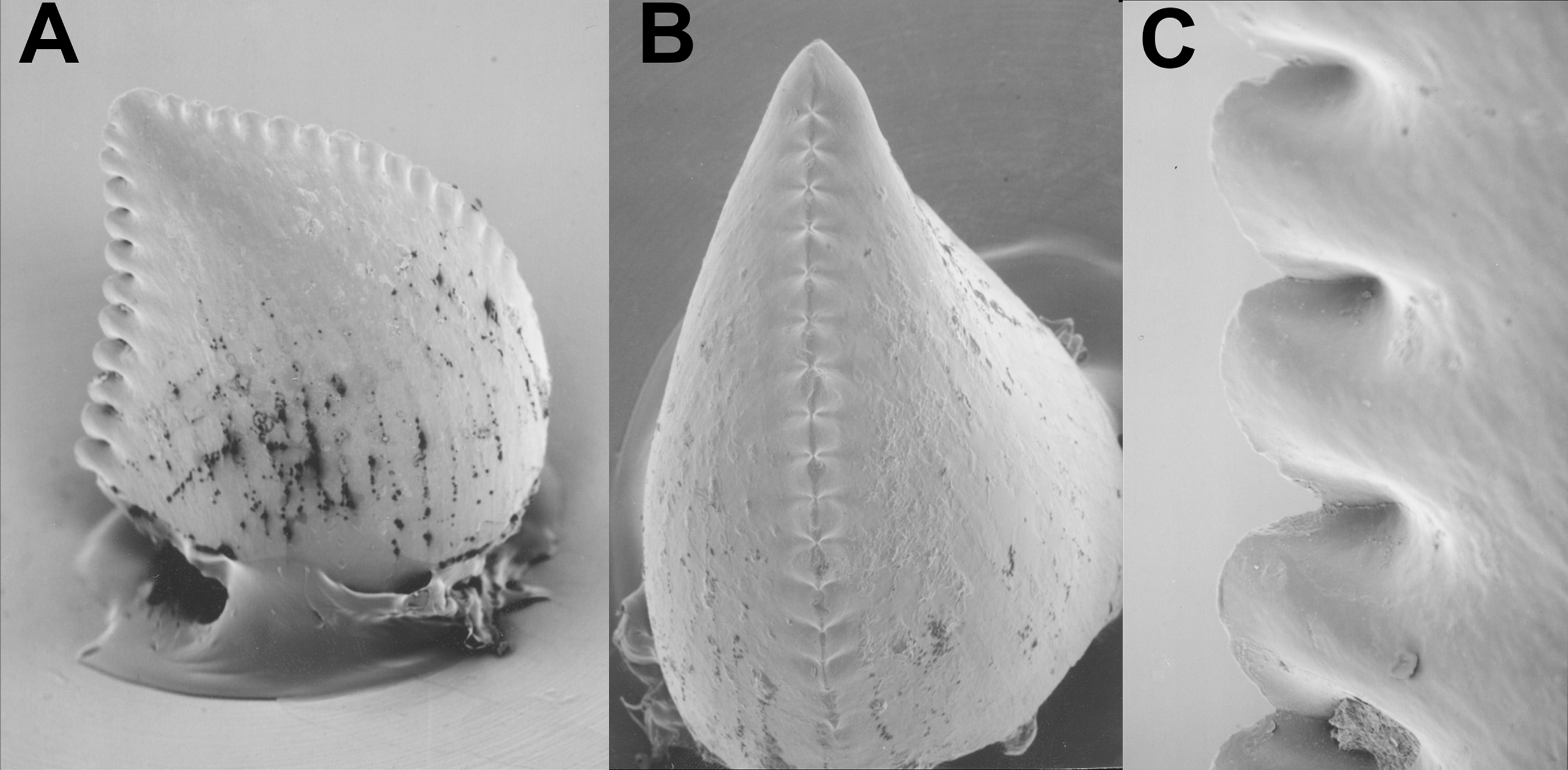
- Holotype tooth

Scientific classification
- Kingdom: Animalia
- Phylum: Chordata
- Class: Reptilia
- Clade: Dinosauria
- Clade: Saurischia
- Clade: Theropoda
- Family: †Troodontidae
- Genus: †Koparion; Chure, 1994

Type species
- Koparion douglassi Chure, 1994

= Koparion =

Koparion Temporal range: Late Jurassic, 151 Ma

Extinct genus of dinosaurs

Koparion is a genus of small coelurosaurian theropod dinosaur, from the late Jurassic Period (Kimmeridgian stage), of Utah. It contains the single named species Koparion douglassi which is known only from a single isolated tooth.

== Discovery ==
In 1993, Daniel Chure and Brooks Britt reported the discovery of small theropod remains, found by screenwashing large amounts of earth in the Rainbow Park near Dinosaur National Monument in Uintah County, Utah. In 1994, Chure named and described a unique tooth as the type specimen of the new species Koparion douglassi. The generic name Koparion comes from the Ancient Greek κοπάριον, "small surgical knife", in reference to the small size of the tooth. The specific name honors Earl Douglass, who, in the early twentieth century, excavated the Dinosaur National Monument quarry.

The holotype specimen, DINO 3353, was found in the Brushy Basin Member of the Morrison Formation dating from the late Kimmeridgian, about 151 million years old. The taxon is thus present in stratigraphic zone 6 of the Morrison Formation. The specimen consists of a single maxillary (upper cheek) tooth crown (the root is missing). It cannot be determined whether it represents a left or a right tooth.

== Description ==
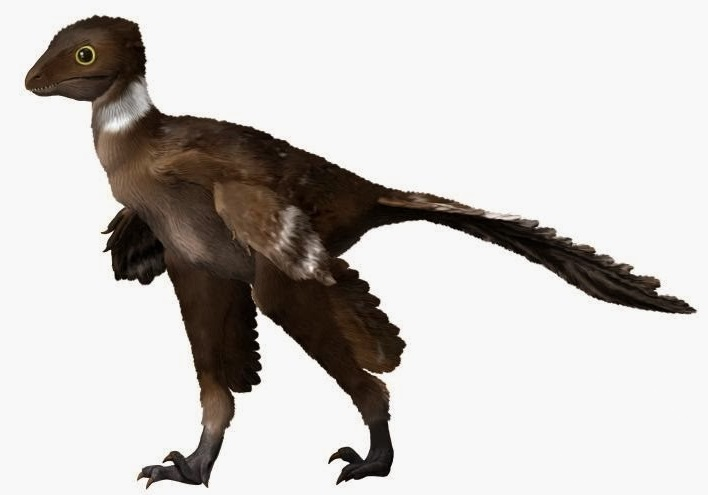
Hypothetical life restoration

The tooth is two millimeters tall and very recurved, with a strongly convex front edge and a nearly vertical back edge. The tooth is stout, with a maximum fore-aft length of 1.9 millimeters. Both edges are serrated, showing low rectangular denticles (individual serrations). The twelve denticles on the rear edge are much higher than the fourteen on the front edge, which cover only the nearly horizontal upper part of the front edge. The tooth base, though very wide, is constricted. The base is asymmetrical, with the right side in front view protruding much further than the left side; because it is not known whether it is a left or right tooth, it cannot be established what is the inner and what the outer side. The denticles are separated by "blood grooves", and "blood pits" are also present. The back denticles point obliquely upwards but have no hooked upper corners.

== Classification ==
Chure assigned Koparion to the Troodontidae based on the anatomy of the tooth. At that time, it was the oldest known troodontid, and is the first of that group discovered from the Jurassic. A troodontid presence in the Jurassic was predicted by the standard theory regarding the origin of birds, claiming that birds and troodontids are closely related (Chure suggested that they may even have been sister taxa, though this is not currently supported). Within this context, Koparion could be used to refute the temporal paradox argument, that such a close relationship were unlikely because the then oldest known bird, Archaeopteryx, lived much earlier than the Deinonychosauria, i.e. the Troodontidae and the Dromaeosauridae; later also non-fragmentary Jurassic troodontid material was reported, from China.

== See also ==
- List of dinosaurs
- Hesperornithoides - Another troodontid reported from the Jurassic.
- Timeline of troodontid research
