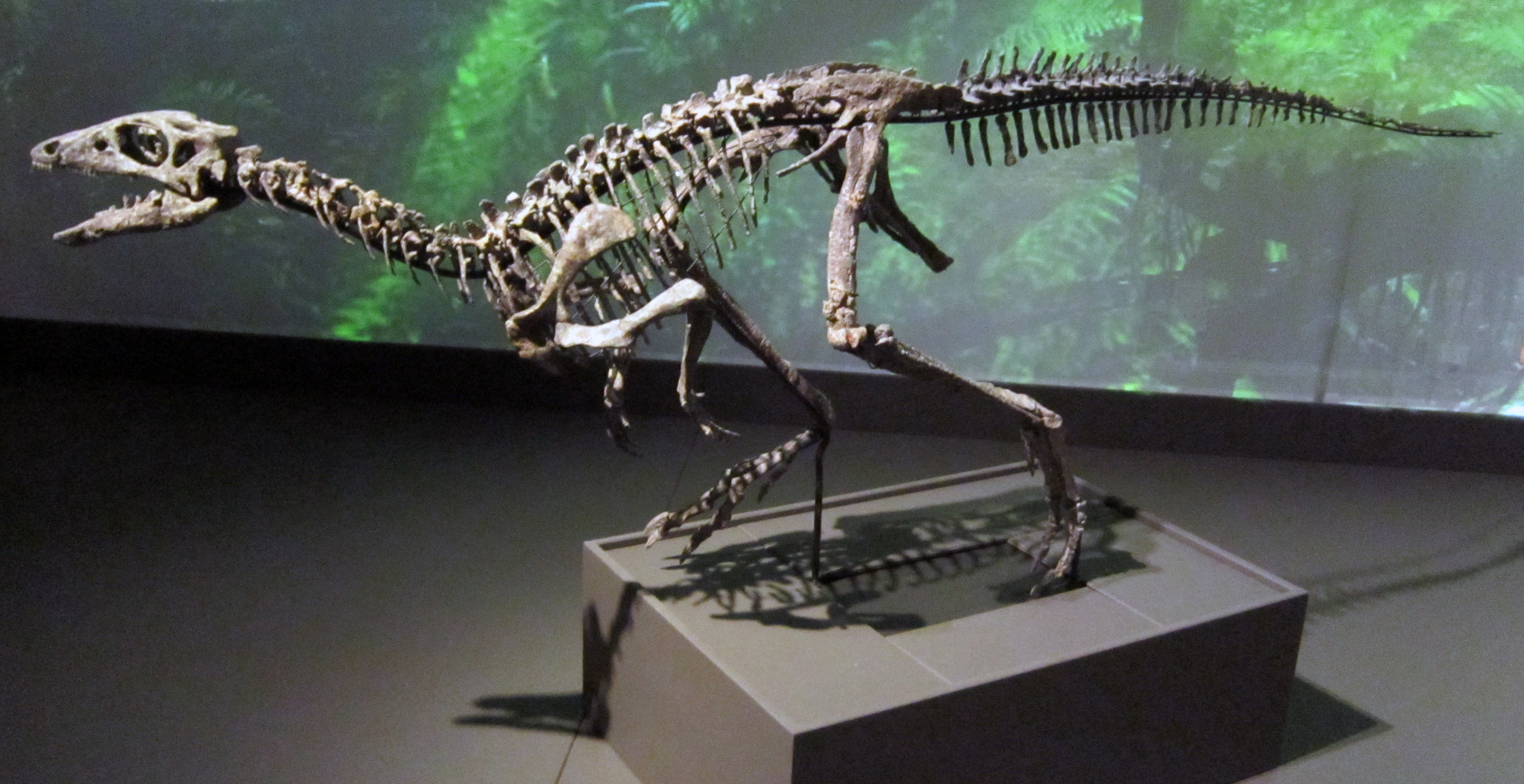
- Mounted skeleton, on temporary exhibit in the National Museum of Denmark

Scientific classification
- Kingdom: Animalia
- Phylum: Chordata
- Class: Reptilia
- Clade: Dinosauria
- Clade: †Ornithischia
- Clade: †Genasauria
- Clade: †Neornithischia
- Family: †Nanosauridae; Marsh, 1877
- Genus: †Nanosaurus; Marsh, 1877
- Species: †N. agilis

Binomial name
- †Nanosaurus agilis Marsh, 1877

Synonyms
- Genus synonymy: Drinker Bakker et al., 1990; Othnielia Galton, 1977; Othnielosaurus Galton, 2007; Species synonymy: Drinker nisti Bakker et al., 1990; Laosaurus consors Marsh, 1894; Nanosaurus rex Marsh, 1877; Othnielia rex (Marsh, 1877); Othnielosaurus consors (Marsh, 1894)

= Nanosaurus =

Nanosaurus Temporal range: Late Jurassic, 155–148 Ma

Extinct genus of dinosaurs

Nanosaurus ("small or dwarf lizard") is an extinct genus of neornithischian dinosaur that lived about 155 to 148 million years ago, during the Late Jurassic in North America. Its fossils are known from the Morrison Formation of the south-western United States. The type and only species, Nanosaurus agilis, was described and named by Othniel Charles Marsh in 1877. The taxon has a complicated taxonomic history, largely the work of Marsh and Peter M. Galton, involving the genera Laosaurus, Hallopus, Drinker, Othnielia, and Othnielosaurus, the latter three now being considered to be synonyms of Nanosaurus. It had historically been classified as a hypsilophodont or fabrosaur, types of generalized small bipedal herbivore, but more recent research has abandoned these groupings as paraphyletic and Nanosaurus is today considered a basal member of Neornithischia.

== History and taxonomy ==
=== Marsh's original groundwork ===
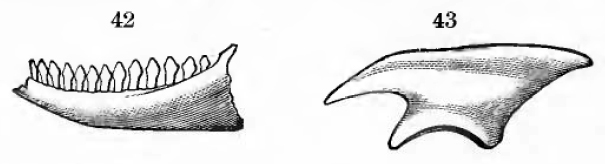
Holotype dentary and ilium

Nanosaurus has had a long and complicated taxonomic history. In 1877, Marsh named two species of Nanosaurus in separate publications, based on partial remains from the Morrison Formation of Garden Park, Colorado. One paper described N. agilis, based on YPM 1913, with remains including impressions of a dentary, and postcranial bits including an ilium, thigh bones, shin bones, and a fibula. The other paper named N. rex, a second species which Marsh based on YPM 1915 (also called 1925 in Galton, 2007), a complete thigh bone. He regarded both species as small ("fox-sized") animals. A third species, N. victor, was named, which he soon recognized to be something completely different, and is now known as the small, bipedal crocodylomorph Hallopus.

The next year, he named the new genus Laosaurus on material collected by Samuel Wendell Williston from Como Bluff, Wyoming. Two species were named: the type species L. celer, based on parts of eleven vertebrae (YPM 1875); and the "smaller" L. gracilis, originally based on a back vertebra's centrum, a caudal centrum, and part of an ulna (review by Peter Galton in 1983 finds the specimen to now consist of thirteen back and eight caudal centra, and portions of both hindlimbs). A third species, L. consors, was established by Marsh in 1894 for YPM 1882, which consists of most of one articulated skeleton and part of at least one other individual. The skull was only partially preserved, and the fact that the vertebrae were represented only by centra suggests a partially grown individual. Galton (1983) notes that much of the current mounted skeleton was restored in plaster, or had paint applied.

=== Galton's taxonomic revisions ===
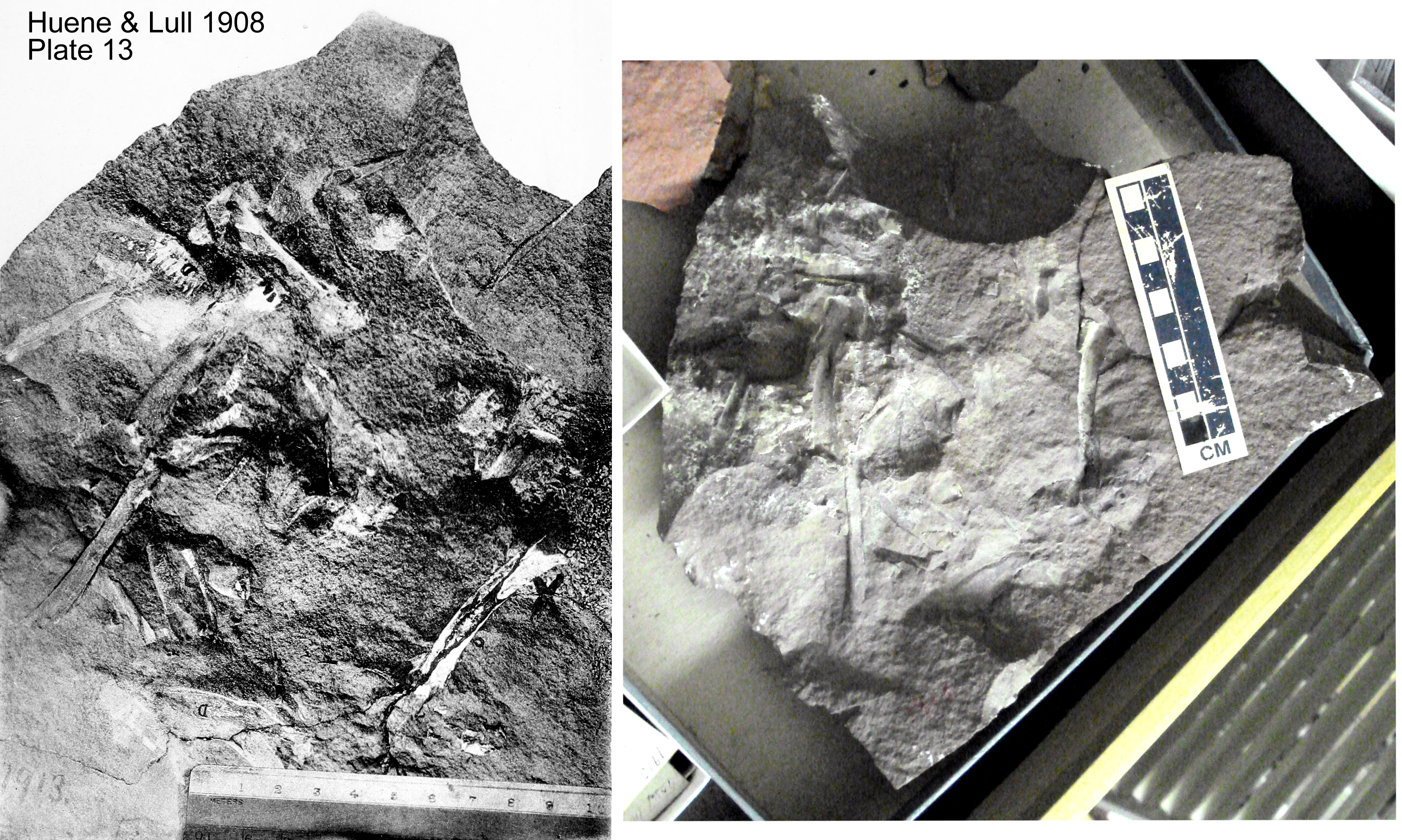
Type specimen of Nanosaurus agilis Marsh 1877 (YPM VP 1913) as illustrated in 1908 (left) and cast of the bone impressions after the fragmentary bone was removed (right)

These animals attracted little professional attention until the 1970s and 1980s, when Peter Galton reviewed many of the "hypsilophodonts" in a series of papers. In 1973, he and Jim Jensen described a partial skeleton (BYU ESM 163 as of Galton, 2007) missing the head, hands, and tail as Nanosaurus? rex, which had been damaged by other collectors prior to description. By 1977, he had concluded that Nanosaurus agilis was quite different from N. rex and the new skeleton, and coined Othnielia for the latter species. The paper (primarily concerning the transcontinental nature of Dryosaurus) considered Laosaurus consors and L. gracilis synonyms of O. rex without elaboration, and considered L. celer an invalid nomen nudum.

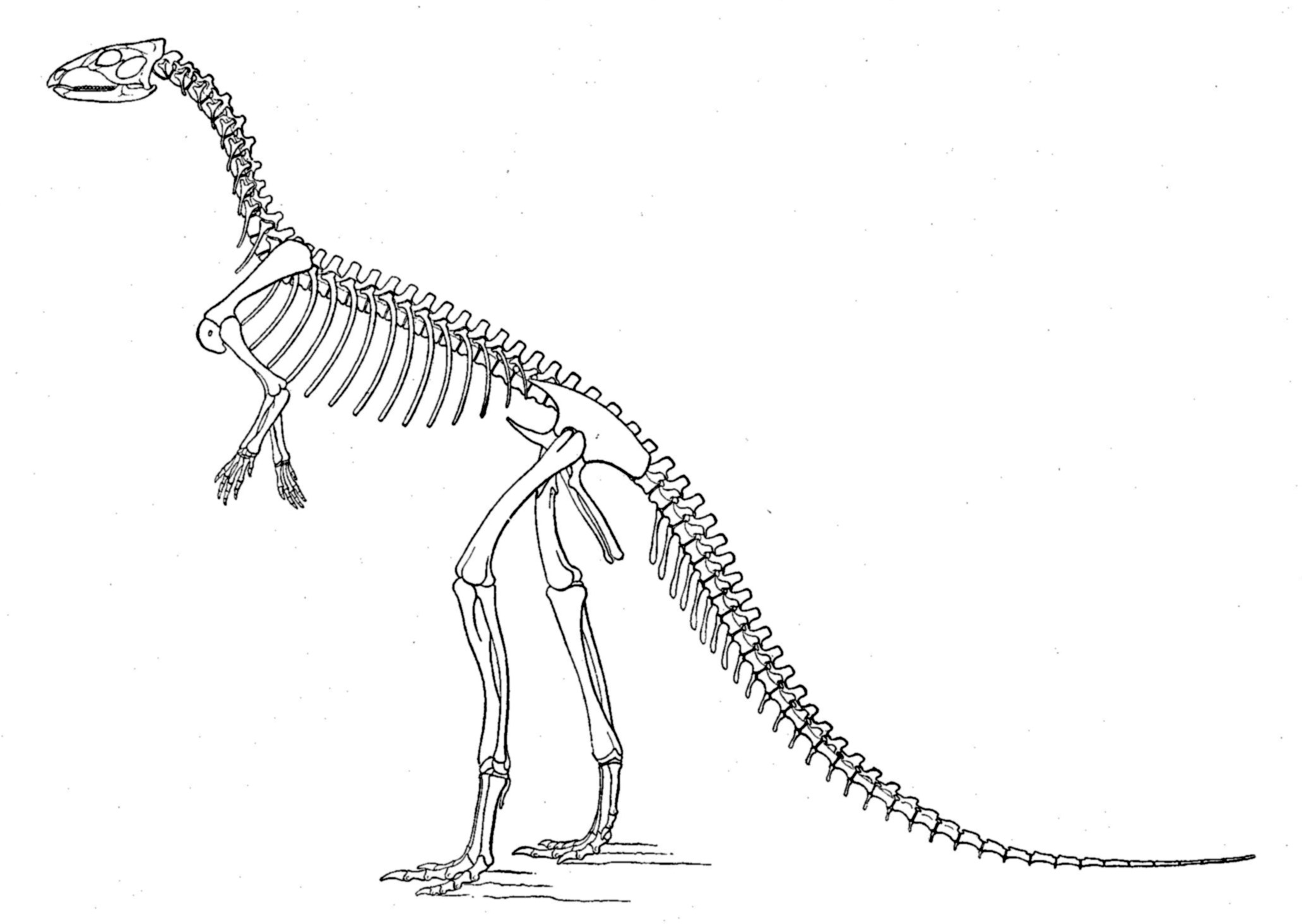
Othniel Charles Marsh's 1896 skeletal restoration of "Laosaurus" consors (now Nanosaurus).

In 1990, Robert Bakker, Peter Galton, James Siegwarth, and James Filla described remains of a dinosaur they named Drinker nisti. The name is somewhat ironic; Drinker, named for renowned palaeontologist Edward Drinker Cope whose infamous "Bone Wars" with rival Othniel Charles Marsh produced many dinosaur fossils which are world-famous today, was described as a probable close relative of Othnielia, named for Marsh. The species name refers to the National Institute of Standards and Technology (NIST). Discovered by Siegwarth and Filla in upper Morrison Formation beds at Como Bluff, Wyoming, it was based on a partial subadult skeleton (listed as CPS 106 originally, then as Tate 4001 by Bakker 1996) including partial jaws, vertebrae, and partial limbs. Several other specimens found in the same area were assigned to it, mostly consisting of vertebral and hindlimb remains, and teeth. The holotype specimen's current location is unknown; according to Carpenter and Galton (2018), the previous two institutions reported to have had it did not ever curate the specimen, and the collection it was originally said to be in never existed at all.

Several decades later, in his 2007 study of the teeth of Morrison ornithischians, Galton concluded that the holotype femur of Othnielia rex is not diagnostic, and reassigned the BYU skeleton to Laosaurus consors, which is based on better material. As the genus Laosaurus is also based on nondiagnostic material, he gave the species L. consors its own genus, Othnielosaurus. As a result, in practical terms, what had been thought of as Othnielia is now known as Othnielosaurus consors. Regarding Nanosaurus agilis, Galton considered it a potentially valid basal ornithopod, and noted similarities to heterodontosaurids in the thigh bone. He tentatively assigned to it some teeth that had been referred to Drinker.

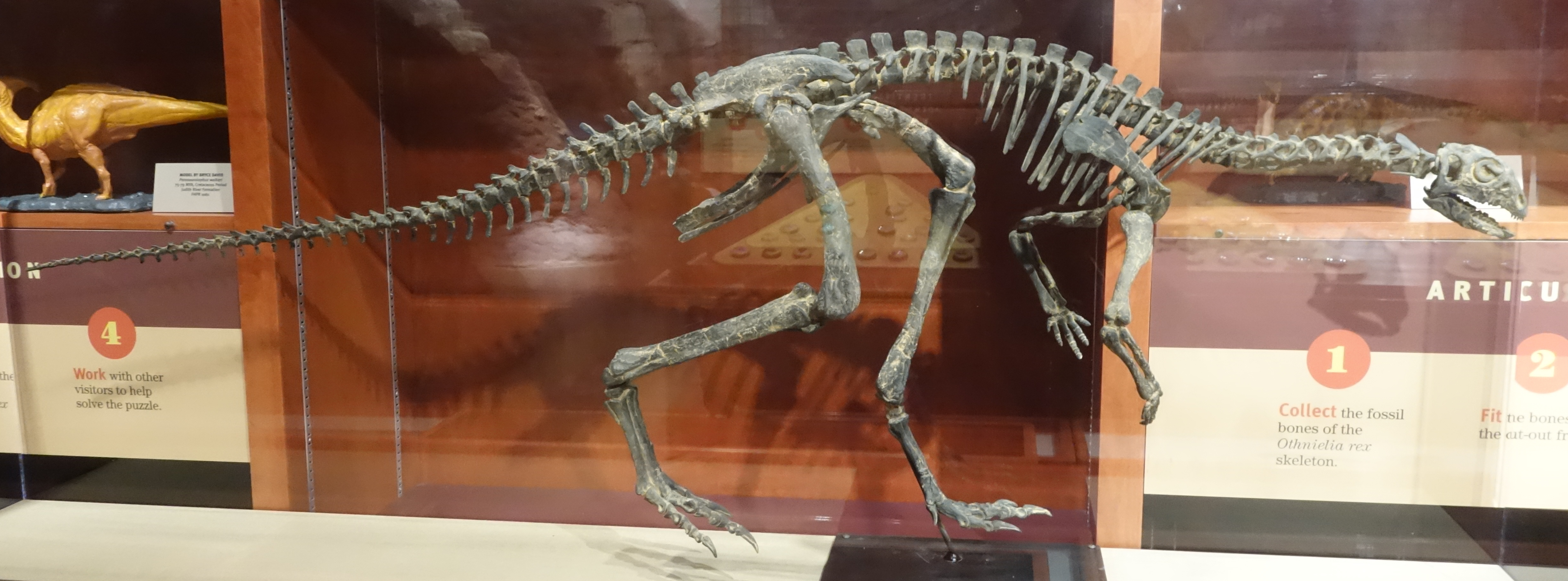
Skeleton with outdated skull-shape based on Hypsilophodon

Another decade later, in 2018, Galton, alongside Kenneth Carpenter, described a new ornithischian specimen. They found it very similar to the fragmentary holotype of Nanosaurus, but more clear in its anatomical features. Their new specimen was also found to display extreme similarity with the specimens of Othnielosaurus and Drinker. Due to the new data, they concluded that all three species, alongside Othnielia, represented the same animal, united under the name Nanosaurus agilis. This painted a new picture of a singular, very common small dinosaur known from a large amount of material. This conclusion has been recognized by papers since, some of which incorporating the new, all-encompassing taxon into their phylogenetic analyses.

=== Later research ===
A 2025 study by Paul Barrett and Susannah Maidment failed to recognize autapomorphies (unique derived traits) or unique combinations of characters in the fragmentary or poorly preserved type specimens of Nanosaurus, Laosaurus, Othnielia, Othnielosaurus, and Drinker. As such, they opted to recognize the genera as nomina dubia that could not be conclusively synonymized with each other. They ultimately concluded that studies of the more complete specimens referred to these taxa may clarify the true relationships and diversity of small Morrison Formation ornithischians.

Barrett and Maidment observed that the teeth denticles (serrations) of Drinker are surprisingly similar to those of pachycephalosaurs such as Dracorex. Furthermore, the jugal bears ornamentation otherwise only seen in pachycephalosaurs. While this identification is highly tentative, it would make Drinker the only known Jurassic pachycephalosaur, and as such, the oldest member of the clade, filling a ghost lineage implied by the existence of Late Jurassic ceratopsians.

In their description of the new genus Enigmacursor, Maidment and Barrett commented further on the anatomy of the type specimens of Nanosaurus, Othnielia, and Othnielosaurus. They noted that the holotypes of Othnielia and Othnielosaurus show differences in the femur from Enigmacursor, and concluded that, although not diagnostic, these specimens at least represent a different taxon from Enigmacursor.

== Description ==
Size compared to a human

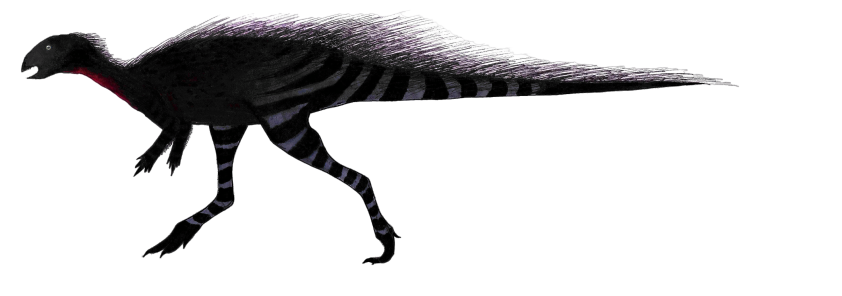
Life restoration

Nanosaurus is known from material from all parts of the body, including two good skeletons, although the skull is still poorly known. It was a small animal, with specimens previously assigned to Drinker and Othnielosaurus measuring 2–2.2 metres (6.6–7.2 ft) long and weighing 20–30 kilograms (44–66 lb).

It was a bipedal dinosaur with short forelimbs and long hindlimbs with large processes for muscle attachments. The hands were short and broad with short fingers. The head was small. It had small leaf-shaped cheek teeth (triangular and with small ridges and denticles lining the front and back edges), and premaxillary teeth with less ornamentation.

Like several other neornithischian dinosaurs, such as Hypsilophodon, Thescelosaurus, and Talenkauen, Nanosaurus had thin plates lying along the ribs. Called intercostal plates, these structures were cartilaginous in origin.

== Classification ==
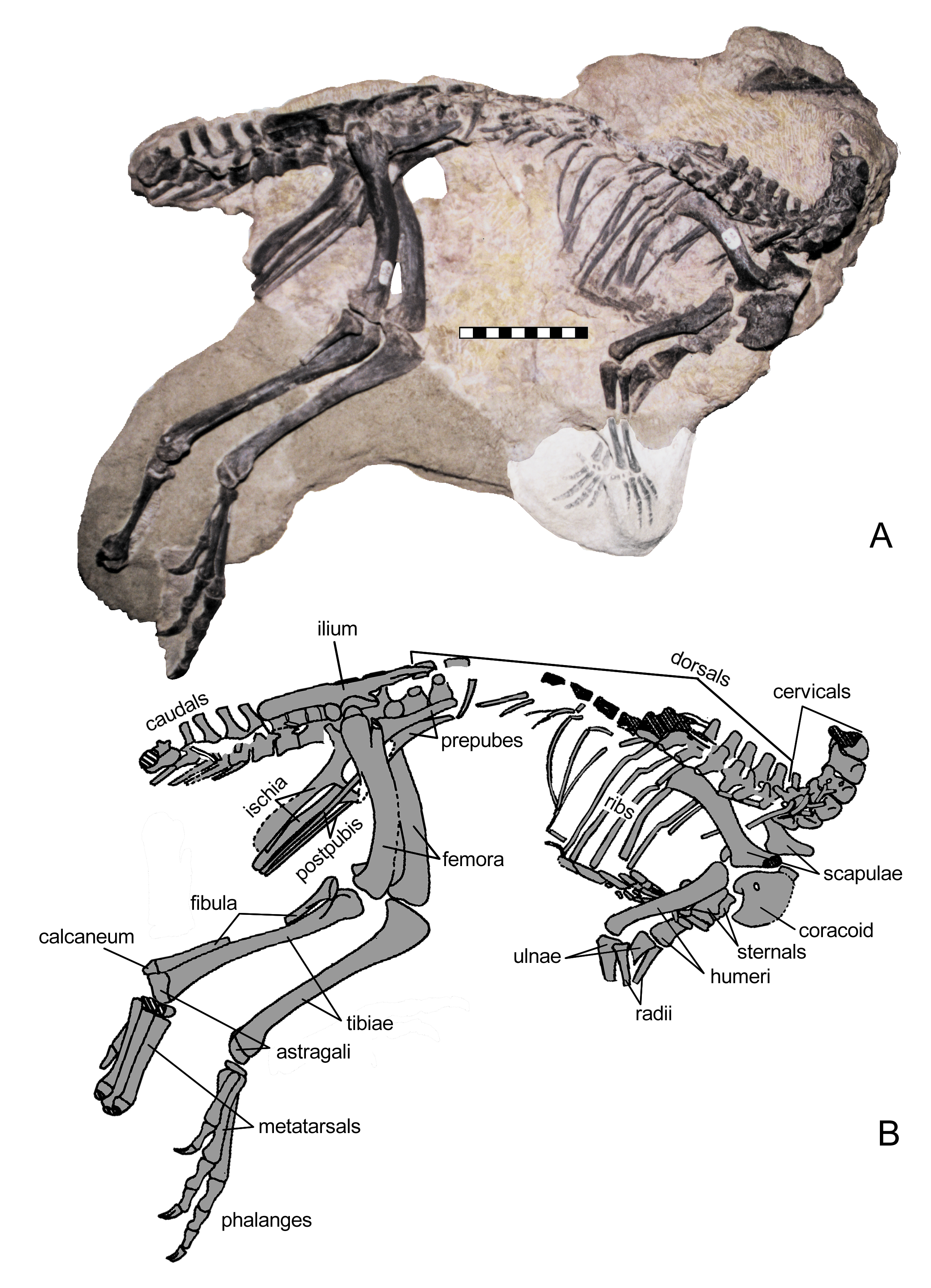
Skull-less skeleton of a juvenile Nanosaurus skeleton (BYU 163)

The cladogram below results from analysis by Herne et al., 2019.

- Ornithischia
  - Heterodontosauridae
  - - Eocursor
    - - Thyreophora
      - Neornithischia
        - Lesothosaurus
        - - Agilisaurus
          - - - Hexinlusaurus
              - Yandusaurus
            - - - Nanosaurus
                - - Jeholosauridae
                    - Haya
                    - - Jeholosaurus
                      - Changchunsaurus
                  - Thescelosauridae
                    - - Orodromeus
                      - Koreanosaurus
                    - - Zephyrosaurus
                      - - Yueosaurus
                        - Thescelosaurus
              - Cerapoda
                - Marginocephalia
                - Ornithopoda

== Paleobiology and paleoecology ==
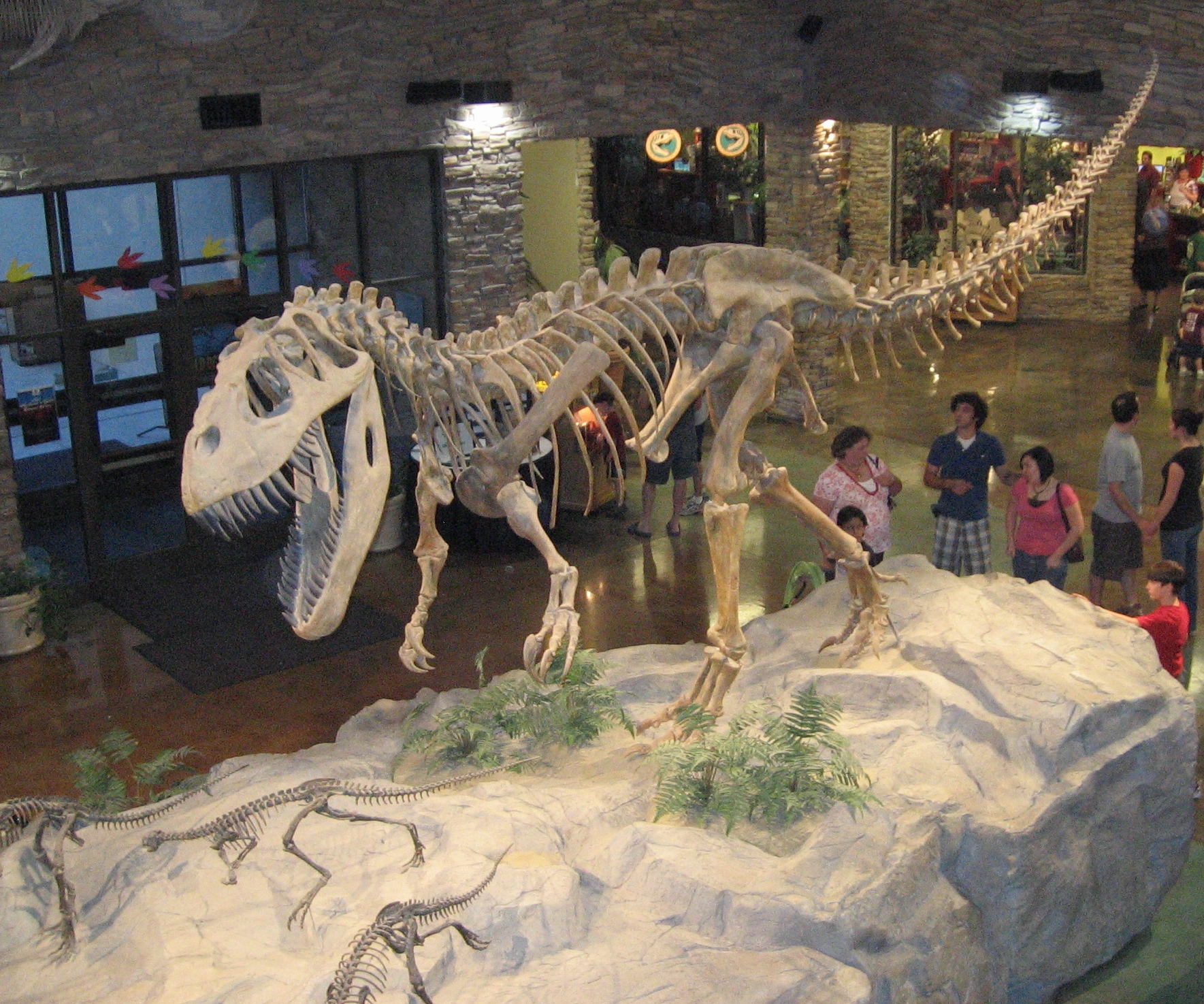
Torvosaurus mounted as if chasing Nanosaurus, Museum of Ancient Life

Nanosaurus was one of the smaller members of the diverse Morrison Formation dinosaur fauna, diminutive in comparison to the giant sauropods. The Morrison Formation is interpreted as a semiarid environment with distinct wet and dry seasons, and flat floodplains. Vegetation varied from river-lining gallery forests of conifers, tree ferns, and ferns, to fern savannas with rare trees. It has been a rich fossil hunting ground, holding fossils of green algae, fungi, mosses, horsetails, ferns, cycads, ginkgoes, and several families of conifers. Other fossils discovered include bivalves, snails, ray-finned fishes, frogs, salamanders, turtles, sphenodonts, lizards, terrestrial and aquatic crocodylomorphs, several species of pterosaur, numerous dinosaur species, and early mammals such as docodonts, multituberculates, symmetrodonts, and triconodonts. Such dinosaurs as the theropods Ceratosaurus, Allosaurus, Ornitholestes, and Torvosaurus, the sauropods Apatosaurus, Brachiosaurus, Camarasaurus, and Diplodocus, and the ornithischians Camptosaurus, Dryosaurus, and Stegosaurus are known from the Morrison. Nanosaurus is present in stratigraphic zones 2-5.

Typically, Nanosaurus has been interpreted like other hypsilophodonts as a small, swift herbivore, although Bakker (1986) interpreted Nanosaurus as an omnivore.
