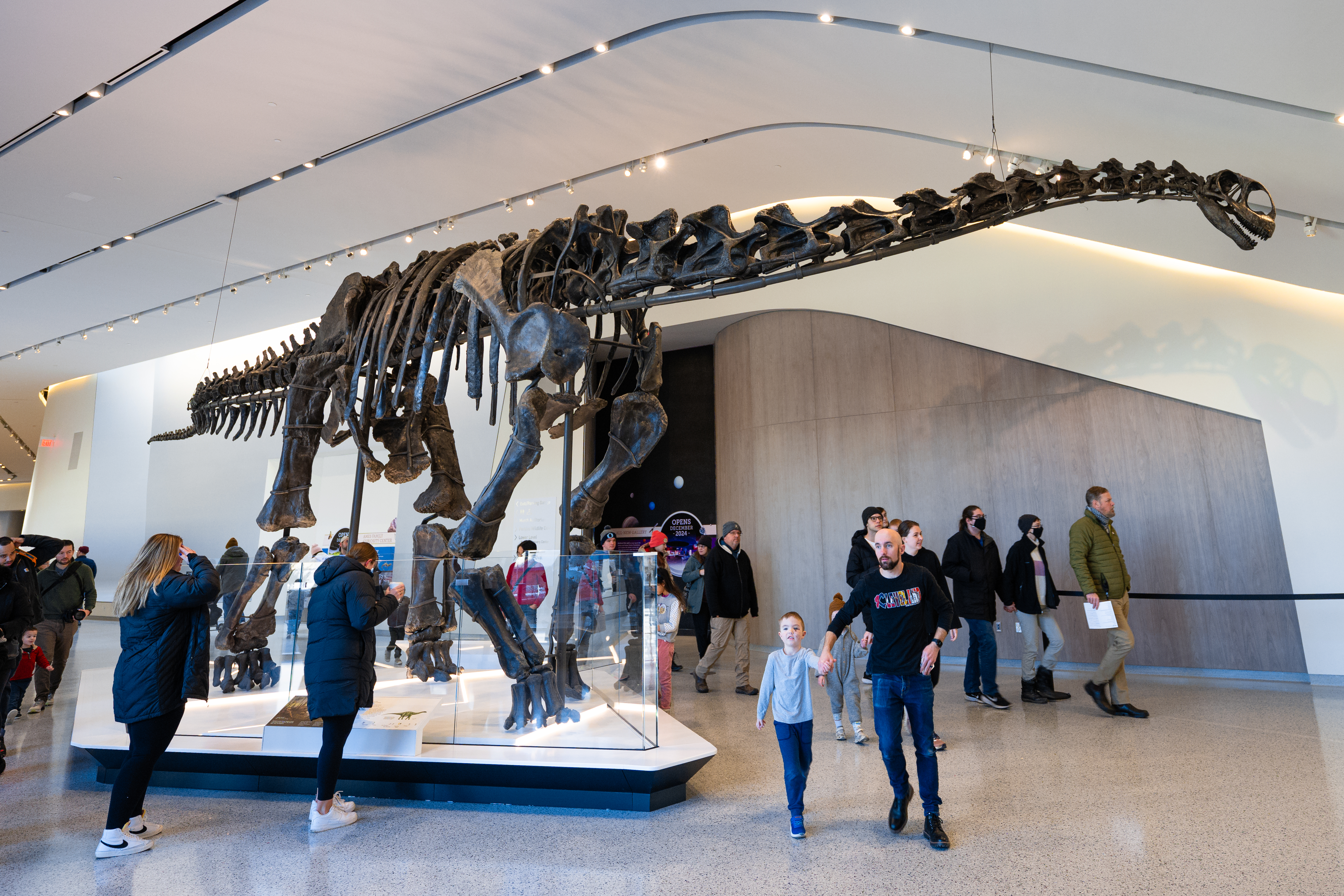
- Mount of H. delfsi in Cleveland Museum of Natural History

Scientific classification
- Kingdom: Animalia
- Phylum: Chordata
- Class: Reptilia
- Clade: Dinosauria
- Clade: Saurischia
- Clade: †Sauropodomorpha
- Clade: †Sauropoda
- Superfamily: †Diplodocoidea
- Family: †Haplocanthosauridae; Bonaparte, 1999
- Genus: †Haplocanthosaurus; Hatcher, 1903 (conserved name)

Type species
- †Haplocanthosaurus priscus (Hatcher, 1903) (conserved name)

Other species
- †H. delfsi McIntosh & Williams, 1988

Synonyms
- Haplocanthus Hatcher, 1903 (preoccupied; nomen rejectum); Haplocanthosaurus utterbacki Hatcher, 1903

= Haplocanthosaurus =

Haplocanthosaurus Temporal range: Late Jurassic, 155–152 Ma

Extinct genus of dinosaurs

Haplocanthosaurus (meaning "simple spined lizard") is a genus of diplodocoid sauropod dinosaur. Two species, H. delfsi and H. priscus, are known from incomplete fossil skeletons. They lived during the Late Jurassic (Kimmeridgian stage), 155 to 152 million years ago in North America. The type species is H. priscus, named in 1903 John Bell Hatcher , and the referred species H. delfsi was discovered by a young college student named Edwin Delfs in Colorado, United States and described by Jack McIntosh and Michael Williams in 1988. Haplocanthosaurus specimens have been found in the lowermost layer of the Morrison Formation, along with Hesperosaurus mjosi, Brontosaurus yahnahpin, and Allosaurus jimmadseni.

== Discovery ==
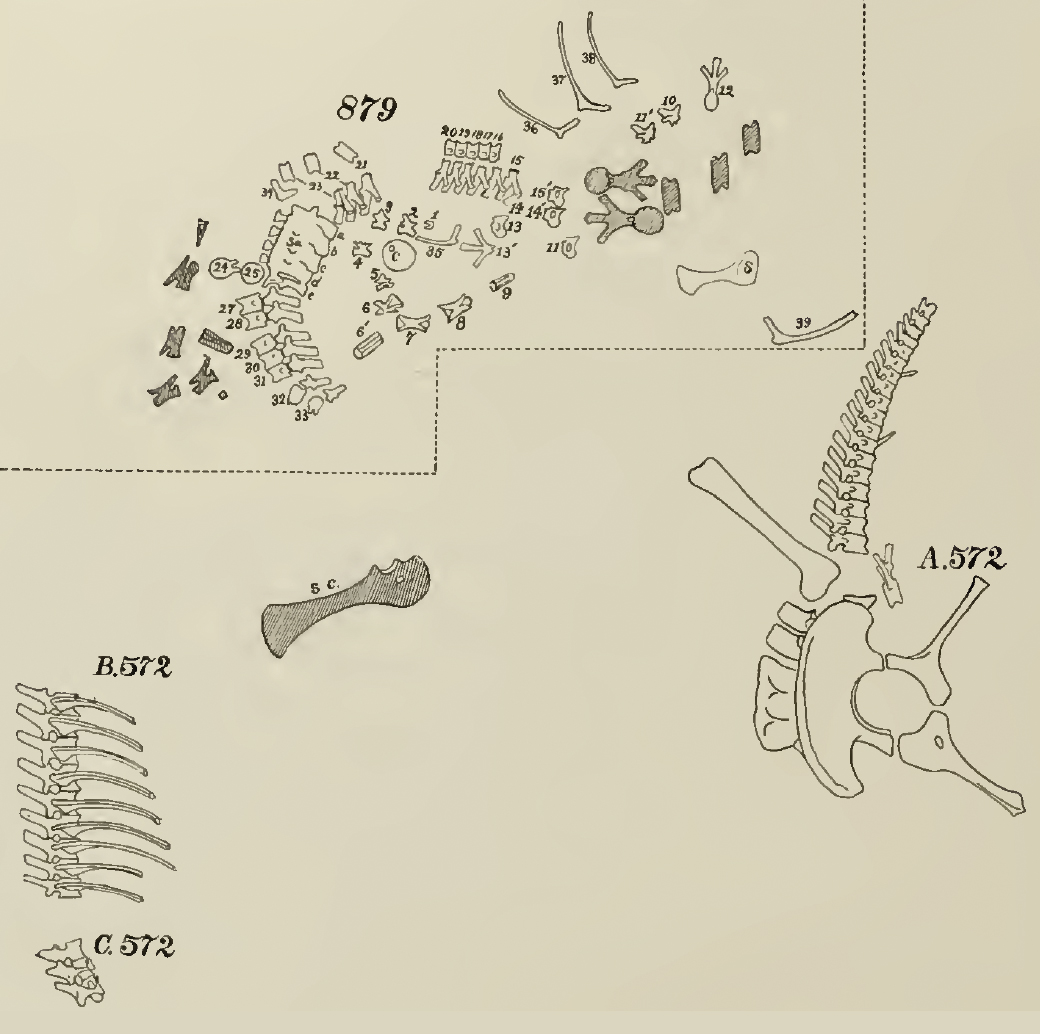
Quarry map showing holotype of H. priscus

There are four known specimens of Haplocanthosaurus: one of H. delfsi, and three of H. priscus. Of these, the type of H. delfsi is the only one complete enough to mount. The mounted specimen of H. delfsi now stands in the Cleveland Museum of Natural History, albeit with a completely speculative replica skull, as the actual skull was not recovered. Present in stratigraphic zones 1, 2, and 4. Recently described specimens from a different region of the Morrison Formation were assigned to Haplocanthosaurus in 2014. The study describing them noted that Haplocanthosaurus is known for certain from at least four specimens, assigned to H. priscus (CM 572), H. utterbacki (=H. priscus; CM 879), H. delfsi (CMNH 10380), and H. sp. (MWC 8028). Up to seven additional specimens have been assigned to Haplocanthosaurus? or Haplocanthosauridae indet. One potential specimen has been nicknamed "Big Monty," for its discovery in Montana. It has been claimed to measure an incredible 34 meters (110 ft) long. However, much controversy surrounds the specimen and, as such, little is truly known about it.

== Description ==
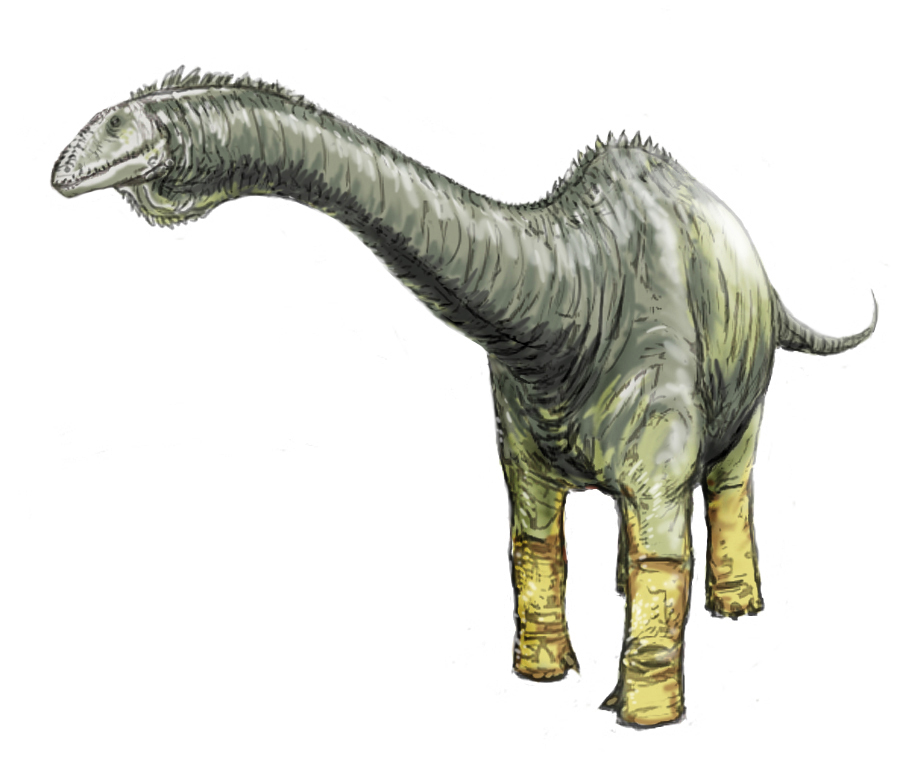
Life restoration

Haplocanthosaurus was one of the smallest sauropods of the Morrison. While some Morrison sauropods could reach lengths of over 20 meters (or over 66 feet), Haplocanthosaurus was smaller, reaching a total length of 14.8 meters (49 feet) and an estimated weight of 12.8 metric tons (14.1 short tons).

Haplocanthosaurus is known from many elements, mostly of vertebra. In the middle and cervical caudals of Apatosaurus, Camarasaurus, Cetiosaurus and Haplocanthosaurus, the intraprezygapophyseal lamina is separate from the root of the neural canal by a vertical midline lamina. In the last few caudals and the most cranial dorsals, the lateral edge of the prezygapophyseal lamina becomes widened and roughened. Hatcher (1901) interpreted this as forming the attachment area for the muscles from which the scapular blade was suspended.

The dorsoventrally elongate oval outlines are characteristic of Haplocanthosaurus with only Camarasaurus also possessing them. The parapophyses remaining as oval facets on the craniolateral margin, and the sacral spines 1-3 fused are also found in both Haplocanthosaurus and Camarasaurus.

The Cetiosaurus specimen OUMNH J13695 has a low horizontal ridge on each of its lateral surfaces, creating a slightly subhexagonal transverse cross-section, a feature also seen on Cetiosauriscus, the anterior caudals of Haplocanthosaurus, and caudals 15-30 of Omeisaurus. Also, the area around the periphery of each articular face is flattened, creating a ‘bevelled’ appearance, and also occurs in Haplocanthosaurus and Cetiosauriscus.

=== Distinguishing characteristics ===
Haplocanthosaurus is distinguished by dorsal vertebra lacking cranial centrodiapophyseal laminae. Also, it is distinguished by elongate intrapostzygapophyseal laminae, dorsoventrally directed dorsal transverse processes that approach the height of the neural spines, and the distal end of the scapular blade being dorsally and ventrally expanded.

== Classification ==
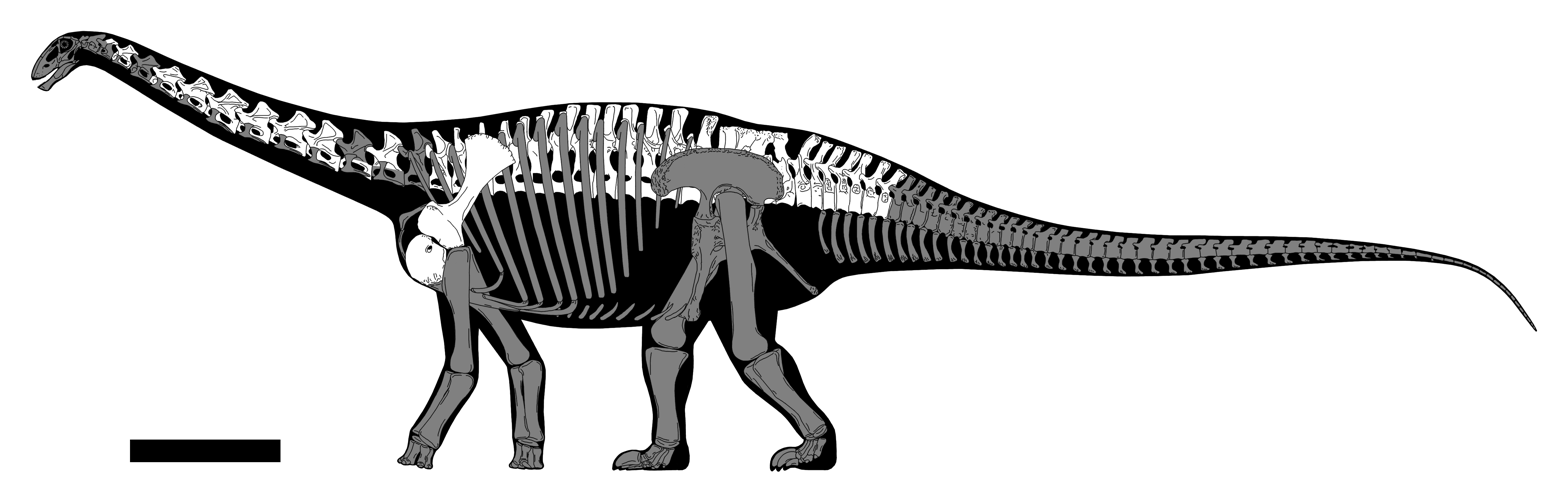
Diagram showing known remains of specimen CM 879

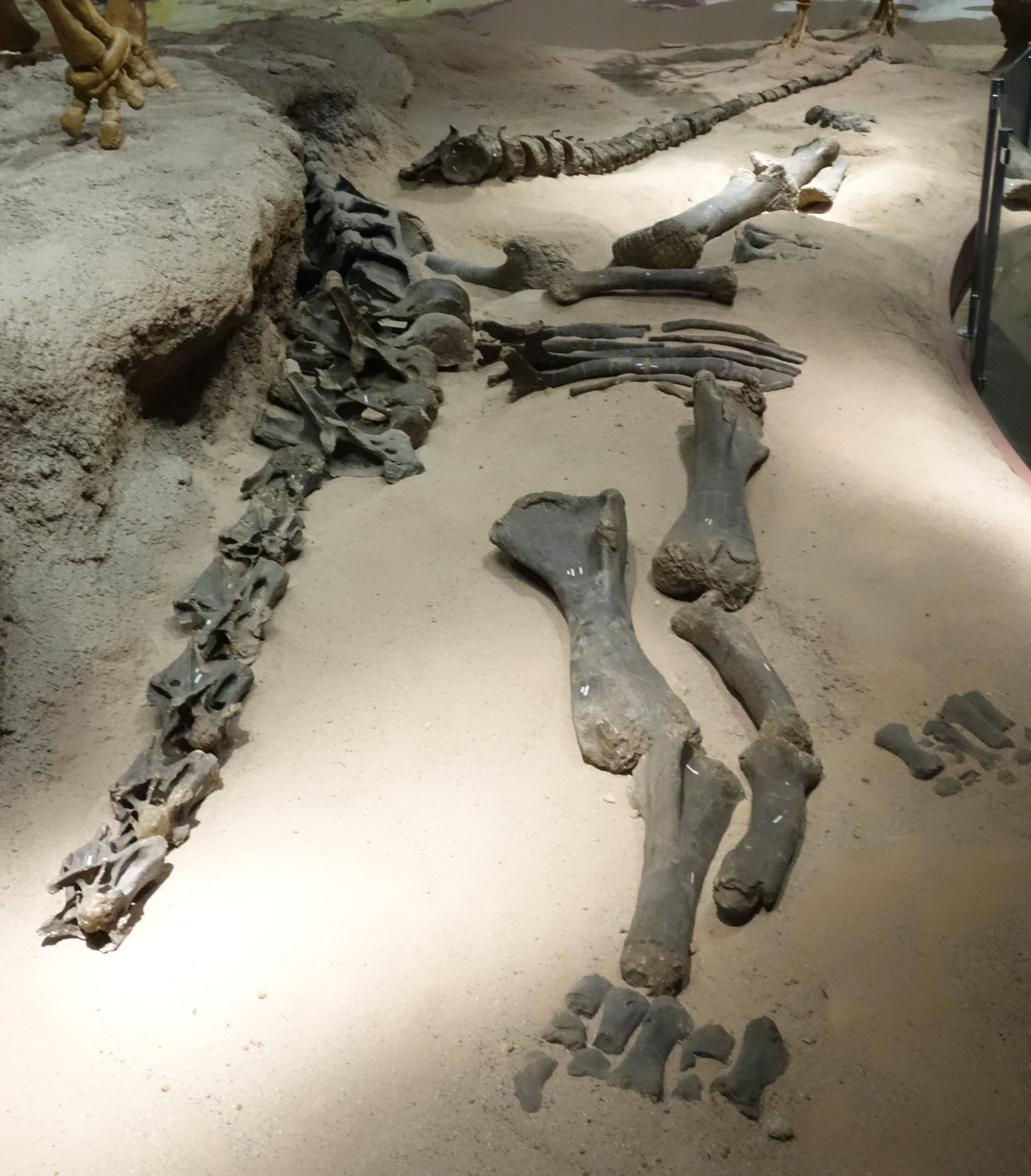
Specimen FHPR 1106

Haplocanthosaurus priscus was originally named Haplocanthus priscus by John Bell Hatcher in 1903. Soon after his original description, Hatcher came to believe the name Haplocanthus had already been used for a genus of acanthodian fish (Haplacanthus, named by Louis Agassiz in 1845), and was thus preoccupied. Hatcher re-classified his sauropod later in 1903, giving it the new name Haplocanthosaurus. However, the name was not technically preoccupied at all, since there was a variation in spelling: the fish was named Haplacanthus, not Haplocanthus. While Haplocanthus technically remained the valid name for this dinosaur, Hatcher's mistake was not noticed until many years after the name Haplocanthosaurus had become fixed in scientific literature. When the mistake was finally discovered, a petition to conserve Haplocanthosaurus as the official generic name and reject Haplocanthus was submitted to the ICZN (the body which governs scientific names in zoology) in 1989, which was approved in 1991.

Originally described as a "cetiosaurid", José Bonaparte decided in 1999 that Haplocanthosaurus differed enough from other sauropods to warrant its own family, the Haplocanthosauridae.

Phylogenetic studies have failed to clarify the exact relationships of Haplocanthosaurus with any certainty. Studies have variously found it to be more primitive than the neosauropods, a primitive macronarian (related to the ancestor of more advanced forms such as Camarasaurus and the brachiosaurids), or a very primitive diplodocoid, more closely related to Diplodocus than to titanosaurs, but more primitive than rebbachisaurids.

In 2005, Darren Naish and Mike Taylor reviewed the various proposed positions of Haplocanthosaurus in their study of diplodocoid phylogeny. They found it could be a non-neosauropod eusauropod, a basal macronarian, or a basal diplodocoid. In 2011, an analysis by Whitlock recovered Haplocanthosaurus as the basalmost member of the Diplodocoidea, the third potentiality of Taylor & Naish. In 2015, a specimen-level phylogenetic analysis was published, finding Haplocanthosaurus to be a confirmed diplodocoid, either very basal, or more derived than rebbachisaurids. Their implied weighting cladogram is shown below.

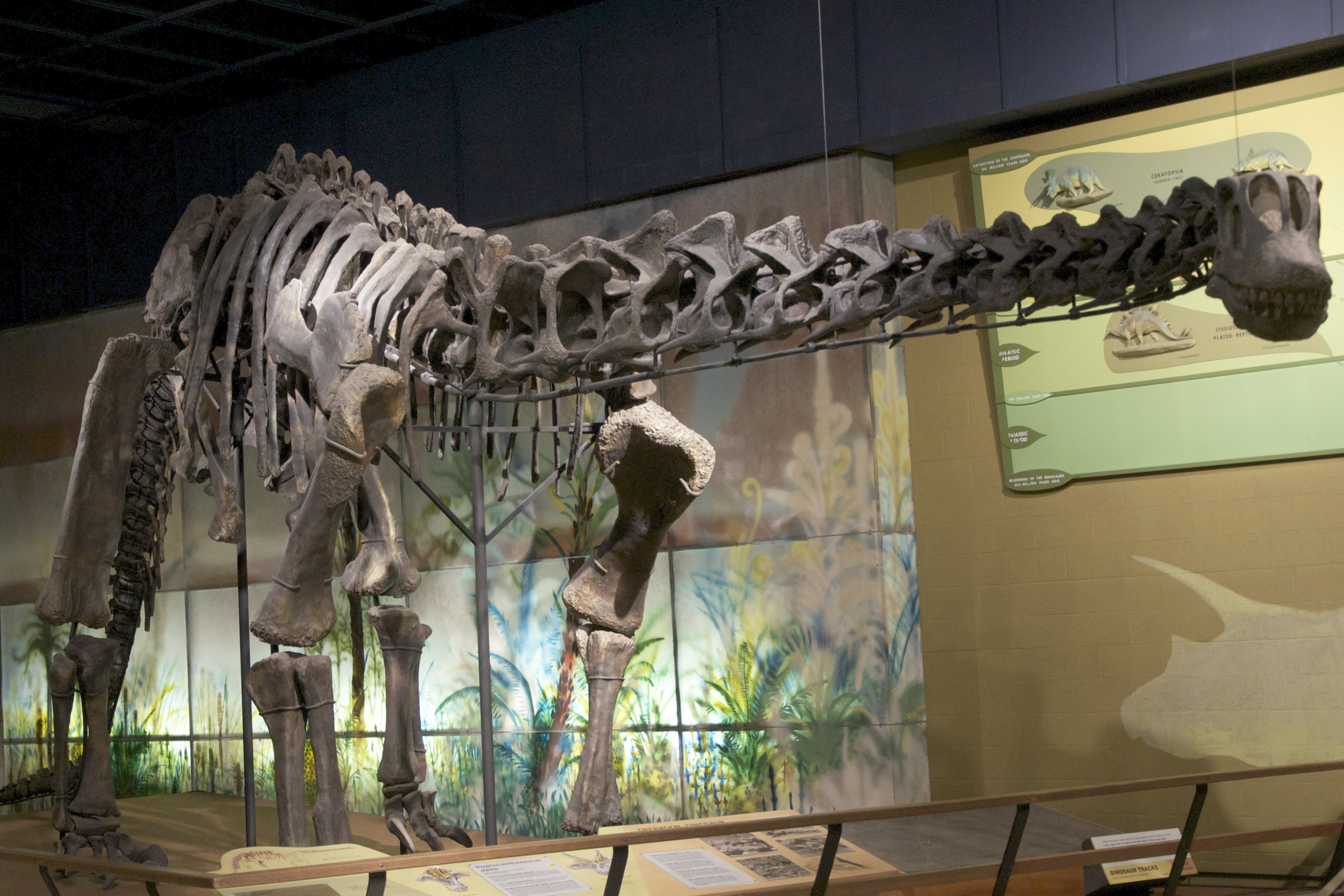
Outdated H. delfsi skeleton mount, Cleveland Museum of Natural History

- Diplodocoidea
  - Haplocanthosaurus priscus
  - Diplodocimorpha
    - Rebbachisauridae
      - Zapalasaurus
      - - Limaysaurinae
          - Limaysaurus
          - Cathartesaura
        - Nigersaurinae
          - Nigersaurus
          - Demandasaurus
    - Flagellicaudata
