= Earth Shaker (disambiguation) =

Earth Shaker is a cult title for Poseidon, an ancient Greek god.

Earth Shaker, Earth-Shaker or Earthshaker may refer also to:

- Pachacuti, a ruler of the Inca Empire who took the title "Pachacuti", meaning Earth Shaker
- Kengue, an important figure in Kongolese mythology known sometimes as the Earth Shaker
- Seismosaurus, an antiquated name for a species of sauropod meaning "earth-shaker lizard"
- The Earth-Shaker, a science fiction novel
- Earth Shaker (video game), a computer game
- Earthshaker! (pinball), a pinball game

== See also ==
- Earthquake (disambiguation)
