= Quaker Hill =

Quaker Hill, Quaker Hills, Quakers Hill, Quakers Hills, may refer to:

== Places ==
- Quakers Hill, New South Wales, Australia; a suburb of Sydney
  - Quakers Hill High School
  - Quakers Hill railway station
- Quaker Hill, California, USA;
- Quaker Hill, Connecticut, USA; a village, a neighborhood in the town of Waterford
  - Quaker Hill Historic District (Waterford, Connecticut), USA; listed on the NRHP in Connecticut
- Quaker Hill, Hockessin, Delaware, USA; in New Castle County
  - Quaker Hill Historic District (Wilmington, Delaware), USA; listed on the NRHP in Delaware
- Quaker Hill, New York State, USA; a community, a hamlet in the Town of Pawling in Dutchess County
- Quaker Hill, Prospect Park (Brooklyn), New York City, New York State, USA; a hill
  - Quaker Hill Cemetery, Quaker Hill, Prospect Park (Brooklyn), New York City, New York State, USA
- Quaker Hills, Pinebrook, New Rochelle, New York State, USA; see List of neighborhoods in New Rochelle, New York
- Quaker Hills, Lancaster County, Pennsylvania, USA; see List of places in Pennsylvania: Pl–Q

== Other uses ==
- Battle of Quaker Hill (1778), American War of Independence; also known as the Battle of Rhode Island
- Quakers Hill Press, Australian publisher

== See also ==
- Quakers (disambiguation)
- Quaker (disambiguation)
- Hills (disambiguation)
- Hill (disambiguation)
