= Quakers Hill Press =

Small press Australian publishing company

Quakers Hill Press is a small press Australian publishing company created by Peter Day, a former US correspondent for The Australian, in 1990.

Authors published include Geoffrey Partington, David Stove, James Franklin, Roger Sworder, Patrick Morgan and R. J. Stove.

Especially noteworthy are the events surrounding the June 1996 publication of the QHP book Hasluck Versus Coombs: White Politics and Australia's Aborigines, by Flinders University scholar Geoffrey Partington. The book was launched in the Great Hall of Parliament House in Canberra by John Herron, the then Federal Minister for Aboriginal and Torres Strait Islander Affairs. This generated front-page publicity (see The Australian's issue of 17 June 1996) and much controversy. It signalled a renewed interest by the recently elected Howard Government in the then-unpopular assimilationist policies associated with Paul Hasluck, in contrast to the separatist policies of H.C. ('Nugget') Coombs. This was one of the first steps in the reversal of indigenous policy that eventually led to the 'Intervention' of 2007. While the policies advocated by Partington are now more or less commonplace in Australian indigenous policy circles, in 1996 they produced outrage. This included a petition signed by 66 Australian academics, led by Dr Suvendrini Perera of La Trobe University, demanding that the Australian media cease publicising the book. Two printings quickly sold out. The book is still out of print, but may now be downloaded in digital form from the website of the Bennelong Society, including a new Preface by Gary Johns, Special Minister of State and Assistant Minister for Industrial Relations in the Keating Labor Government of 1993–1996.

Another notable QHP publication was Cricket versus Republicanism by Sydney philosopher David Stove. While Stove had for many years enjoyed a strong international reputation among philosophers, this provocative little book helped take his work to a wider audience, both internationally and in Australia. Recent well-received republications of Stove's work in the US include Against the Idols of the Age (ed Roger Kimball, Transaction Publishers); and Darwinian Fairytales: Selfish Genes, Errors of Heredity and Other Fables of Evolution, published by Encounter Books. Both these volumes include essays that appeared in QHP's Cricket versus Republicanism.

== Publications ==
Publications include:

- Geoffrey Partington, Hasluck Versus Coombs: White politics and Australia’s Aborigines ISBN 0-646-27245-4
- James Franklin and Albert Daoud, Proof in Mathematics: An introduction ISBN 1-876192-00-3
- David Stove, Cricket Versus Republicanism and Other Essays, ISBN 0-646-21328-8
- Peter Shrubb, The Weston Men's Tennis Club ISBN 0-646-14488-X
- R.J. Stove, Prince of Music: Palestrina and his world ISBN 0-7316-8792-2
- Patrick Morgan: 'Folie a deux': William and Caroline Dexter in colonial Australia ISBN 1-876192-05-4
- Roger Sworder: Mining, metallurgy and the meaning of life: the hidden roots of the great debate over mining and the environment ISBN 0-646-22836-6
