= David Gillette =

American paleontologist (1946–2025)

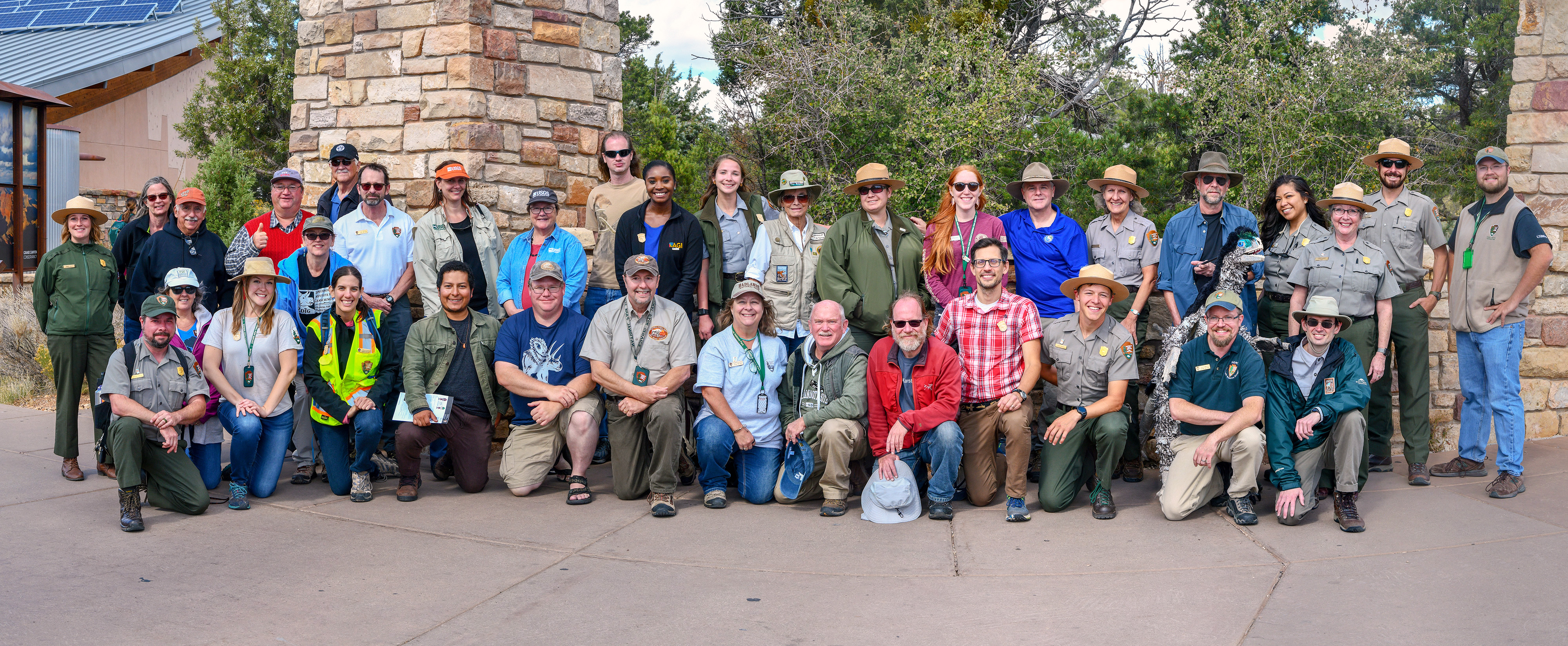
David Gillette (third from the left on the back row, wearing an orange cap) and other paleontologists at Grand Canyon National Park, 2019

David D. Gillette (March 20, 1946 – February 10, 2025) was an American paleontologist best known for his discovery of the dinosaur Diplodocus hallorum in 1985, and more recently for his work studying Pleistocene megafauna such as glyptodonts. At the time of its discovery, Diplodocus hallorum was the longest dinosaur known.

== Discoveries ==
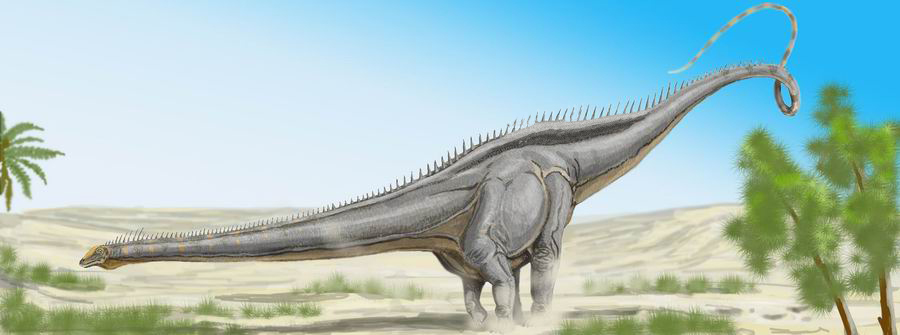
Restoration of Diplodocus hallorum (formerly Seismosaurus)

Gillette found eight huge bones of the Diplodocus in northwestern New Mexico in May 1985. Gillette began comparing the dinosaur bones he found to those of other dinosaurs. Gillette presented his conclusions in a press conference at the New Mexico Museum of Natural History and Science and in the Journal of Vertebrate Paleontology. He gave the new dinosaur the name Seismosaurus halli, or "earth shaker." In 1993, Gillette published his book, Seismosaurus: The Earth Shaker, about his discovery. It was published by Columbia University Press and illustrated by Mark Hallett. The book was re-printed in paperback in 1999.

Seismosaurus was later re-categorized as a new species of Diplodocus, and renamed Diplodocus hallorum: while the specimen Gillette described was indeed of a novel species, it belonged to the existing Diplodocus genus rather than a previously undiscovered group.

== Death ==
Gillette died on February 10, 2025, at the age of 78.
