= Quake =

Quake may refer to:

== Seismology ==
- Earthquake, a shaking of the Earth's surface
- Quake (natural phenomenon), surface shaking on any astronomical body

== Arts and entertainment ==
- Quake (album), a 2003 album by Erik Friedlander
- Quake (1992 film), an American direct-to-video film
- Quake (2021 film), an Icelandic drama film
- The Quake (film), a 2018 Norwegian film
- Quake (series), a series of first-person shooter games
  - Quake (video game), the 1996 first game in the series
    - Quake engine, a game engine by ID Software, first used in the 1996 game
    - Quake (original soundtrack), by Trent Reznor and Nine Inch Nails, 1996
  - Quake II engine, the 1997 second iteration of the game engine, first used in Quake II
- WQKE, The Quake, an FM radio station in Plattsburgh, New York, US
- Quake, a Transformers comics character
- Quake, a superhero code name used by the Marvel Comics character Daisy Johnson
- Quake: Youth Encountering the Gospel, a Christian youth event hosted across the United States

== Other uses ==
- Quake (cereal), a breakfast cereal marketed with Quisp
- Quake Inc., now Exit Tunes, Inc., a Japanese media company
- Quake Lake, a lake in Montana, US
- Stephen Quake (born 1969), American scientist

== See also ==
- Earthquake (disambiguation)
- Quaker (disambiguation)
