= Quaker (disambiguation) =

A Quaker is a term used to describe members of the Religious Society of Friends, a historically Christian denomination.

Quaker may also refer to:

== Animals and plants ==
- Quaker butterfly (Neopithecops zalmora)
- Quaker lady (disambiguation), name given to several flowers
- Quaker parrot, also known as the monk parakeet (Myiopsitta monachus)
- Quaker, one of several names for Dissosteira carolina, also known as the Carolina grasshopper

== Locations ==
- Quaker, Indiana (or Quaker Point), an unincorporated community in Vermillion County, Indiana
- Quaker, Missouri, an unincorporated community
- Pennsylvania, sometimes called "The Quaker State"
- Quakers Hill, New South Wales, a suburb in Sydney, Australia
- Quaker Island, or Inchcleraun, island in the River Shannon, Ireland

== Organizations and enterprises ==
- Quaker State, a former motor oil manufacturer
- Quaker Oats Company, a U.S. food company

=== Sports ===
- Quakers, the nickname of Darlington F.C. in the north of England and many other businesses in Darlington
- Quakers, the nickname for the athletic teams of Earlham College
- Quakers, the nickname for the athletic teams of Guilford College
- Quakers, the nickname for the athletic teams of Orchard Park, New York
- Quakers, the nickname for the athletic teams of Salem, Ohio
- Penn Quakers, the athletic teams of the University of Pennsylvania
- Philadelphia Quakers, a defunct National Hockey League team

== People ==
- Bernard Barton (1784-1849), sometimes referred to as "The Quaker Poet"
- John Greenleaf Whittier (1807-1892), nicknamed "The Quaker Poet"

== Other uses ==
- Quakers (band), a hip-hop supergroup
- Quaker (coffee), a term used in coffee roasting to denote an unripe or poorly roasted coffee bean, the number of which is often used to judge the quality of a batch of coffee
- Cuáker, an Ecuadorian beverage made from oats (a loanword of "quaker")
- Quackers, a puppet who appeared with Ray Alan
- "Quaker", a song by the American band Bright from the album The Albatross Guest House

== See also ==
- Quake (disambiguation)
