= Mother's Day Quarry =

Fossil site

- MDQ
- Interactive map of Mother's Day Quarry
- 45.2234°N 108.8279°W
- Type: Fossil site
- Periods: Late Jurassic (Kimmeridgian)
- Location: Carbon County, Montana
- Part of: Morrison Formation

Site notes
- Discovered: 1994

The Mother's Day Quarry (MDQ) is a Late Jurassic (Kimmeridgian) fossil site in the Morrison Formation that is located at the base of the Pryor Mountains in Carbon County, Montana. The site was first discovered by the Museum of the Rockies in 1994 and has produced over 2,500 elements since its discovery. Apart from approximately 12 theropod teeth, stegosaur limb material, and two conchostracans found at the site, these elements almost exclusively belong to specimens of the sauropod dinosaur Diplodocus sp. This deposit of fossils is thought to be the result of an age-segregated herd of these dinosaurs congregating at a limited water source and eventually succumbing to drought conditions.

Some debate has arisen regarding the age of the individuals found at the site. Originally the diplodocid specimens from the MDQ were thought to consist solely of juveniles and sub-adults based on the small size of the fossils and the low levels of ossification encountered in these elements. More recently, however, histological sampling of the bones indicates that there may be two populations at this locality: 'normal' young diplodocids with immature bone tissues, and a second population that is likewise small, but exhibits mature bone tissues - potentially indicating that some of these individuals may be dwarfs, or indicative of a regionally, small statured diplodocid population.

The site was initially discovered by volunteers from the Museum of the Rockies on Mother's Day in 1994. Teams from that museum excavated the site for two field seasons, collecting approximately 500 elements. Approximately 2,000 more elements were collected from 2000 to 2012 by crews from the Cincinnati Museum Center. Since 2017, crews from Elevation Science Institute (formerly Bighorn Basin Paleontological Institute) have been excavating the site with the remains being prepared and reposited at the Cincinnati Museum Center, Museum of Natural History and Science.
