= Elevation Science Institute =

American paleontological organization

- Established: 2017
- Type: Non-profit
- Executive director: Jason Schein
- Website: elevationscience.org

The Elevation Science Institute, formerly known as the Bighorn Basin Paleontological Institute, is a non-profit 501(c)(3) organization dedicated to paleontology and earth science research, education, and outreach. The organization conducts paleontological field work in the Bighorn Basin of Montana and Wyoming, largely focusing on vertebrates from the Mesozoic. Elevation Science is the official scientific and educational partner of Field Station: Dinosaurs. Elevation Science prepares fossils and repositories at the Cincinnati Museum Center, Museum of Natural History and Science.

== Programs ==
Elevation Science runs a seven-week field expedition each summer in southern Montana to collect fossils of dinosaurs, other Mesozoic vertebrates, plants, and invertebrates. Field programs generally run from late June through mid-August. These field expeditions are open to sign-ups for individuals of all ages to learn about the geology, paleontology, and natural history of the region while aiding Elevation Science paleontologists in collecting fossils for research. For students, the program is available as a for-credit field paleontology course through Montana State University, Billings.

From 2017 to 2019, Elevation Science also offered a dinosaur-themed summer camp program entitled Dinosaur Treasures in Our Backyard for children throughout rural Carbon County, Montana and in Cody, Wyoming. The program features several lessons and hands-on activities to teach children about dinosaurs, paleontology, and the fossil discoveries that have been made within their region.

== Dig sites ==
Elevation Science dig sites are largely within the Morrison Formation, though they have also spanned through the Lance, Cloverly, Fort Union, and Willwood Formations. Nearly all Elevation Science localities lie within Carbon County, MT. Among Elevation Science excavation sites is the Mother's Day Quarry which the team has been excavating since the summer of 2017.

Elevation Science has excavated a wide variety of dinosaur genera including Diplodocus, Tyrannosaurus, Allosaurus, Triceratops, Leptoceratops, Suuwassea, Edmontosaurus, Ankylosaur, and many others. Their finds have included many crocodilian, turtle, and plant fossils as well.

== Staff ==
Jason Schein, Devon Francis, Jason Poole, Rick Schmidt, Katie Hunt, Skye Walker, Daniel Dunfee
