= Earth Shaker (video game) =

1990 video game

- Developer: Michael Batty
- Publisher: Your Sinclair
- Designer: Michael Batty
- Platform: ZX Spectrum 48k
- Release: 1990
- Genre: Puzzle
- Mode: Single-player

Earth Shaker is a Boulder Dash-inspired game published as a cover tape in 1990 in Your Sinclair (for the ZX Spectrum 48k). Notable in being the first covertape to subjectively set a high standard, having been initially rejected by publishers Zeppelin because of First Star's suing of companies publishing Boulder Dash clones.

== Development ==
The game was originally conceived as a Boulder Dash clone by Michael Batty, but its scope grew through a long development process:

I started Earth Shaker about 4 years before it appeared in Your Sinclair. A Boulder Dash clone seemed like a reasonably easy thing to program. I thought Boulder Dash was great and played it for ages. I'm still fascinated by the way you can get such complicated behaviour and realistic avalanches by using a few simple rules. Earth Shaker just grew—I kept leaving it and going back to it. But it was the first machine code game I managed to actually finish.
