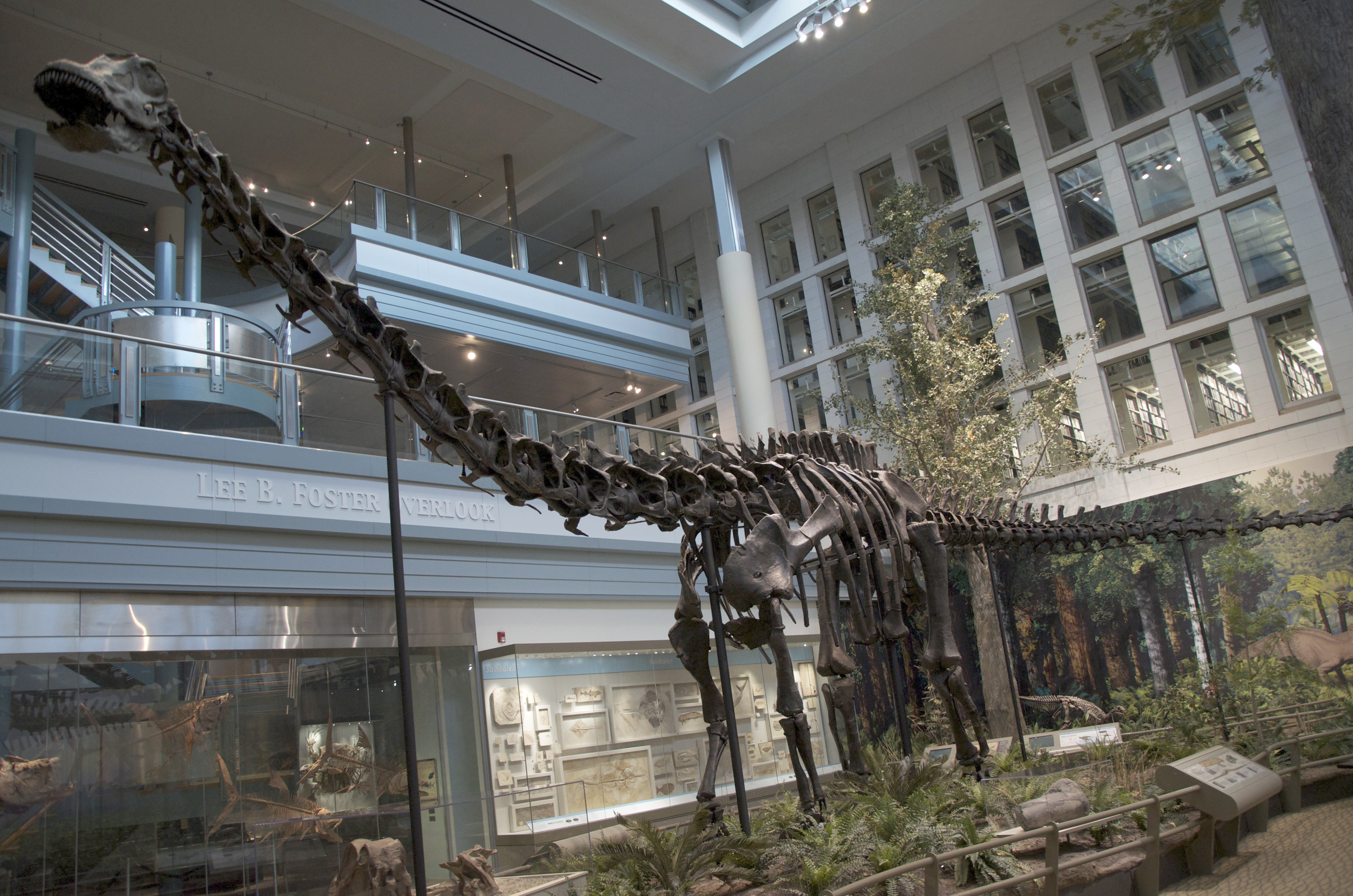
- Mounted D. carnegii (or "Dippy") skeleton at the Carnegie Museum of Natural History; considered the most famous single dinosaur skeleton in the world.

Scientific classification
- Kingdom: Animalia
- Phylum: Chordata
- Class: Reptilia
- Clade: Dinosauria
- Clade: Saurischia
- Clade: †Sauropodomorpha
- Clade: †Sauropoda
- Clade: †Eusauropoda
- Superfamily: †Diplodocoidea
- Family: †Diplodocidae
- Subfamily: †Diplodocinae
- Genus: †Diplodocus; Marsh, 1878

Type species
- †Diplodocus longus (nomen dubium) Marsh, 1878

Other species
- †D. carnegii Hatcher, 1901; †D. hallorum (Gillette, 1991) (originally Seismosaurus)

Synonyms
- Seismosaurus Gillette, 1991

= Diplodocus =

Diplodocus Temporal range: Late Jurassic (Kimmeridgian), 152.07–149.1 Ma

Genus of diplodocid sauropod dinosaurs (fossil)

Diplodocus (/dɪˈplɒdəkəs/, /daɪˈplɒdəkəs/, or /ˌdɪploʊˈdoʊkəs/) is an extinct genus of diplodocid sauropod dinosaurs known from the Late Jurassic of North America and Europe. The first fossils of Diplodocus were discovered in 1877 by S. W. Williston. The generic name, coined by Othniel Charles Marsh in 1878, is a Neo-Latin term derived from Greek διπλός (diplos) "double" and δοκός (dokos) "beam", in reference to the double-beamed chevron bones located in the underside of the tail, which were then considered unique.

The genus lived in what is now mid-western North America, at the end of the Jurassic period. It is one of the more common dinosaur fossils found in the middle to upper Morrison Formation, with most specimens being found in rocks dated between about 151.88 and 149.1 million years ago, during the latest Kimmeridgian Age, although it may have made it into the Tithonian, with at least one specimen (AMNH FR 223) being potentially from among the youngest deposits of the formation. The Morrison Formation records an environment and time dominated by gigantic sauropod dinosaurs, such as Apatosaurus, Barosaurus, Brachiosaurus, Brontosaurus, and Camarasaurus. Its great size may have been a deterrent to the predators Allosaurus and Ceratosaurus: their remains have been found in the same strata, which suggests that they coexisted with Diplodocus.

== Description ==
Skeletal reconstruction of D. carnegii specimens CM 84 and CM 94, with missing portions reconstructed after other diplodocids

Sizes of Diplodocus carnegii (orange) and D. hallorum (green) compared with a human (blue)

Among the best-known sauropods, Diplodocus were very large, long-necked, quadrupedal animals, with long, whip-like tails. Their forelimbs were slightly shorter than their hind limbs, resulting in a largely horizontal posture. The skeletal structures of these long-necked, long-tailed animals supported by four sturdy legs have been compared with cantilever bridges. D. carnegii is one of the longest dinosaurs known from a complete skeleton, with a total length of 24–26 meters (79–85 ft). Modern mass estimates for D. carnegii have tended to be in the 12–14.8-metric-ton (13.2–16.3-short-ton) range. The type specimen CM 84 has been estimated at 26 metres (85 ft) in length.

No skull has ever been found that can be confidently said to belong to Diplodocus, though skulls of other diplodocids closely related to Diplodocus (such as Galeamopus) are well known. The skulls of diplodocids were very small compared with the size of these animals. Diplodocus had small, 'peg'-like teeth that pointed forward and were only present in the anterior sections of the jaws. Its braincase was small, and the neck was composed of at least 15 vertebrae.

=== Postcranial skeleton ===
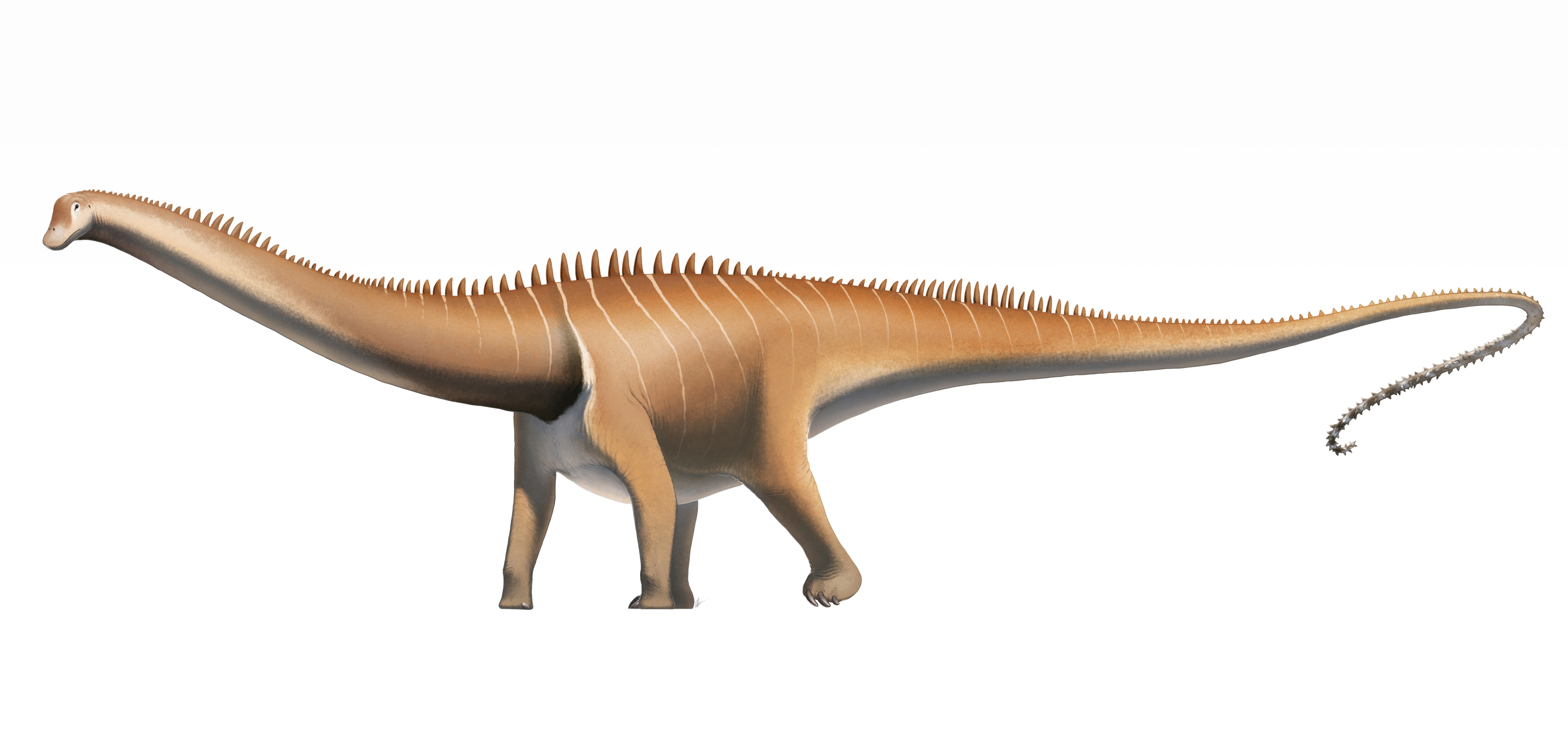
Reconstruction of D. carnegii with horizontal neck, flexible whip tail, keratinous spines and nostrils low on the snout

D. hallorum, known from partial remains, was even larger, and is estimated to have been the size of four elephants. When first described in 1991, discoverer David Gillette calculated it to be 33 metres (108 feet) long based on isometric scaling with D. carnegii. However, he later stated that this was unlikely and estimated it to be 39–45 meters (128–148 ft) long, suggesting that some individuals may have been up to 52 metres (171 feet) long and weighed 80 to 100 metric tons, making it the longest known dinosaur (excluding the species then known as Amphicoelias fragillimus, which at the time was reconstructed as a diplodocid of potentially even greater length, but is usually ignored because its only known remains are fragmentary and lost). The estimated length was later revised downward to 30.5–35 m (100–115 ft) and later on to 29–33.5 m (95–110 ft) based on findings that show that Gillette had originally misplaced vertebrae 12–19 as vertebrae 20–27. Weight estimates based on the revised length are as high as 38 metric tons (42 short tons) although more recently, and according to Gregory S. Paul, a 29 m (95 ft) long D. hallorum was estimated to weigh 23 metric tons (25 short tons) in body mass. A study in 2024 later found the mass of a 33 m (108 ft) D. hallorum to be only 21 metric tons (23 short tons), though the study suggested this only represents the average adult size and not the above average or maximum body size. The nearly complete D. carnegii skeleton at the Carnegie Museum of Natural History in Pittsburgh, Pennsylvania, on which size estimates of D. hallorum are mainly based, also was found to have had its 13th tail vertebra come from another dinosaur, throwing off size estimates for D. hallorum even further. While dinosaurs such as Supersaurus were probably longer, fossil remains of these animals are only fragmentary and D. hallorum still remains among the longest known dinosaurs.

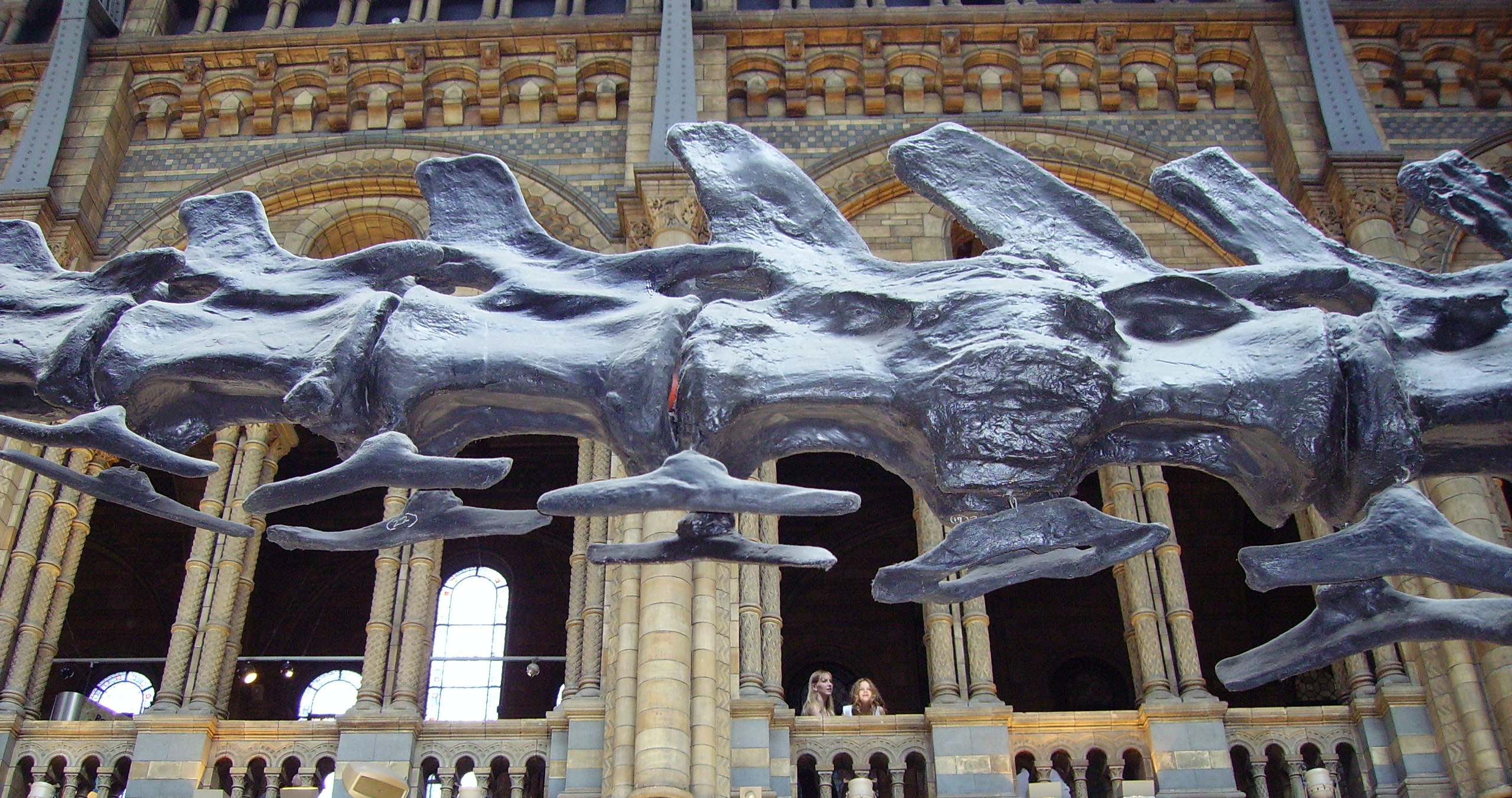
Caudal vertebrae of D. carnegii showing the double-beamed chevron bones to which the genus name refers, Natural History Museum, London

The estimated tail length of Diplodocus makes up approximately 55% of the total body length, with the tail sometimes hypothesized to be capable of functioning like a very long, tapering bullwhip. This extremely long tail is composed of about 80 caudal vertebrae, which are almost double the number some of the earlier sauropods had in their tails (such as Shunosaurus with 43), and far more than contemporaneous macronarians had (such as Camarasaurus with 53). Some speculation exists as to whether it may have had a defensive or noisemaking (by cracking it like a coachwhip) or, as more recently suggested, tactile function. The tail may have served as a counterbalance for the neck. The middle part of the tail had "double beams" (oddly shaped chevron bones on the underside, which gave Diplodocus its name). They may have provided support for the vertebrae, or perhaps prevented the blood vessels from being crushed if the animal's heavy tail pressed against the ground. These "double beams" are also seen in some related dinosaurs. Chevron bones of this particular form were initially believed to be unique to Diplodocus; since then they have been discovered in other members of the diplodocid family as well as in non-diplodocid sauropods, such as Mamenchisaurus.

Like other sauropods, the manus (front "feet") of Diplodocus were highly modified, with the finger and hand bones arranged into a vertical column, horseshoe-shaped in cross section. Diplodocus lacked claws on all but one digit of the front limb, and this claw was unusually large relative to other sauropods, flattened from side to side, and detached from the bones of the hand. The function of this unusually specialized claw is unknown.

=== Skin impressions ===
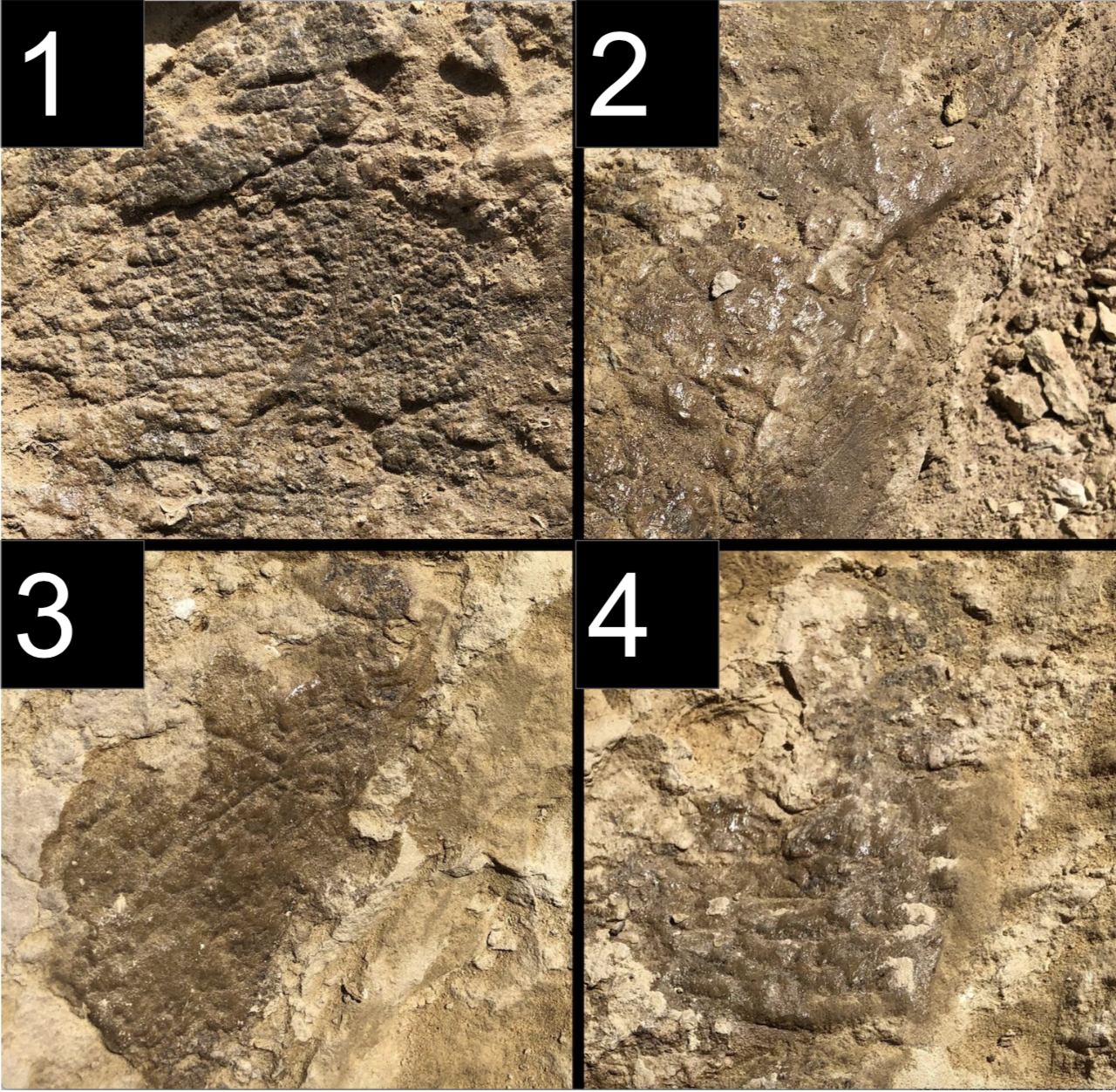
Diplodocus sp. scale shapes. These scale shapes include (1) rectangular, (2) ovoid and dome, (3) arching scale rows, (4) globular.

The discovery of partial diplodocid skin impressions in 1990 showed that some species had narrow, pointed, keratinous spines, much like those on an iguana. The spines could be up to 18 centimeters (7.1 in) long, on the "whiplash" portion of their tails, and possibly along the back and neck as well, similarly to hadrosaurids. The spines have been incorporated into many recent reconstructions of Diplodocus, notably Walking with Dinosaurs. The original description of the spines noted that the specimens in the Howe Quarry near Shell, Wyoming were associated with skeletal remains of an undescribed diplodocid "resembling Diplodocus and Barosaurus." Specimens from this quarry have since been referred to Kaatedocus siberi and Barosaurus sp., rather than Diplodocus.

Fossilized skin of Diplodocus sp., discovered at the Mother's Day Quarry, exhibits several different types of scale shapes including rectangular, polygonal, pebble, ovoid, dome, and globular. These scales range in size and shape depending upon their location on the integument, the smallest of which reach about 1mm while the largest 10 mm. Some of these scales show orientations that may indicate where they belonged on the body. For instance, the ovoid scales are closely clustered together and look similar to scales in modern reptiles that are located dorsally. Another orientation on the fossil consists of arching rows of square scales that interrupts nearby polygonal scale patterning. It is noted that the arching scale rows look similar to the scale orientations seen around crocodilian limbs, suggesting that this area may have also originated from around a limb on the Diplodocus. The skin fossil itself is small in size, reaching less than 70 cm in length. Due to the vast amount of scale diversity seen within such a small area, as well as the scales being smaller in comparison to other diplodocid scale fossils, and the presence of small and potentially "juvenile" material at the Mother's Day Quarry, it is hypothesized that the skin originated from a small or even "juvenile" Diplodocus. In 2025, Gallagher et al. identified probable melanosomes representing diverse colours based on microbodies found within epidermis in the scales of juvenile specimens of Diplodocus sp. from the same quarry, including the specimen first described by Gallagher et al. (2021). A response paper was published in 2026 questioning the study's methods.

== Discovery and history ==
=== Bone Wars and Diplodocus longus ===
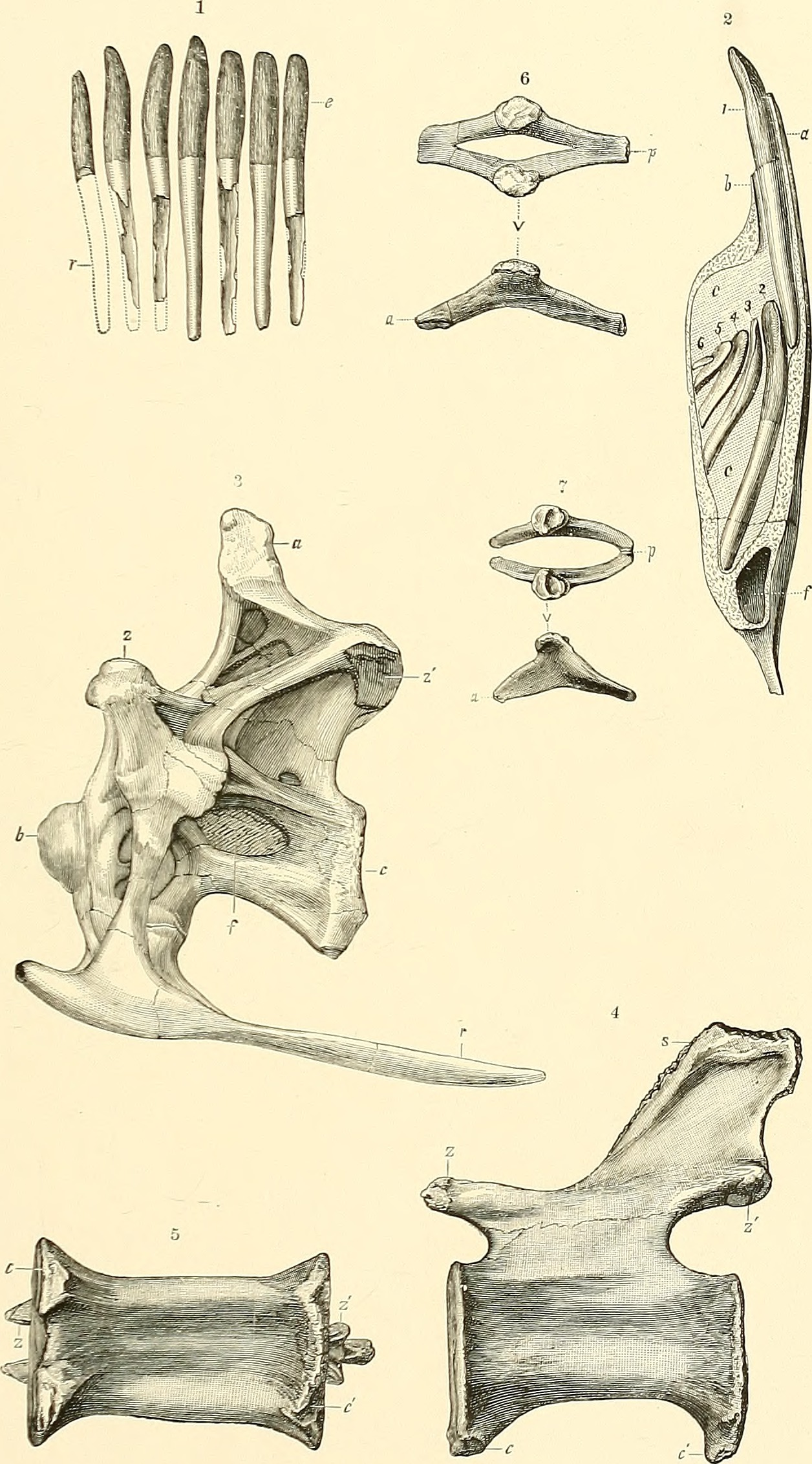
Several elements referred to Diplodocus longus, including a type caudal at the bottom, as figured in Marsh, 1896

The first record of Diplodocus comes from Marshall P. Felch's quarry at Garden Park near Cañon City, Colorado, when several fossils were collected by Benjamin Mudge and Samuel Wendell Williston in 1877. The first specimen (YPM VP 1920) was very incomplete, consisting only of two complete caudal vertebrae, a chevron, and several other fragmentary caudal vertebrae. The specimen was sent to the Yale Peabody Museum and was named Diplodocus longus ('long double-beam') by paleontologist Othniel Charles Marsh in 1878. Marsh named Diplodocus during the Bone Wars, his competition with Philadelphian paleontologist Edward Drinker Cope to collect and describe as many fossil taxa as possible. Though several more complete specimens have been attributed to D. longus, detailed analysis has discovered that this type specimen is actually dubious, which is not an ideal situation for the type species of a well-known genus like Diplodocus. A petition to the International Commission on Zoological Nomenclature was being considered which proposed making D. carnegii the new type species. This proposal was rejected by the ICZN and D. longus has been maintained as the type species, because Hatcher did not demonstrate why the specimen he called Diplodocus carnegii was not actually just a more complete specimen of Diplodocus longus.

Although the type specimen was very fragmentary, several additional diplodocid fossils were collected at Felch's quarry from 1877 to 1884 and sent to Marsh, who then referred them to D. longus. One specimen (USNM V 2672), an articulated complete skull, mandibles, and partial atlas was collected in 1883, and was the first complete diplodocid skull to be reported. Tschopp et al.'s analysis placed it as an indeterminate diplodocine in 2015 due to the lack of overlap with any diagnostic Diplodocus postcranial material, as was the fate with all skulls assigned to Diplodocus.

=== Second Dinosaur Rush and Diplodocus carnegii ===
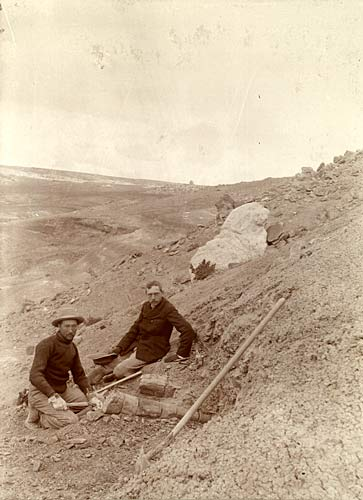
Barnum Brown (left) and Henry Osborn (right) excavating a femur of specimen AMNH 223, 1897

After the end of the Bone Wars, many major institutions in the eastern United States were inspired by the depictions and finds by Marsh and Cope to assemble their own dinosaur fossil collections. The competition to mount the first sauropod skeleton specifically was the most intense, with the American Museum of Natural History, Carnegie Museum of Natural History, and Field Museum of Natural History all sending expeditions to the west to find the most complete sauropod specimen, bring it back to the home institution, and mount it in their fossil halls. The American Museum of Natural History was the first to launch an expedition, finding a semi-articulated partial postcranial skeleton containing many vertebrae of Diplodocus in at Como Bluff in 1897. The skeleton (AMNH FR 223) was collected by Barnum Brown and Henry Osborn, who shipped the specimen to the AMNH and it was briefly described in 1899 by Osborn, who referred it to D. longus. It was later mounted—the first Diplodocus mount made—and was the first well preserved individual skeleton of Diplodocus discovered. In Emmanuel Tschopp et al.'s phylogenetic analysis of Diplodocidae, AMNH FR 223 was found to be not a skeleton of D. longus, but the later named species D. hallorum. As seen in the supplementary work done by Suzannah Maidment (2024), AMNH FR 223 also appears to be the geologically youngest specimen of D. hallorum, as the quarry it was found in is within systems tract 6 (C6), which contains the youngest deposits in the Morrison Formation, as opposed to the other specimens of the taxon which were found in the older systems tract 4 (B4, which dates range from 151.88 Ma to 149.1 Ma).

The most notable Diplodocus find also came in 1899 on an expedition funded by Scottish-American steel tycoon Andrew Carnegie, when crew members from the Carnegie Museum of Natural History discovered a massive and well preserved skeleton of Diplodocus in the Morrison Formation of Sheep Creek, Wyoming. The skeleton was collected that year, along with several specimens of Stegosaurus, Brontosaurus parvus, and Camarasaurus preserved alongside the skeleton, by a crew under the direction of Jacob L. Wortman. The skeleton (CM 84) was preserved in semi articulation and was very complete, including 41 well preserved vertebrae from the mid caudals to the anterior cervicals, 18 ribs, 2 sternal ribs, a partial pelvis, right scapulocoracoid, and right femur. In 1900, Carnegie crews returned to Sheep Creek on an expedition led by John Bell Hatcher, William Jacob Holland, and Charles Gilmore and discovered another well preserved skeleton of Diplodocus adjacent to the specimen collected in 1899. The second skeleton (CM 94) was from a smaller individual and had preserved fewer vertebrae, but preserved more caudal vertebrae and appendicular remains than CM 84. Both of the skeletons were named and described in great detail by John Bell Hatcher in 1901, with Hatcher making CM 84 the type specimen of a new species of Diplodocus, Diplodocus carnegii ("Andrew Carnegie's double beam"), with CM 94 becoming the paratype. As the first dinosaur collected by the Carnegie Museum, the specimen was named after their patron, Andrew Carnegie.

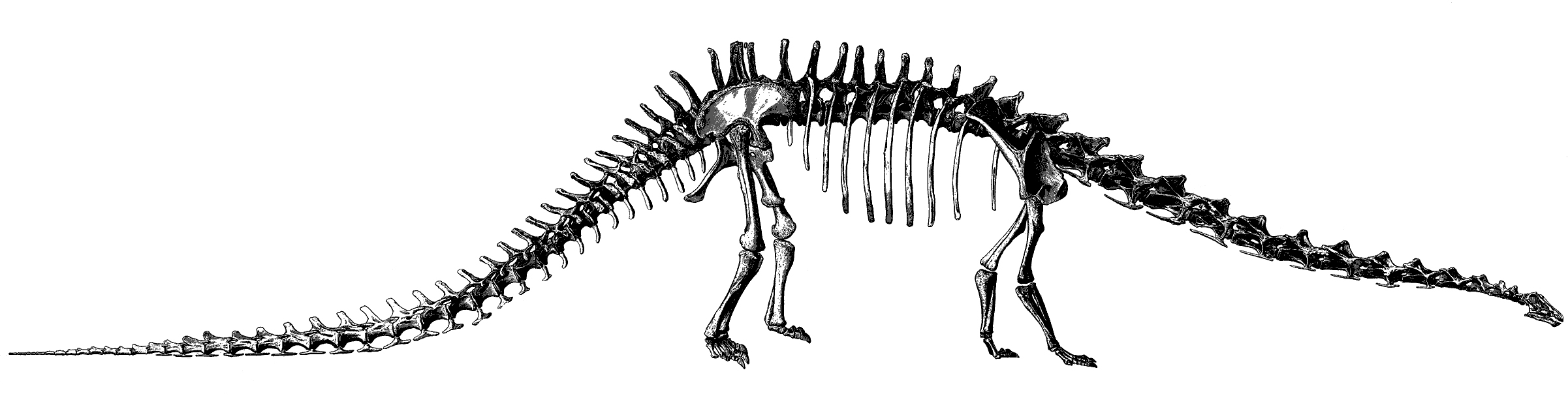
Hatcher's original composite skeletal reconstruction of Diplodocus carnegii, 1901

It was not until 1907, that the Carnegie Museum of Natural History created a composite mount of Diplodocus carnegii that incorporated CM 84 and CM 94 along with several other specimens and even other taxa were used to complete the mount, including a skull molded based on USNM 2673, a skull assigned to Galeamopus pabsti. The Carnegie Museum mount became very popular, being nicknamed "Dippy" by the populace, eventually being cast and sent to museums in London, Berlin, Paris, Vienna, Bologna, St. Petersburg, Buenos Aires, Madrid, and Mexico City from 1905 to 1928. The London cast specifically became very popular; its casting was requested by King Edward VII and it was the first sauropod mount put on display outside of the United States. The goal of Carnegie in sending these casts overseas was apparently to bring international unity and mutual interest around the discovery of the dinosaur.

=== Dinosaur National Monument ===
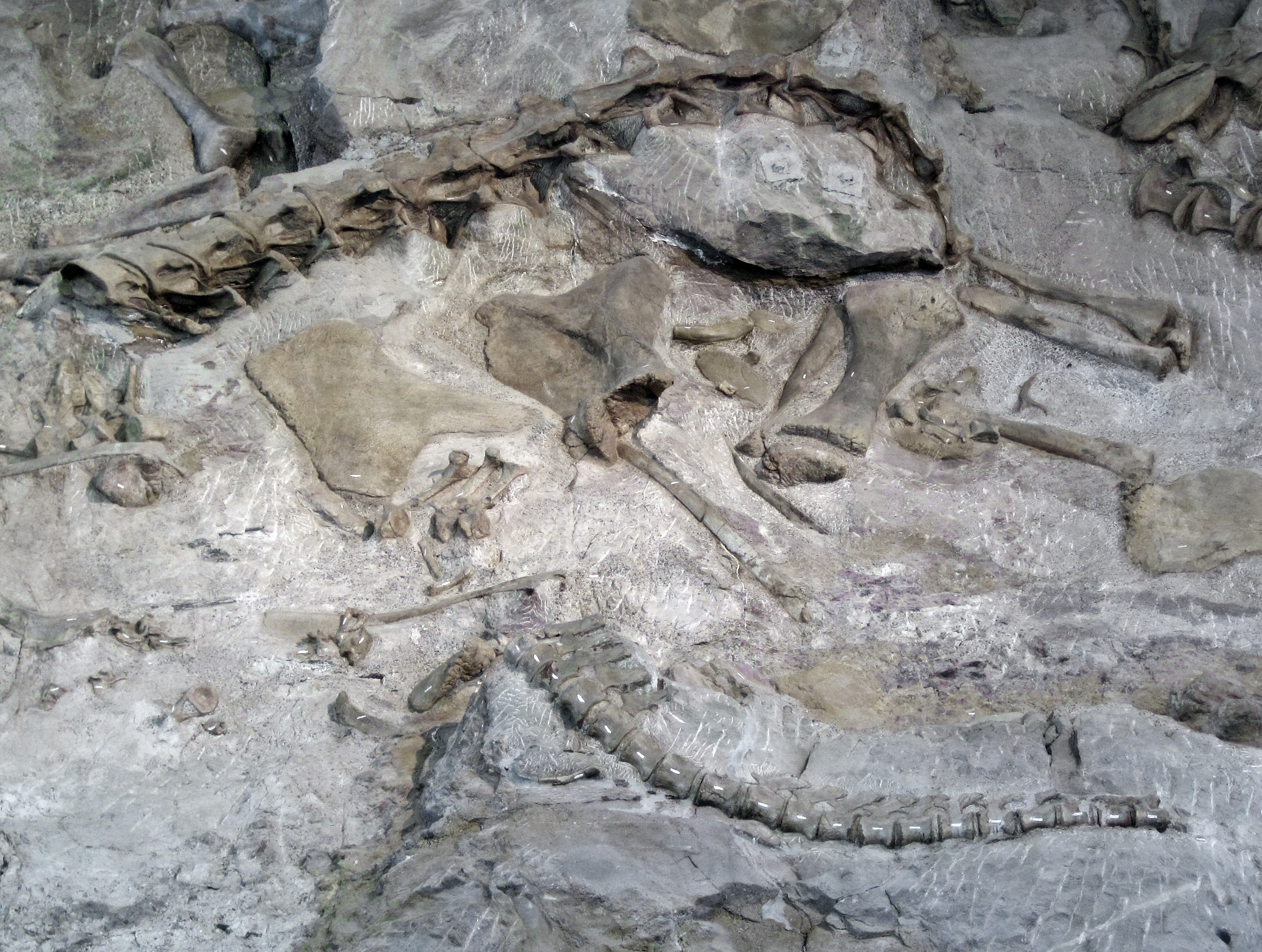
Necks of two specimens embedded in the Dinosaur National Monument

The Carnegie Museum of Natural History made another landmark discovery in 1909 when Earl Douglass unearthed several caudal vertebrae from Apatosaurus in what is now Dinosaur National Monument on the border region between Colorado and Utah, with the sandstone dating to the Kimmeridgian of the Morrison Formation. From 1909 to 1922, with the Carnegie Museum excavating the quarry, eventually unearthing over 120 dinosaur individuals and 1,600+ bones, many of the associated skeletons being very complete and are on display in several American museums. In 1912, Douglass found a semi articulated skull of a diplodocine with mandibles (CM 11161) in the Monument. Another skull (CM 3452) was found by Carnegie crews in 1915, bearing 6 articulated cervical vertebrae and mandibles, and another skull with mandibles (CM 1155) was found in 1923. All of the skulls found at Dinosaur National Monument were shipped back to Pittsburgh and described by William Jacob Holland in detail in 1924, who referred the specimens to D. longus. This assignment was also questioned by Tschopp, who stated that all of the aforementioned skulls could not be referred to any specific diplodocine. Hundreds of assorted postcranial elements were found in the Monument that have been referred to Diplodocus, but few have been properly described. A nearly complete skull of a juvenile Diplodocus was collected by Douglass in 1921, and it is the first known from a Diplodocus.

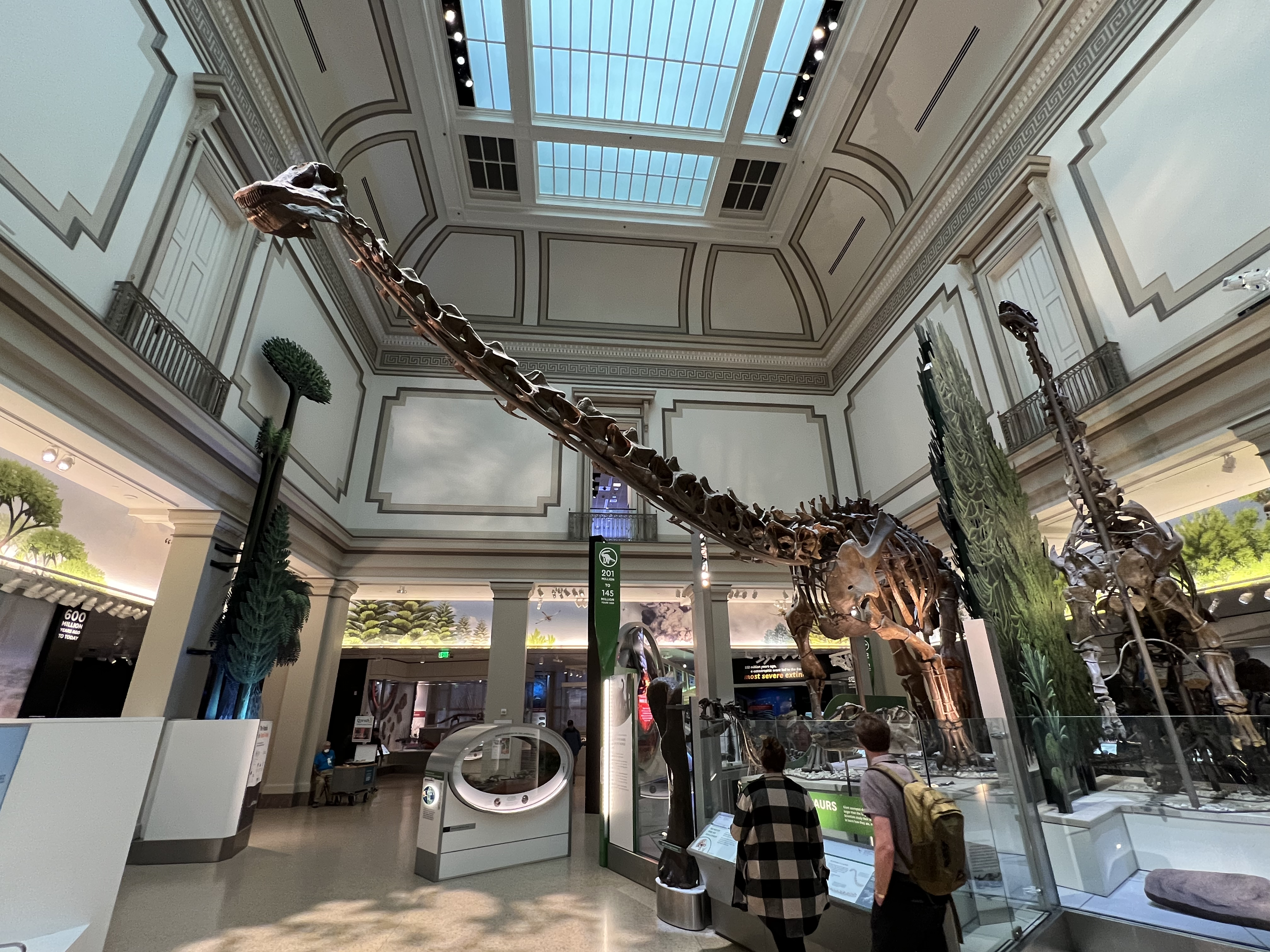
The skeleton at National Museum of Natural History

Another Diplodocus skeleton was collected at the Carnegie Quarry in Dinosaur National Monument, Utah, by the National Museum of Natural History in 1923. The skeleton (USNM V 10865) is one of the most complete known from Diplodocus, consisting of a semi-articulated partial postcranial skeleton, including a well preserved dorsal column. The skeleton was briefly described by Charles Gilmore in 1932, who also referred it to D. longus, and it was mounted in the fossil hall at the National Museum of Natural History the same year. In Emmanuel Tschopp et al.'s phylogenetic analysis of Diplodocidae, USNM V 10865 was also found to be an individual of D. hallorum. The Denver Museum of Nature and Science obtained a Diplodocus specimen through exchange from the Carnegie Museum that had been collected at Dinosaur National Monument. The specimen (DMNH 1494) was nearly as complete as the Smithsonian specimen. It consists of the vertebral column complete from cervical 8 to caudal 20, right scapula-coracoid, complete pelvis, and both hind limbs without feet. It was mounted in the museum during the late 1930s and remounted in the early 1990s. Although not described in detail, Tschopp and colleagues determined that this skeleton also belonged to D. hallorum.

=== Later discoveries and D. hallorum ===
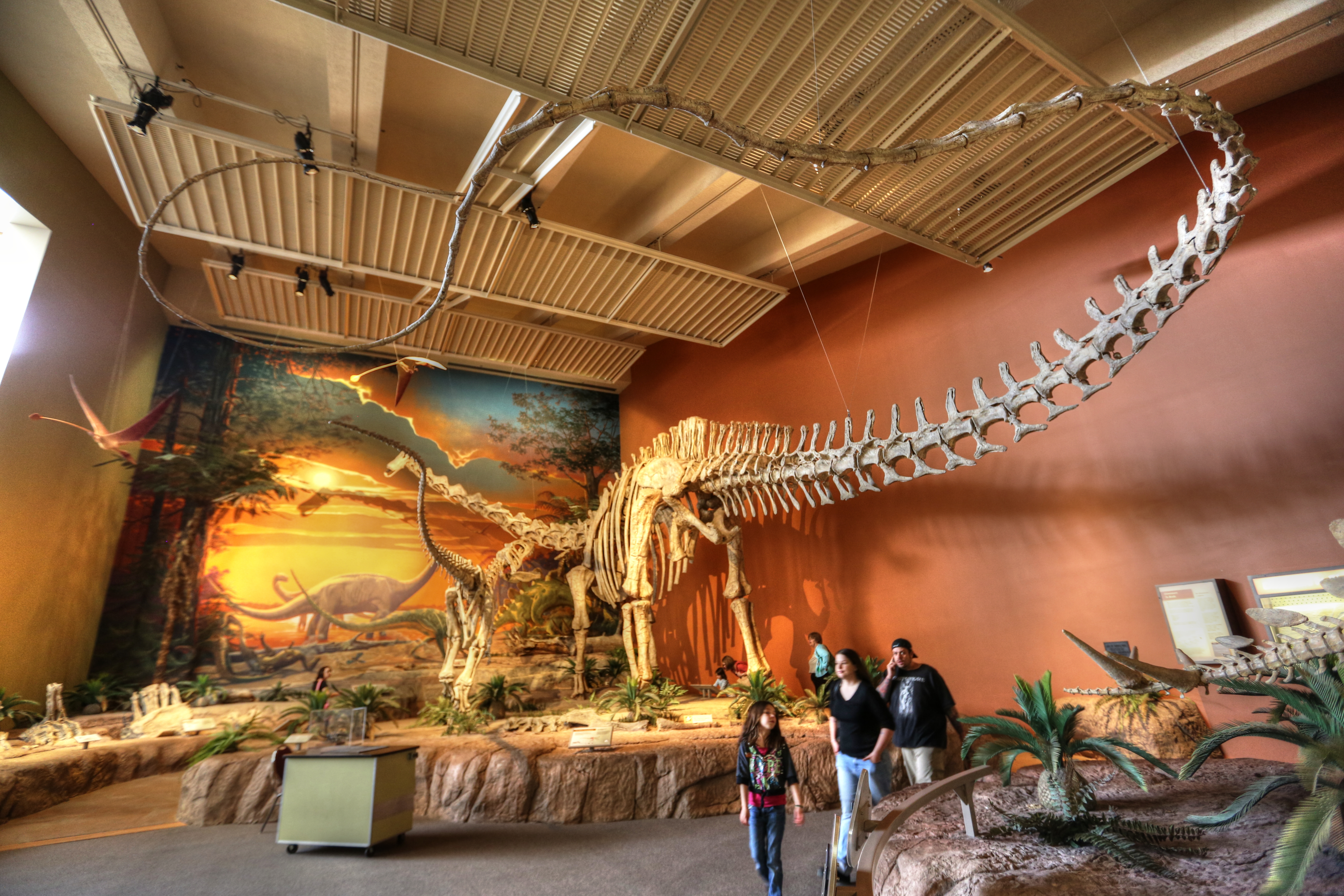
Allosaurus and D. hallorum, New Mexico Museum of Natural History and Science

Few Diplodocus finds came for many years until 1979, when three hikers came across several vertebrae stuck in elevated stone next to several petroglyphs in a canyon west of San Ysidro, New Mexico. The find was reported to the New Mexican Museum of Natural History, who dispatched an expedition led by David D. Gillette in 1985, that collected the specimen after several visits from 1985 to 1990. The specimen was preserved in semi-articulation, including 230 gastroliths, with several vertebrae, partial pelvis, and right femur and was prepared and deposited at the New Mexican Museum of Natural History under NMMNH P-3690. The specimen was not described until 1991 in the Journal of Paleontology, where Gillette named it Seismosaurus halli (Jim and Ruth Hall's seismic lizard), though in 1994, Gillette published an amendment changing the name to S. hallorum. In 2004 and later 2006, Seismosaurus was synonymized with Diplodocus and even suggested to be synonymous with the dubious D. longus and later Tschopp et al.'s phylogenetic analysis in 2015 supported the idea that many specimens referred to D. longus actually belonged to D. hallorum.

In 1994, the Museum of the Rockies discovered a very productive fossil site at Mother's Day Quarry in Carbon County, Montana from the Salt Wash member of the Morrison Formation that was later excavated by the Cincinnati Museum of Natural History and Science in 1996, and after that the Bighorn Basin Paleontological Institute in 2017. The quarry was very productive, having mostly isolated Diplodocus bones from juveniles to adults in pristine preservation. The quarry notably had a great disparity between the amount of juveniles and adults in the quarry, as well as the frequent preservation of skin impressions, pathologies, and some articulated specimens from Diplodocus. One specimen, a nearly complete skull of a juvenile Diplodocus, was found at the quarry and is one of few known and highlighted ontogenetic dietary changes in the genus. In the Lourinhã Formation of Portugal, two partial skeletons SHN 177 and 178 were discovered and regarded as representing the same taxon. These specimens were long regarded as closely related to Diplodocus and further studies have suggested they represent potential specimens of Diplodocus. In 2026, diagnostic remains of Diplodocus were found in the Upper Jurassic Villar del Arzobispo Formation of Spain, but not assigned to any particular species.

== Classification and species ==
=== Phylogeny ===
Diplodocus is both the type genus of, and gives its name to, the Diplodocidae, the family in which it belongs. Members of this family, while still massive, have a markedly more slender build than other sauropods, such as the titanosaurs and brachiosaurs. All are characterized by long necks and tails and a horizontal posture, with forelimbs shorter than hind limbs. Diplodocids flourished in the Late Jurassic of North America and possibly Africa.

A subfamily, the Diplodocinae, was erected to include Diplodocus and its closest relatives, including Barosaurus. More distantly related is the contemporaneous Apatosaurus, which is still considered a diplodocid, although not a diplodocine, as it is a member of the sister subfamily Apatosaurinae. The Portuguese Dinheirosaurus and the African Tornieria have also been identified as close relatives of Diplodocus by some authors. Diplodocoidea comprises the diplodocids, as well as the dicraeosaurids, rebbachisaurids, Suuwassea, Amphicoelias possibly Haplocanthosaurus, and/or the nemegtosaurids. The clade is the sister group to Macronaria (camarasaurids, brachiosaurids and titanosaurians).

A cladogram of the Diplodocidae after Tschopp, Mateus, and Benson (2015) below:

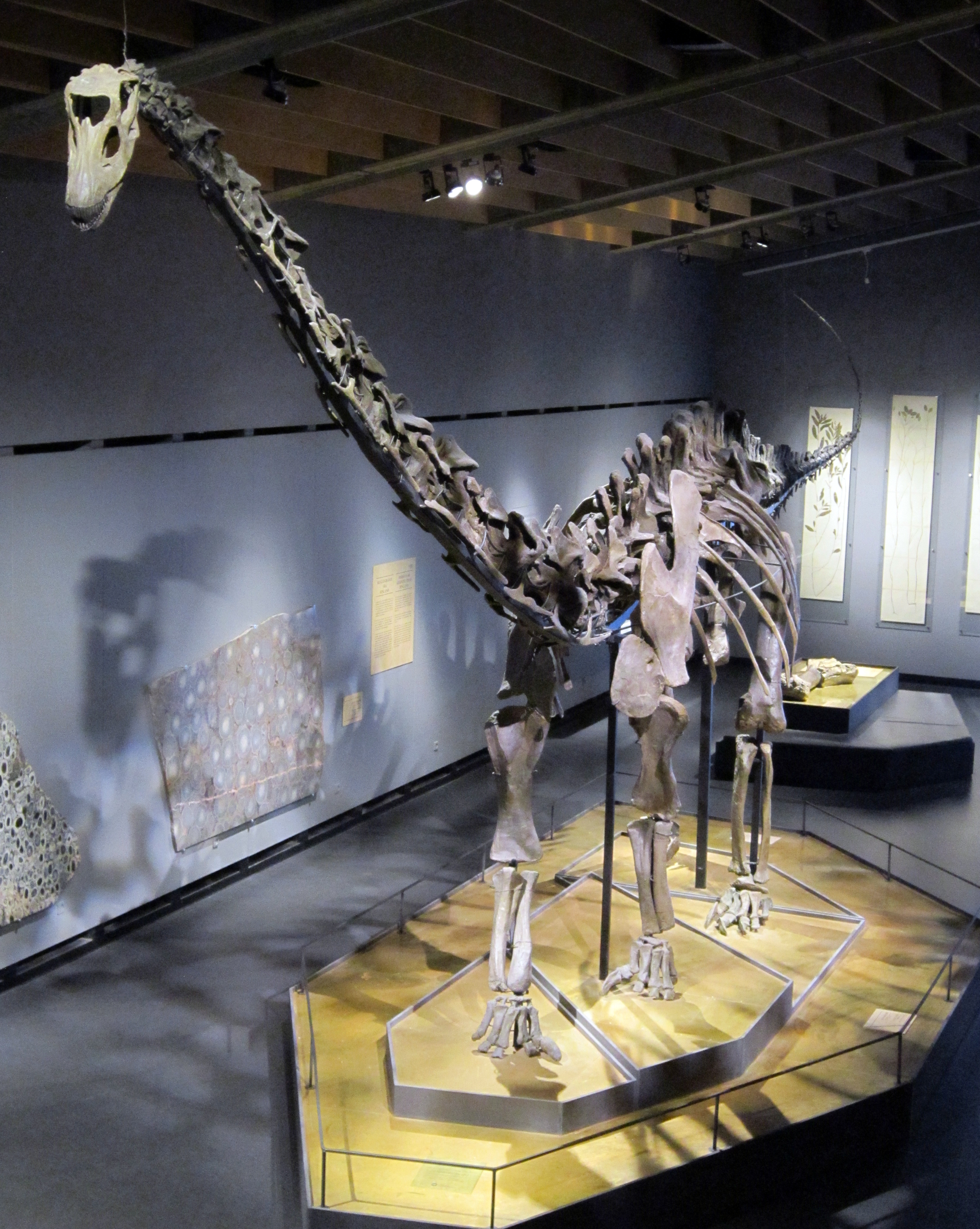
Diplodocus sp. skeleton nicknamed "Misty", Zoological Museum of Copenhagen

- Diplodocidae
  - Amphicoelias altus
  - - Apatosaurinae
      - Unnamed species
      - - - Apatosaurus ajax
          - Apatosaurus louisae
        - - Brontosaurus excelsus
          - - Brontosaurus yahnahpin
            - Brontosaurus parvus
    - Diplodocinae
      - Unnamed species
      - - Tornieria africana
        - - - Supersaurus lourinhanensis
            - Supersaurus vivianae
          - - Leinkupal laticauda
            - - Galeamopus hayi
              - - - Diplodocus carnegii
                  - Diplodocus hallorum
                - - Kaatedocus siberi
                  - Barosaurus lentus

=== Valid species ===
- Diplodocus carnegii (also spelled incorrectly D. carnegiei), named after Andrew Carnegie, is the best known, mainly due to a near-complete skeleton known as Dippy (specimen CM 84) collected by Jacob Wortman, of the Carnegie Museum of Natural History in Pittsburgh, Pennsylvania, and described and named by John Bell Hatcher in 1901.
- Diplodocus hallorum, first described in 1991 by Gillette as Seismosaurus halli from a partial skeleton comprising vertebrae, pelvis and ribs (specimen NMMNH P-3690). As the specific name honors two people, Jim and Ruth Hall (of Ghost Ranch), George Olshevsky later suggested to emend the name as S. hallorum, using the mandatory genitive plural; Gillette then emended the name, which usage has been followed by others, including Carpenter (2006). In 2004, a presentation at the annual conference of the Geological Society of America made a case for Seismosaurus being a junior synonym of Diplodocus. This was followed by a much more detailed publication in 2006, which not only renamed the species Diplodocus hallorum, but also speculated that it could prove to be the same as D. longus. The position that D. hallorum should be regarded as a specimen of D. longus was also taken by the authors of a redescription of Supersaurus, refuting a previous hypothesis that Seismosaurus and Supersaurus were the same. A 2015 analysis of diplodocid relationships noted that these opinions are based on the more complete referred specimens of Diplodocus longus. The authors of this analysis concluded that those specimens were indeed the same species as D. hallorum, but that D. longus itself was a nomen dubium but a position that was rejected by the International Commission on Zoological Nomenclature as discussed above.

=== Nomina dubia (doubtful species) ===
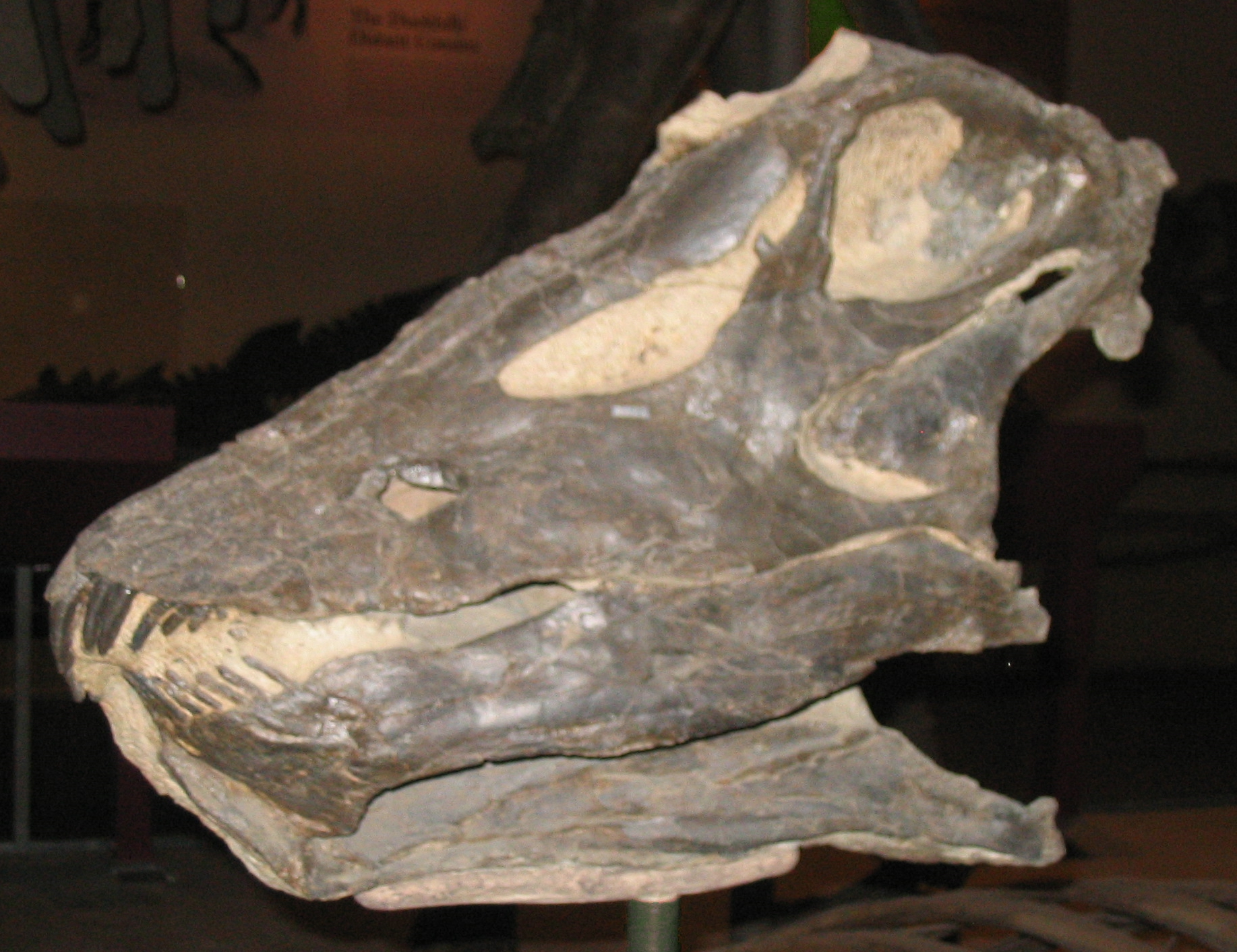
USNM 2672, a skull formerly thought to have belonged to the holotype of D. longus

- Diplodocus longus, the type species, is known from two complete and several fragmentary caudal vertebrae from the Morrison Formation (Felch Quarry) of Colorado. Though several more complete specimens have been attributed to D. longus, detailed analysis has suggested that the original fossil lacks the necessary features to allow comparison with other specimens. For this reason, it has been considered a nomen dubium, which Tschopp et al. regarded as not an ideal situation for the type species of a well-known genus like Diplodocus. A petition to the International Commission on Zoological Nomenclature (ICZN) was being considered, which proposed to make D. carnegii the new type species. The proposal was rejected by the ICZN and D. longus has been maintained as the type species. However, in comments responding to the petition, some authors regarded D. longus as potentially valid after all.
- Diplodocus lacustris was named by Marsh in 1884 based on a snout with comparatively slender teeth (YPM 1922) from Morrison, Colorado. In 2015, Tschopp and colleagues argued that the snout of the specimen actually belonged to Camarasaurus, and that the teeth cannot be identified to a particular genus. D. lacustris would therefore be an indeterminate diplodocid and a nomen dubium.

=== Formerly assigned species ===
- Diplodocus hayi was named by William Jacob Holland in 1924 based on a braincase and partial postcranial skeleton (HMNS 175), including a nearly complete vertebral column, found in the Morrison Formation strata near Sheridan, Wyoming. D. hayi remained a species of Diplodocus until reassessment by Emmanuel Tschopp and colleagues determined that it was its own genus, Galeamopus, in 2015. The reassessment also found that the skulls AMNH 969 and USNM 2673 were not Diplodocus either and actually referred specimens of Galeamopus.

== Paleobiology ==
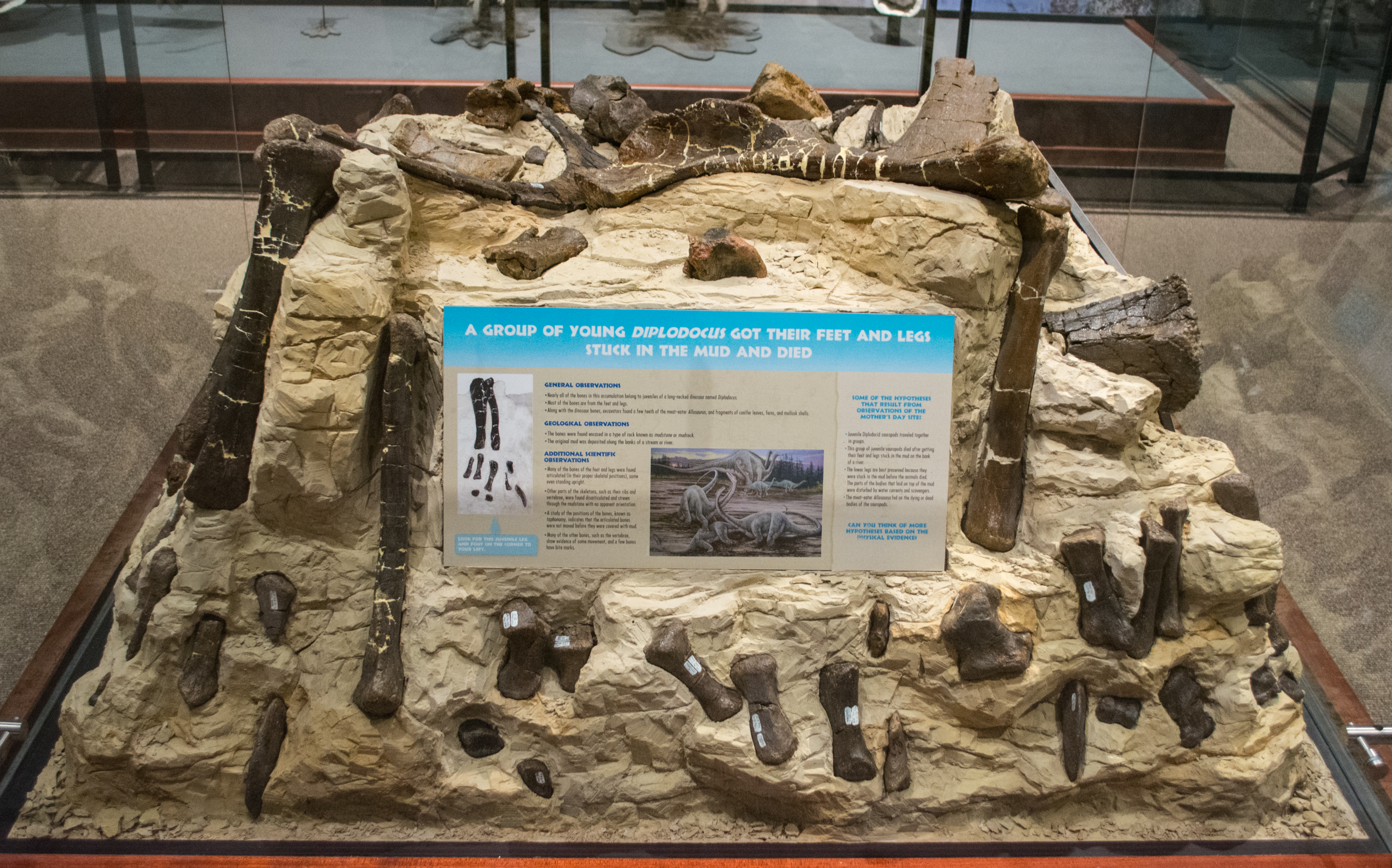
Leg bones of young specimens that appear to have become stuck in mud and died, Museum of the Rockies

Due to a wealth of skeletal remains, Diplodocus is one of the best-studied dinosaurs. Many aspects of its lifestyle have been subjects of various theories over the years. Comparisons between the scleral rings of diplodocines and modern birds and reptiles suggest that they may have been cathemeral, active throughout the day at short intervals. Diplodocus is estimated to have walked at a speed of 1.24 meters per second (4.5 km/h; 2.8 mph).

Marsh and then Hatcher assumed that the animal was aquatic, because of the position of its nasal openings at the apex of the cranium. Similar aquatic behavior was commonly depicted for other large sauropods, such as Brachiosaurus and Apatosaurus. A 1951 study by Kenneth A. Kermack indicates that sauropods probably could not have breathed through their nostrils when the rest of the body was submerged, as the water pressure on the chest wall would be too great. Since the 1970s, general consensus has the sauropods as firmly terrestrial animals, browsing on trees, ferns, and bushes.

Scientists have debated as to how sauropods were able to breathe with their large body sizes and long necks, which would have increased the amount of dead space. They likely had an avian respiratory system, which is more efficient than a mammalian and reptilian system. Reconstructions of the neck and thorax of Diplodocus show great pneumaticity, which could have played a role in respiration as it does in birds.

=== Posture ===
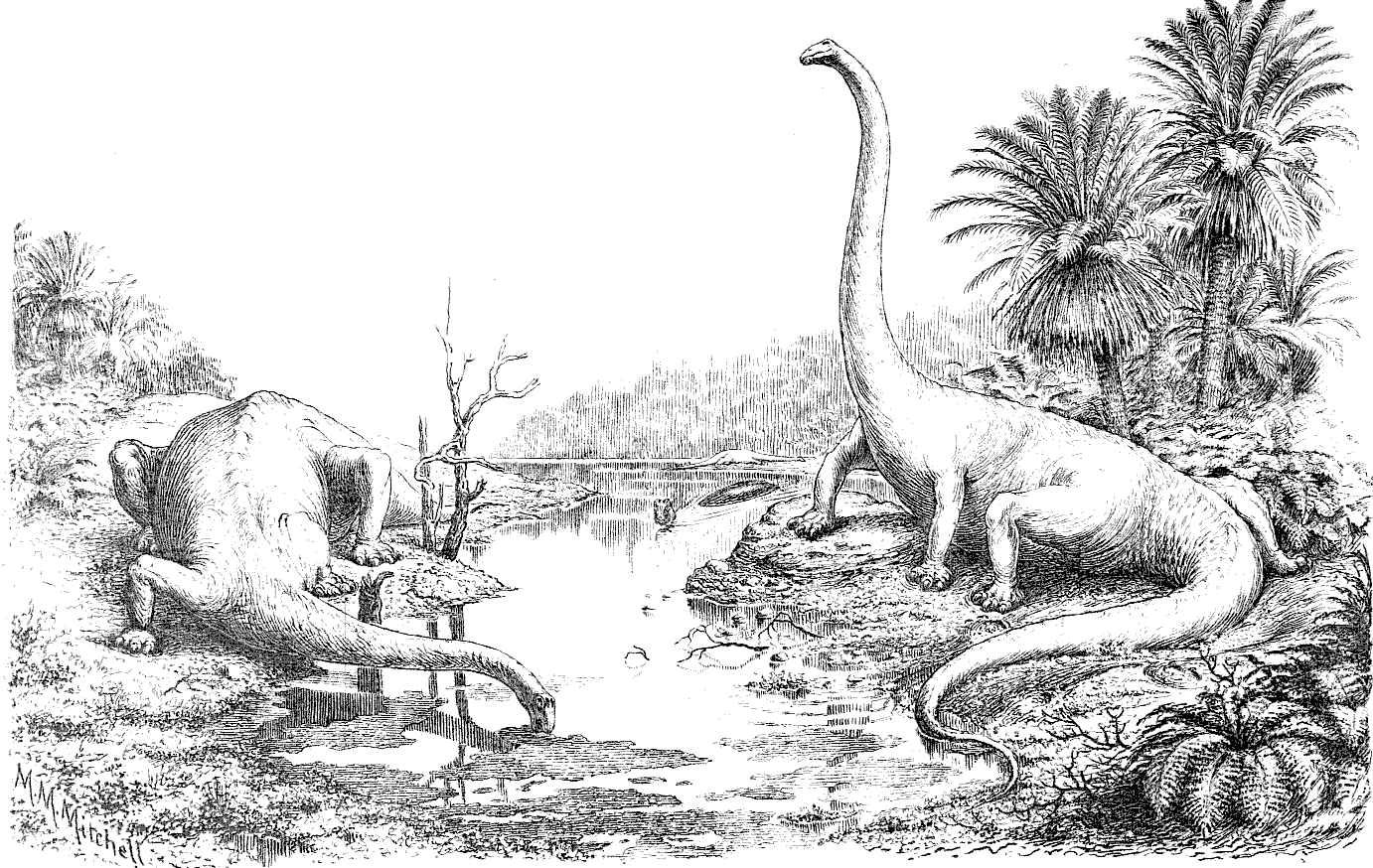
An outdated depiction by Oliver P. Hay (1910), with sprawled limbs

The depiction of Diplodocus posture has changed considerably over the years. For instance, a classic 1910 reconstruction by Oliver P. Hay depicts two Diplodocus with splayed lizard-like limbs on the banks of a river. Hay argued that Diplodocus had a sprawling, lizard-like gait with widely splayed legs, and was supported by Gustav Tornier. This hypothesis was contested by William Jacob Holland, who demonstrated that a sprawling Diplodocus would have needed a trench through which to pull its belly. Finds of sauropod footprints in the 1930s eventually put Hay's theory to rest.

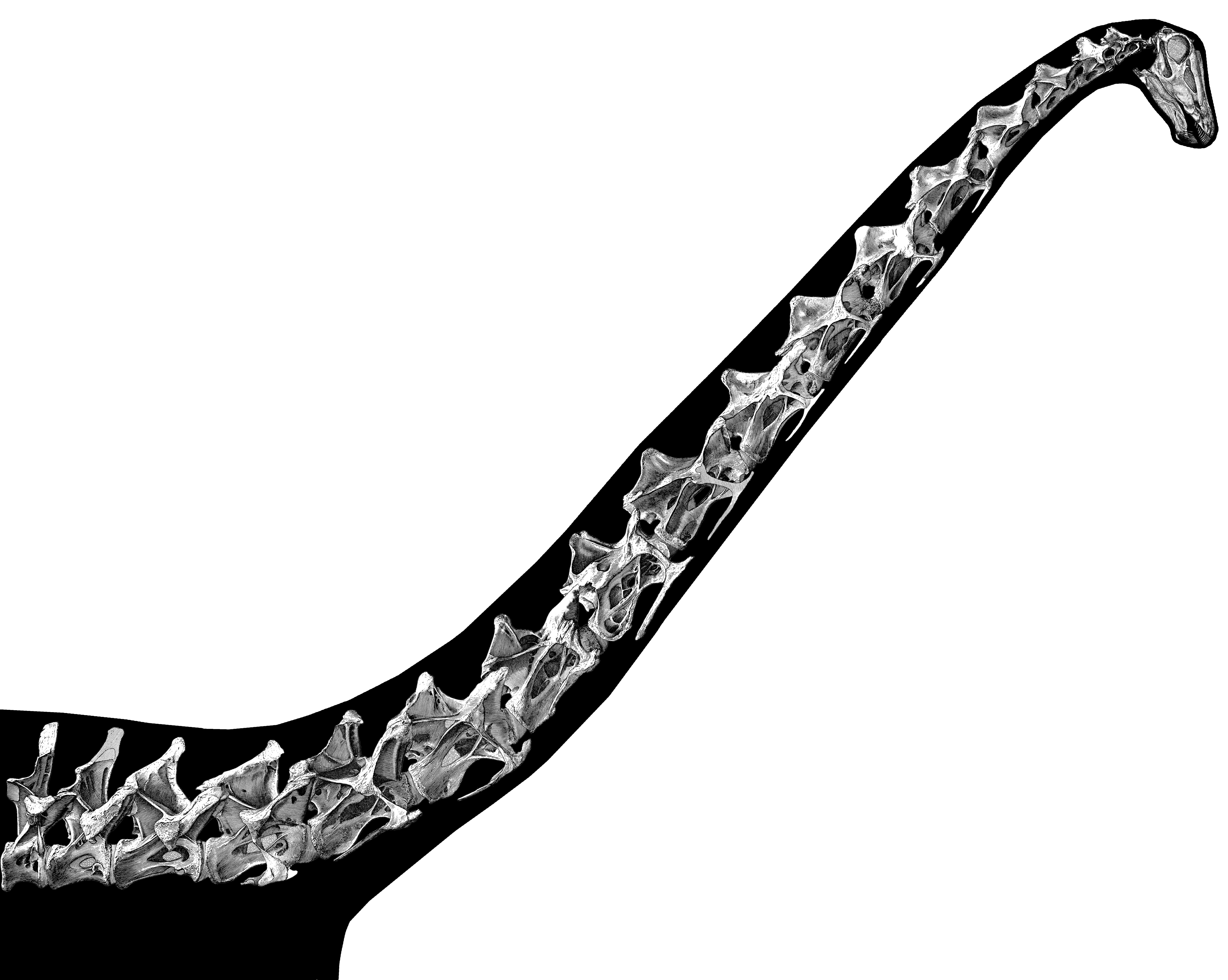
Upright neck pose for D. carnegii based on Taylor et al. (2009)

Later, diplodocids were often portrayed with their necks held high up in the air, allowing them to graze from tall trees. Studies looking at the morphology of sauropod necks have concluded that the neutral posture of Diplodocus neck was close to horizontal, rather than vertical, and scientists such as Kent Stevens have used this to argue that sauropods including Diplodocus did not raise their heads much above shoulder level. A nuchal ligament may have held the neck in this position. One approach to understanding the possible ligament structure in ancient sauropods is to study the ligaments and their attachments to bones in extant animals to see if they resemble any bony structures in sauropods or other dinosaur species like Parasaurolophus. If Diplodocus relied on a mammal-like nuchal ligament, it would have been for passively sustaining the weight of its head and neck. This ligament is found in many hoofed mammals, such as bison and horses. In mammals, it typically consists of a funiculus cord that runs from the external occipital crest of the skull to elongate vertebral neural spines or "withers" in the shoulder region plus sheet-like extensions called laminae run from the cord to the neural spines on some or all of the cervical vertebrae. However, most sauropods do not have withers in the shoulders, so if they possessed a similar ligament, it would differ substantially, perhaps anchoring in the hip region.

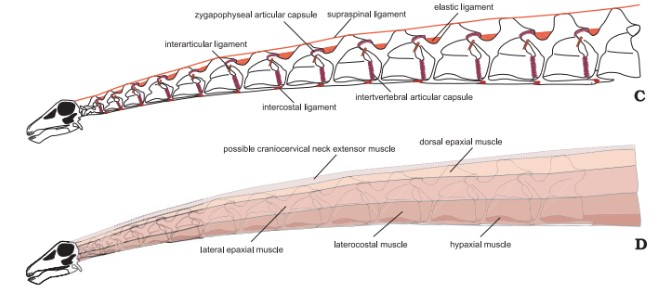
A reconstruction of the neck ligament structure of Diplodocus. The depiction of the entire neck seen in C and D shows where the possible elastic and supraspinal ligaments in addition to muscle groups could have been located

Another hypothesized neck-supporting ligament is an avian-like elastic ligament, such as that seen in Struthio camelus. This ligament acts similarly to the mammal-like nuchal ligament but comprises short segments of ligament that connect the bases of the neural spines, and therefore does not need a robust attachment zone like those seen in mammals. A 2009 study found that all tetrapods appear to hold the base of their necks at the maximum possible vertical extension when in a normal, alert posture, and argued that the same would hold true for sauropods barring any unknown, unique characteristics that set the soft tissue anatomy of their necks apart from other animals. The study found faults with Stevens' assumptions regarding the potential range of motion in sauropod necks, and based on comparing skeletons to living animals the study also argued that soft tissues could have increased flexibility more than the bones alone suggest. For these reasons they argued that Diplodocus would have held its neck at a more elevated angle than previous studies have concluded. However, this idea might be contradicted due to the inner ear of diplodocoids actually being in alignment for a horizontal neck pose. Also, it is not necessarily accurate to say that the alert pose is the osteologically normal position.

As with the related genus Barosaurus, the very long neck of Diplodocus is the source of much controversy among scientists. A 1992 Columbia University study of diplodocid neck structure indicated that the longest necks would have required a 1.6-ton heart – a tenth of the animal's body weight. The study proposed that animals like these would have had rudimentary auxiliary "hearts" in their necks, whose only purpose was to pump blood up to the next "heart". Some argue that the near-horizontal posture of the head and neck would have eliminated the problem of supplying blood to the brain, as it would not be elevated.

=== Diet and feeding ===
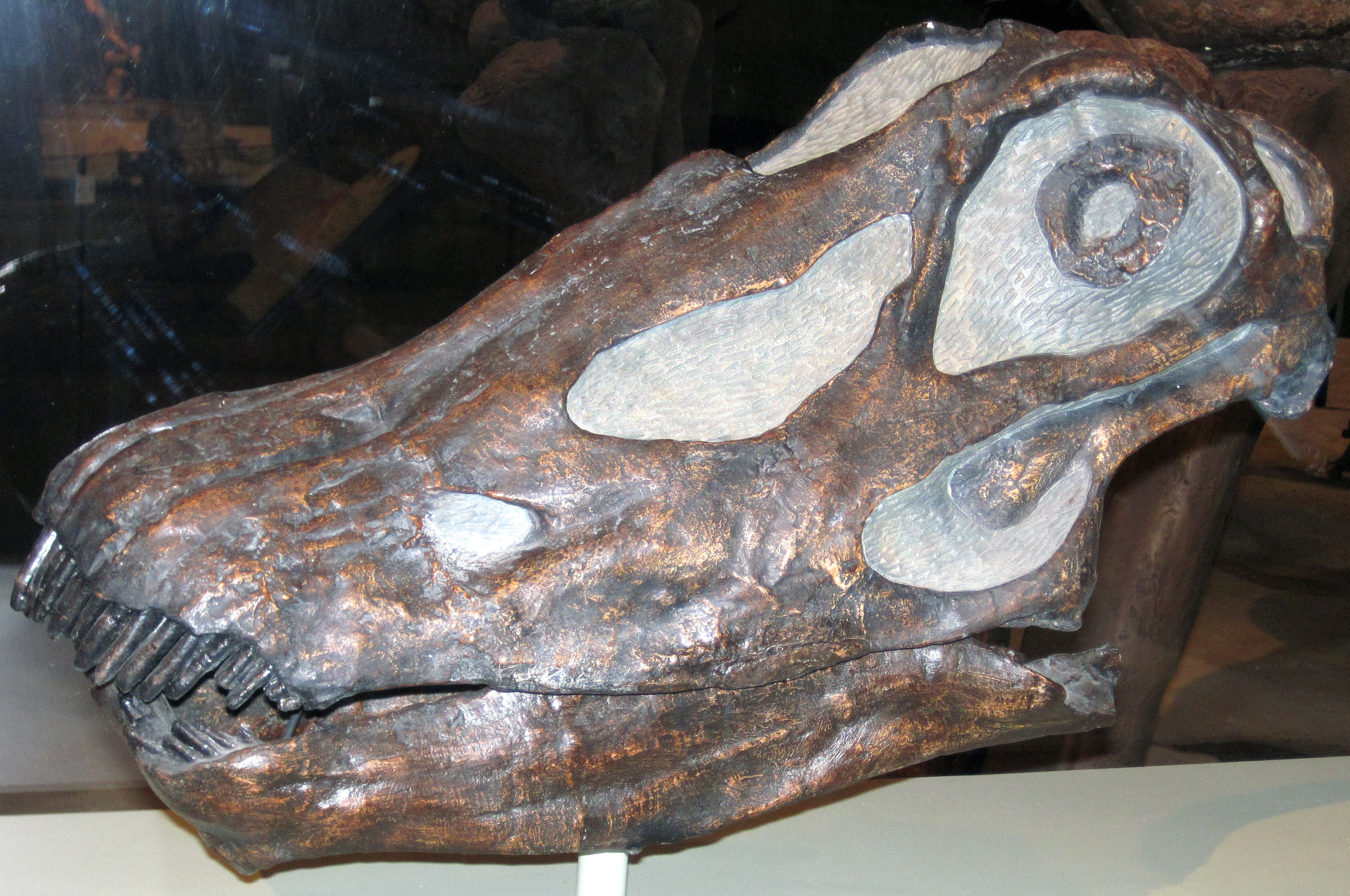
Cast of a diplodocid skull that may belong to a species of Diplodocus (CM 11161)

Diplodocines have highly unusual teeth compared to other sauropods. The crowns are long and slender, and elliptical in cross-section, while the apex forms a blunt, triangular point. The most prominent wear facet is on the apex, though unlike all other wear patterns observed within sauropods, diplodocine wear patterns are on the labial (cheek) side of both the upper and lower teeth. This implies that the feeding mechanism of Diplodocus and other diplodocids was radically different from that of other sauropods. Unilateral branch stripping is the most likely feeding behavior of Diplodocus, as it explains the unusual wear patterns of the teeth (coming from tooth–food contact). In unilateral branch stripping, one tooth row would have been used to strip foliage from the stem, while the other would act as a guide and stabilizer. With the elongated preorbital (in front of the eyes) region of the skull, longer portions of stems could be stripped in a single action. Also, the palinal (backwards) motion of the lower jaws could have contributed two significant roles to feeding behavior: (1) an increased gape, and (2) allowed fine adjustments of the relative positions of the tooth rows, creating a smooth stripping action.

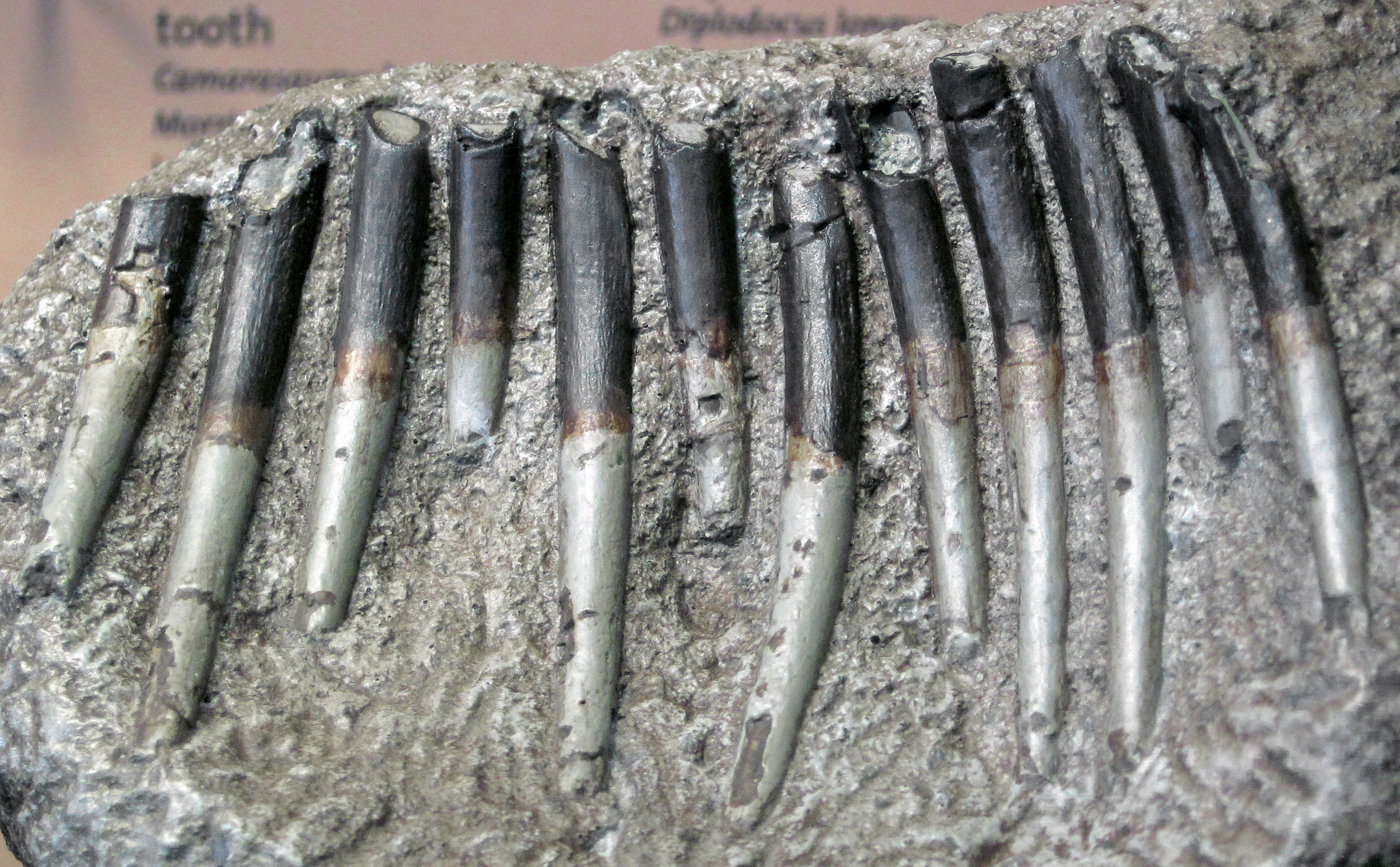
Teeth from the Dinosaur National Monument

Young et al. (2012) used biomechanical modeling to examine the performance of the diplodocine skull. It was concluded that the proposal that its dentition was used for bark-stripping was not supported by the data, which showed that under that scenario, the skull and teeth would undergo extreme stresses. The hypotheses of branch-stripping and/or precision biting were both shown to be biomechanically plausible feeding behaviors. Diplodocine teeth were also continually replaced throughout their lives, usually in less than 35 days, as was discovered by Michael D'Emic et al. Within each tooth socket, as many as five replacement teeth were developing to replace the next one. Studies of the teeth also reveal that it preferred different vegetation from the other sauropods of the Morrison, such as Camarasaurus. This may have better allowed the various species of sauropods to exist without competition.

The flexibility of Diplodocus neck is debated but it should have been able to browse from low levels to about 4 metres (13 feet) when on all fours. However, studies have shown that the center of mass of Diplodocus was very close to the hip socket; this means that Diplodocus could rear up into a bipedal posture with relatively little effort. It also had the advantage of using its large tail as a 'prop' which would allow for a very stable tripodal posture. In a tripodal posture Diplodocus could potentially increase its feeding height up to about 11 m (36 ft).

Diplodocus (dark green) and various sauropods in a tripodal posture, with the white dots showing the approximate center of mass, as estimated in studies

The neck's range of movement would have also allowed the head to graze below the level of the body, leading some scientists to speculate on whether Diplodocus grazed on submerged water plants, from riverbanks. This concept of the feeding posture is supported by the relative lengths of front and hind limbs. Furthermore, its peg-like teeth may have been used for eating soft water plants. Matthew Cobley et al. (2013) disputed this, finding that large muscles and cartilage would have limited neck movements. They state that the feeding ranges for sauropods like Diplodocus were smaller than previously believed and the animals may have had to move their whole bodies around to better access areas where they could browse vegetation. As such, they might have spent more time foraging to meet their minimum energy needs. The conclusions of Cobley et al. were disputed in 2013 and 2014 by Mike Taylor, who analyzed the amount and positioning of intervertebral cartilage to determine the flexibility of the neck of Diplodocus and Apatosaurus. Taylor found that the neck of Diplodocus was very flexible, and that Cobley et al. was incorrect, in that flexibility as implied by bones is less than in reality.

In 2010, Whitlock et al. described a juvenile skull at the time referred to Diplodocus (CM 11255) that differed greatly from adult skulls of the same genus: its snout was not blunt, and the teeth were not confined to the front of the snout. These differences suggest that adults and juveniles were feeding differently. Such an ecological difference between adults and juveniles had not been previously observed in sauropodomorphs.

Dental microwear patterns of Diplodocus suggest that it partitioned its resources with Camarasaurus; the former ate softer foods than the latter. However, juvenile Camarasaurus had similar microwear to adult Diplodocus, suggesting that adult Diplodocus may have competed with juvenile Camarasaurus for food.

=== Reproduction and growth ===
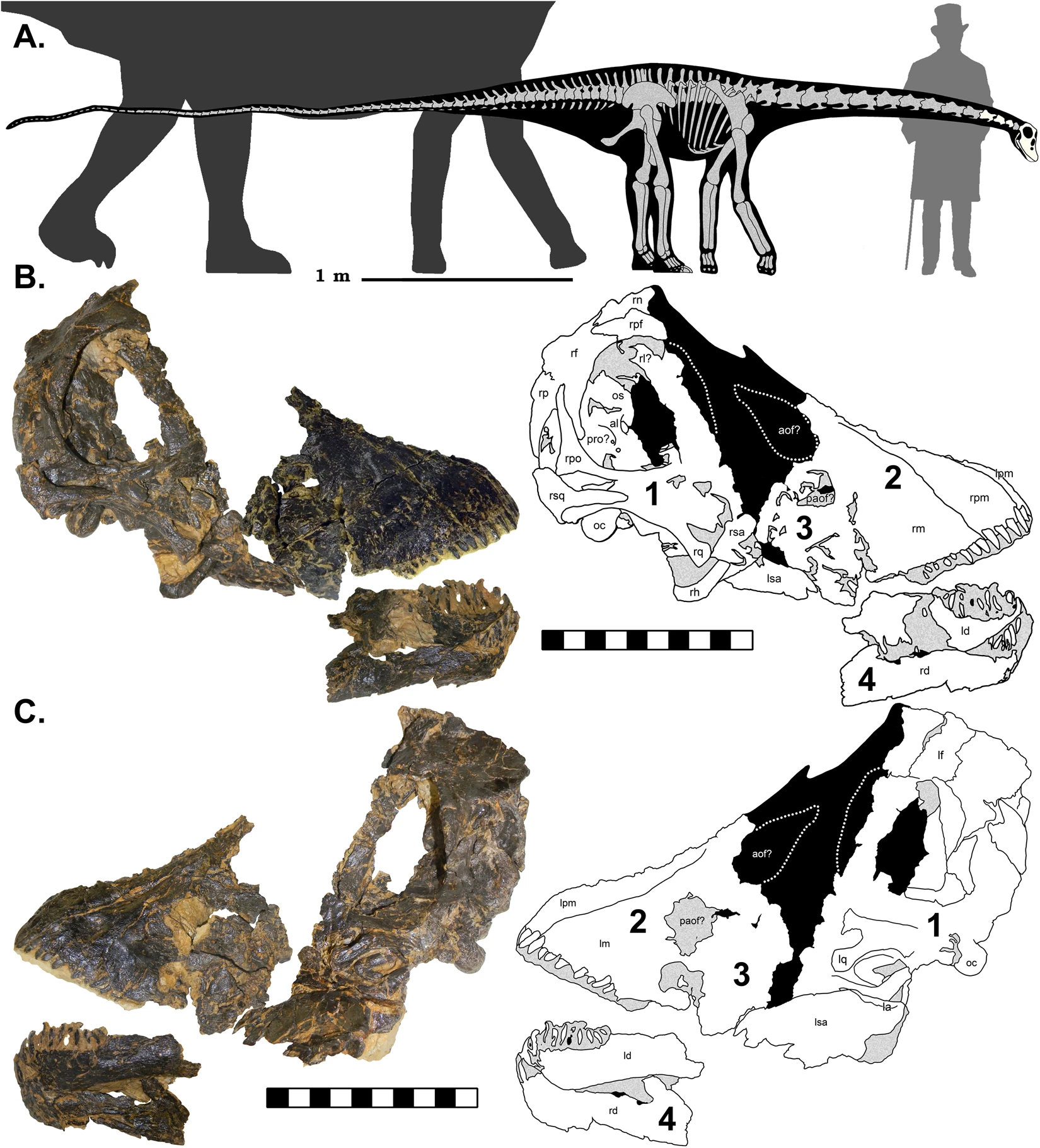
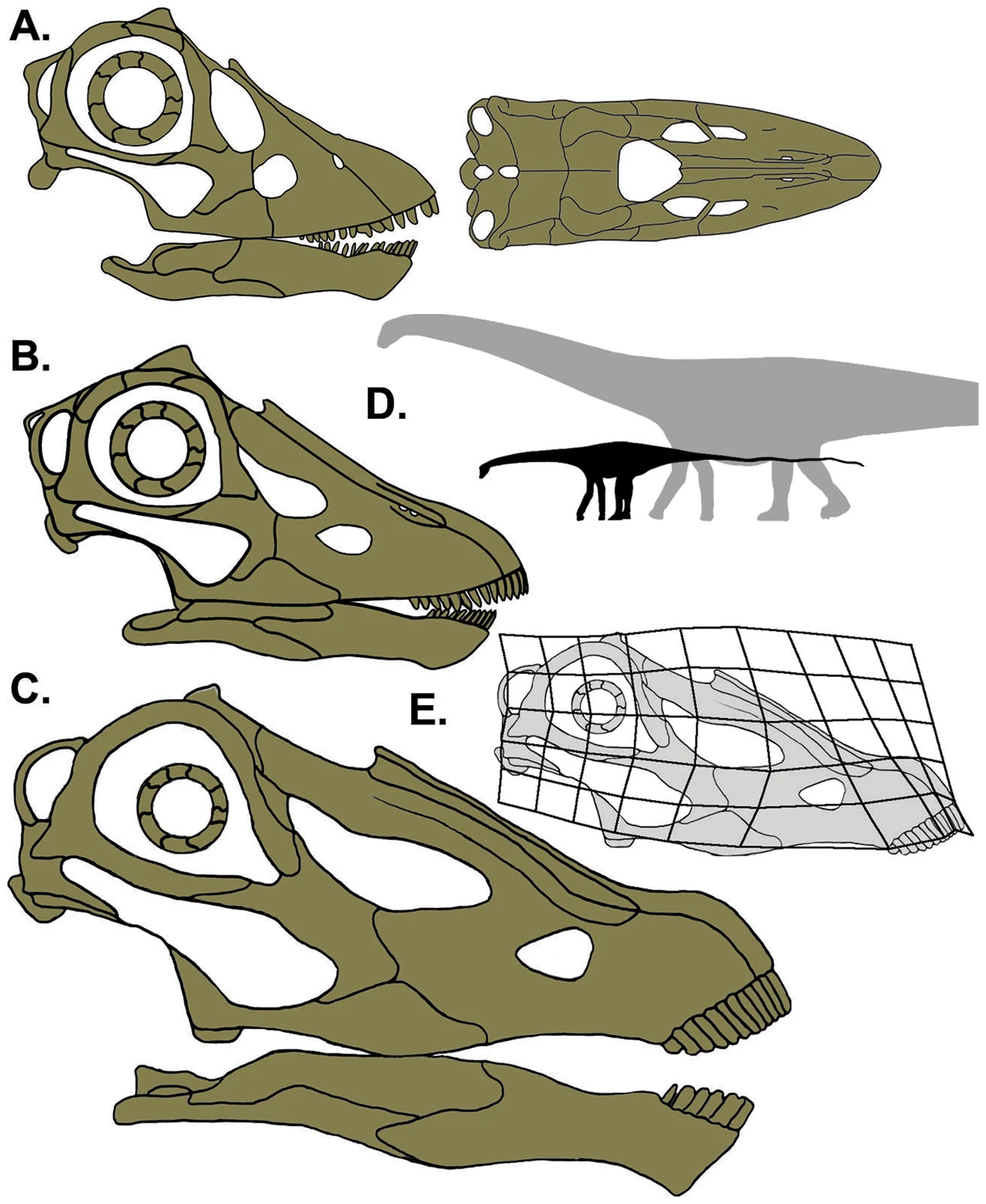
Diagrams and skull of juvenile specimen CMC VP14128 (left), and diagram showing cranial ontogeny

While the long neck has traditionally been interpreted as a feeding adaptation, it was also suggested that the oversized neck of Diplodocus and its relatives may have been primarily a sexual display, with any other feeding benefits coming second. A 2011 study refuted this idea in detail.

While no evidence indicates Diplodocus nesting habits, other sauropods, such as the titanosaurian Saltasaurus, have been associated with nesting sites. The titanosaurian nesting sites indicate that they may have laid their eggs communally over a large area in many shallow pits, each covered with vegetation. Diplodocus may have done the same. The documentary Walking with Dinosaurs portrayed a mother Diplodocus using an ovipositor to lay eggs, but it was pure speculation on the part of the documentary author. For Diplodocus and other sauropods, the size of clutches and individual eggs were surprisingly small for such large animals. This appears to have been an adaptation to predation pressures, as large eggs would require greater incubation time and thus would be at greater risk.

Based on bone histology studies in the early 2000s, it was suggested that Diplodocus and other sauropods grew at a very fast rate, reaching sexual maturity at just over a decade, and continuing to grow throughout their lives. However, a 2024 study estimated that the holotype of D. hallorum was around 60 years old in maximum age of death, over 20 years older than the oldest known sauropod specimens, and that it "had 'recently' reached skeletal maturity before death". This would make it one of the oldest known dinosaur specimens. The study also suggested that D. hallorum may have had a relatively slower and more prolonged rate of growth than D. carnegii, as the latter reached maturity within just 24 to 34 years of age.

== Paleoenvironment ==
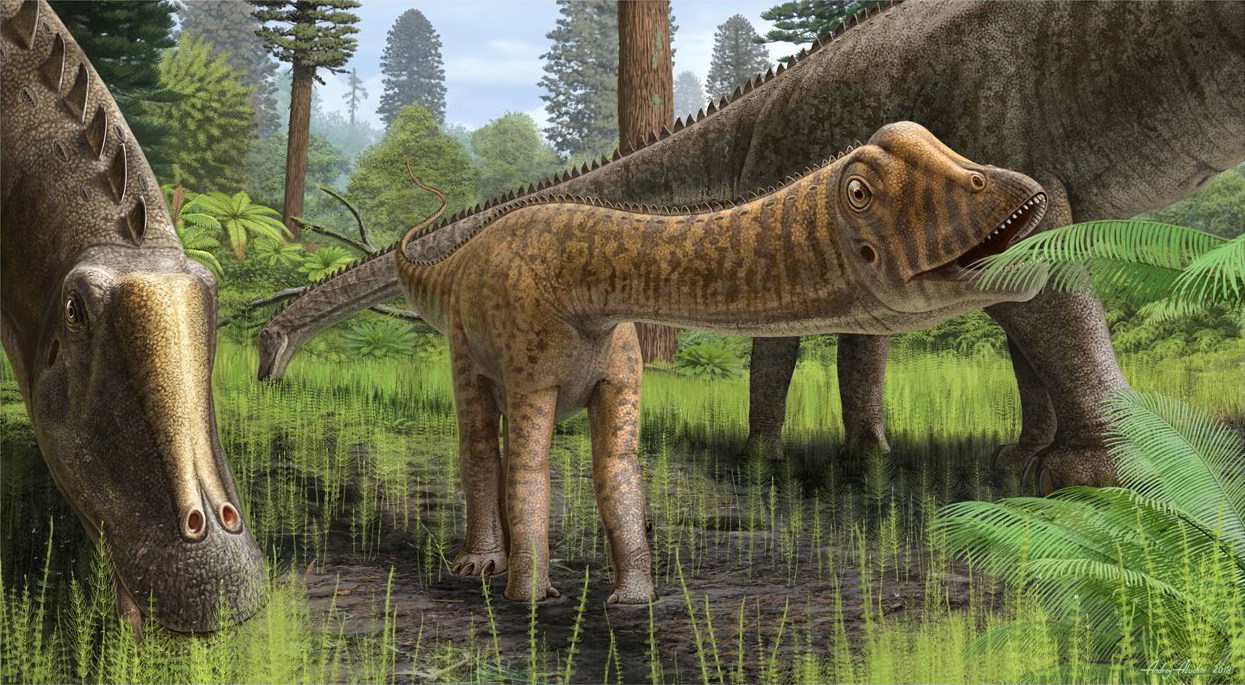
Restoration of a narrow snouted juvenile (based on specimen CMC VP14128) feeding alongside broad snouted adults

The Morrison Formation is a sequence of shallow marine and alluvial sediments which, according to radiometric dating, ranges between 156.3 million years old (Ma) at its base, and 146.8 million years old at the top, which places it in the late Oxfordian, Kimmeridgian, and early Tithonian ages of the Late Jurassic epoch. This formation is interpreted as a semi-arid environment with distinct wet and dry seasons. The Morrison Basin, where many dinosaurs lived, stretched from New Mexico to Alberta and Saskatchewan, and was formed when the precursors to the Front Range of the Rocky Mountains started pushing up to the west. The deposits from their east-facing drainage basins were carried by streams and rivers and deposited in swampy lowlands, lakes, river channels, and floodplains. This formation is similar in age to the Lourinha Formation in Portugal and the Tendaguru Formation in Tanzania.

Paleoenvironment and dinosaurs of the Morrison Formation, with Diplodocus group in the background

The Morrison Formation records an environment and time dominated by gigantic sauropod dinosaurs. Dinosaurs known from the Morrison include the theropods Ceratosaurus, Koparion, Stokesosaurus, Ornitholestes, Allosaurus and Torvosaurus, the sauropods Brontosaurus, Apatosaurus, Brachiosaurus, Camarasaurus, and the ornithischians Camptosaurus, Dryosaurus, Othnielia, Gargoyleosaurus and Stegosaurus. Diplodocus is commonly found at the same sites as Apatosaurus, Allosaurus, Camarasaurus, and Stegosaurus. Allosaurus accounted for 70 to 75% of theropod specimens and was at the top trophic level of the Morrison food web. Many of the dinosaurs of the Morrison Formation are the same genera as those seen in Portuguese rocks of the Lourinha Formation (mainly Allosaurus, Ceratosaurus, Torvosaurus, and Stegosaurus), or have a close counterpart (Brachiosaurus and Lusotitan; Camptosaurus and Draconyx). Other vertebrates that shared the same paleoenvironment included ray-finned fishes, frogs, salamanders, turtles like Dorsetochelys, sphenodonts, lizards, terrestrial and aquatic crocodylomorphs such as Hoplosuchus, and several species of pterosaur like Harpactognathus and Mesadactylus. Shells of bivalves and aquatic snails are also common. The flora of the period was green algae, fungi, mosses, horsetails, cycads, ginkgoes, and several families of conifers. Vegetation varied from river-lining forests of tree ferns and ferns (gallery forests), to fern savannas with occasional trees such as the Araucaria-like conifer Brachyphyllum.

== Cultural significance ==
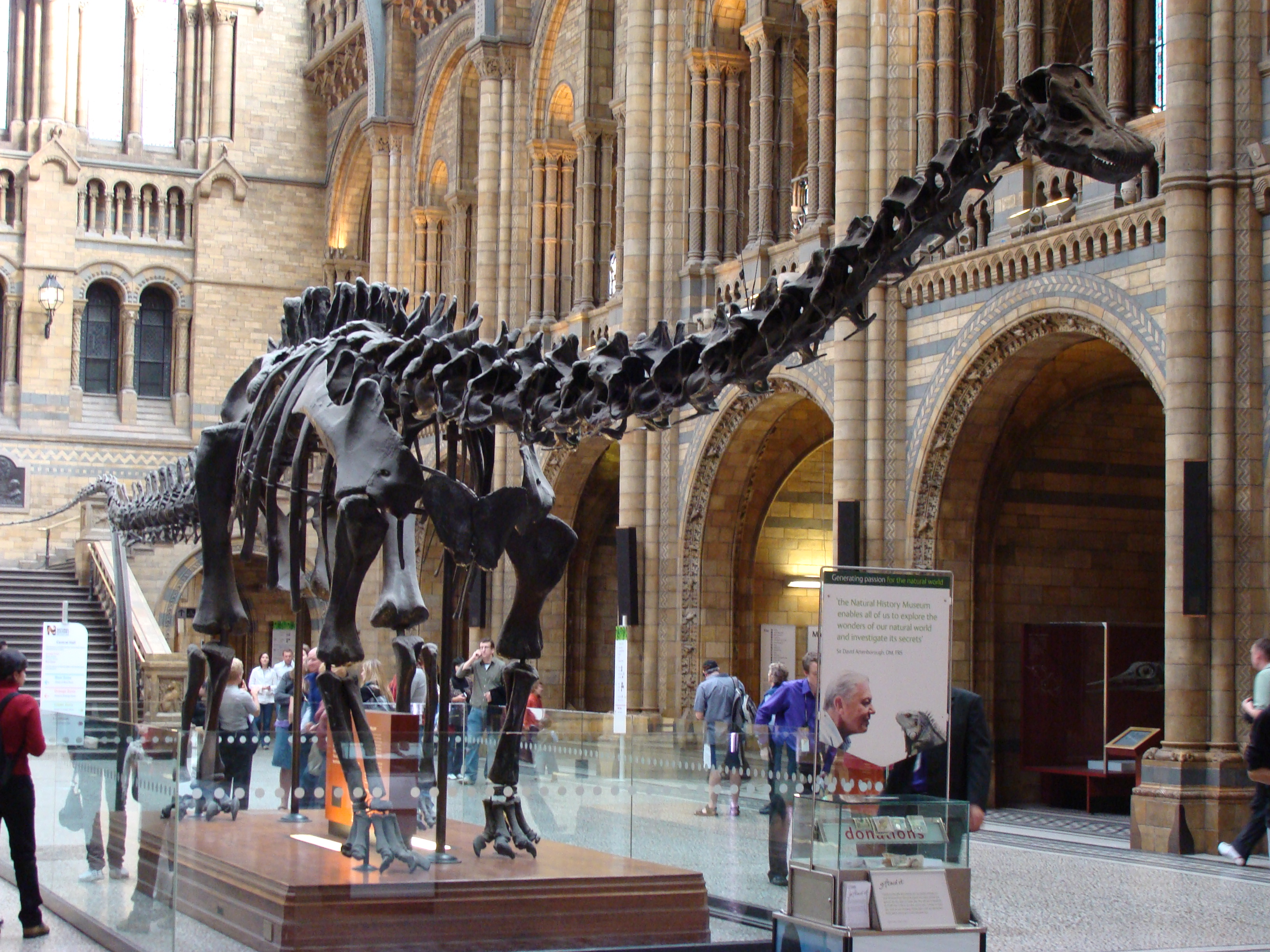
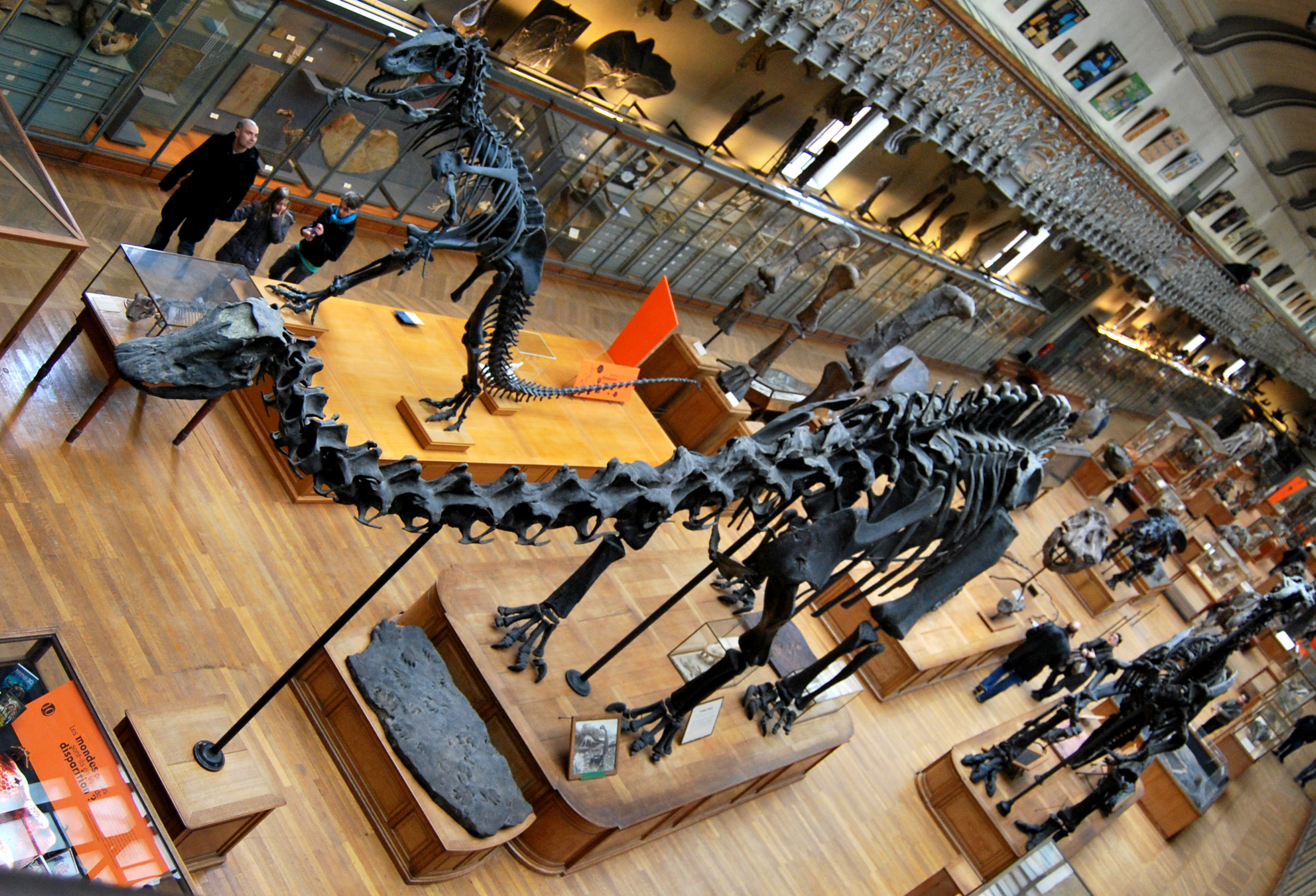
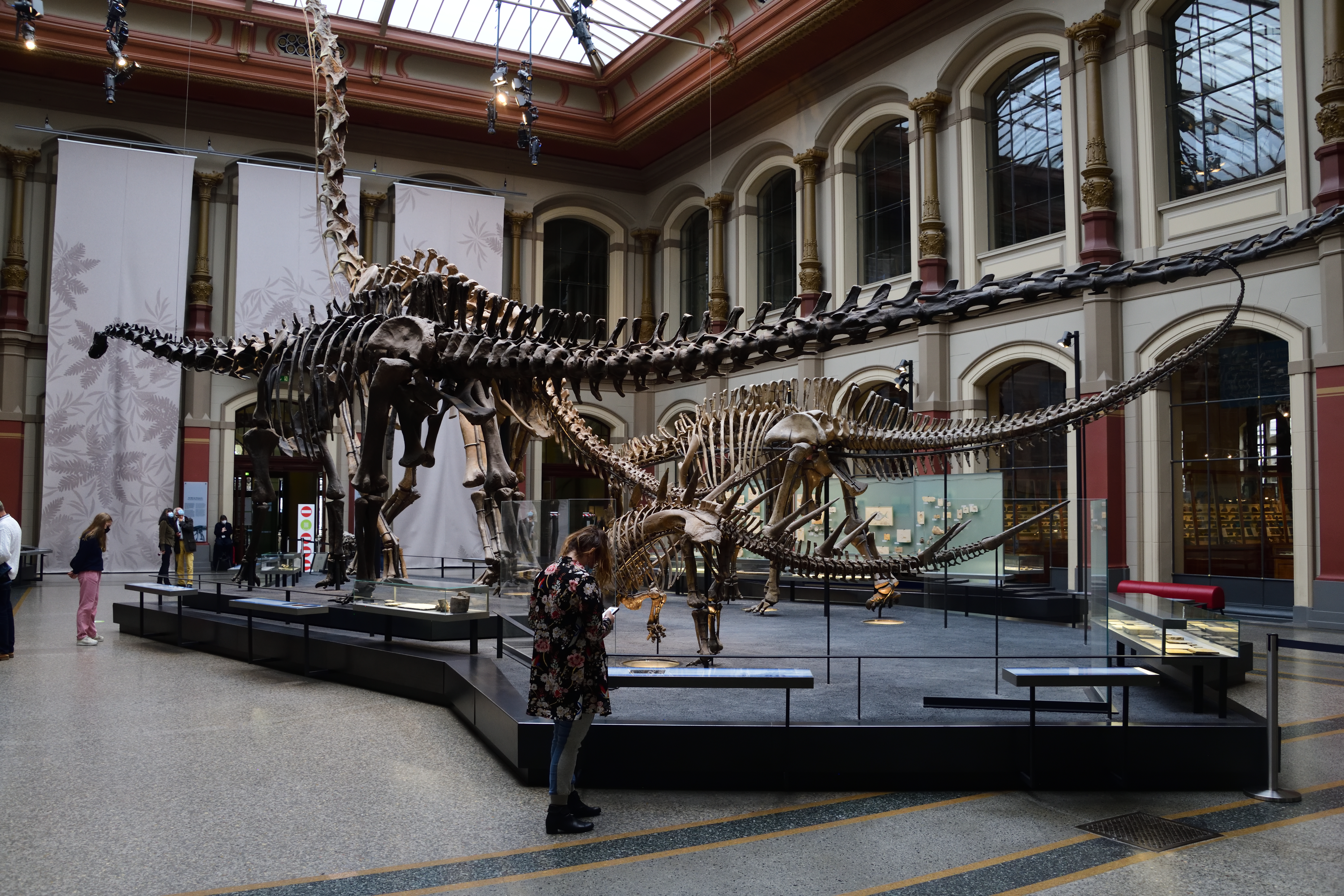
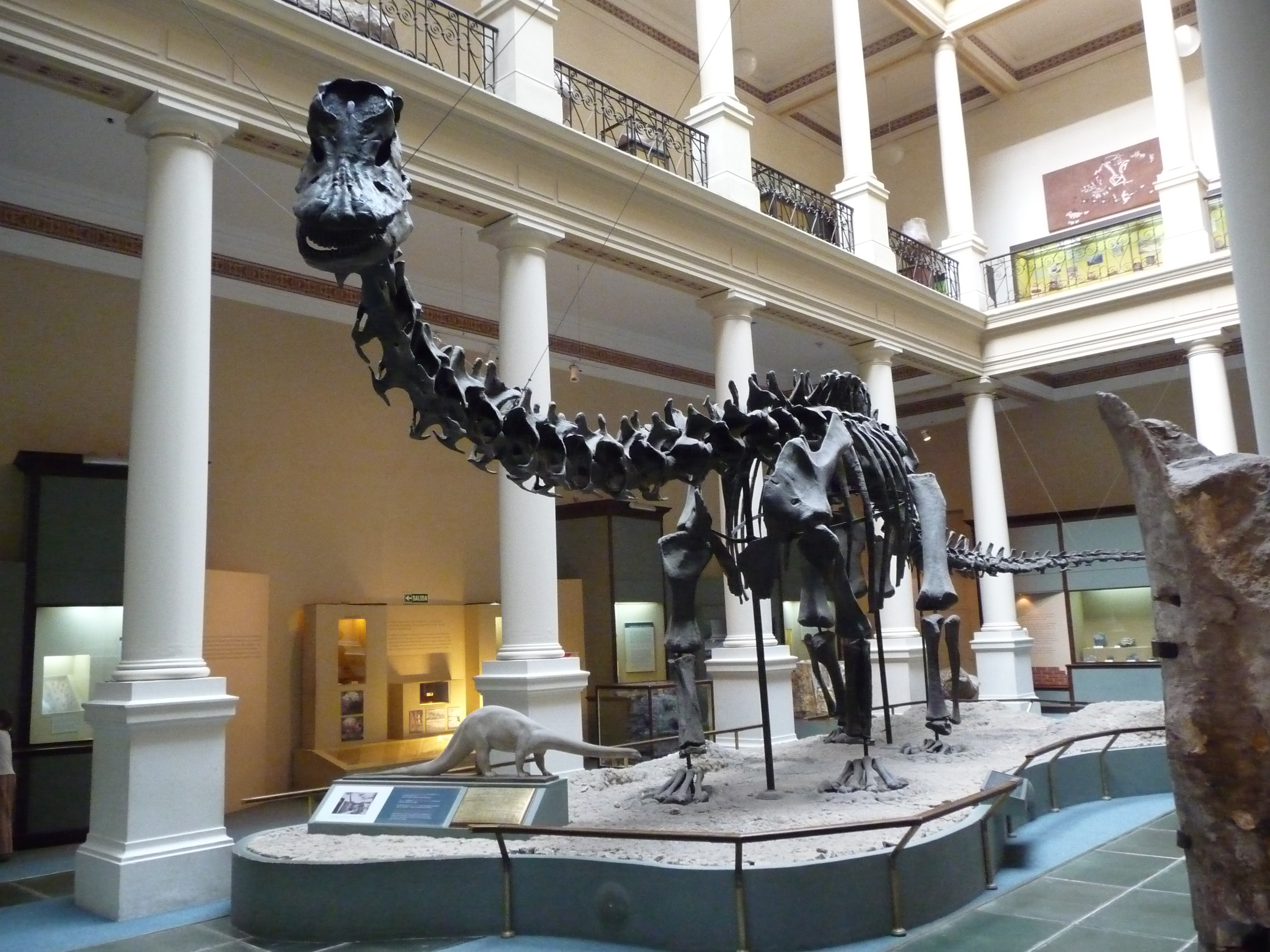
"Dippy", the first cast of D. carnegii at the Natural History Museum, London, and casts in the National Museum of Natural History, Paris, Museum für Naturkunde, Berlin, and Museo de La Plata

Diplodocus has been a frequently depicted dinosaur, being on display within more places than any other sauropod dinosaur. The frequency of Diplodocus depictions may be correlated to the large amounts of Diplodocus skeletal remains found, and Diplodocus‘ former status as the longest dinosaur discovered.

The donation of many mounted skeletal casts of "Dippy" by industrialist Andrew Carnegie to potentates around the world at the beginning of the 20th century did much to familiarize it to people worldwide. Casts of Diplodocus skeletons are still displayed in many museums worldwide, including D. carnegii in a number of institutions.

The project, along with its association with 'big science', philanthropism, and capitalism, drew much public attention in Europe. The German satirical weekly Kladderadatsch devoted a poem to the dinosaur:

Auch ein viel älterer Herr noch muß Den Wanderburschen spielen Er ist genannt Diplodocus und zählt zu den Fossilen Herr Carnegie verpackt ihn froh In riesengroße Archen Und schickt als Geschenk ihn so An mehrere Monarchen	But even a much older gent Sees itself forced to wander He goes by the name Diplodocus And belongs among the fossils Mr. Carnegie packs him joyfully Into giant arks And sends him as gift To several monarchs

"Le diplodocus" became a generic term for sauropods in French, much as "brontosaur" is in English.

D. longus is displayed the Senckenberg Museum in Frankfurt (a skeleton made up of several specimens, donated in 1907 by the American Museum of Natural History), Germany. A mounted and more complete skeleton of D. longus is at the Smithsonian National Museum of Natural History in Washington, DC, while a mounted skeleton of D. hallorum (formerly Seismosaurus), which may be the same as D. longus, can be found at the New Mexico Museum of Natural History and Science.

A war machine (landship) from World War I named Boirault machine was designed in 1915, later deemed impractical and hence given the nickname "Diplodocus militaris".
