= Suvendrini Perera =

Australian academic

Academic background
- Education: Columbia University

Academic work
- Discipline: Cultural studies
- Institutions: Curtin University

Suvendrini Perera is John Curtin Distinguished Emeritus Professor and Research Professor of Cultural Studies at Curtin University.

== Education and career ==
Perera completed her undergraduate education at the University of Sri Lanka and her PhD at Columbia University. She first taught at the City University of New York before moving to Australia and joining Curtin University.

== Selected works ==
- Reaches of Empire: The English Novel from Edgeworth to Dickens (Columbia University Press, 1991) ISBN 9780231075787
- Australia and the Insular Imagination: Beaches, Borders, Boats and Bodies (Palgrave Macmillan, 2009) ISBN 9780230613539
- Survival Media: The Politics and Poetics of Mobility and the War in Sri Lanka (Palgrave Macmillan, 2016) ISBN 9781137444639
