= Quaker lady =

Quaker lady may refer to:

- Quaker lady hosta (Hosta 'Quaker Lady')
- Quaker lady tall bearded iris (Iris 'Quaker Lady')
