= Quaker Hill, California =

Quaker Hill
- Former settlement
- Location in California
- Coordinates: 39°15′45″N 120°54′24″W
- Country: United States
- State: California
- County: Nevada County
- Elevation: 3,310 ft (1,009 m)

Quaker Hill is a former settlement in Nevada County, California. Quaker Hill is located 7.25 miles (11.7 km) south of North Bloomfield. It lay at an elevation of 3310 feet (1009 m). It still appeared on maps as of 1938.
