= Earthquake (disambiguation) =

An earthquake is the result of a sudden release of energy in the Earth's crust (the outer layer) that creates seismic waves.

Earthquake may also refer to:

== Film and TV ==
- Earthquake (1974 film), a 1974 American film starring Charlton Heston and Ava Gardner
- Earthquake (2016 film), a 2016 Armenian film
- "The Earthquake", a 1985 episode of the TV sitcom Gimme a Break!
- "Earthquake" (Modern Family), a 2010 Modern Family episode
- "Earthquake", a 1985 episode of the TV sitcom Night Court

== Music ==
- Earth Quake (band), an American power pop band
- Earthquake (album), a 1979 album by Electric Sun
- "Earthquake" (DJ Fresh and Diplo song), 2013
- "Earthquake" (Labrinth song), 2011
- "Earthquake" (Lil Wayne song), 2004
- "Earthquake" (Little Boots song), 2009
- "Earthquake" (Mýa song), 2011
- "Earthquake" (KSI song), a 2017 song by KSI featuring Ricegum
- "Earthquake" (Jisoo song), 2025
- "Earfquake", a song by Tyler, the Creator
- "Earthquake", a song by Family Force 5 from Business Up Front/Party in the Back
- "Earthquake", a song by Tech N9ne
- "Earthquake", a song by The Flirtations
- "Earthquake", a song by Deerhunter from Halcyon Digest
- "Earthquake", a song by Knuckle Puck from 20/20
- "Earthquake", a song by the Newsboys from Love Riot
- "Earthquake", a song by The Used from Lies for the Liars

== People ==
- Earthquake (comedian) (born 1963), American stand-up comedian
- Earthquake, a ringname of John Tenta, former Canadian sumo and professional wrestler (1963–2006)

== Sports and events ==
- Earthquake, an event in the television series Gladiators
- Earthquake: The Big One, a former attraction at Universal Studios Florida
- San Jose Earthquakes, an American professional soccer team

== Other ==
- Az-Zalzala ("The Earthquake"), the ninety-ninth sura of the Qur'an
- Earthquake (book), 2025 book by Australian journalist Niki Savva
- Earthquake (Samurai Shodown), a fictional character in the video game series Samurai Shodown
- Earthquake map in mathematics

== See also ==
- Continental drift
- Plate tectonics
- Richter magnitude scale
- Quake (disambiguation)
