= Smiling Sammy: Fox Trot =

"Smiling Sammy"
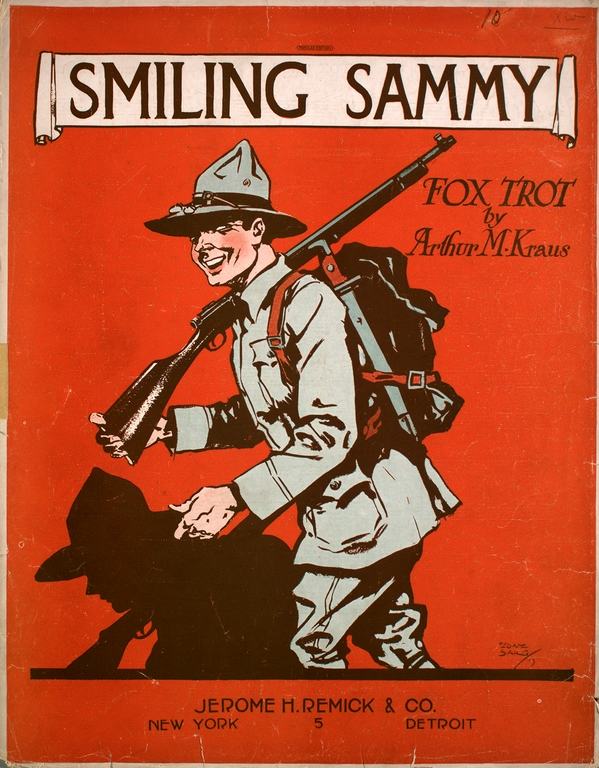
- sheet music cover of "Smiling Sammy"

Song
- Released: 1917
- Label: Jerome H. Remick & Co.
- Songwriter(s): Arthur M. Kraus

Smiling Sammy: Fox Trot is a World War I era song released in 1917. The music was written by Arthur M. Kraus. The song was published by Jerome H. Remick & Co. in Detroit, Michigan. On the cover of the sheet music, there is a soldier marching with a gun resting on his shoulder. The cover artist is Tony Sarg. The song was written for piano.

The sheet music can be found at Pritzker Military Museum & Library.
