= The First Circus =

1921 film

- Directed by: Tony Sarg
- Written by: Tony Sarg; Herbert M. Dawley
- Produced by: Herbert M. Dawley; Tony Sarg
- Edited by: Herbert M. Dawley
- Distributed by: Rialto Productions
- Release date: May 8, 1921
- Running time: 6 minutes
- Country: United States
- Language: Silent

The First Circus is a 1921 American short silent animated film, produced and directed by Tony Sarg and Herbert M. Dawley, featuring a pair of prehistoric circus performers balancing upon a brontosaurus. A print has been preserved in the US Library of Congress film archive.
