= Holly Woodward Ballard =

American paleontologist (born 1980)

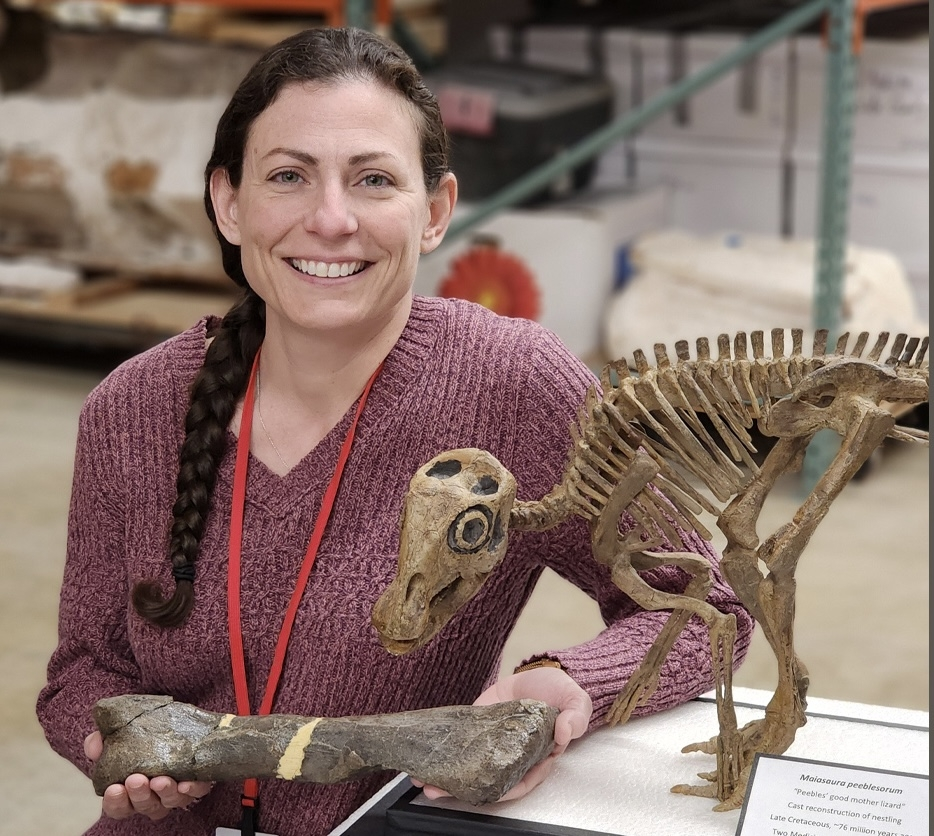
- Dr. Ballard in MOR
- Born: North Carolina, U.S.
- Education: North Carolina State University (B.Sc.); Texas Tech University (M.Sc.); Montana State University (Ph.D.)
- Known for: Paleohistology of T. rex
- Scientific career
- Fields: Vertebrate Paleontology and Paleohistology
- Workplaces: Oklahoma State University - Center for Health Sciences
- Thesis: Comparative population histovariability within the Archosauria (2012)
- Website: scholars.okstate.edu/en/persons/holly-ballard

Holly Woodward Ballard is an American paleontologist and paleohistologist.

== Biography ==
Ballard is a paleohistologist known for her research in the field of paleontology, particularly in the study of fossil bone tissue microstructures to understand the growth and development of extinct animals.

== Research ==
Ballard's research assesses ontogenetic growth and intra-specific variation in extinct tetrapods primarily through large-sample long-bone paleohistology, with a focus on non-avian dinosaurs. She also examines the intra-skeletal ontogenetic histology of extant tetrapods to improve understanding of bone tissue microstructures for use as a foundation in paleohistological interpretations.

== Publications ==
Ballard's notable publications include:

- Growing up Tyrannosaurus rex: Osteohistology refutes the pygmy "Nanotyrannus" and supports ontogenetic niche partitioning in juvenile Tyrannosaurus.
- Ruling Reptiles: Crocodylian Biology and Archosaur Paleobiology.
- The earliest Pleistocene record of a large-bodied hominin from the Levant supports two out-of-Africa dispersal events.
- Archosauromorpha: Avemetatarsalia – Dinosaurs and Their Relatives.
