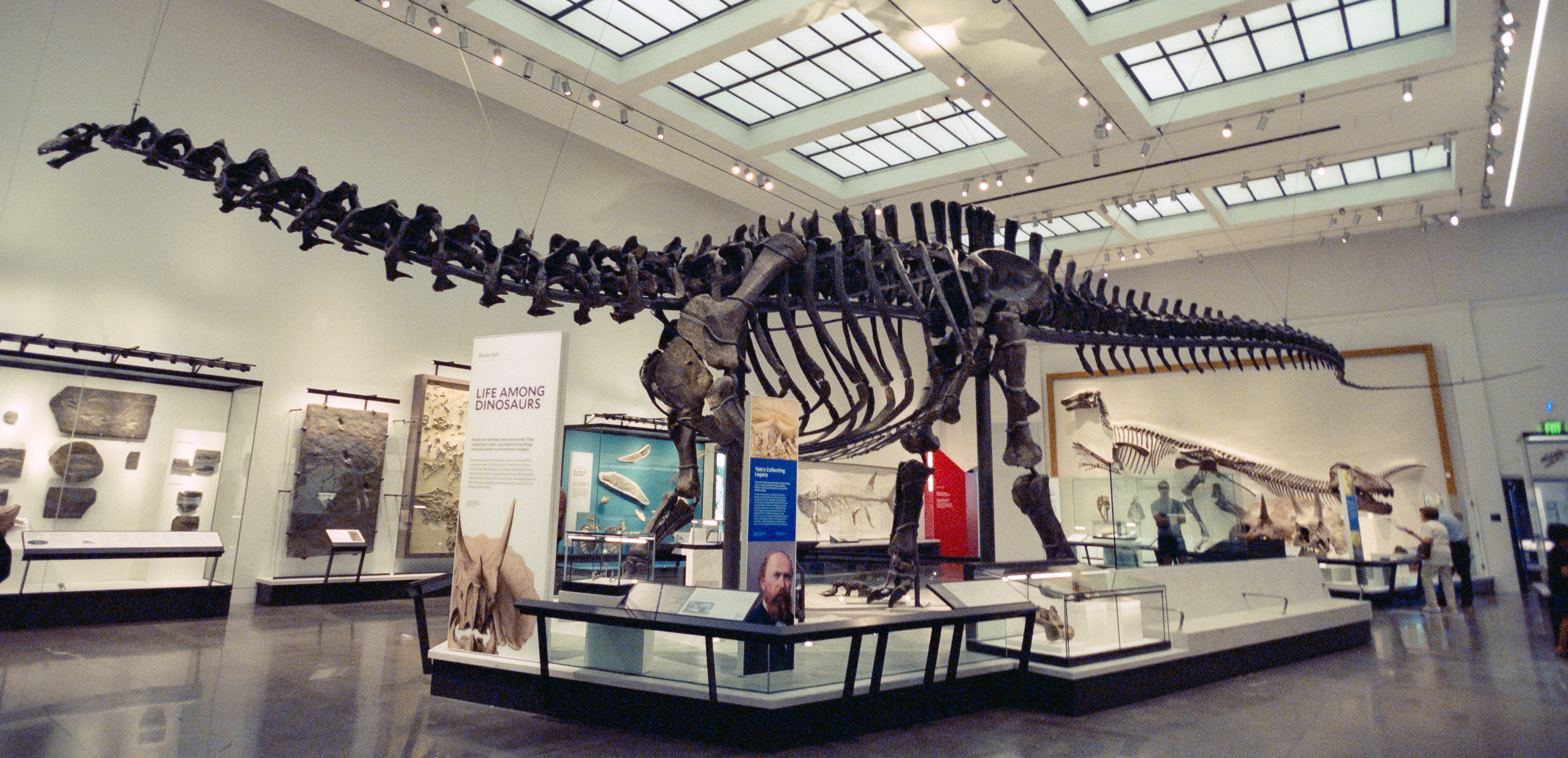
- Holotype specimen of B. excelsus (YPM 1980), Peabody Museum of Natural History, as remounted in 2020

Scientific classification
- Kingdom: Animalia
- Phylum: Chordata
- Class: Reptilia
- Clade: Dinosauria
- Clade: Saurischia
- Clade: †Sauropodomorpha
- Clade: †Sauropoda
- Clade: †Eusauropoda
- Superfamily: †Diplodocoidea
- Family: †Diplodocidae
- Subfamily: †Apatosaurinae
- Genus: †Brontosaurus; Marsh, 1879

Type species
- †Brontosaurus excelsus Marsh, 1879

Other species
- †Brontosaurus parvus (Peterson & Gilmore, 1902); †Brontosaurus yahnahpin (Filla & Redman, 1994)

Synonyms
- Elosaurus Peterson & Gilmore, 1902; Eobrontosaurus Bakker, 1998; Synonyms of B. excelsus: Brontosaurus amplus Marsh, 1881; Apatosaurus excelsus (Marsh, 1879) Riggs, 1903; Apatosaurus amplus (Marsh, 1881) Riggs, 1903; Atlantosaurus excelsus (Marsh, 1879) Steel, 1970; Atlantosaurus amplus (Marsh, 1881) Steel, 1970; Synonyms of B. parvus: Elosaurus parvus Peterson & Gilmore, 1902; Apatosaurus parvus (Peterson & Gilmore, 1902) Upchurch et al., 2004; Synonyms of B. yahnahpin: Apatosaurus yahnahpin Filla & Redman, 1994; Eobrontosaurus yahnahpin (Filla & Redman, 1994) Bakker, 1998

= Brontosaurus =

Brontosaurus Temporal range: Late Jurassic (Kimmeridgian to Tithonian), 156.3–146.8 Ma

Genus of diplodocid sauropod dinosaur

Brontosaurus (/ˌbrɒntəˈsɔːrəs/ BRON-tə-SOR-əs; literally 'thunder lizard', from the Greek words βροντή brontḗ, 'thunder', and σαῦρος saûros, 'lizard') is a genus of herbivorous sauropod dinosaur that lived in present-day United States during the Late Jurassic period. It was described by American paleontologist Othniel Charles Marsh in 1879, the type species being dubbed B. excelsus, based on a partial skeleton lacking a skull found in Como Bluff, Wyoming. In subsequent years, two more species of Brontosaurus were named: B. parvus in 1902 and B. yahnahpin in 1994. Brontosaurus lived about 156 to 146 million years ago (mya) during the Kimmeridgian and Tithonian ages in the Morrison Formation of what is now Utah and Wyoming. For decades, the animal was thought to have been a taxonomic synonym of its close relative Apatosaurus, but a 2015 study by Emmanuel Tschopp and colleagues found it to be distinct. It has seen widespread representation in popular culture, being the archetypal "long-necked" dinosaur in general media.

The anatomy of Brontosaurus is well known, with fossils demonstrating that it was large, long-necked, and quadrupedal with a long tail terminating in a whip-like structure. The cervical vertebrae are notably extremely robust and heavily built, in contrast to its lightly built relatives Diplodocus and Barosaurus. The forelimbs were short and stout whereas the hindlimbs were elongated and thick, supported respectively by a heavily built shoulder girdle and pelvis. Several size estimates have been made, with the largest species B. excelsus reaching up to 21–23 m (69–75 ft) from head to tail and weighing in at 15–20 t (17–22 short tons), whereas the smaller B. parvus only got up to 19 m (62 ft) long. Juvenile specimens of Brontosaurus are known, with younger individuals growing rapidly to adult size in as little as 15 years.

Brontosaurus has been classified within the family Diplodocidae, which was a group of sauropods that had shorter necks and longer tails compared to other families like brachiosaurs and mamenchisaurs. Diplodocids first evolved in the Middle Jurassic but peaked in diversity during the Late Jurassic with forms like Brontosaurus before becoming extinct in the Early Cretaceous. Brontosaurus is a genus in the subfamily Apatosaurinae, which includes only it and Apatosaurus, which are distinguished by their firm builds and thick necks. Although Apatosaurinae was named in 1929, the group was not used validly until an extensive 2015 paper, which found Brontosaurus to be valid. However, the status of Brontosaurus is still uncertain, with some paleontologists still considering it a synonym of Apatosaurus.

Being from the Morrison Formation, Brontosaurus coexisted with a menagerie of other taxa such as the sauropods Diplodocus, Barosaurus, and Brachiosaurus; herbivorous ornithischians Stegosaurus, Dryosaurus, and Camptosaurus; as well as the carnivorous theropods Allosaurus, Marshosaurus and Ceratosaurus. This formation was a hotspot of sauropod biodiversity, with over 16 recognized genera, which resulted in niche partitioning between different sauropods.

== History of discovery ==
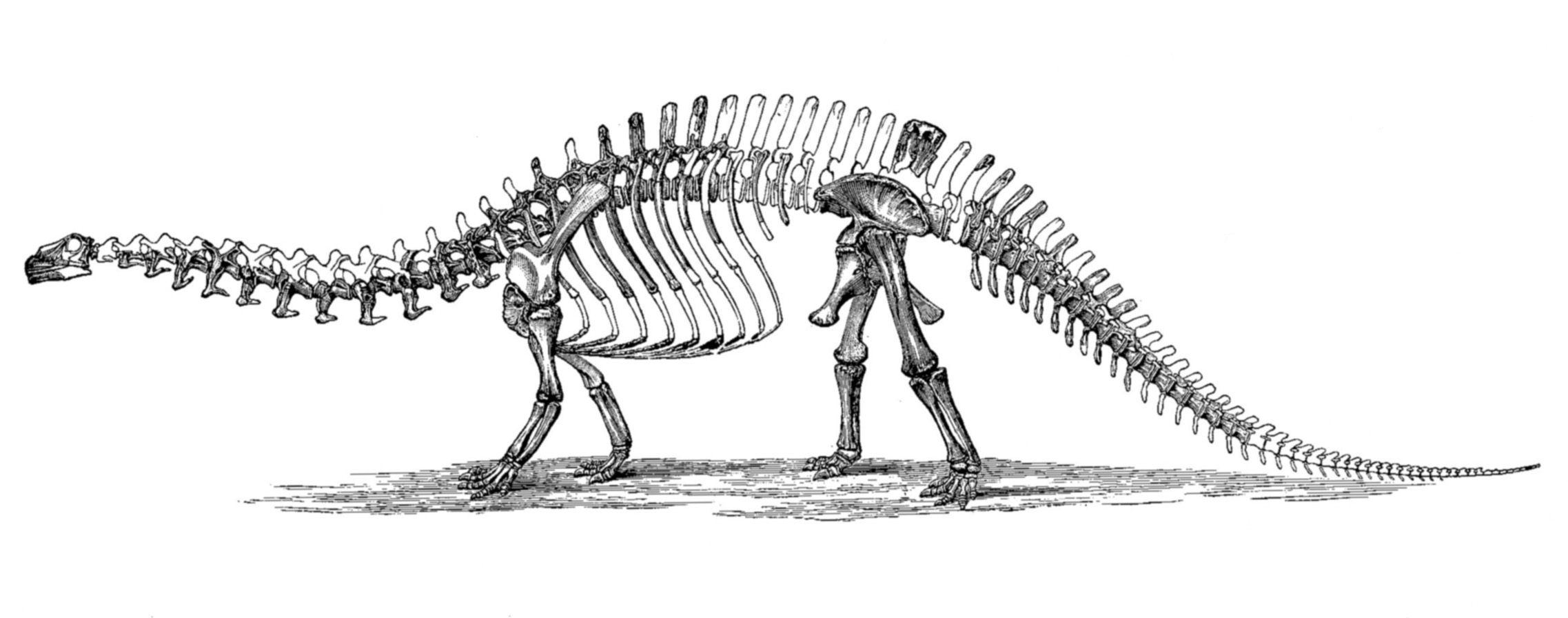
An 1896 diagram of the B. excelsus holotype skeleton by O.C. Marsh. The head is based on material now assigned to Brachiosaurus sp.

The discovery of a large and fairly complete sauropod skeleton was announced in 1879 by Othniel Charles Marsh, a professor of paleontology at Yale University. The specimen was collected from Morrison Formation rocks at Como Bluff, Wyoming by William Harlow Reed. He identified it as belonging to an entirely new genus and species, which he named Brontosaurus excelsus, meaning "thunder lizard", from the Greek brontē/βροντη meaning "thunder" and sauros/σαυρος meaning "lizard", and from the Latin excelsus, "noble" or "high". By this time, the Morrison Formation had become the center of the Bone Wars, a fossil-collecting rivalry between Marsh and another early paleontologist, Edward Drinker Cope. Because of this, the publications and descriptions of taxa by Marsh and Cope were rushed at the time. Brontosaurus excelsus' type specimen (YPM 1980) was one of the most complete sauropod skeletons known at the time, preserving many of the characteristic but fragile cervical vertebrae. Marsh believed that Brontosaurus was a member of the Atlantosauridae, a clade of sauropod dinosaurs he named in 1877 that also included Atlantosaurus and Apatosaurus. A year later in 1880, another partial postcranial Brontosaurus skeleton was collected near Como Bluff by Reed, including well-preserved limb elements. Marsh named this second skeleton Brontosaurus amplus ("large thunder lizard") in 1881, but it was considered a synonym of B. excelsus in 2015.

In August 1883, Marshall P. Felch collected a disarticulated partial skull (USNM V 5730) of a sauropod further south in the Felch Quarry at Garden Park, Colorado and sent the specimen to Yale. Marsh referred the skull to B. excelsus, later featuring it in a skeletal reconstruction of the B. excelsus type specimen in 1891 and the illustration was featured again in Marsh's landmark publication, The Dinosaurs of North America, in 1896. At the Yale Peabody Museum, the skeleton of Brontosaurus excelsus was mounted in 1931 with a skull based on the Marsh reconstruction of the Felch Quarry skull. While at the time most museums were using Camarasaurus casts for skulls, the Peabody Museum sculpted a completely different skull based on Marsh's recon. Marsh's skull was inaccurate for several other reasons: it included forward-pointing nasals, something truly different to any other dinosaur, and fenestrae differing from the drawing and other skulls. The mandible was based on that of a Camarasaurus. In 1998, the Felch Quarry skull that Marsh included in his 1896 skeletal restoration was suggested to belong to Brachiosaurus instead and this was supported in 2020 with a redescription of the brachiosaurid material found at the Felch Quarry.

=== Second Dinosaur Rush and skull issue ===
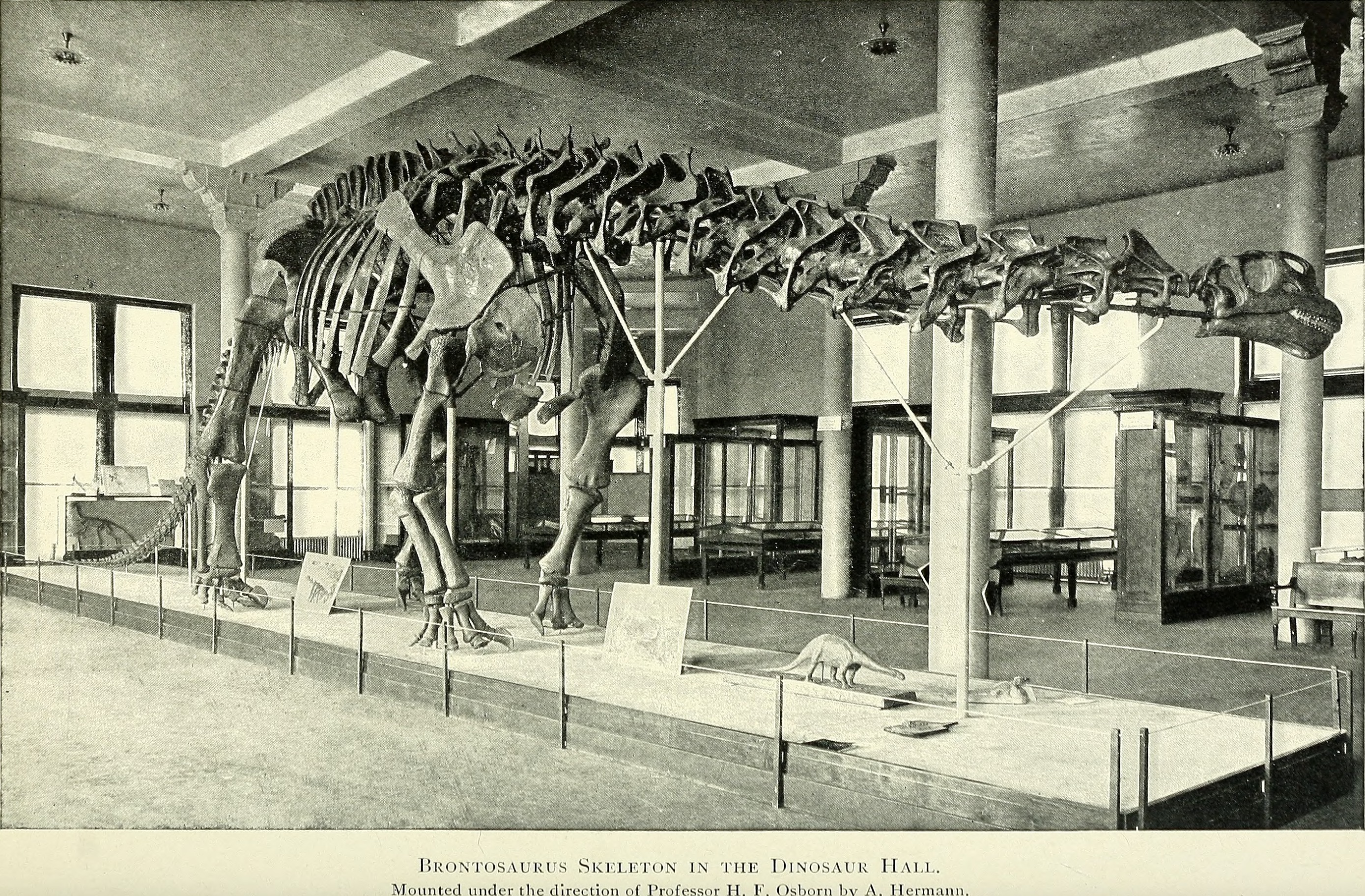
Obsolete mount of an apatosaurine referred to B. excelsus (specimen AMNH 460) with sculpted skull, completed in 1905, American Museum of Natural History

During a Carnegie Museum expedition to Wyoming in 1901, William Harlow Reed collected another Brontosaurus skeleton, a partial postcranial skeleton of a young juvenile (CM 566), including partial limbs. However, this individual was found intermingled with a fairly complete skeleton of an adult (UW 15556). The adult skeleton specifically was very well-preserved, bearing many cervical (neck) and caudal (tail) vertebrae, and is the most complete definite specimen of the species. The skeletons were granted a new genus and species name, Elosaurus parvus ("little field lizard"), by Olof A. Peterson and Charles Gilmore in 1902. Both of the specimens came from the Brushy Basin Member of the Morrison Formation. The species was later transferred to Apatosaurus by several authors. In 2008, a nearly complete postcranial skeleton of an apatosaurine was collected in Utah by crews working for Brigham Young University (BYU 1252-18531) where some of the remains are currently on display. The skeleton is undescribed, but many of the features of the skeleton are shared with A. parvus. The species was placed in Brontosaurus Tschopp et al. in 2015 during their comprehensive study of Diplodocidae.

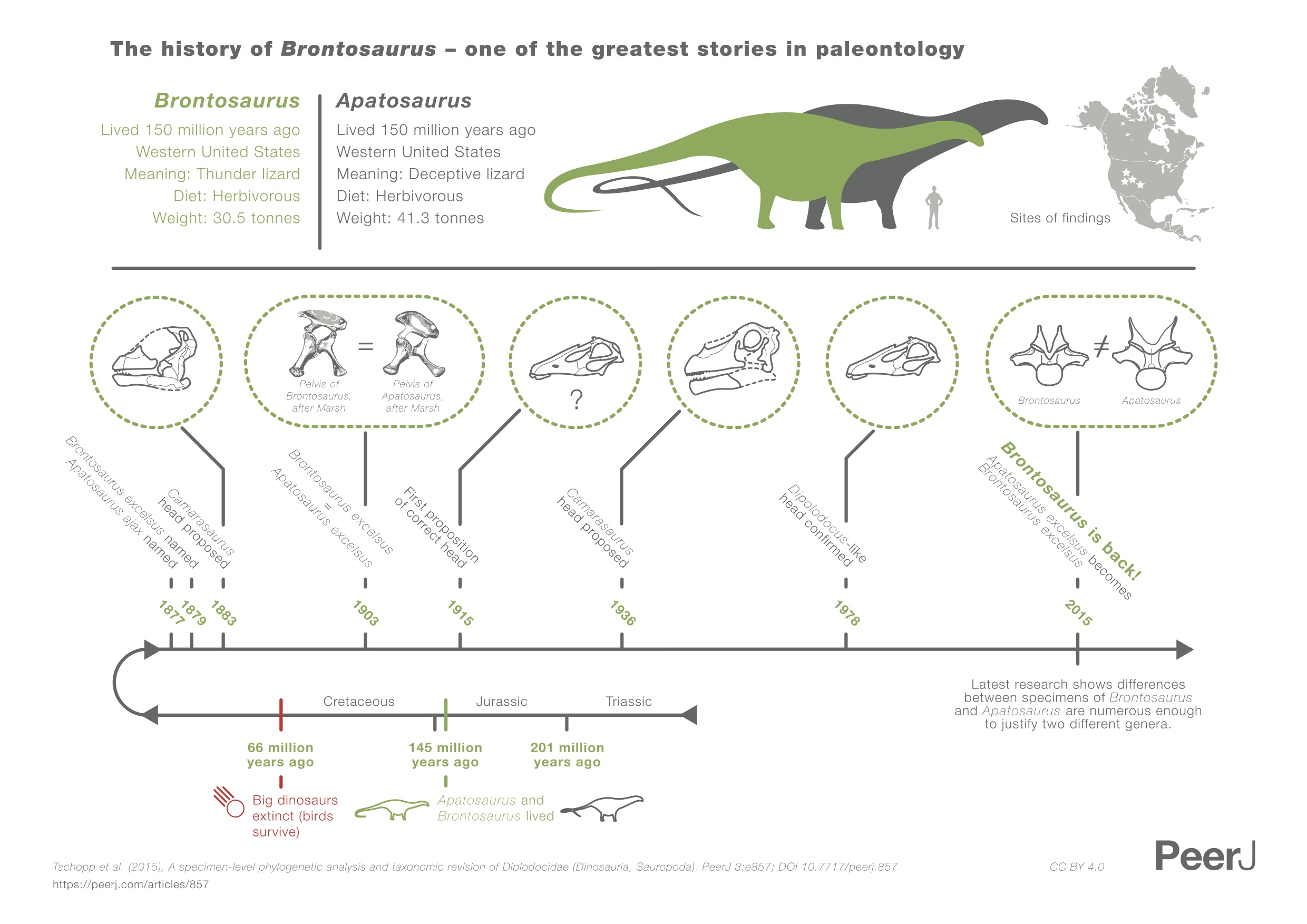
Infographic explaining the history of Brontosaurus and Apatosaurus according to Tschopp et al. 2015

In the 1903 edition of Geological Series of the Field Columbian Museum, Elmer Riggs argued that Brontosaurus was not different enough from Apatosaurus to warrant a separate genus, so he created the new combination Apatosaurus excelsus for it. Riggs stated that "In view of these facts the two genera may be regarded as synonymous. As the term 'Apatosaurus' has priority, 'Brontosaurus' will be regarded as a synonym". Nonetheless, before the mounting of the American Museum of Natural History specimen, Henry Fairfield Osborn chose to label the skeleton "Brontosaurus", though he was a strong opponent of Marsh and his taxa. In 1905, the American Museum of Natural History (AMNH) unveiled the first-ever mounted skeleton of a sauropod, a composite specimen (mainly made of bones from AMNH 460) that they referred to as Brontosaurus excelsus. The AMNH specimen was very complete, only missing the feet, added to the mount from the specimen AMNH 592, lower leg and shoulder bones, added from AMNH 222, and tail bones, added from AMNH 339. To finish the mount, the rest of the tail was fashioned to appear as Marsh believed it should, which meant it had too few vertebrae. In addition, a sculpted model of what the museum felt the skull of this massive creature might have looked like was placed on the skeleton. This was not a delicate skull like that of Diplodocus, which would later turn out to be more accurate, but was based on "the biggest, thickest, strongest skull bones, lower jaws, and tooth crowns from three different quarries". These skulls were likely those of Camarasaurus, the only other sauropod of which good skull material was known at the time. The mount construction was overseen by Adam Hermann, who failed to find Brontosaurus skulls. Hermann was forced to sculpt a stand-in skull by hand. Henry Fairfield Osborn noted in a publication that the skull was "largely conjectural and based on that of Morosaurus" (now Camarasaurus).

In 1909, an Apatosaurus skull was found, during the first expedition to what would become the Carnegie Quarry at Dinosaur National Monument, led by Earl Douglass. The skull was found a few meters away from a skeleton (specimen CM 3018) identified as the new species Apatosaurus louisae. The skull was designated CM 11162 and was very similar to the skull of Diplodocus. It was accepted as belonging to the Apatosaurus specimen by Douglass and Carnegie Museum director William J. Holland, although other scientists, most notably Osborn, rejected this identification. Holland defended his view in 1914 in an address to the Paleontological Society of America, yet he left the Carnegie Museum mount headless. While some thought Holland was attempting to avoid conflict with Osborn, others suspected that Holland was waiting until an articulated skull and neck were found to confirm the association of the skull and skeleton. After Holland's death in 1934, a cast of a Camarasaurus skull was placed on the mount by museum staff.

=== Skull correction, resurgent discoveries, and reassessment ===
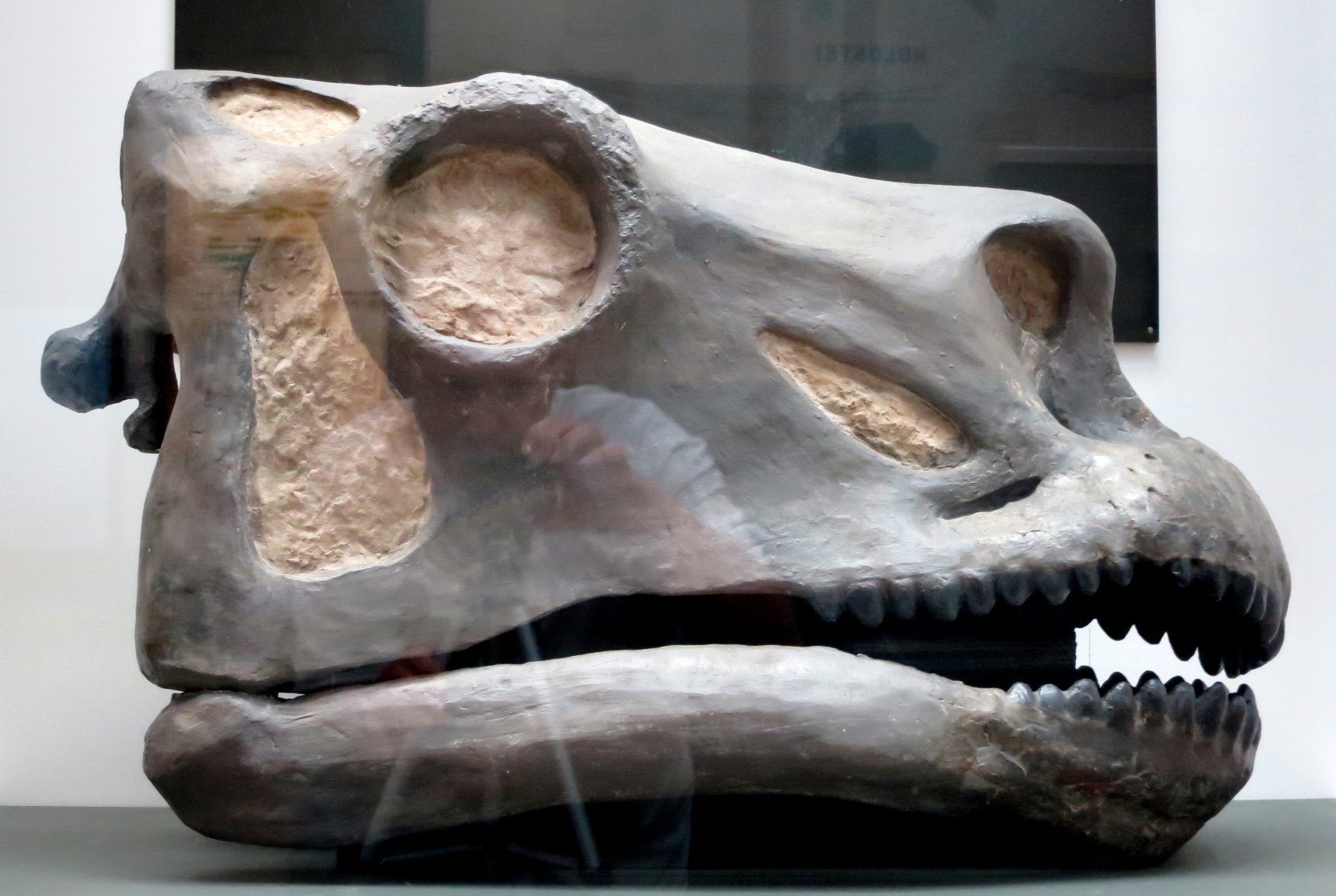
The sculpted "Brontosaurus" skull of the Yale Peabody Museum mount, which was based on fossils Camarasaurus and Brachiosaurus

No apatosaurine skull was mentioned in the literature until the 1970s when John Stanton McIntosh and David Berman redescribed the skulls of Diplodocus and Apatosaurus in 1975. They found that though he never published his opinion, Holland was almost certainly correct in that Apatosaurus and Brontosaurus had a Diplodocus-like skull. According to them, many skulls long thought to belong to Diplodocus might instead be those of Apatosaurus. They reassigned multiple skulls to Apatosaurus based on associated and closely associated vertebrae. Though they supported Holland, Apatosaurus was falsely theorized to possibly have possessed a Camarasaurus-like skull, based on a disarticulated Camarasaurus-like tooth found at the precise site where an Apatosaurus specimen was found years before. However, this tooth does not come from Apatosaurus. On October 20, 1979, after the publications by McIntosh and Berman, the first skull of an Apatosaurus was mounted on a skeleton in a museum, that of the Carnegie. In 1995, the American Museum of Natural History followed suit, and unveiled their remounted skeleton (now labelled Apatosaurus excelsus) with a corrected tail and a new skull cast from A. louisae. In 1998, Robert T. Bakker referred a skull and mandible of an apatosaurine from Como Bluff to Brontosaurus excelsus (TATE 099-01), though the skull is still undescribed. In 2011, the first specimen of Apatosaurus where a skull was found articulated with its cervical vertebrae was described. This specimen, CMC VP 7180, was found to differ in both skull and neck features from A. louisae, and the specimen was found to have a majority of features related to those of A. ajax.

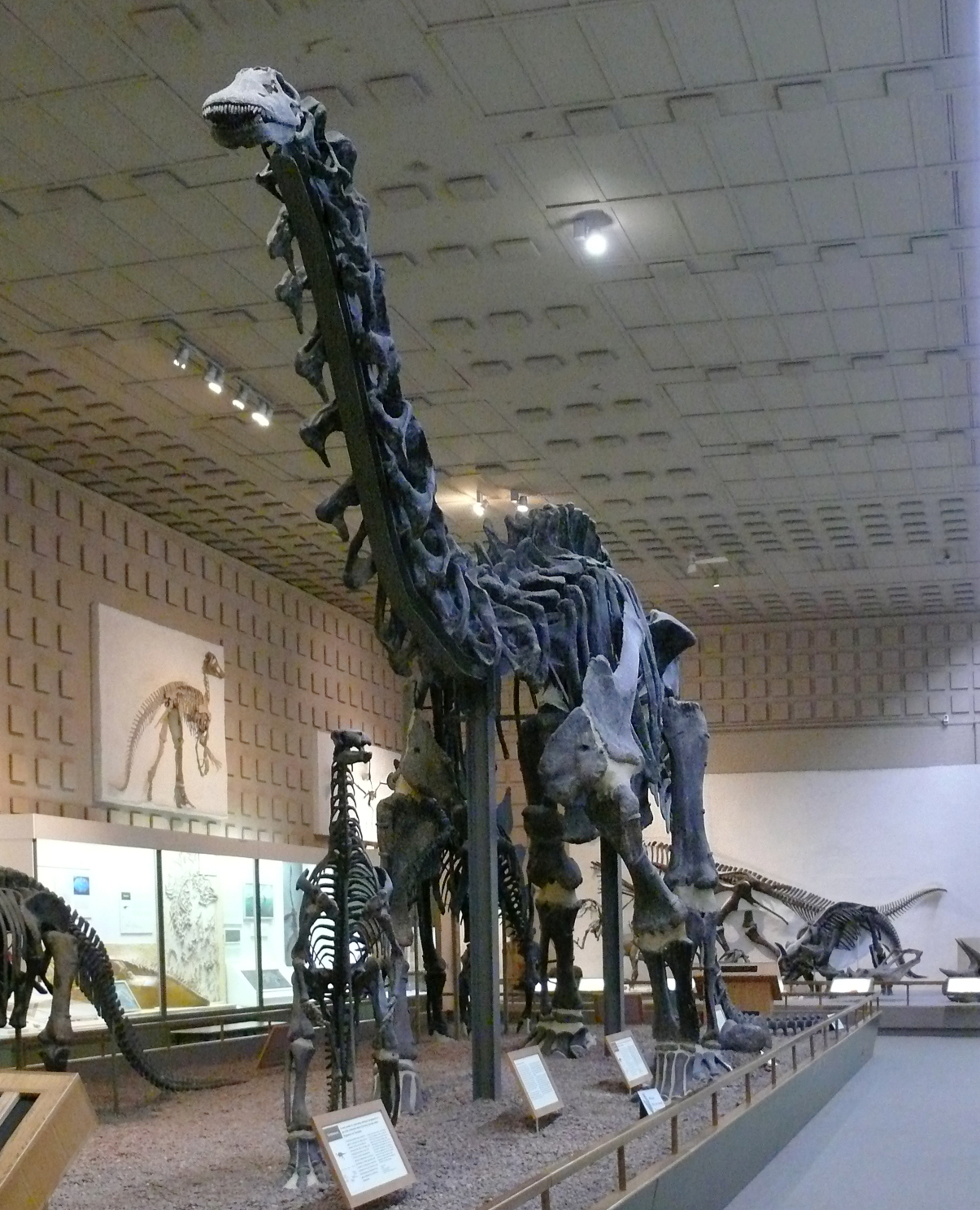
The Peabody Museum mount with new skull but in its original pose before its 2020 remounting

Another specimen of an Apatosaurine now referred to Brontosaurus was discovered in 1993 by the Tate Geological Museum, also from the Morrison Formation of central Wyoming. The specimen consisted of a partial postcranial skeleton, including a complete manus and multiple vertebrae, and was described by James Filla and Pat Redman a year later. Filla and Redman named the specimen Apatosaurus yahnahpin ("yahnahpin-wearing deceptive lizard"), but Robert T. Bakker gave it the genus name Eobrontosaurus in 1998. Bakker believed that Eobrontosaurus was the direct predecessor to Brontosaurus, although Tschopp et al.'s phylogenetic analysis placed B. yahnahpin as the basalmost species of Brontosaurus.

Almost all 20th-century paleontologists agreed with Riggs that all Apatosaurus and Brontosaurus species should be classified in a single genus. According to the rules of the ICZN, which governs the scientific names of animals, the name Apatosaurus, having been published first, had priority; Brontosaurus was considered a junior synonym and was therefore discarded from formal use. Despite this, at least one paleontologist—Robert T. Bakker—argued in the 1990s that A. ajax and A. excelsus are sufficiently distinct that the latter continues to merit a separate genus. In 2015, an extensive study of diplodocid relationships by Emanuel Tschopp, Octavio Mateus, and Roger Benson concluded that Brontosaurus was indeed a valid genus of sauropod distinct from Apatosaurus. The scientists developed a statistical method to more objectively assess differences between fossil genera and species and concluded that Brontosaurus could be "resurrected" as a valid name. They assigned two former Apatosaurus species, A. parvus, and A. yahnahpin, to Brontosaurus, as well as the type species B. excelsus. The publication was met with some criticism from other paleontologists, including Michael D'Emic, Donald Prothero, who criticized the mass media reaction to this study as superficial and premature, and many others below. Some paleontologists, such as John and ReBecca Foster, continue to consider Brontosaurus as a synonym of Apatosaurus.

== Description ==
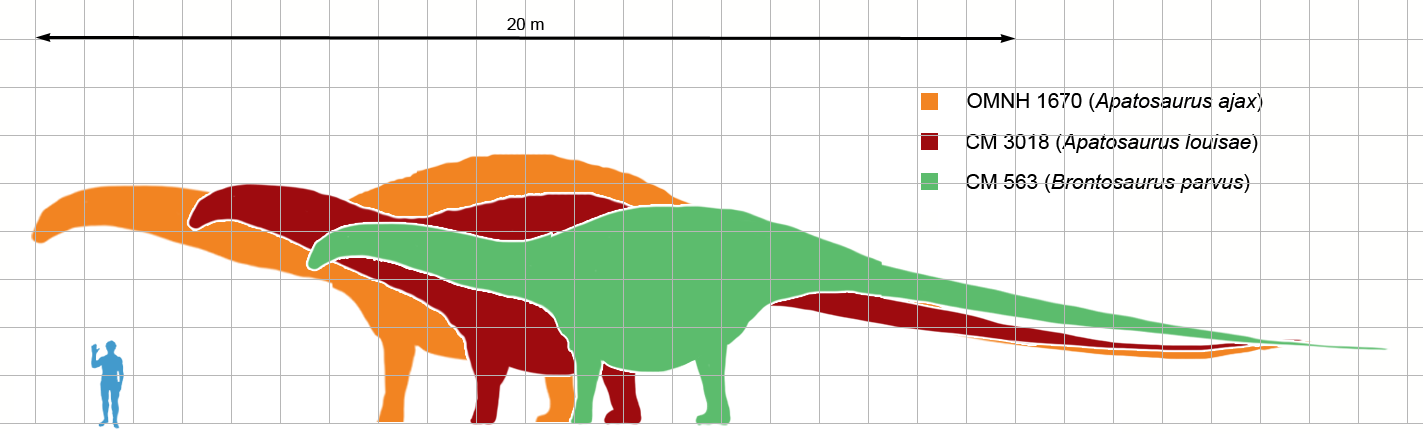
Comparison of three specimens and a human: Oklahoma specimen of Apatosaurus ajax (orange), A. louisae (red), and Brontosaurus parvus (green)

Brontosaurus was a large, long-necked, quadrupedal animal with a long, whip-like tail, and forelimbs that were slightly shorter than its hindlimbs. The largest species, B. excelsus, measured up to 21–23 m (69–75 ft) long from head to tail and weighed up to 15–20 t (17–22 short tons); other species were smaller, measuring 19 m (62 ft) long and weighing 14 t (15 short tons).

=== Skull and vertebrae ===
Although the skull of Brontosaurus has not been found, it was probably similar to the skull of the closely related Apatosaurus. Several skulls of Apatosaurus have been found, all of which are very small in proportion to the body. Their snouts were squared off and low, in contrast to those of macronarians. Jaws of Apatosaurus and other diplodocids were lined with spatulate (chisel-like) teeth which were adapted for herbivory.

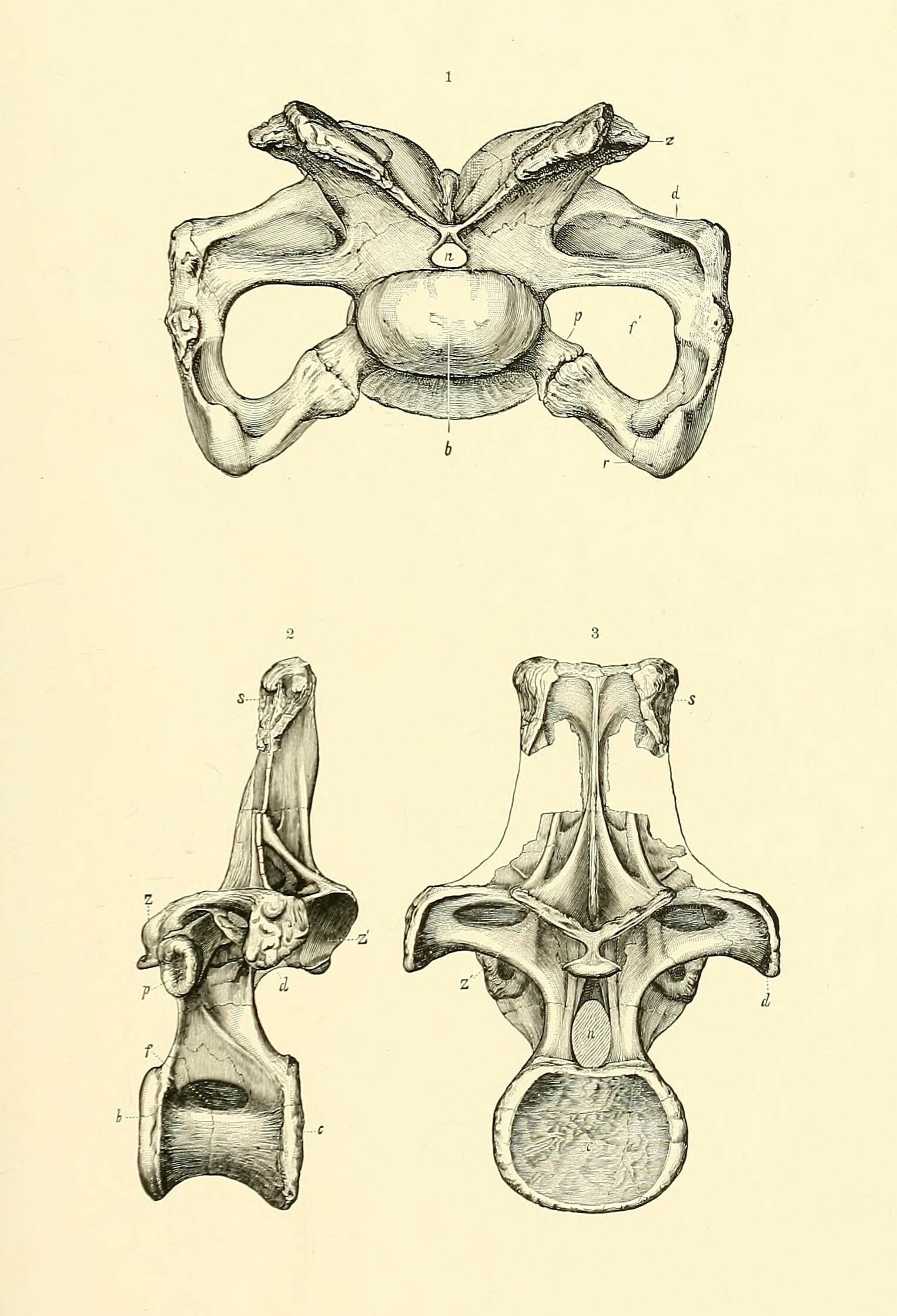
A cervical (top) and dorsal vertebra (bottom) of B. excelsus

Like those of other diplodocids, the vertebrae of the neck were deeply bifurcated on the dorsal side; that is, they carried paired spines, resulting in a wide and deep neck. The spine and tail consisted of 15 cervicals, ten dorsals, five sacrals, and about 82 caudals, based on Apatosaurus. The number of caudal vertebrae has been noted to vary, even within a species. Vertebrae in the neck, torso, and sacrum of sauropods bore large pneumatic foramina on their lateral sides. These are used to lighten the bones which aided in keeping the animal lighter. Within the vertebrae as well, smooth bone walls in addition to diverticula would make pockets of air to keep the bones light. Similar structures are observable in birds and large mammals. The cervical vertebrae were stouter than those of other diplodocids, as in Apatosaurus. On the lateral sides of the cervicals, apatosaurines had well-developed and thick parapophyses (extensions on the lateral sides of the vertebrae that attached to cervical ribs) which would point ventrally under the centrum. These parapophyses in conjunction with dense diapophyses and cervical ribs were strong anchors for neck muscles, which could sustain extreme force. The cervicals were also more boxy than in other sauropods due to their truncated zygapophyses and tall build. These vertebrae are triangular in anterior view, whereas they most often are rounded or square in genera like Camarasaurus. Despite its pneumaticy, the neck of Brontosaurus is thought to have been double the mass of that of other diplodocids due to the former's sturdiness. Brontosaurus differs from Apatosaurus in that the base of the posterior dorsal vertebrae's neural spines are longer than they are wide. The cervicals of species within Brontosaurus also vary, such as the lack of tubercules on the neural spines of B. excelsus and the lateral expansion of unbifurcated neural spines in B. parvus.

Its dorsal vertebrae had short centra with large fossae (shallow excavations) on their lateral sides, though not as extensively as the cervicals'. Neural canals, which contain the spinal cord of the vertebral column, are ovate and large in the dorsals. The diapophyses protrude outward and curve downward in a hook-shape. Neural spines are thick in anterior-posterior view with a bifurcate top. The neural spines of the dorsals would increase in height further towards the tail, creating an arched back. Apatosaurine neural spines compose more than half the height of the vertebrae. Medial surfaces of neural spines are gently rounded in B. yahnahpin, whereas in other B. spp. they are not. The dorsal ribs are not fused or tightly attached to their vertebrae, instead being loosely articulated. Ten dorsal ribs are on either side of the body. Expanded excavations within the sacrum are present making it into a hollow cylinder-shape. Sacral neural spines are fused together into a thin plate. The posteriormost caudal vertebra was lightly fused to the sacral vertebrae, becoming part of the plate. Internally, the neural canal was enlarged. The shape of the tail was typical of diplodocids, being comparatively slender, due to the vertebral spines rapidly decreasing in height the farther they are from the hips. As in other diplodocids, the last portion of the tail of Brontosaurus possessed a whip-like structure. The tail also bears an extensive air-sac system to lighten its weight, as observed in specimens of B. parvus.

=== Limbs ===
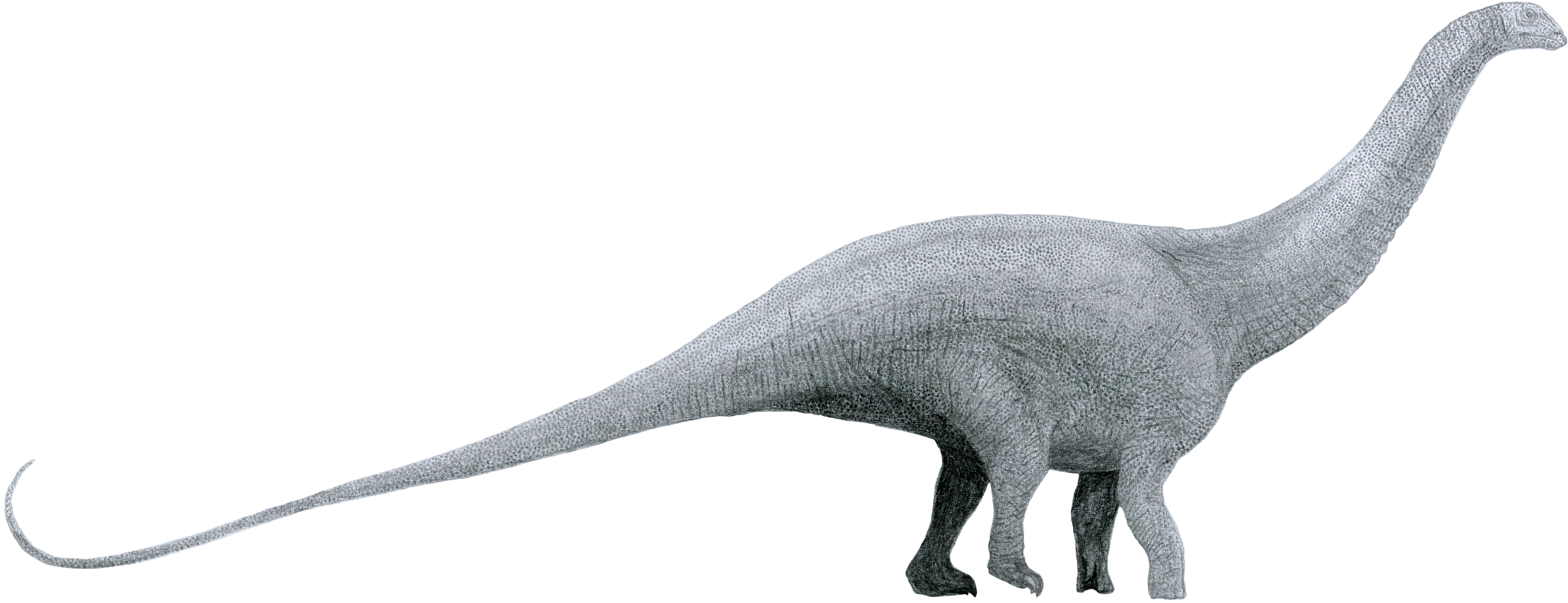
Restoration of B. excelsus

Several scapulae are known from Brontosaurus, all of which are long and thin with relatively elongated shafts. One of the traits that distinguishes Brontosaurus and Apatosaurus is the presence of a depression on the posterior face of the scapula, which the latter lacks. The scapula of Brontosaurus also has a rounded extension off of its edge, a characteristic unique to Brontosaurus among Apatosaurinae. The coracoid anatomy is closely akin to that of Apatosaurus, with a quadratic outline in dorsal view. Sterna have been preserved in some specimens of Brontosaurus, which display an oval outline. The hip bones include robust ilia and the fused pubes and ischia. The limb bones were also very robust, with the humerus resembling that of Camarasaurus, and those of B. excelsus being nearly identical to those of Apatosaurus ajax. The humerus had a thin bone shaft and larger transverse ends. Its anterior end bears a large deltopectoral crest, which was on the extremities of the bone.

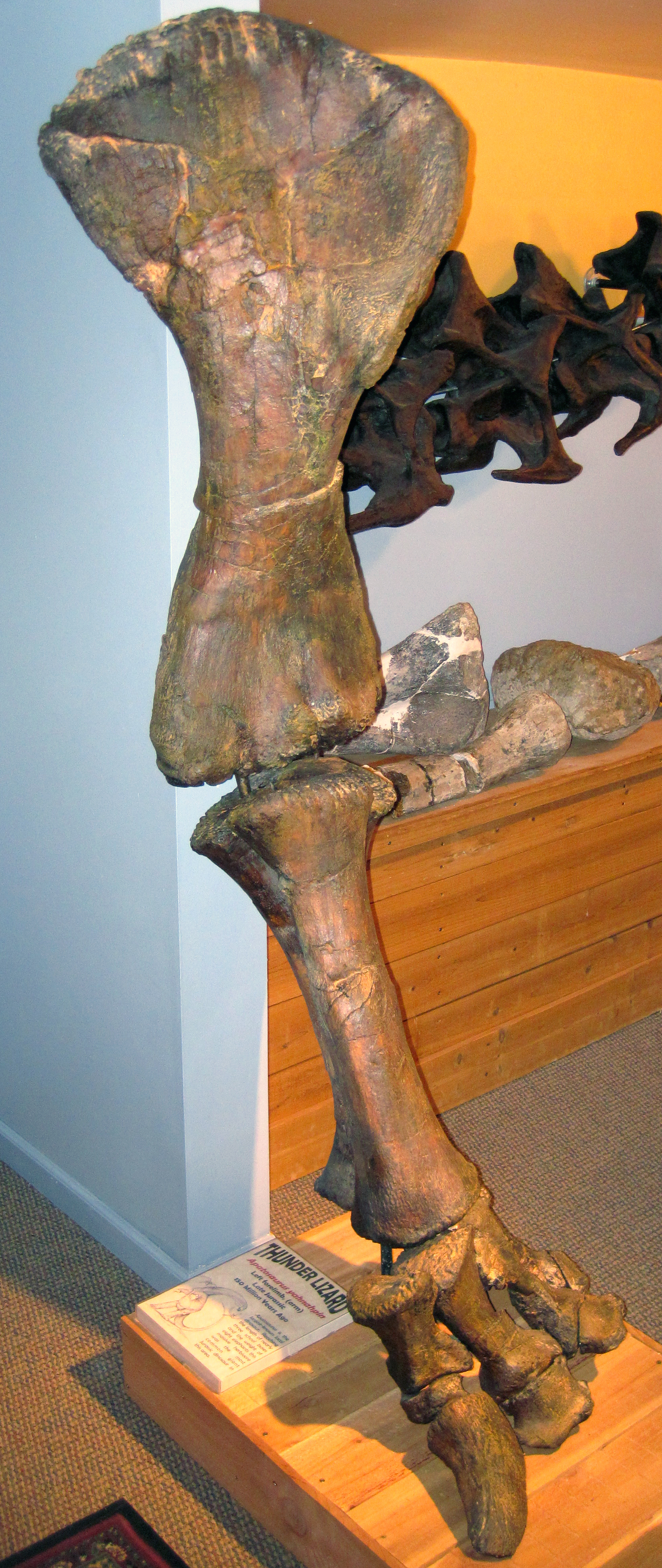
Left front limb of B. yahnahpin, Morrison Natural History Museum

Charles Gilmore in 1936 noted that previous reconstructions erroneously proposed that the radius and ulna could cross, when in life they would have remained parallel. Brontosaurus had a single large claw on each forelimb which faced towards the body, whereas the rest of the phalanges lacked unguals. Even by 1936, it was recognized that no sauropod had more than one hand claw preserved, and this one claw is now accepted as the maximum number throughout the entire group. The metacarpals are elongated and thinner than the phalanges, bearing boxy articular ends on its proximal and distal faces. The single front claw bone is slightly curved and squarely shortened on the front end. The phalangeal formula is 2-1-1-1-1, meaning the innermost finger (phalanx) on the forelimb has two bones and the next has one. The single manual claw bone (ungual) is slightly curved and squarely truncated on the anterior end. Proportions of the manus bones vary within Apatosaurinae as well, with B. yahnahpin's ratio of longest metacarpal to radius length around 0.40 or greater compared to a lower value in Apatosaurus louisae. The femora of Brontosaurus are very stout and represent some of the most robust femora of any member of Sauropoda. The tibia and fibula bones are different from the slender bones of Diplodocus but are nearly indistinguishable from those of Camarasaurus. The fibula is longer and slenderer than the tibia. The foot of Brontosaurus has three claws on the innermost digits; the digit formula is 3-4-5-3-2. The first metatarsal is the stoutest, a feature shared among diplodocids. B. excelsus's astragalus differs from other species in that it lacks a laterally directed ventral shelf.

== Classification ==
Brontosaurus is a member of the family Diplodocidae, a clade of gigantic sauropod dinosaurs. The family includes some of the longest and largest creatures ever to walk the earth, including Diplodocus, Supersaurus, and Barosaurus. Diplodocids first evolved during the Middle Jurassic in what is now Georgia, spreading to North America during the Late Jurassic. Brontosaurus is classified in the subfamily Apatosaurinae, which also includes Apatosaurus and possibly one or more unnamed genera. Othniel Charles Marsh described Brontosaurus as being allied to Atlantosaurus, within the now defunct group Atlantosauridae. In 1878, Marsh raised his family to the rank of suborder, including Apatosaurus, Brontosaurus, Atlantosaurus, Morosaurus (=Camarasaurus), and Diplodocus. He classified this group within Sauropoda. In 1903, Elmer S. Riggs mentioned that the name Sauropoda would be a junior synonym of earlier names, and grouped Apatosaurus within Opisthocoelia. Most authors still use Sauropoda as the group name.

Originally named by its discoverer Othniel Charles Marsh in 1879, Brontosaurus had long been considered a junior synonym of Apatosaurus; its type species, Brontosaurus excelsus, was reclassified as A. excelsus in 1903. However, an extensive study published in 2015 by a joint British-Portuguese research team concluded that Brontosaurus was a valid genus of sauropod distinct from Apatosaurus. Nevertheless, not all paleontologists agree with this division. The same study classified two additional species that had once been considered Apatosaurus and Eobrontosaurus as Brontosaurus parvus and Brontosaurus yahnahpin respectively.

Cladogram of the Diplodocidae after Tschopp, Mateus, and Benson (2015):

- Diplodocidae
  - Amphicoelias altus
  - - Apatosaurinae
      - Unnamed species
      - - - Apatosaurus ajax
          - Apatosaurus louisae
        - - Brontosaurus excelsus
          - - Brontosaurus yahnahpin
            - Brontosaurus parvus
    - Diplodocinae
      - Unnamed species
      - - Tornieria africana
        - - - Supersaurus lourinhanensis
            - Supersaurus vivianae
          - - Leinkupal laticauda
            - - Galeamopus hayi
              - - - Diplodocus carnegii
                  - Diplodocus hallorum
                - - Kaatedocus siberi
                  - Barosaurus lentus

=== Species ===
- Brontosaurus excelsus, the type species of Brontosaurus, was first named by Marsh in 1879. Many specimens have been assigned to the species, such as FMNH P25112, the skeleton mounted at the Field Museum of Natural History, which has since been found to represent an unknown species of apatosaurine. Brontosaurus amplus, is a junior synonym of B. excelsus. B. excelsus therefore only includes its type specimen and the type specimen of B. amplus. The largest of these specimens is estimated to have weighed up to 15 tonnes and measured up to 22 m (72 ft) long from head to tail. The known definitive B. excelsus fossils have been reported from Reed's Quarries 10 and 11 of the Morrison Formation Brushy Basin member in Albany County, Wyoming, dated to the late Kimmeridgian age, about 152 million years ago.
- Brontosaurus parvus, first described as Elosaurus in 1902 by Peterson and Gilmore, was reassigned to Apatosaurus in 1994, and to Brontosaurus in 2015. Specimens assigned to this species include the holotype, CM 566 (a partial skeleton of a juvenile found in Sheep Creek Quarry 4 in Albany County, WY), BYU 1252-18531 (a nearly complete skeleton found in Utah and mounted at Brigham Young University), and the partial skeleton UW 15556. It dates to the middle Kimmeridgian. Adult specimens are estimated to have weighed up to 14 tonnes and measured up to 22 m (72 ft) long from head to tail.
- Brontosaurus yahnahpin is the oldest species, known from a single site from the lower Morrison Formation, Bertha Quarry, in Albany County, Wyoming, dating to about 155 million years ago. It grew up to 21 m (69 ft) long. It was described by James Filla and Patrick Redman in 1994 as a species of Apatosaurus (A. yahnahpin). The specific name is derived from Lakota mah-koo yah-nah-pin, "breast necklace", a reference to the pairs of sternal ribs that resemble the hair pipes traditionally worn by the tribe. The holotype specimen is TATE-001, a relatively complete postcranial skeleton found in the lower Morrison Formation of Wyoming. More fragmentary remains have also been referred to the species. A re-evaluation by Robert T. Bakker in 1998 found it to be more primitive, so Bakker coined the new generic name Eobrontosaurus, derived from Greek eos, "dawn", and Brontosaurus.

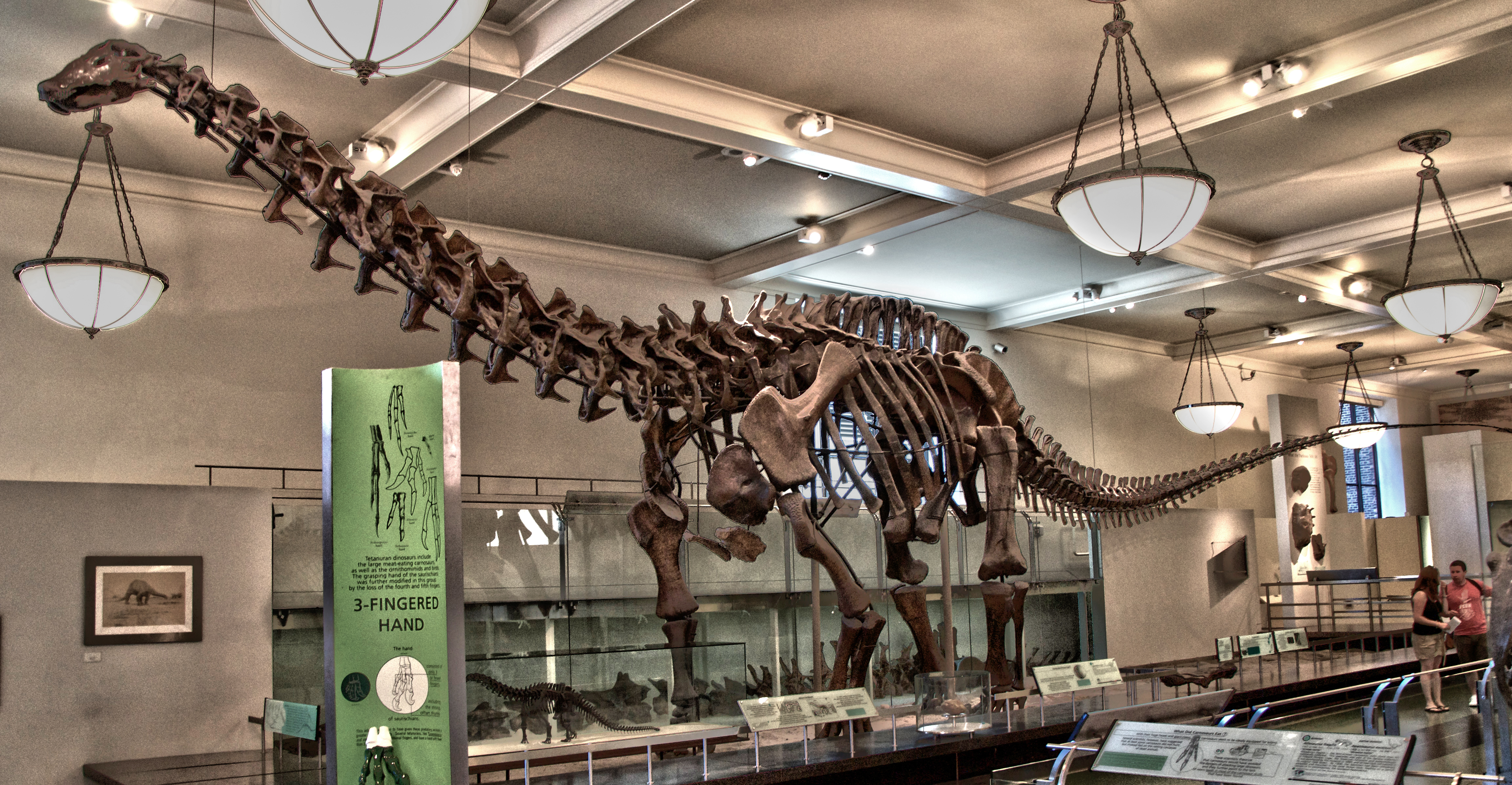
Skeleton of the AMNH apatosaurine (possibly B. excelsus, specimen AMNH 460) as remounted in 1995

The cladogram below is the result of an analysis by Tschopp, Mateus, and Benson (2015). The authors analyzed most diplodocid type specimens separately to deduce which specimen belonged to which species and genus.

- Apatosaurinae
  - - YPM 1840 ("Atlantosaurus" immanis type)
    - NSMT-PV 20375
  - - AMNH 460
    - - Apatosaurus
        - Apatosaurus ajax
          YPM 1860 (Apatosaurus ajax type)
        - Apatosaurus louisae
          - CM 3018 (Apatosaurus louisae type)
          - YPM 1861 (Apatosaurus laticollis type)
      - Brontosaurus
        - Brontosaurus excelsus
          - YPM 1980 (Brontosaurus excelsus type)
          - YPM 1981 (Brontosaurus amplus type)
        - - AMNH 5764 (Amphicoelias altus type)
          - - FMNH P25112
            - - Brontosaurus yahnahpin
                Tate-001 (Eobrontosaurus yahnahpin type)
              - Brontosaurus parvus
                - CM 566 (Elosaurus parvus type)
                - - UM 15556
                  - BYU 1252-18531

== Paleobiology ==
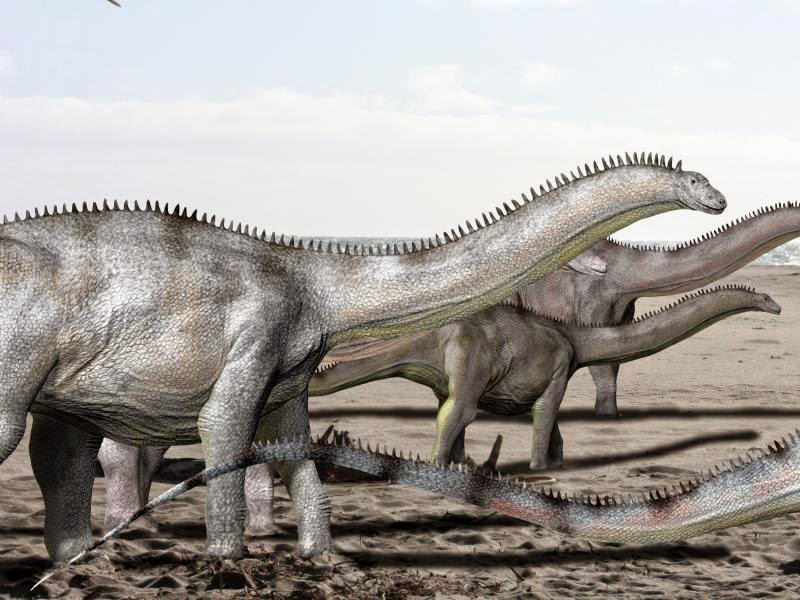
Restoration of a B. excelsus group

When Brontosaurus was described in 1879, the widespread notion in the scientific community was that sauropods were semi-aquatic, lethargic reptiles that were inactive. In Othniel Marsh's publication The Dinosaurs of North America, he described the dinosaur as "more or less amphibious, and its food was probably aquatic plants or other succulent vegetation". This is unsupported by fossil evidence. Instead, sauropods were active and had adaptations for dwelling on land. Marsh also noted the animal's supposed lack of intellect based on the small braincase of the Felch Quarry skull and slender neural cord. Recent research has found signs of intelligence in dinosaurs, akin to modern birds, though sauropods had relatively small brains.

Various uses for the single claw on the forelimb of sauropods have been proposed. One suggestion is that they were used for defense, but their shape and size make this unlikely. It was also possible they were for foraging, but the most probable use for the claw was grasping objects such as tree trunks when rearing.

Trackways of sauropods like Brontosaurus show that the average range for them was around 20–40 km (10–25 mi) per day, and they could potentially reach a top speed of 20–30 km/h (12–19 mph). The slow locomotion of sauropods may be due to the minimal muscling or recoil after strides. A possible bipedal trackway of a juvenile Apatosaurus is known, but it is disputed if it was possible for the sauropod.

=== Diet and energy requirements ===
Being a diplodocid sauropod, Brontosaurus was herbivorous and fed on ferns, cycadeoids, seed ferns, and horsetails, eating at ground height as a nonselective browser. The replacement method and physiology of Apatosaurus's teeth is unique, with the entire tooth row being replaced at once and up to 60% more often than Diplodocus. The teeth of Apatosaurus are thick, lack denticles, and are strongly cylindrical in cross-section whereas they are long, slender, and elliptical in cross-section in Diplodocus. These characteristics imply that Apatosaurus, and likely Brontosaurus, consumed tougher vegetation than Diplodocus. Diplodocids in general also have shorter necks than the long-necked, vertically inclined macronarians. This would result in niche partitioning, the various taxa thus avoiding direct competition with each other due to feeding on different plants and at different heights. Hypotheses of the food requirements of Brontosaurus have been made, though predicting this is difficult due to the lack of modern analogues. Endotherms (mammals) and ectotherms (reptiles) require a specific amount of nutrition to survive which correlates with their metabolism as well as body size. Estimations of the dietary necessities of Brontosaurus were made in 2010, with a guess of 2×10^{4} to 50×10^{4} kilojoules (5×10^{3} to 1×10^{5} kcal) needed daily. This led to hypotheses on the distributions of Brontosaurus to meet this requirement, though they varied on whether it was an ectotherm or endotherm. If Brontosaurus was an endotherm, fewer adult individuals could be sustained than if it were an ectotherm, which could have tens of animals per square kilometer. Due to this, it has been theorized that Brontosaurus and other sauropods living within the arid environment of the Morrison Formation participated in migrations between feeding sites. James Farlow (1987) calculates that a Brontosaurus-sized dinosaur about 35 t (34 long tons; 39 short tons) would have possessed 5.7 t (5.6 long tons; 6.3 short tons) of fermentation contents. Assuming Apatosaurus had an avian respiratory system and a reptilian resting-metabolism, Frank Paladino et al. (1997) estimate the animal would have needed to consume only about 262 liters (58 imp gal; 69 U.S. gal) of water per day.

=== Posture ===
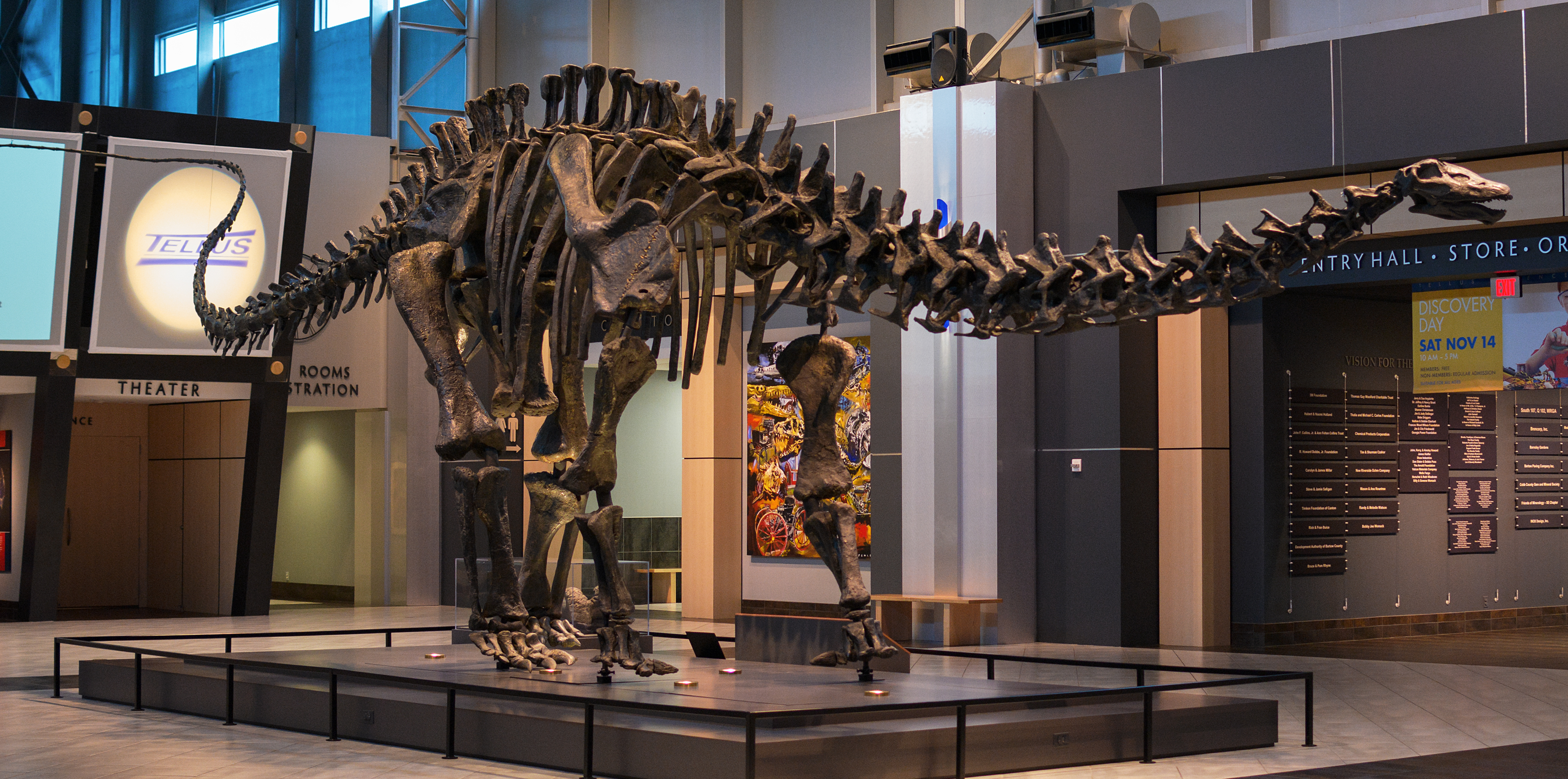
Cast of B. parvus specimen UWGM 15556 at Tellus Science Museum

Historically, sauropods like Brontosaurus were believed to have been too massive to support their weight on dry land, so theoretically, they must have lived partly submerged in water, perhaps in swamps. Recent findings do not support this, and sauropods are thought to have been fully terrestrial animals. Diplodocids like Brontosaurus are often portrayed with their necks held high up in the air, allowing them to browse on tall trees. Though some studies have suggested that diplodocid necks were less flexible than previously believed, other studies have found that all tetrapods appear to hold their necks at the maximum possible vertical extension when in a normal, alert posture, and argue that the same would hold true for sauropods barring any unknown, unique characteristics that set the soft tissue anatomy of their necks apart from that of other animals.

=== Physiology ===
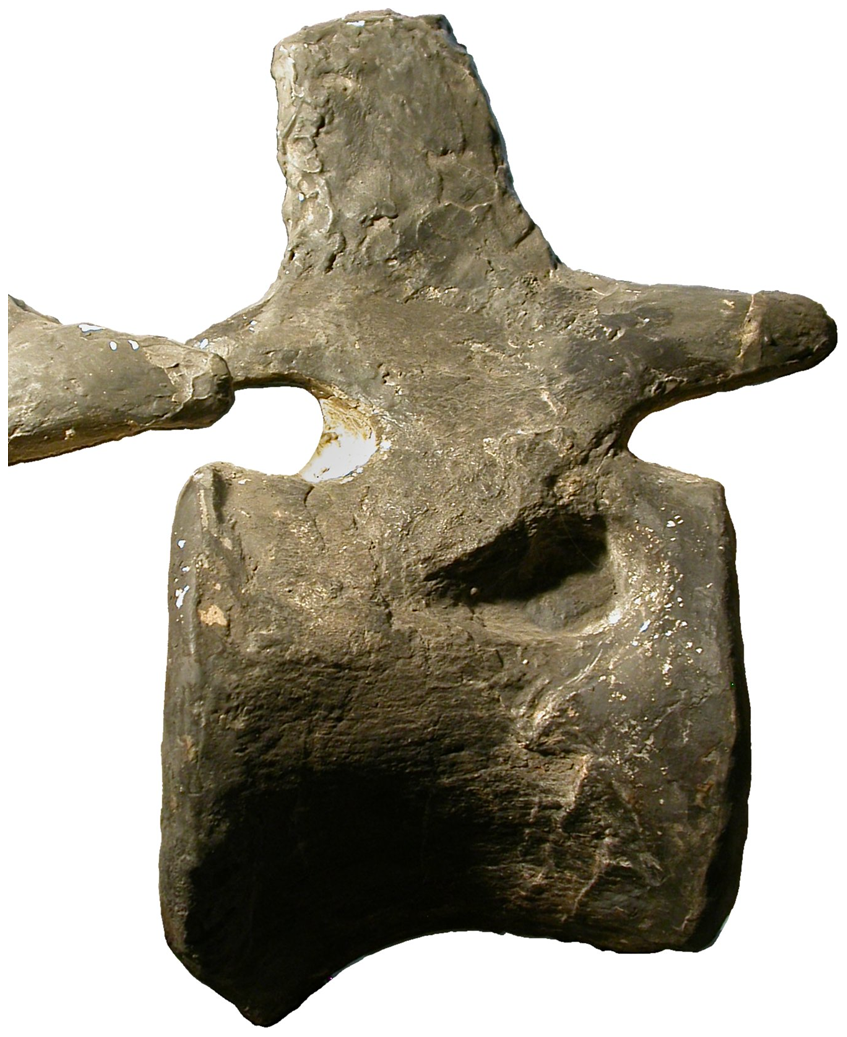
Pneumatic fossa in a caudal vertebra of the B. excelsus holotype

James Spotila et al. (1991) suggest that the large body size of Brontosaurus and other sauropods would have made them unable to maintain high metabolic rates, as they would not be able to release enough heat. However, temperatures in the Jurassic were 3 degrees Celsius higher than present. Furthermore, they assumed that the animals had a reptilian respiratory system. Matt Wedel found that an avian system would have allowed them to dump more heat. Some scientists have also argued that the heart would have had trouble sustaining sufficient blood pressure to oxygenate the brain.

Given the large body mass and long neck of sauropods like Brontosaurus, physiologists have encountered problems determining how these animals breathed. Beginning with the assumption that, like crocodilians, Brontosaurus did not have a diaphragm, the dead-space volume (the amount of unused air remaining in the mouth, trachea, and air tubes after each breath) has been estimated at 0.184 m^{3} (184 L) for a 30 t (30 long tons; 33 short tons) specimen. Paladino calculates its tidal volume (the amount of air moved in or out during a single breath) at 0.904 m^{3} (904 L) with an avian respiratory system, 0.225 m^{3} (225 L) if mammalian, and 0.019 m^{3} (19 L) if reptilian.

Based on this, its respiratory system would likely have consisted of parabronchi, with multiple pulmonary air sacs as in avian lungs, and a flow-through lung. An avian respiratory system would need a lung volume of about 0.60 m^{3} (600 L) compared with a mammalian requirement of 2.95 m^{3} (2,950 L), which would exceed the space available. The overall thoracic volume of the same-sized Apatosaurus has been estimated at 1.7 m^{3} (1,700 L), allowing for a 0.50 m^{3} (500 L), four-chambered heart and a 0.90 m^{3} (900 L) lung capacity. That would allow about 0.30 m^{3} (300 L) for the necessary tissue. Evidence for the avian system in Brontosaurus and other sauropods is also present in the pneumaticity of the vertebrae. Though this plays a role in reducing the weight of the animal, Wedel (2003) states they are also likely connected to air sacs, as in birds.

=== Juveniles ===
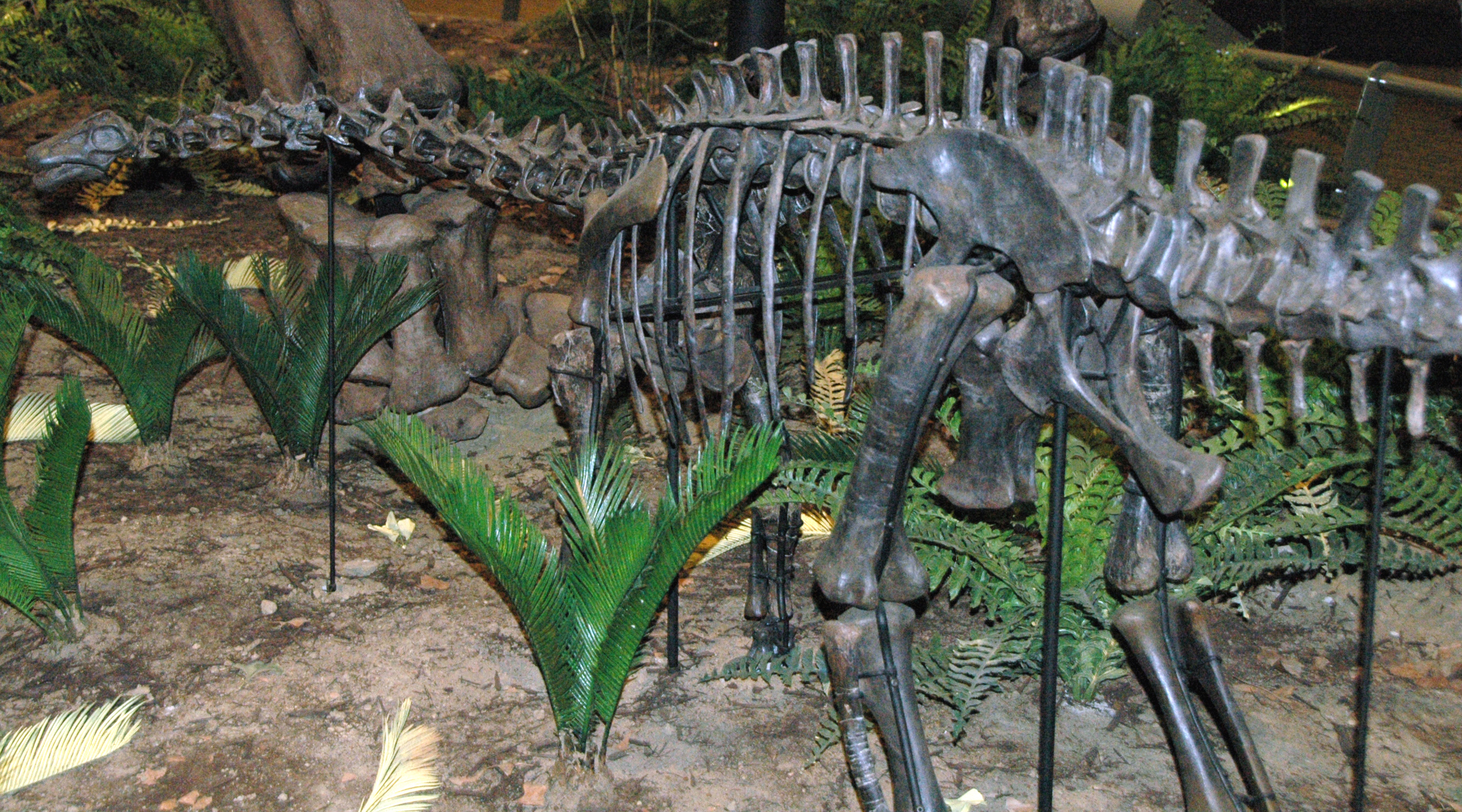
Reconstructed skeleton of a juvenile B. parvus (type specimen CM 566), Carnegie Museum of Natural History

A 1999 microscopic study of Apatosaurus and Brontosaurus bones concluded the animals grew rapidly when young and reached near-adult sizes in about 10 years. In 2008, a study on the growth rates of sauropods was published by biologists Thomas Lehman and Holly Woodward. They said that by using growth lines and length-to-mass ratios, Apatosaurus would have grown to 25 t (25 long tons; 28 short tons) in 15 years, with growth peaking at 5,000 kg (11,000 lb) in a single year. An alternative method, using limb length and body mass, found Brontosaurus and Apatosaurus grew 520 kg (1,150 lb) per year, and reached their full mass before it was about 70 years old. These estimates have been called unreliable because the calculation methods are not sound; old growth lines would have been obliterated by bone remodeling. One of the first identified growth factors of Apatosaurus was the number of sacral vertebrae, which increased to five by the time of the creature's maturity. This was first noted in 1903 and again in 1936.

Juvenile Brontosaurus material is known based on the type specimen of B. parvus. The material of this specimen, CM 566, includes vertebrae from various regions, one pelvic bone, and some bones of the hindlimb. When describing B. parvus, Peterson and Gilmore noted that the neural spines were sutured, the sacral vertebrae were unfused, and the coracoid was missing. All of these features are signs of immaturity in other archosaurs, showing that sauropods had these traits too. Peterson and Gilmore also theorized that sauropods never stopped growing, which supposedly helped in attaining their massive size, a concept unsupported by fossils.

=== Tail ===
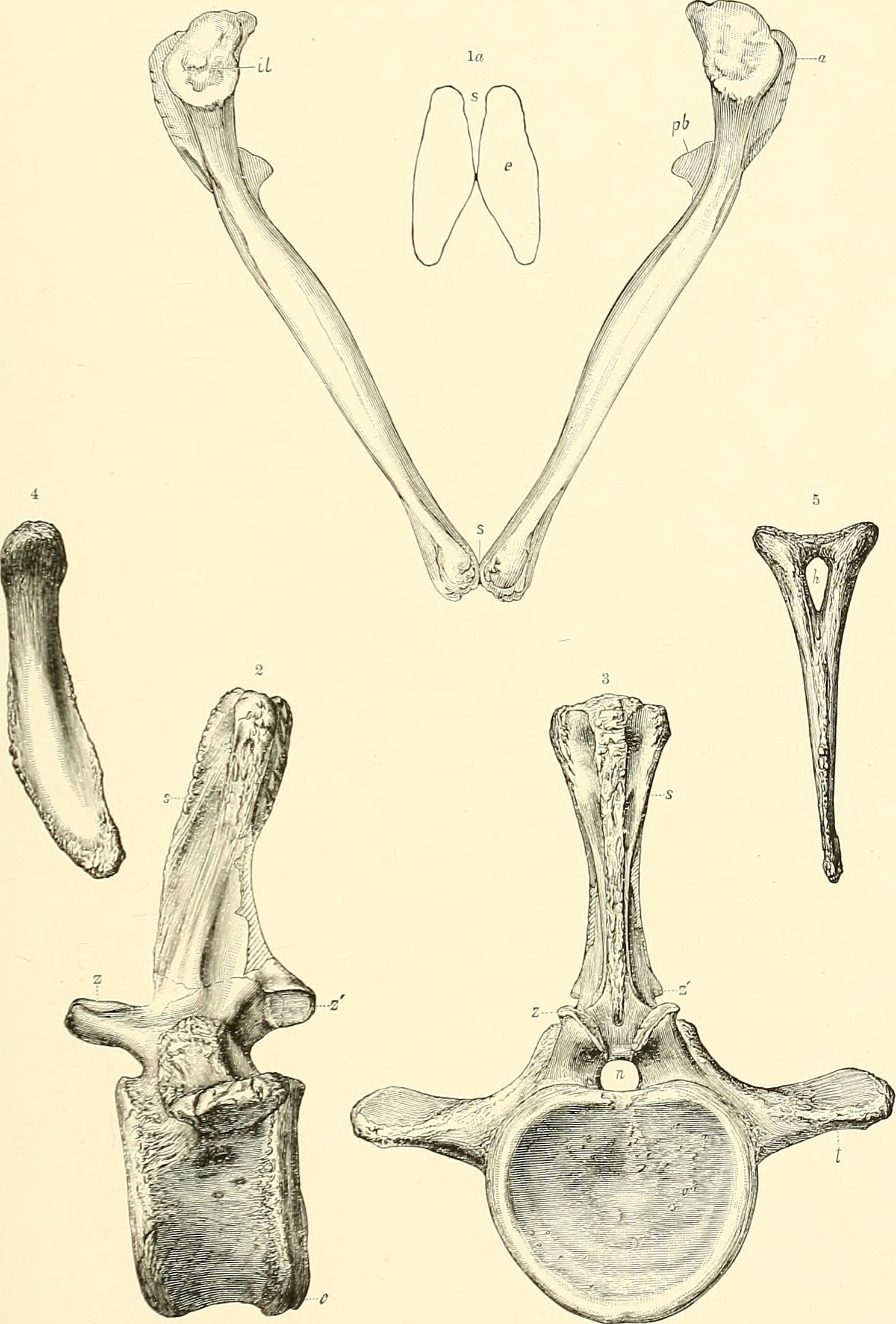
A caudal vertebra (bottom) and other remains of B. excelsus

The estimated tail length of Brontosaurus is approximately 56% of the total body length, with the tail sometimes hypothesized to be capable of functioning like a very long, tapering bullwhip. An article that appeared in the November 1997 issue of Discover magazine reported research into the mechanics of diplodocid tails by Nathan Myhrvold, a computer scientist at Microsoft. Myhrvold carried out a computer simulation of the tail, which in diplodocids like Brontosaurus was a very long, tapering structure resembling a [bullwhip. This computer modeling suggested that sauropods were capable of producing a whip-like cracking sound of over 200 decibels, comparable to the volume of a cannon. There is some circumstantial evidence supporting this as well: a number of diplodocids have been found with fused or damaged tail vertebrae, which may be a symptom of cracking their tails: these are particularly common between the 18th and the 25th caudal vertebra, a region the authors consider a transitional zone between the stiff muscular base and the flexible whiplike section.

However, Rega (2012) notes that Camarasaurus while lacking a tailwhip, displays a similar level of caudal co-ossification and that Mamenchisaurus while having the same pattern of vertebral metrics, lacks a tailwhip and does not display fusion in any "transitional region". Also, the crush fractures which would be expected if the tail was used as a whip have never been found in diplodocids. More recently, Baron (2020) has considered the use of the tail as a bullwhip unlikely because of the potentially catastrophic muscle and skeletal damage such speeds could cause on the large and heavy tail. Instead, he proposes that the tails might have been used as a tactile organ to keep in touch with the individuals behind and to the sides of the animal in a group, which could have augmented cohesion and allowed communication among individuals while limiting more energetically demanding activities like stopping to search for dispersed individuals, turning to visually check on others behind, or communicating vocally.

=== Neck combat ===
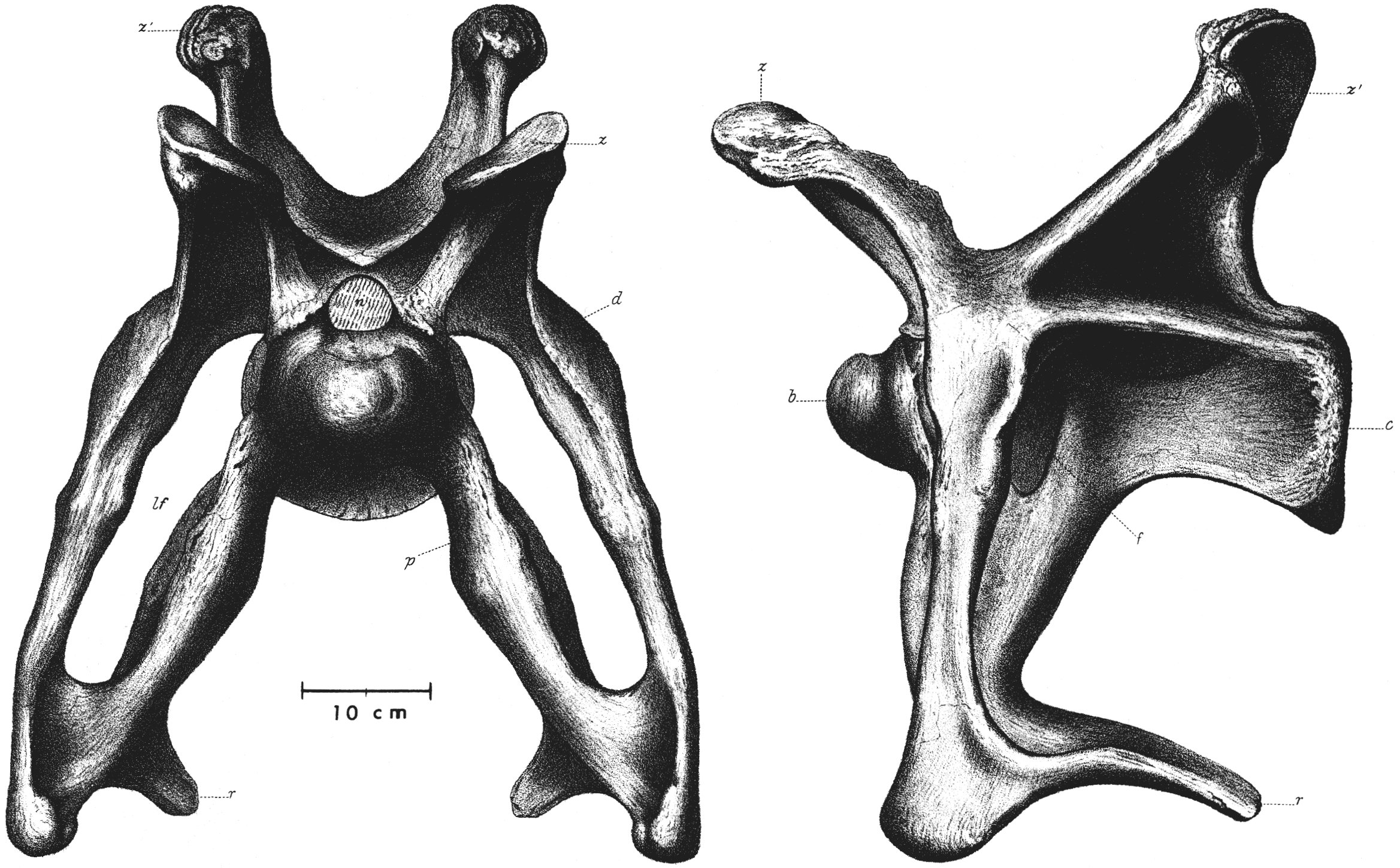
A cervical vertebra of B. excelsus, showing its robusticity

The cervical vertebrae of Brontosaurus and Apatosaurus are robust, which has led to speculation on the use of these structures. These structures had expensive energy requirements, so the reason for their evolution must have been important to the animal. Notable features include dense cervical ribs and diapophyses, ribs that are angled ventrally, and an overall subtriangular cross-section. These traits are in contrast to the more fragile cervicals of diplodocines. Cervical ribs acted as anchors for the longus colli ventralis and flexer colli lateralis muscles, which are used in the downward motion of the neck. Stronger muscles for ventral motions allowed more force to be exerted downward. The cervical ribs formed a "V"-shape, which could be used to shelter the softer underlying tissues of the neck from damage. Ventral sides of the cervical ribs were capped by round, protruding processes. These have been suggested to have been attachment points for bosses or keratinous spikes. A preprint by Wedel et al (2015) thought that due to the combination of these traits, Brontosaurus would use its neck for combat between individuals through the use of striking necks. Behavior like this has been observed in other animals like giraffes and large tortoises.

== Paleoecology ==
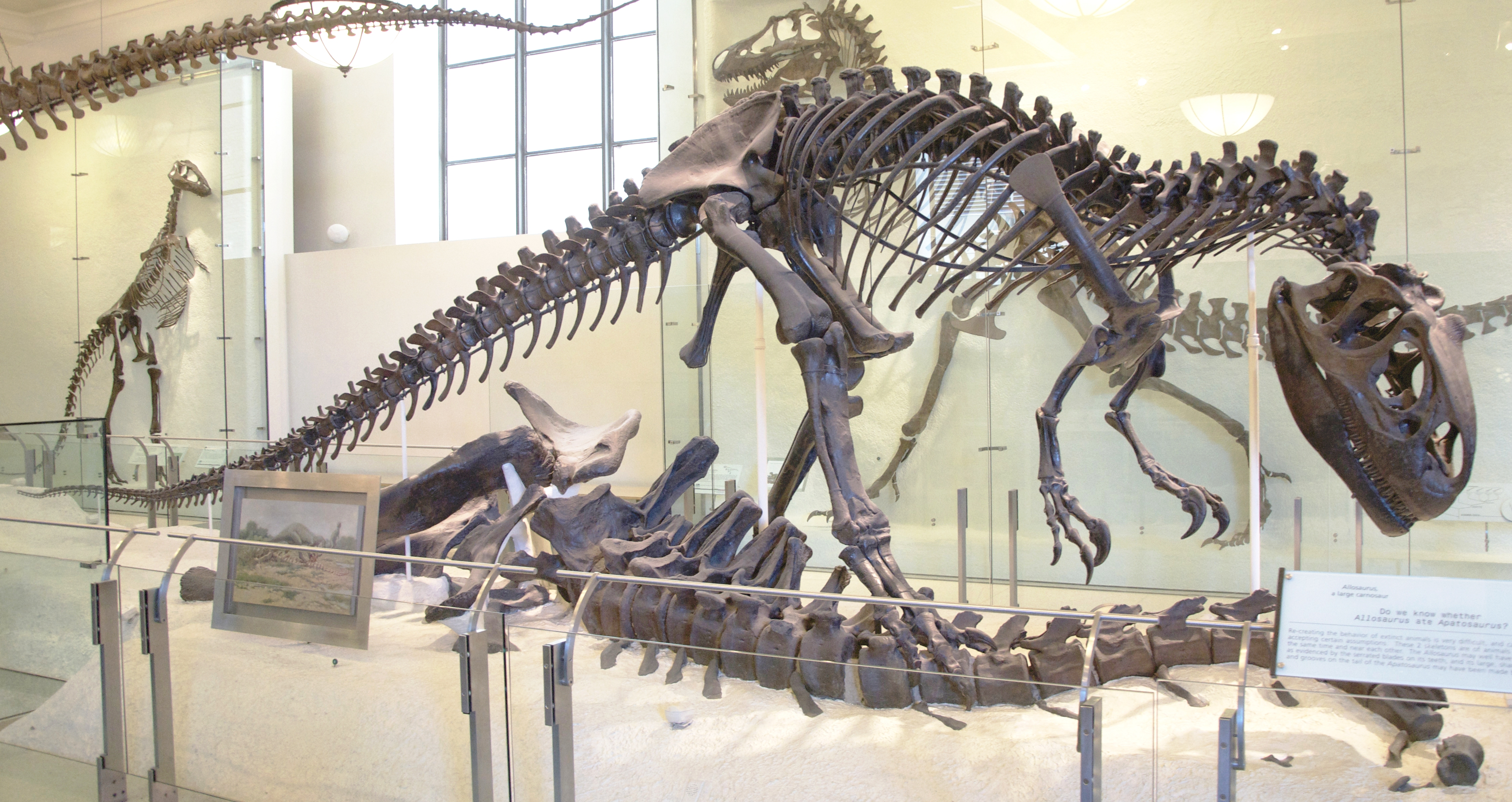
Allosaurus mounted as if feeding on a Brontosaurus carcass, AMNH

The Morrison Formation is a sequence of shallow marine and alluvial sediments which, according to radiometric dating, ranges between 156.3 million years old (Mya) at its base, and 146.8 Mya at the top, which places it in the late Oxfordian, Kimmeridgian, and early Tithonian stages of the Late Jurassic period. This formation is interpreted as a semi-arid environment with distinct wet and dry seasons. The Morrison Basin, where dinosaurs lived, stretched from New Mexico to Alberta and Saskatchewan and was formed when the precursors to the Front Range of the Rocky Mountains started pushing up to the west. The deposits from their east-facing drainage basins were carried by streams and rivers and deposited in swampy lowlands, lakes, river channels, and floodplains. This formation is similar in age to the Lourinhã Formation in Portugal and the Tendaguru Formation in Tanzania.

Brontosaurus may have been a more solitary animal than other Morrison Formation dinosaurs. As a genus, Brontosaurus existed for a long interval, and was found in most levels of the Morrison. B. excelsus fossils have been reported from only the Brushy Basin Member, dating to the late Kimmeridgian age, about 151 Mya. Older Brontosaurus remains have also been identified from the middle Kimmeridgian, and are assigned to B. parvus. Fossils of these animals have been found in Nine Mile Quarry and Bone Cabin Quarry in Wyoming and at sites in Colorado, Oklahoma, and Utah, present in stratigraphic zones 2–6 according to John Foster's model.

The Morrison Formation records an environment and time dominated by gigantic sauropod dinosaurs. Dinosaurs known from the Morrison include the theropods Ceratosaurus, Ornitholestes, and Allosaurus, the sauropods Apatosaurus, Brachiosaurus, Camarasaurus, and Diplodocus, and the ornithischians Camptosaurus, Dryosaurus, and Stegosaurus. Other vertebrates that shared this paleoenvironment included ray-finned fishes, frogs, salamanders, turtles, sphenodonts, lizards, terrestrial and aquatic crocodylomorphs, and several species of pterosaurs. Shells of bivalves and aquatic snails, are also common. The flora of the period has been revealed by fossils of green algae, mosses, horsetails, cycads, ginkgoes, and several families of conifers. Vegetation varied from river-lining forests of tree ferns and ferns (gallery forests), to fern savannas with occasional trees such as the Araucaria-like conifer Brachyphyllum.

== In popular culture ==
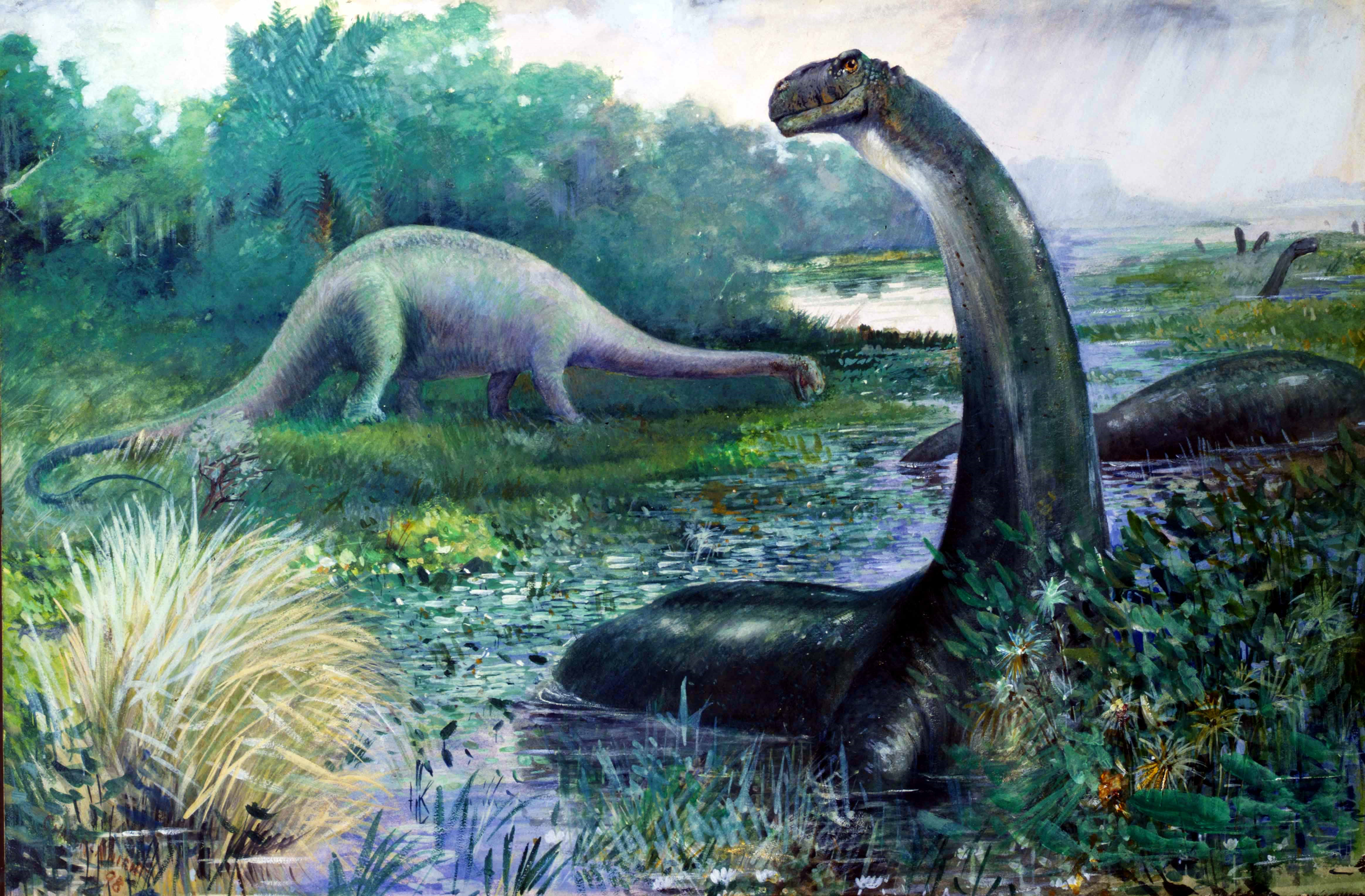
Outdated 1897 restoration by Charles R. Knight of B. excelsus submerged in water, and Diplodocus dragging its tail

The length of time taken for Riggs's 1903 reclassification of Brontosaurus as Apatosaurus to be brought to public notice, as well as Osborn's insistence that the Brontosaurus name be retained despite Riggs's paper, meant that Brontosaurus became one of the most famous dinosaurs. Brontosaurus has often been depicted in cinema, beginning with Winsor McCay's 1914 classic Gertie the Dinosaur, one of the first animated films. McCay based his unidentified dinosaur on the apatosaurine skeleton in the American Museum of Natural History. The 1925 silent film The Lost World featured a battle between a Brontosaurus and an Allosaurus, using special effects by Willis O'Brien. The 1933 film King Kong featured a Brontosaurus chasing Carl Denham, Jack Driscoll and the terrified sailors on Skull Island. In 1938 the assembling of a Brontosaurus skeleton was a major plot point in the Katharine Hepburn and Cary Grant film Bringing Up Baby. These, and other early uses of the animal as a major representative of the group, helped cement Brontosaurus as a quintessential dinosaur in the public consciousness.

Sinclair Oil Corporation has long been a fixture of American roads (and briefly in other countries) with its green dinosaur logo and mascot, a Brontosaurus. While Sinclair's early advertising included a number of different dinosaurs, eventually only Brontosaurus was used as the official logo, due to its popular appeal.

Gertie the Dinosaur (1914)

As late as 1989, the U.S. Postal Service faced controversy when it issued four "dinosaur" stamps: Tyrannosaurus, Stegosaurus, Pteranodon, and Brontosaurus. The use of the term Brontosaurus in place of Apatosaurus led to complaints of "fostering scientific illiteracy." The Postal Service defended itself (in Postal Bulletin 21742) by saying, "Although now recognized by the scientific community as Apatosaurus, the name Brontosaurus was used for the stamp because it is more familiar to the general population." Indeed, the Postal Service even implicitly rebuked the somewhat inconsistent complaints by adding that "[s]imilarly, the term 'dinosaur' has been used generically to describe all the animals [i.e., all four of the animals represented in the given stamp set], even though the Pteranodon was a flying reptile [rather than a true 'dinosaur']," a distinction left unmentioned in the numerous correspondence regarding the Brontosaurus/Apatosaurus issue. Palaeontologist Stephen Jay Gould supported this position. In the essay from which the title of the 1991 collection Bully for Brontosaurus is taken, Gould wrote: "Touché and right on; no one bitched about Pteranodon, and that's a real error." His position, however, was not one suggesting the exclusive use of the popular name; he echoed Riggs' original argument that Brontosaurus is a synonym for Apatosaurus. Nevertheless, he noted that the former has developed and continues to maintain an independent existence in the popular imagination.

American alternative rock band They Might Be Giants for their studio album Book (2021) has a song called "Brontosaurus", being described by AllMusic as one that "uncovers the sensitivity of someone seemingly impervious in a tale that resembles Dumbo as a depressed dinosaur".

The more vociferous denunciations of the usage have elicited sharply defensive statements from those who would not wish to see the name be struck from official usage. Tschopp's study has generated a very high number of responses from many, often opposed, groups — of editorial, news staff, and personal blog nature (both related and not), from both sides of the debate, from related and unrelated contexts, and from all over the world.
