= Paleohistology =

Study of fossilized tissues

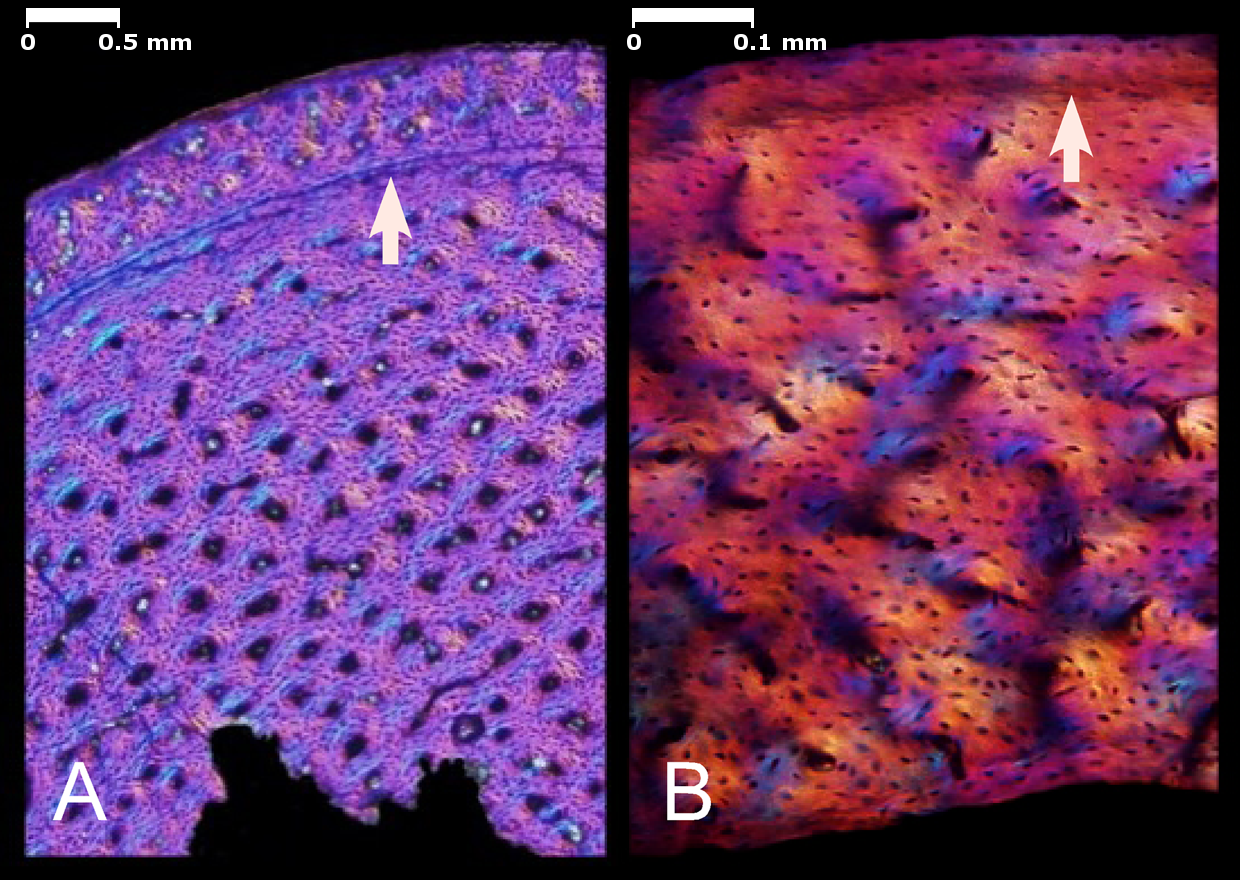
Slice of bone.

Paleohistology is the study of the microstructure of fossilized skeletal tissues, offering insights into the biology, growth patterns, and physiology of extinct organisms.

Despite the decay of organic components, the inorganic elements of bone preserve critical structures such as osteocyte lacunae, vascular canals, and collagen fibers. This highly specialized field within paleontology yields insights into the lives of extinct animals, including growth history and age at death.

== History ==
The microscopic study of biological tissues traces back to 1828 when Henry Witham and William Nicol pioneered techniques for examining petrified tree trunks under a microscope. Subsequently, Louis Agassiz applied these methods to fossil vertebrates. In 1849, John Thomas Quekett published a seminal paper detailing the histological structure of bone across various vertebrate groups, laying the foundation for further research.

Gideon Mantell made significant contributions to paleohistology in the mid-19th century. In 1850, Mantell provided the first clear description of dinosaur bone microstructure, including thin sections from a "dorsal dermal spine" of Hylaerosaurus and a humerus of Pelorosaurus. These observations marked a pivotal moment in the study of ancient tissues, highlighting the preservation of intricate structures in fossilized bone.

Throughout the 20th century, technological advancements revolutionized paleohistology. The introduction of hard plastic resins, tungsten carbide microtome blades, and diamond-edged saw blades enabled researchers to produce thinner sections and conduct more detailed analyses of mineralized tissues. These innovations expanded the scope of paleohistological research, facilitating the examination of fully mineralized bone samples.

In the 1960s and 1970s, Armand de Ricqlès made significant strides in paleohistology by correlating histological features with growth rates and thermal physiology in extinct organisms. Drawing from neontological observations, de Ricqlès demonstrated that avascular bone is deposited more slowly than vascular bone, with implications for understanding the physiology of extinct taxa. His work on dinosaur bone histology suggested physiological similarities between dinosaurs and endothermic birds, challenging prevailing notions of reptilian physiology.

Recent studies in paleohistology have expanded our understanding of ancient tissues, with a focus on quantitative analyses, comparative histology, and interdisciplinary approaches. Ongoing research continues to uncover new insights into the biology and evolution of extinct organisms, leveraging advancements in imaging technology and analytical techniques.

== Methods ==
Paleohistologists employ a variety of techniques to study ancient tissues, including thin sectioning, histological staining, and microscopy. Thin sectioning involves cutting slices of fossilized bone or tooth tissue, which are then mounted on slides and examined under a microscope. Histological staining techniques allow researchers to visualize different tissue types, such as bone, cartilage, and teeth, while microscopy enables detailed examination of cellular structures.

Recent advances in imaging technology, such as confocal microscopy and synchrotron radiation, have revolutionized paleohistology by providing higher resolution imaging and non-destructive analysis of fossil specimens.

== Applications ==
Paleohistology has diverse applications in paleontology, evolutionary biology, and related fields. By analyzing the microstructure of fossilized tissues, paleohistologists can infer growth rates, metabolic rates, and physiological adaptations of extinct organisms. This information contributes to our understanding of vertebrate evolution, including the origins of flight in birds, the evolution of mammalian reproduction, and the diversity of dinosaurian growth strategies.

Additionally, paleohistological data can provide insights into paleoecological dynamics, such as population demographics, habitat preferences, and responses to environmental change. By reconstructing past environments and ecosystems, paleohistology helps scientists understand the long-term effects of climate change, mass extinctions, and other evolutionary processes.
