= Tony Sarg =

German-American puppeteer

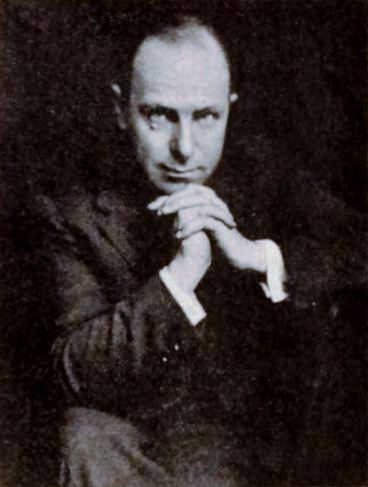
- Sarg from a 1921 magazine
- Born: April 21, 1880; Cobán, Guatemala
- Died: March 7, 1942 (aged 61); Manhattan, New York, U.S.
- Occupations: Puppeteer, writer, animator
- Years active: 1915–1935

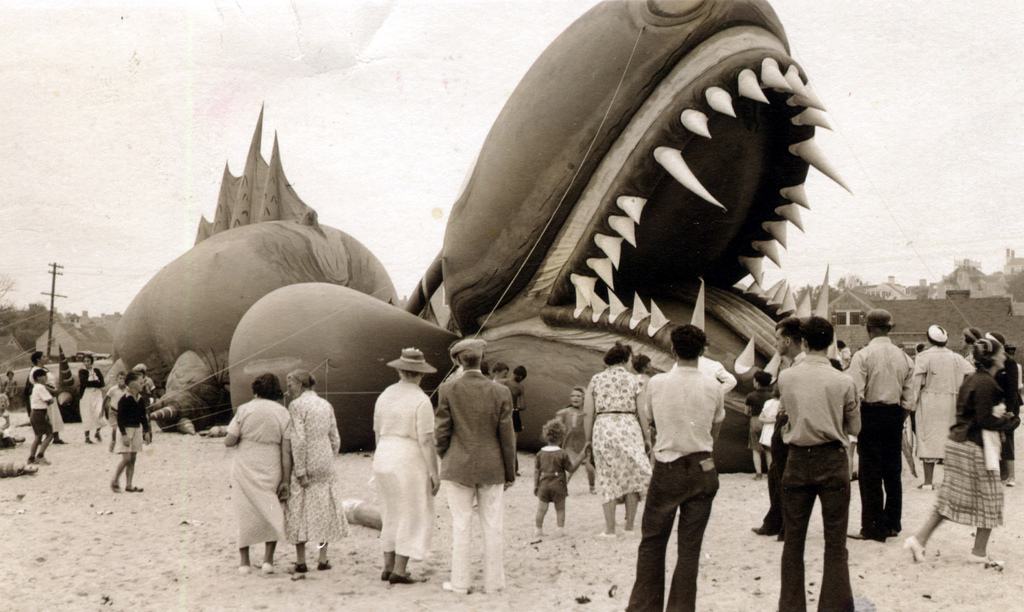
Sarg's Nantucket Sea Serpent, 1937.

The First Circus (1921)

The Original Movie (1922)

Anthony Frederick Sarg (April 21, 1880 – March 7, 1942) was a German American puppeteer and illustrator. He was described as "America's Puppet Master", and in his biography as the father of modern puppetry in North America.

== Early life ==
Tony Sarg was born in Cobán, Guatemala, to diplomat Francis Charles Sarg, a consul representing Germany, and his English wife, Mary Elizabeth Parker. His father was a son of Mary Ellen Best.

The family returned to the German Empire in 1887 [but note conflict that father Franz Sarg remained Consul until 1894]; Sarg entered a military academy at age 14 and received a commission as lieutenant at 17; in 1905 (in his mid-20s) he resigned his commission and took up residence in the United Kingdom.

There, he pursued a relationship with Bertha Eleanor McGowan, an American he had met when she was a tourist in Germany. They were married in her hometown of Cincinnati, Ohio, January 20, 1909, and returned to England, where their daughter Mary was born two years later. In 1914, with the start of World War I, he sent Bertha and the children to Cincinnati, followed them soon after, and settled the family in New York City in 1915. In 1920, he became a naturalized citizen of the United States.

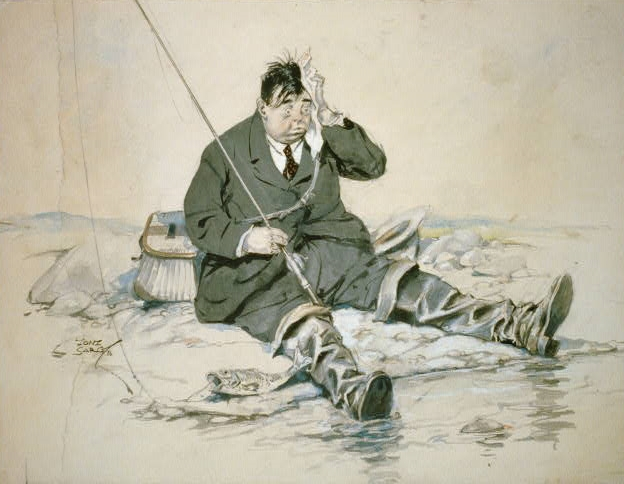
Portrait of Irvin S. Cobb by Tony Sarg. Illustration for Cobb's "The Battle Hen of the Republic" in The Saturday Evening Post, Oct. 1918.

== Career ==
He had been raised around puppets, inherited his grandmother's collection of them, developed them as a hobby that enhanced the impression he made on other artists, and finally in 1917, turned them into a profession.

In 1921, Sarg animated the film The First Circus, an inventive cartoon for producer Herbert M. Dawley, who was credited as co-animator. Sarg went on to produce a series of cartoons known as Tony Sarg's Almanac, from 1921 to 1923.

In 1928, he designed, and his protégé Bil Baird built, tethered helium-filled balloons up to 125 ft (38 m) long, resembling animals, for the New York institution of Macy's department store. This work involved a number of puppetry-related principles. These creations were featured in the store's Thanksgiving Day parade. In 1935, he undertook the puppet-related work of designing Macy's elaborate animated window display, which was shown between Thanksgiving and Christmas.

The pinnacle of Sarg's visibility occurred at the 1933 Chicago World's Fair, where his cumulative audience was 3 million; Baird was involved in this production, as were Rufus Rose and Margo Rose.

Sarg stepped back from competing with other puppet studios, and pursued illustrating magazine covers, guide books, and original children's picture books, games, and toys. He designed salons and sophisticated interiors for high-end department stores and restaurants, including the supper club at New York's Waldorf Astoria. He designed extensively for the New York World's Fair, in 1939, creating the fair's official pictorial map, and numerous colorful and modernistic fabrics with World's Fair themes for lady's scarves, handkerchiefs, dresses, table linens, and upholstery, which were sold through Lord & Taylor Department Store. His protégé, Bil Baird, went on to design the puppets featured in the film The Sound of Music.

== Death ==
On February 17, 1942, Sarg had surgery for a ruptured appendix, and died on March 7, 1942, of complications arising from it. He is buried at Spring Grove Cemetery in Cincinnati, Ohio.

== Legacy ==
The Academy Film Archive has preserved several of Tony Sarg's films, including The Original Movie, When the Whale Was Jonahed, Why They Love Cavemen, The First Earful, and Why Adam Walked the Floor.

== Filmography ==
All films co-animated and produced by Herbert M. Dawley

- The First Circus (May 8, 1921)
- The Tooth Carpenter (May 21, 1921)
- Why They Love Cavemen (July 2, 1921)
- When The Wale Was Jonahed (August 20, 1921)
- Fireman, Save My Child (September 11, 1921)
- The Original Golfer (January 7, 1922)
- Why Adam Walked the Floor (February 5, 1922)
- The Original Movie (April 9, 1922)
- The First Earful (May 29, 1922)
- Noah Put The Cat Out (July 9, 1922)
- The First Degree (July 29, 1922)
- The First Barber (August 27, 1922)
- Baron Bragg and the Devilish Dragon (September 24, 1922)
- The First Flivver (October 22, 1922)
- The Ogling Ogre (November 19, 1922)
- Baron Bragg and the Haunted Castle (December 17, 1922)
- The Terrible Tree (January 14, 1923)

== See also ==
- Tony Sarg: Illustrator and Puppeteer article by Michael Mullen, Movable Stationery (newsletter of the Movable Book Society), v.3, n3, April 1995, pages 1–2. Profile and outline of Sarg's mechanical books.
- Michael R. Harrison, "Tony Sarg on Nantucket," Historic Nantucket 74:1 (Spring 2024), 5-17.
- Stephanie Haboush Plunkett and Lenore D. Miller, Tony Sarg: Genius at Play: Adventures in Illustration, Puppetry, and Popular Culture (New York: Abbeville Press, 2023).
- Deborah Sorensen, "Tony Sarg's Moving Pictures," Historic Nantucket 74:2 (Early Fall 2024), 9-17.
