= Potter Creek =

Potter Creek may refer to:

- Potter Creek (Hastings County), a stream in Central Ontario, Canada
- Potter Creek (Nipissing District), a stream in Northeastern Ontario, Canada

== See also ==
- Porter Creek North, an electoral district in Yukon, Canada
- Porter Creek South, an electoral district in Yukon, Canada
