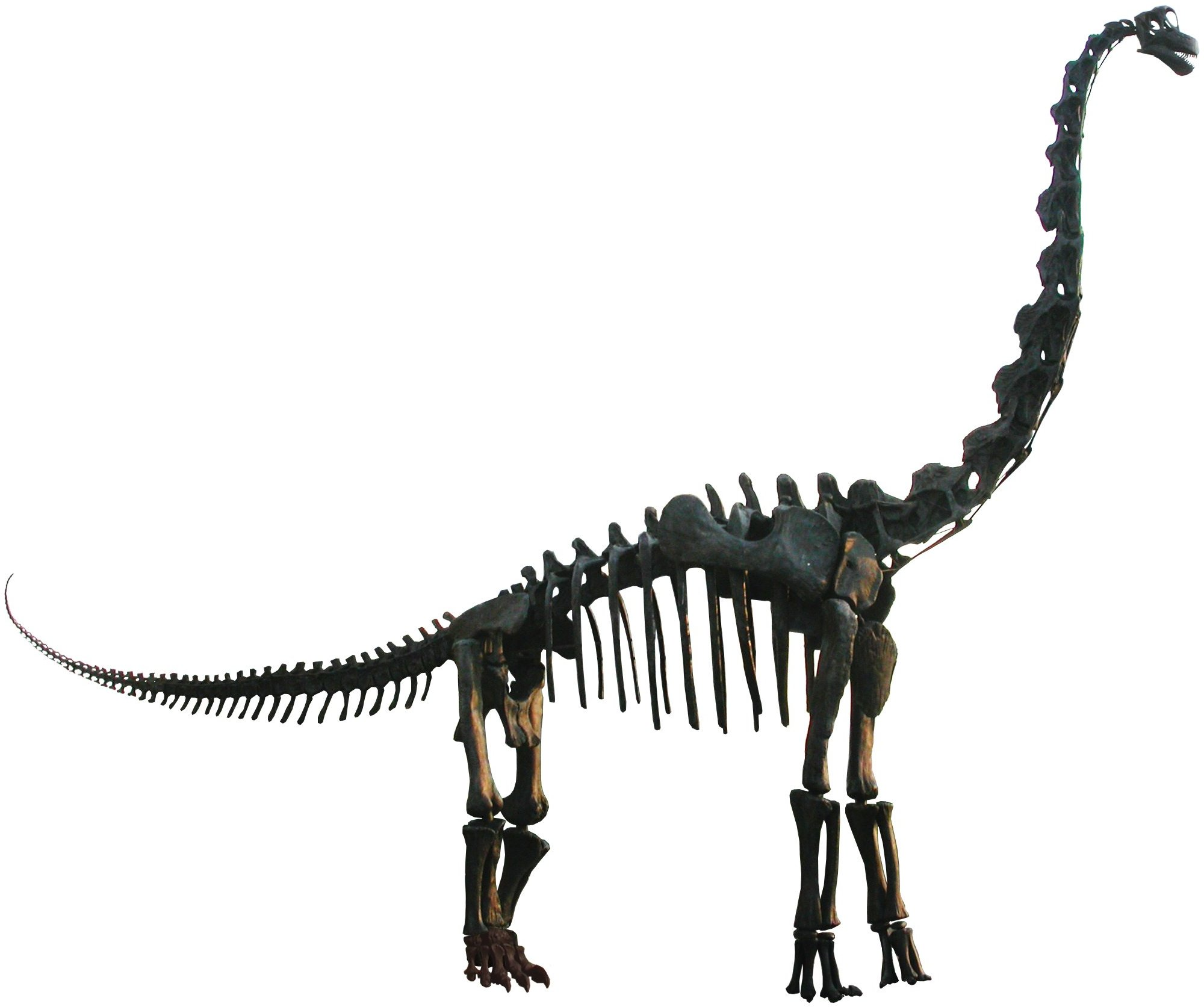
- Reconstructed replica of the holotype skeleton outside the Field Museum of Natural History

Scientific classification
- Kingdom: Animalia
- Phylum: Chordata
- Class: Reptilia
- Clade: Dinosauria
- Clade: Saurischia
- Clade: †Sauropodomorpha
- Clade: †Sauropoda
- Clade: †Macronaria
- Clade: †Titanosauriformes
- Family: †Brachiosauridae
- Genus: †Brachiosaurus; Riggs (1903)
- Species: †B. altithorax

Binomial name
- †Brachiosaurus altithorax Riggs, 1903

= Brachiosaurus =

Brachiosaurus Temporal range: Late Jurassic (Kimmeridgian to Tithonian), 155.6–145.5 Ma

Sauropod dinosaur genus from the late Jurassic Period

Brachiosaurus (/ˌbrækiəˈsɔːrəs/) is a genus of sauropod dinosaur that lived in North America during the Late Jurassic, about 155.6 to 145.5 million years ago. It was first described by American paleontologist Elmer S. Riggs in 1903 from fossils found in the Colorado River valley in western Colorado, United States. Riggs named the dinosaur Brachiosaurus altithorax; the generic name is Greek for "arm lizard", in reference to its proportionately long arms, and the specific name means "deep chest". Brachiosaurus is estimated to have been between 18 and 22 meters (59 and 72 ft) long; body mass estimates of the subadult holotype specimen range from 28.3 to 46.9 metric tons (31.2 to 51.7 short tons). It had a disproportionately long neck, small skull, and large overall size, all of which are typical for sauropods. Atypically, Brachiosaurus had longer forelimbs than hindlimbs, which resulted in a steeply inclined trunk and a proportionally shorter tail.

Brachiosaurus is the namesake genus of the family Brachiosauridae, which includes a handful of other similar sauropods. Most popular depictions of Brachiosaurus are in fact based on Giraffatitan, a genus of brachiosaurid dinosaur from the Tendaguru Formation of Tanzania. Giraffatitan was originally described by German paleontologist Werner Janensch in 1914 as a species of Brachiosaurus, B. brancai, but moved to its own genus in 2009. Three other species of Brachiosaurus have been named on the basis of fossils found in Africa and Europe; two are no longer considered valid, and a third has become a separate genus, Lusotitan.

The type specimen of B. altithorax is still the most complete specimen, and only a few other specimens are thought to belong to the genus, making it one of the rarer sauropods of the Morrison Formation. It is regarded as a high browser, possibly cropping or nipping vegetation as high as 9 meters (30 ft) off the ground. Unlike other sauropods, it was unsuited for rearing on its hindlimbs. It has been used as an example of a dinosaur that was most likely ectothermic because of its large size and the corresponding need for sufficient forage, but more recent research suggests it was warm-blooded. Among the most iconic and initially thought to be one of the largest dinosaurs, Brachiosaurus has appeared in popular culture, notably in the 1993 film Jurassic Park.

== History of discovery ==
=== Holotype specimen ===
The genus Brachiosaurus is based on a partial postcranial skeleton discovered in 1900 in the valley of the Colorado River near Fruita, Colorado. This specimen, which was later declared the holotype, comes from rocks of the Brushy Basin Member of the Morrison Formation, and therefore is late Kimmeridgian in age, about 154 to 153 million years old. Discovered by American paleontologist Elmer S. Riggs and his crew from the Field Columbian Museum (now the Field Museum of Natural History) of Chicago, it is currently cataloged as FMNH P 25107.

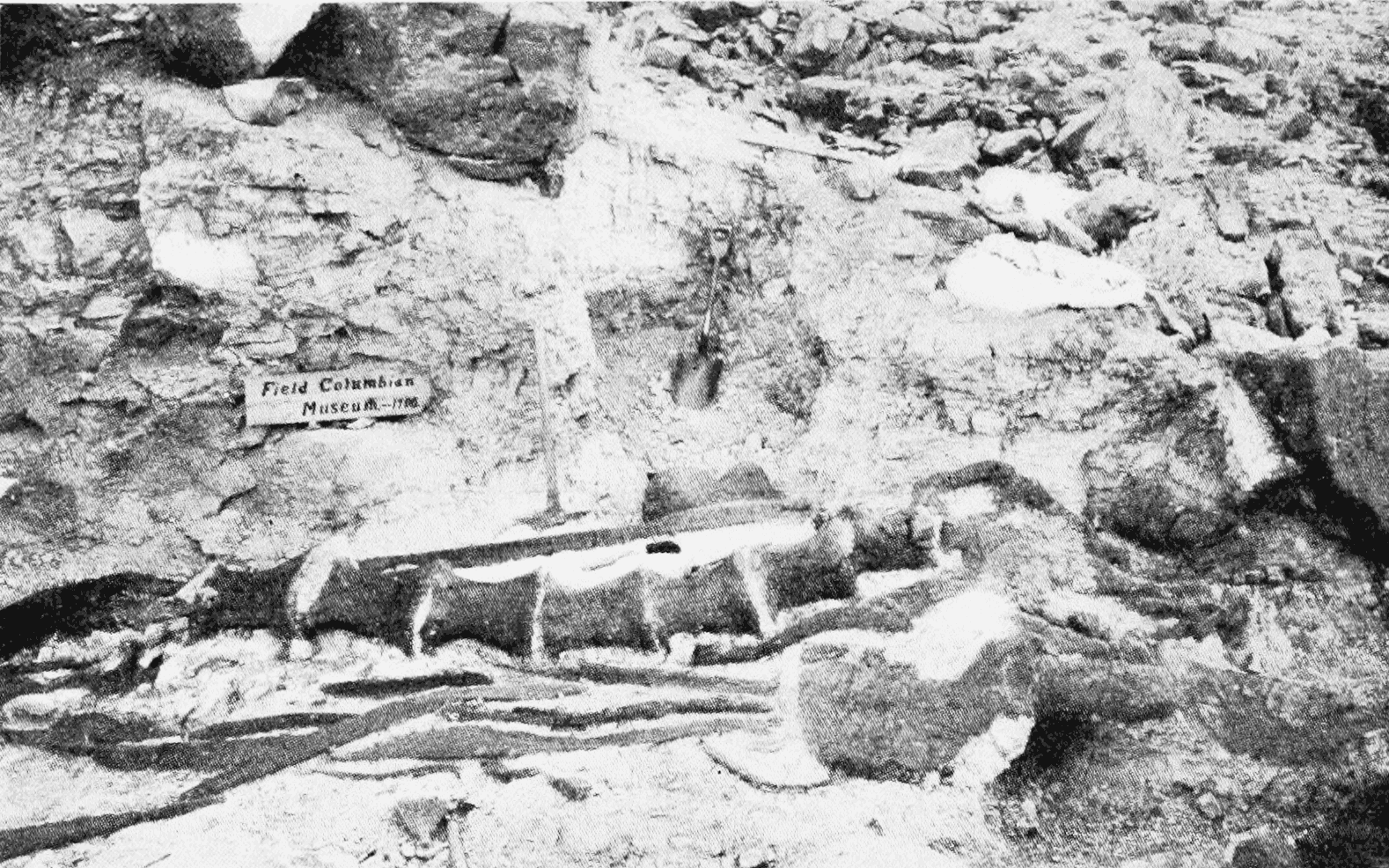
Holotype material during excavation. Dorsal vertebrae, sacrum, ilium and ribs are in view.

Riggs and company were working in the area as a result of favorable correspondence between Riggs and Stanton Merill Bradbury, a dentist in nearby Grand Junction. In the spring of 1899 Riggs had sent letters to mayors in western Colorado, inquiring after possible trails leading from railway heads into northeastern Utah, where he hoped to find fossils of Eocene mammals. To his surprise, he was informed by Bradbury, an amateur collector himself and president of the Western Colorado Academy of Science, that dinosaur bones had been collected near Grand Junction since 1885. Riggs was skeptical of this claim, but his superior, curator of geology Oliver Cummings Farrington, was very eager to add a large sauropod skeleton to the collection to outdo other institutions, and convinced the museum management to invest five hundred dollars in an expedition. Arriving on June 20, 1900, they set camp at the abandoned Goat Ranch. During a prospecting trip on horseback, Riggs's field assistant Harold William Menke found the humerus of FMNH P 25107, on July 4, exclaiming it was "the biggest thing yet!". Riggs at first took the find for a badly preserved Brontosaurus specimen and gave priority to excavating Quarry 12, which held a more promising Morosaurus skeleton. Having secured that, on July 26 he returned to the humerus in Quarry 13, which soon proved to be of enormous size, convincing a puzzled Riggs that he had discovered the largest land animal ever.

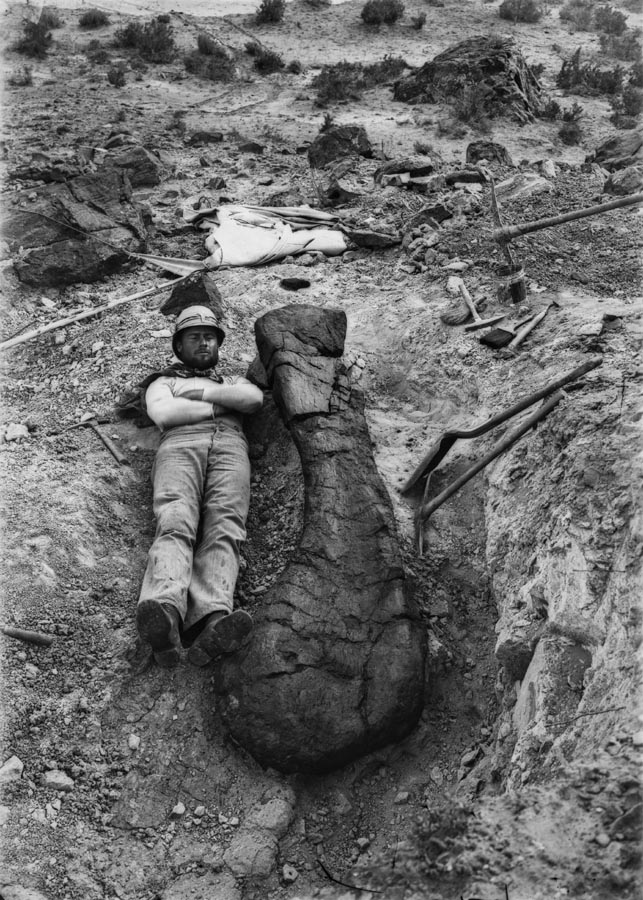
An expedition member lying by the humerus during the excavation in 1900

The site, Riggs Quarry 13, is located on a small hill later known as Riggs Hill; it is today marked by a plaque. More Brachiosaurus fossils are reported on Riggs Hill, but other fossil finds on the hill have been vandalized. During excavation of the specimen, Riggs misidentified the humerus as a deformed femur due to its great length, and this seemed to be confirmed when an equally-sized, well-preserved real femur of the same skeleton was discovered. In 1904 Riggs noted: "Had it not been for the unusual size of the ribs found associated with it, the specimen would have been discarded as an Apatosaur, too poorly preserved to be of value." It was only after preparation of the fossil material in the laboratory that the bone was recognized as a humerus. The excavation attracted large numbers of visitors, delaying the work and forcing Menke to guard the site to prevent bones from being looted. On August 17, the last bone was jacketed in plaster. After a concluding ten-day prospecting trip, the expedition returned to Grand Junction and hired a team and wagon to transport all fossils to the railway station, during five days; another week was spent to pack them in thirty-eight crates with a weight of 5,700 kilograms (12,500 lb). On September 10, Riggs left for Chicago by train, arriving on the 15th; the railroad companies let both passengers and cargo travel for free, as a public relations gesture.

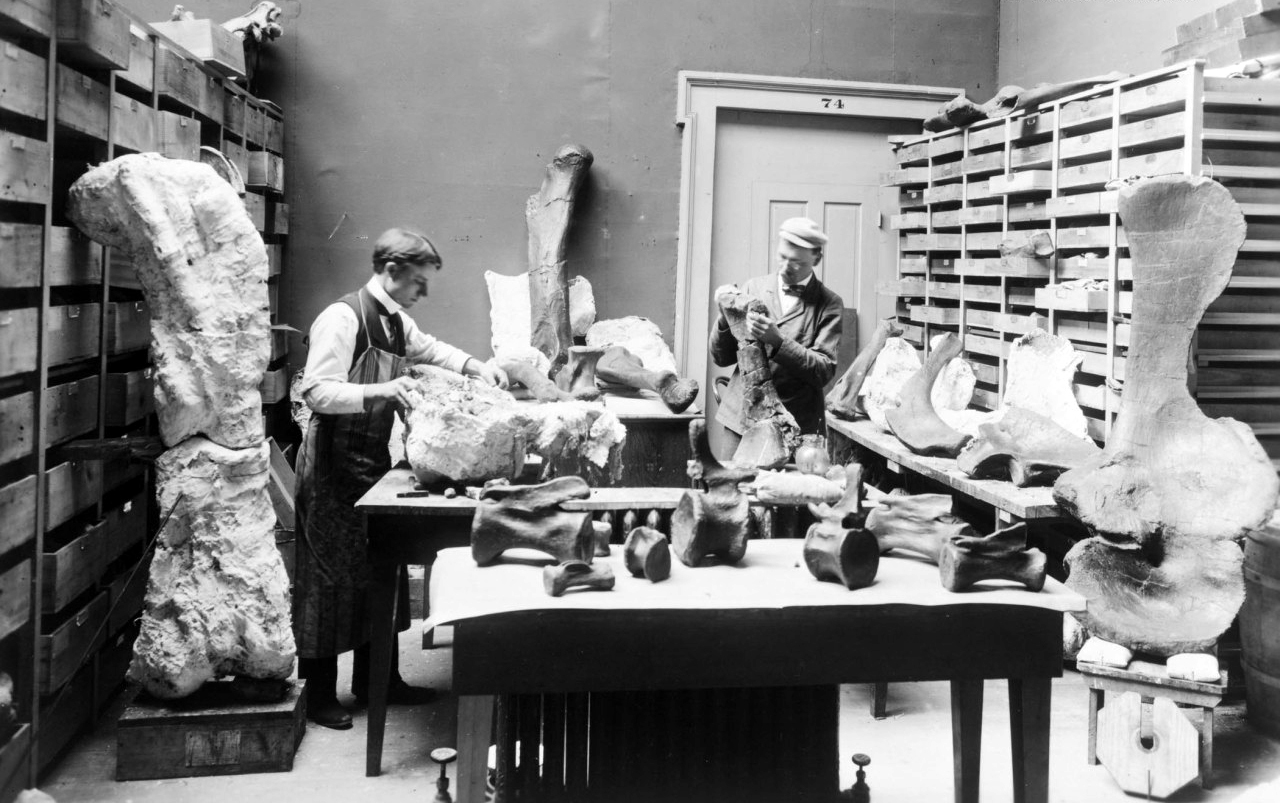
Riggs (right) and laboratory assistant working on the holotype bones in 1899. The still-jacketed thighbone can be seen on the left.

The holotype skeleton consists of the right humerus (upper arm bone), the right femur (thigh bone), the right ilium (a hip bone), the right coracoid (a shoulder bone), the sacrum (fused vertebrae of the hip), the last seven thoracic (trunk) and two caudal (tail) vertebrae, and several ribs. Riggs described the coracoid as from the left side of the body, but restudy has shown it to be a right coracoid. At the time of discovery, the lower end of the humerus, the underside of the sacrum, the ilium and the preserved caudal vertebrae were exposed to the air and thus partly damaged by weathering. The vertebrae were only slightly shifted out of their original anatomical position; they were found with their top sides directed downward. The ribs, humerus, and coracoid, however, were displaced to the left side of the vertebral column, indicating transportation by a water current. This is further evidenced by an isolated ilium of Diplodocus that apparently had drifted against the vertebral column, as well as by a change in composition of the surrounding rocks. While the specimen itself was embedded in fine-grained clay, indicating low-energy conditions at the time of deposition, it was cut off at the seventh presacral vertebra by a thick layer of much coarser sediments consisting of pebbles at its base and sandstone further up, indicating deposition under stronger currents. Based on this evidence, Riggs in 1904 suggested that the missing front part of the skeleton was washed away by a water current, while the hind part was already covered by sediment and thus got preserved.

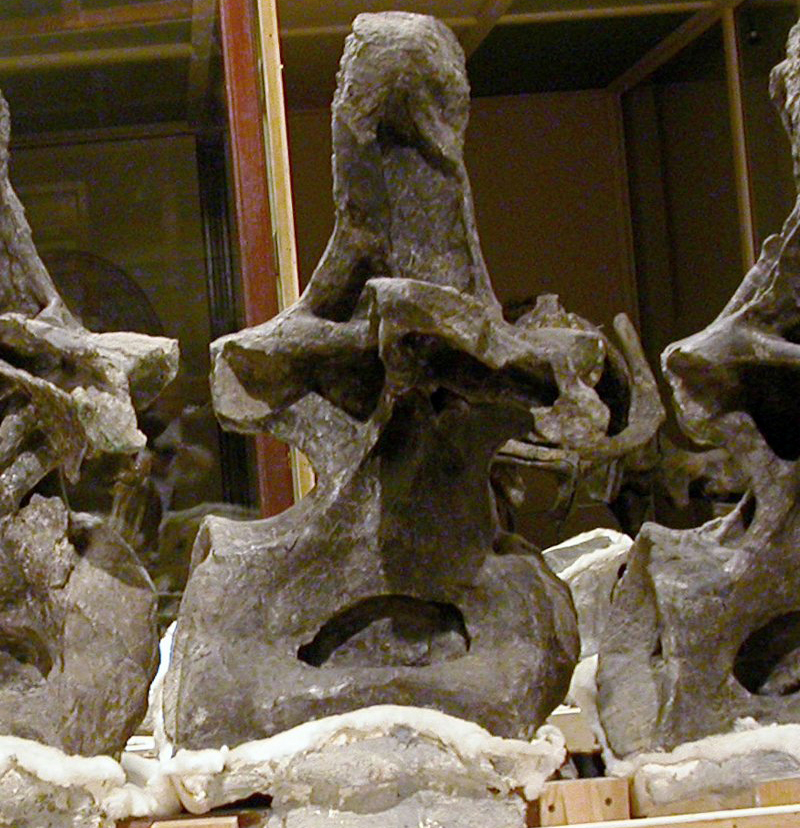
Dorsal vertebra of the holotype, Field Museum

Riggs published a short report of the new find in 1901, noting the unusual length of the humerus compared to the femur and the extreme overall size and the resulting giraffe-like proportions, as well as the lesser development of the tail, but did not publish a name for the new dinosaur. In 1903, he named the type species Brachiosaurus altithorax. Riggs derived the genus name from the Greek brachion/βραχίων meaning "arm" and sauros/σαυρος meaning "lizard", because he realized that the length of the arms was unusual for a sauropod. The specific epithet was chosen because of the unusually deep and wide chest cavity, from Latin altus "deep" and Greek thorax/θώραξ, "breastplate, cuirass, corslet". Latin thorax was derived from the Greek and had become a usual scientific designation for the chest of the body. The titles of Riggs's 1901 and 1903 articles emphasized that the specimen was the "largest-known dinosaur". Riggs followed his 1903 publication with a more detailed description in a monograph in 1904.

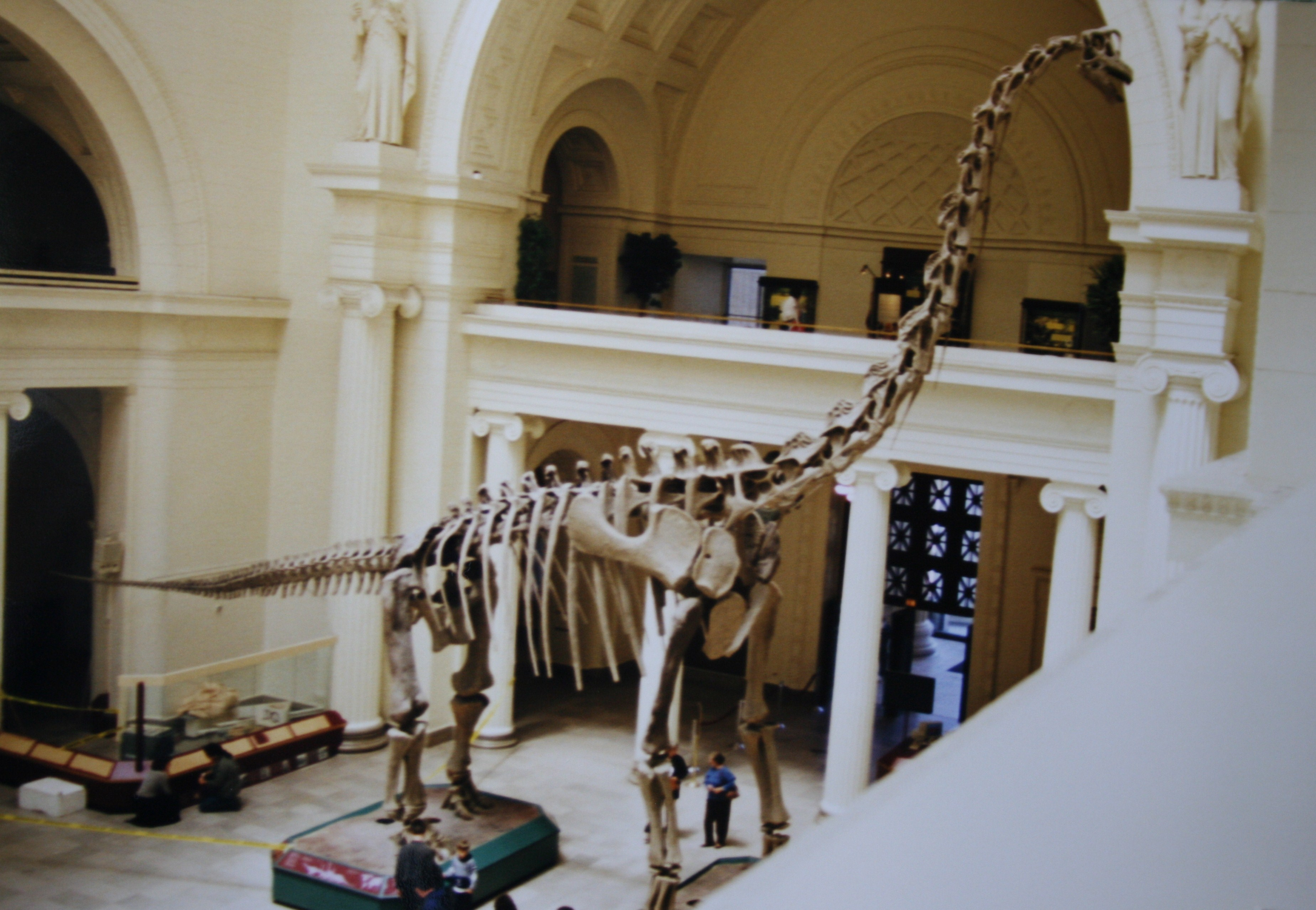
Reconstructed skeleton as displayed inside the Field Museum in the 1990s

Preparation of the holotype began in the fall of 1900 shortly after it was collected by Riggs for the Field Museum. First the limb elements were processed. In the winter of 1904, the badly weathered vertebrae of the back and hip were prepared by James B. Abbott and C.T. Kline. As the preparation of each bone was finished, it was put on display in a glass case in Hall 35 of the Fine Arts Palace of the Worlds Columbian Exposition, the Field Museum's first location. All the bones were, solitarily, still on display by 1908 in Hall 35 when the Field Museum's newly mounted Apatosaurus was unveiled, the very specimen Riggs had found in Quarry 12, today catalogued as FMNH P25112 and identified as a Brontosaurus exemplar.

No mount of Brachiosaurus was attempted at the time because only twenty percent of the skeleton had been recovered. In 1993, the holotype bones were molded and cast, and the missing bones were sculpted based on material of the related Brachiosaurus brancai (now Giraffatitan) in Museum für Naturkunde, Berlin. This plastic skeleton was mounted and, in 1994, put on display at the north end of Stanley Field Hall, the main exhibit hall of the Field Museum's current building. The real bones of the holotype were put on exhibit in two large glass cases at either end of the mounted cast. The mount stood until 1999, when it was moved to the B Concourse of United Airlines' Terminal One in O'Hare International Airport to make room for the museum's newly acquired Tyrannosaurus skeleton, "Sue". At the same time, the Field Museum mounted a second plastic cast of the skeleton (designed for outside use) which was on display outside the museum on the NW terrace until 2022. Another outdoor cast was sent to Disney's Animal Kingdom to serve as a gateway icon for the "DinoLand, U.S.A." area, known as the "Oldengate Bridge" that connects the two halves of the fossil quarry themed Boneyard play area.

=== Assigned material ===
Composite skeletal reconstruction, scaled to the holotype

Further discoveries of Brachiosaurus material in North America have been uncommon and consist of a few bones. To date, material can be unambiguously ascribed only to the genus when overlapping with the holotype material, and any referrals of elements from the skull, neck, anterior dorsal region, or distal limbs or feet remain tentative. Nevertheless, material has been described from Colorado, Oklahoma, Utah, and Wyoming, and undescribed material has been mentioned from several other sites.

In 1883, farmer Marshall Parker Felch, a fossil collector for the American paleontologist Othniel Charles Marsh, reported the discovery of a sauropod skull in Felch Quarry 1, near Garden Park, Colorado. The skull was found in yellowish white sandstone, near a 1-meter-long (3 ft 3 1/2 in) cervical vertebra, which was destroyed during an attempt to collect it. The skull was cataloged as YPM 1986, and sent to Marsh at the Peabody Museum of Natural History, who incorporated it into his 1891 skeletal restoration of Brontosaurus (perhaps because Felch had identified it as belonging to that dinosaur). The Felch Quarry skull consists of the cranium, the maxillae, the right postorbital, part of the left maxilla, the left squamosal, the dentaries, and a possible partial pterygoid. The bones were roughly prepared for Marsh, which led to some damage. Felch also collected several postcranial fossils, including a partial cervical vertebra and partial forelimb. Most of the specimens collected by Felch were sent to the National Museum of Natural History in 1899 after Marsh's death, including the skull, which was then cataloged as USNM 5730.

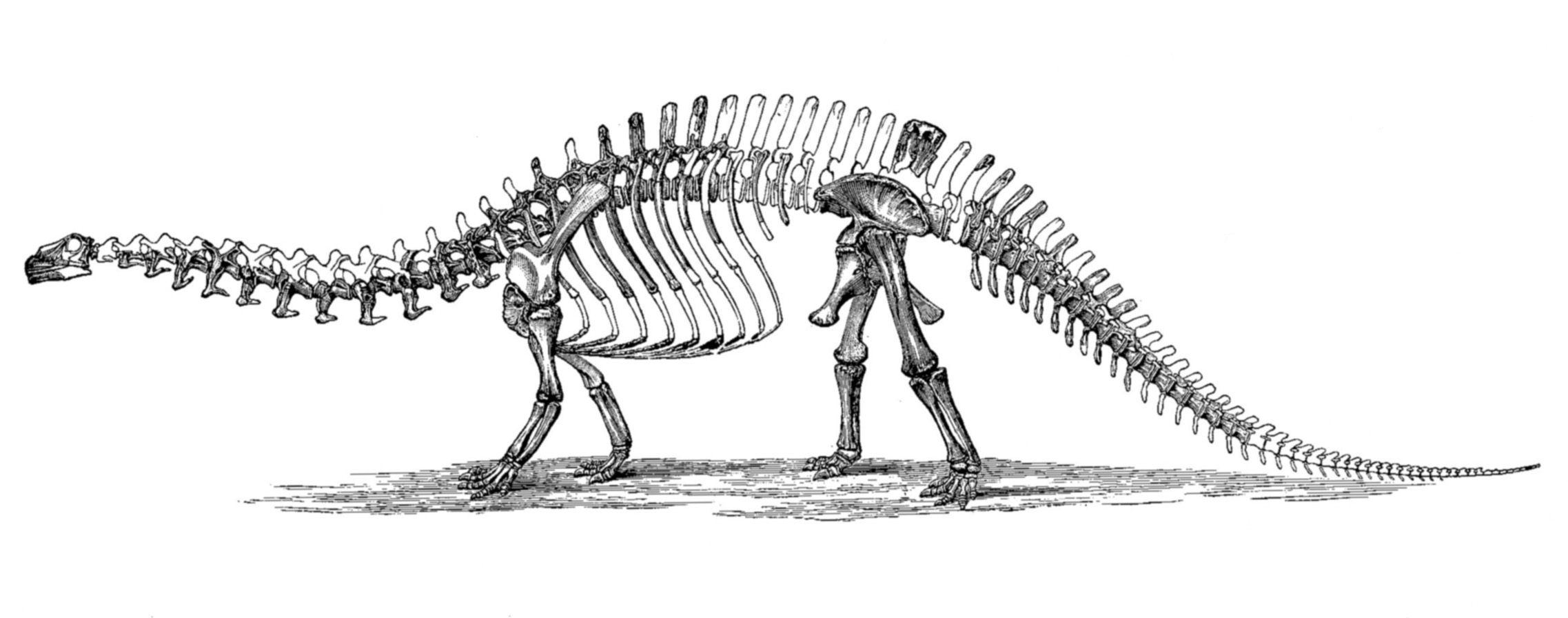
O. C. Marsh's outdated 1891 skeletal reconstruction of Brontosaurus, with skull inaccurately based on that of the Felch Quarry Brachiosaurus

In 1975 the American paleontologists Jack McIntosh and David Berman investigated the historical issue of whether Marsh had assigned an incorrect skull to Brontosaurus (at the time thought to be a junior synonym of Apatosaurus), and found the Felch Quarry skull to be of "the general Camarasaurus type", while suggesting that the vertebra found near it belonged to Brachiosaurus. They concluded that if Marsh had not arbitrarily assigned the Felch quarry skull and another Camarasaurus-like skull to Brontosaurus, it would have been recognized earlier that the actual skull of Brontosaurus and Apatosaurus was more similar to that of Diplodocus. McIntosh later tentatively recognized the Felch Quarry skull as belonging to Brachiosaurus, and brought it to the attention of the American paleontologists Kenneth Carpenter and Virginia Tidwell, while urging them to describe it. They brought the skull to the Denver Museum of Natural History, where they further prepared it and made a reconstruction of it based on casts of the individual bones, with the skulls of Giraffatitan and Camarasaurus acting as templates for the missing bones.

In 1998 Carpenter and Tidwell described the Felch Quarry skull, and formally assigned it to Brachiosaurus sp. (of uncertain species), since it is impossible to determine whether it belonged to the species B. altithorax itself (as there is no overlapping material between the two specimens). They based the skull's assignment to Brachiosaurus on its similarity to that of B. brancai, later known as Giraffatitan. In 2019, American paleontologists Michael D. D'Emic and Matthew T. Carrano re-examined the Felch Quarry skull after having it further prepared and CT-scanned (while consulting historical illustrations that showed earlier states of the bones), and concluded that a quadrate bone and dentary tooth considered part of the skull by Carpenter and Tidwell did not belong to it. The quadrate is too large to articulate with the squamosal, is preserved differently from the other bones, and was found several meters away. The tooth does not resemble those within the jaws (as revealed by CT data), is larger, and was therefore assigned to Camarasaurus sp. (other teeth assignable to that genus are known from the quarry). They also found it most parsimonious to assign the skull to B. altithorax itself rather than an unspecified species, as there is no evidence of other brachiosaurid taxa in the Morrison Formation (and adding this and other possible elements to a phylogenetic analysis did not change the position of B. altithorax).

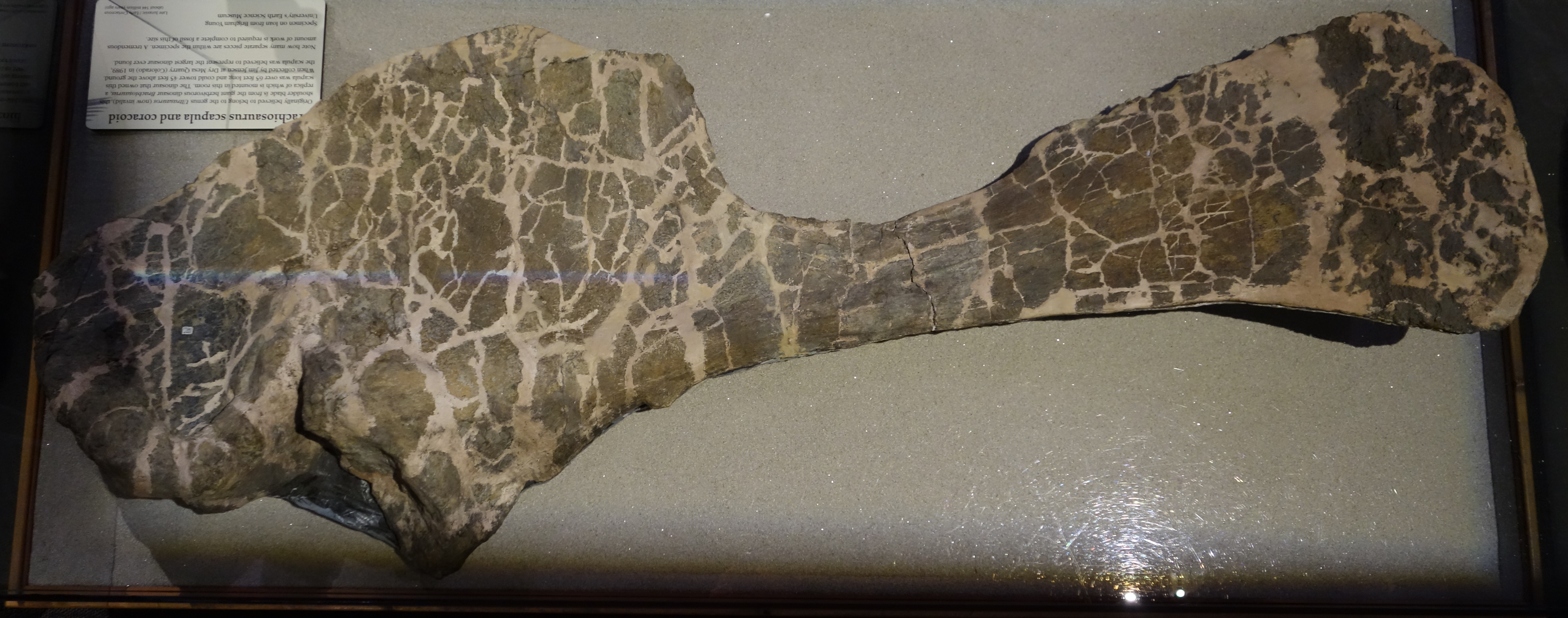
Scapulocoracoid BYU 9462 has been seen as a possible Brachiosaurus bone; it was originally assigned to Ultrasauros (now a junior synonym of Supersaurus), Museum of Ancient Life

A shoulder blade with coracoid from Dry Mesa Quarry, Colorado, is one of the specimens at the center of the Supersaurus/Ultrasauros issue of the 1980s and 1990s. In 1985 James A. Jensen described disarticulated sauropod remains from the quarry as belonging to several exceptionally large taxa, including the new genera Supersaurus and Ultrasaurus, the latter renamed Ultrasauros shortly thereafter because another sauropod had already received the name. Later study showed that the "ultrasaur" material mostly belonged to Supersaurus, though the shoulder blade did not. Because the holotype of Ultrasauros, a dorsal vertebra, was one of the specimens that was actually from Supersaurus, the name Ultrasauros is a synonym of Supersaurus. The shoulder blade, specimen BYU 9462 (previously BYU 5001), was in 1996 assigned to a Brachiosaurus sp. (of uncertain species) by Brian Curtice and colleagues; in 2009 Michael P. Taylor concluded that it could not be referred to B. altithorax. The Dry Mesa "ultrasaur" was not as large as had been thought; the dimensions of the shoulder's coracoid bone indicate that the animal was smaller than Riggs's original specimen of Brachiosaurus.

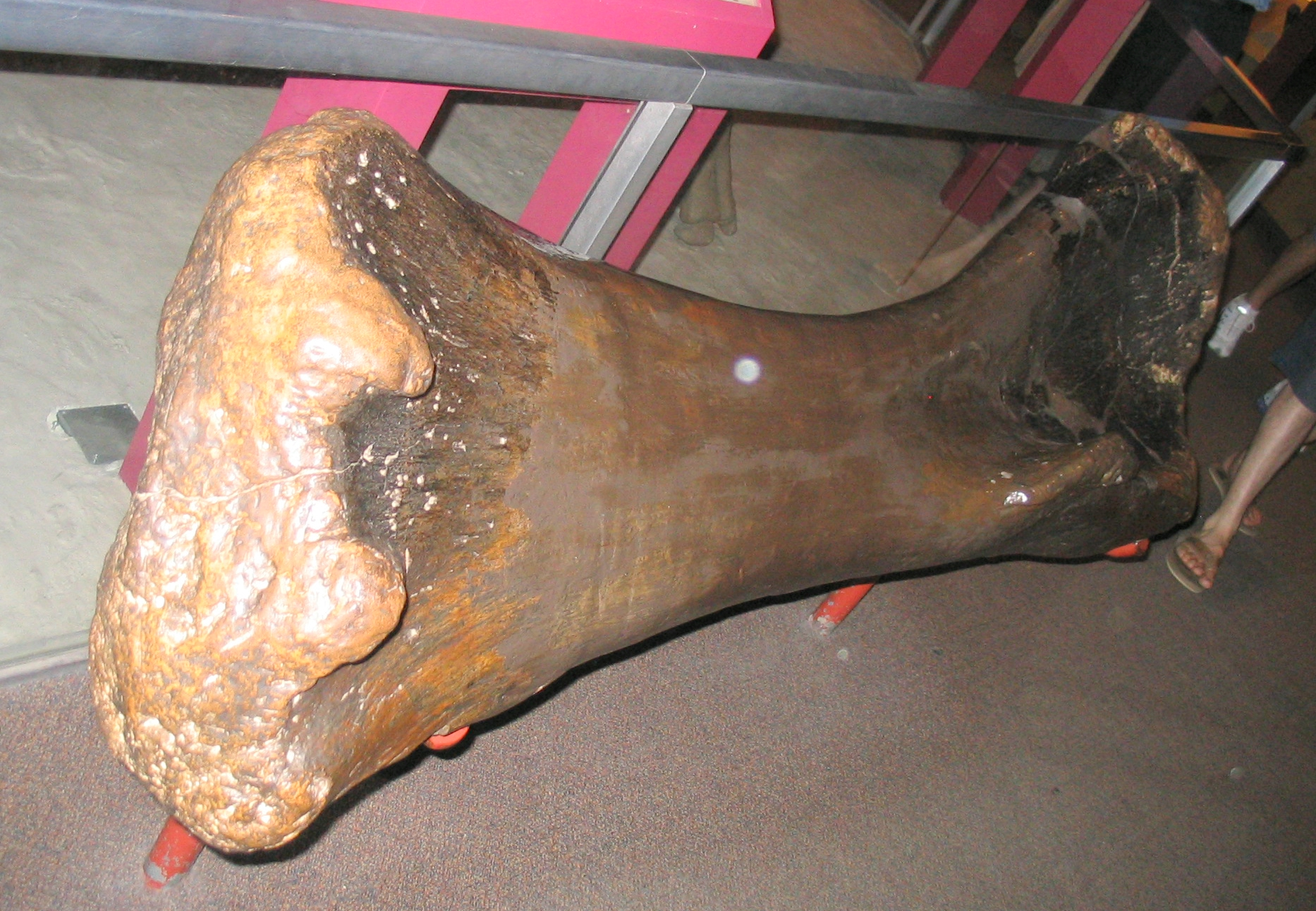
Referred forelimb bone (humerus) from Potter Creek, USNM 21903

Several additional specimens were briefly described by Jensen in 1987. One of these finds, the humerus USNM 21903, was discovered in ca. 1943 by uranium prospectors Vivian and Daniel Jones in the Potter Creek Quarry in western Colorado, and donated to the Smithsonian Institution. Originally, this humerus was part of a poorly preserved partial skeleton that was not collected. According to Taylor in 2009, it is not clearly referable to Brachiosaurus despite its large size of 2.13 meters (6 ft 11 3/4 in). Jensen himself worked at the Potter Creek site in 1971 and 1975, excavating the disarticulated specimen BYU 4744, which contains a mid-dorsal vertebra, an incomplete left ilium, a left radius and a right metacarpal. According to Taylor in 2009, this specimen can be confidently referred to B. altithorax, as far as it is overlapping with its type specimen. Jensen further mentioned a specimen discovered near Jensen, Utah, that includes a rib 2.75 meters (9 ft 1/4 in) in length, an anterior cervical vertebra, part of a scapula, and a coracoid, although he did not provide a description. In 2001, Curtice and Stadtman ascribed two articulated dorsal vertebrae (specimen BYU 13023) from Dry Mesa Quarry to Brachiosaurus. Taylor, in 2009, noted that these vertebrae are markedly shorter than those of the B. altithorax holotype, although otherwise being similar.

In 2012, José Carballido and colleagues reported a nearly complete postcranial skeleton of a small juvenile approximately 2 meters (6 ft 7 in) in length. This specimen, nicknamed "Toni" and cataloged as SMA 0009, stems from the Morrison Formation of the Bighorn Basin in north-central Wyoming. Although originally thought to belong to a diplodocid, it was later reinterpreted as a brachiosaurid, probably belonging to B. altithorax. In 2018, the largest sauropod foot ever found was reported from the Black Hills of Weston County, Wyoming. The femur is not preserved but comparisons suggest that it was about two percent longer than that of the B. altithorax holotype. Though possibly belonging to Brachiosaurus, the authors cautiously classified it as an indeterminate brachiosaurid. However, the assignment of these two specimens to their respective clades was later questioned by D'Emic and Carrano in 2019. They considered the referral of "Toni" to B. altithorax be based on mistaken interpretations of the species' unique features or of the specimen itself, and deemed it worthy of further study. Analyzing photos of the large foot, D'Emic and Carrano noted that the only feature that allowed referral to Brachiosauridae may have been influenced by damage to the bone it was found on, but did state that "general similarities" with Sonorasaurus and Giraffatitan suggested brachiosaurid affinities, but this, the authors stated, would be confirmed only through further study.

=== Formerly assigned species ===
==== Brachiosaurus brancai and Brachiosaurus fraasi ====
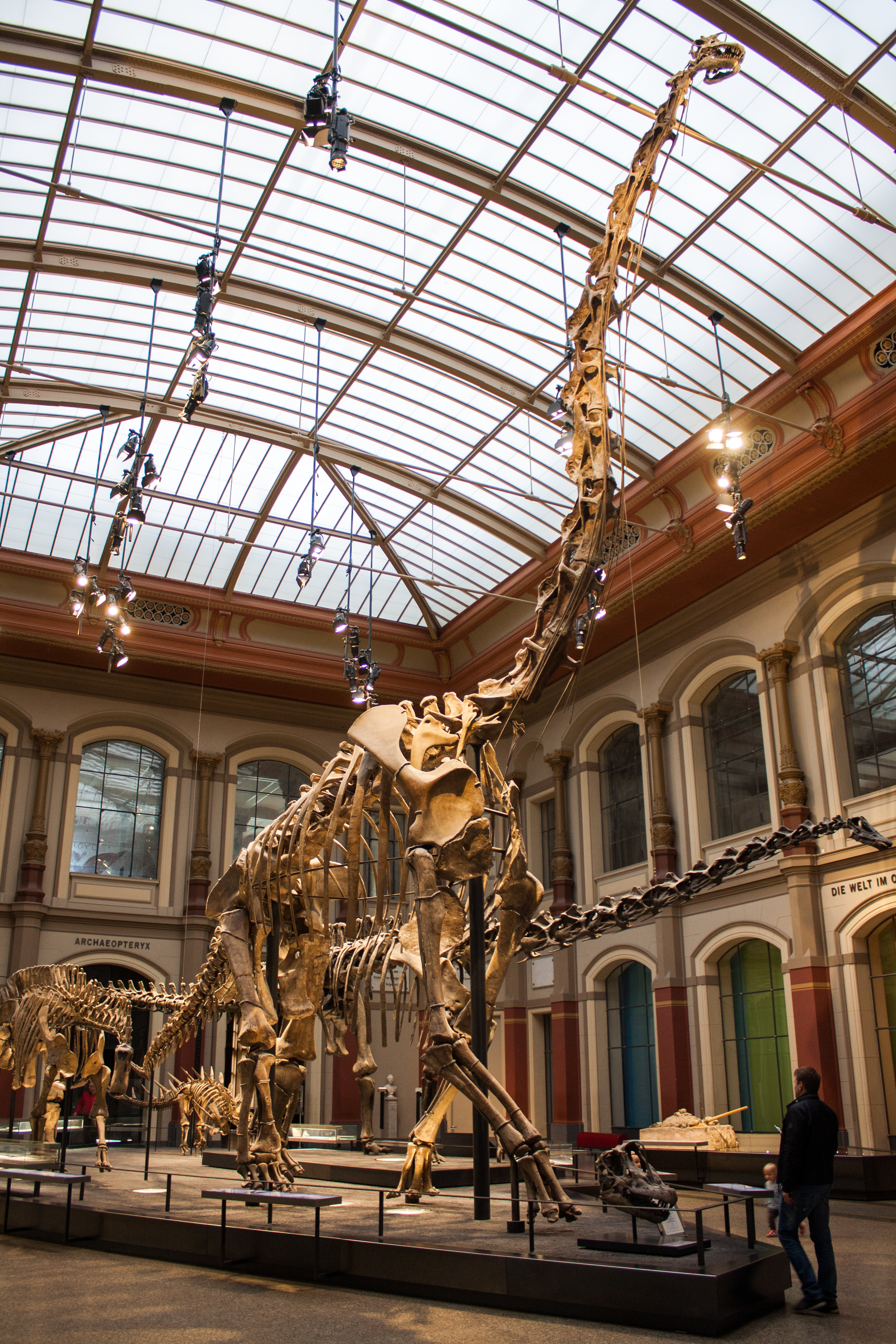
Skeleton of Giraffatitan, formerly B. brancai, Natural History Museum, Berlin

Between 1909 and 1912, large-scale paleontological expeditions in German East Africa unearthed a considerable amount of brachiosaurid material from the Tendaguru Formation. In 1914, German paleontologist Werner Janensch listed differences and commonalities between these fossils and B. altithorax, concluding they could be referred to the genus Brachiosaurus. From this material Janensch named two species: Brachiosaurus brancai for the larger and more complete taxon, and Brachiosaurus fraasi for the smaller and more poorly known species. In three further publications in 1929, 1950 and 1961, Janensch compared the species in more detail, listing thirteen shared characters between Brachiosaurus brancai (which he now considered to include B. fraasi) and B. altithorax. Taylor, in 2009, considered only four of these characters as valid; six pertain to groups more inclusive than the Brachiosauridae, and the rest are either difficult to assess or refer to material that is not Brachiosaurus.

There was ample material referred to B. brancai in the collections of the Museum für Naturkunde in Berlin, some of which was destroyed during World War II. Other material was transferred to other institutions throughout Germany, some of which was also destroyed. Additional material was collected by the British Museum of Natural History's Tendaguru expedition, including a nearly complete skeleton (BMNH R5937) collected by F.W.H. Migeod in 1930. This specimen is now believed to represent a new species, awaiting description.

Janensch based his description of B. brancai on "Skelett S" (skeleton S) from Tendaguru, but later realized that it comprised two partial individuals: S I and S II. He at first did not designate them as a syntype series, but in 1935 made S I (presently MB.R.2180) the lectotype. Taylor in 2009, unaware of this action, proposed the larger and more complete S II (MB.R.2181) as the lectotype. It includes, among other bones, several dorsal vertebrae, the left scapula, both coracoids, the breastbones, both humeri, both ulnae and radii (lower arm bones), a right hand, a partial left hand, both hip bones and the right femur, tibia and fibula (shank bones). Later in 2011, Taylor realized that Janensch had designated the smaller skeleton S I as the lectotype in 1935.

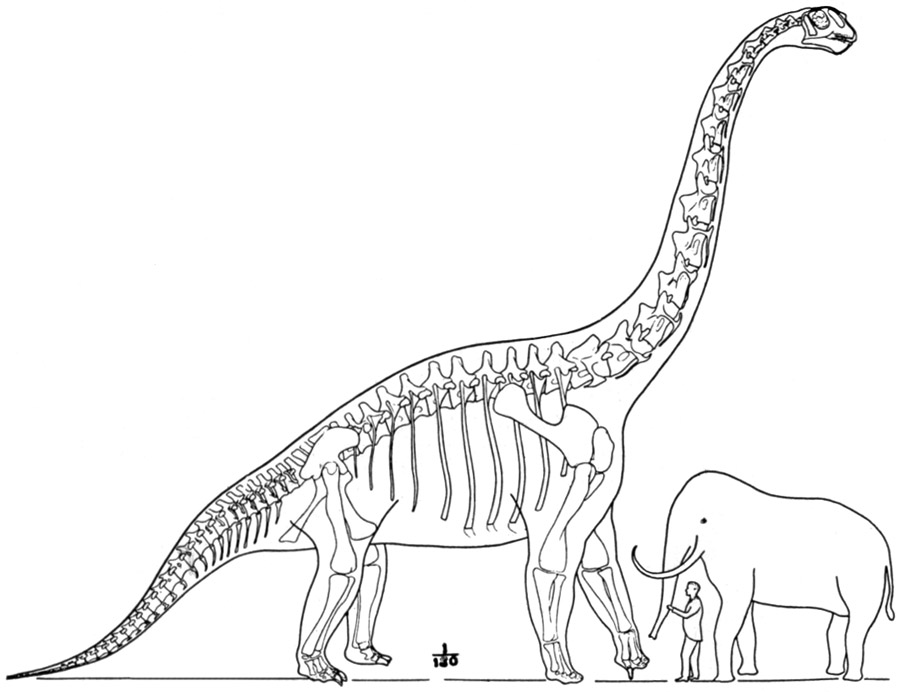
Diagram incorporating bones of both Brachiosaurus and Giraffatitan, by William Diller Matthew, 1915

In 1988 Gregory S. Paul published a new reconstruction of the skeleton of B. brancai, highlighting differences in proportion between it and B. altithorax. Chief among them was a distinction in the way the trunk vertebrae vary: they are fairly uniform in length in the African material, but vary widely in B. altithorax. Paul believed that the limb and girdle elements of both species were very similar, and therefore suggested they be separated not at genus, but only at subgenus level, as Brachiosaurus (Brachiosaurus) altithorax and Brachiosaurus (Giraffatitan) brancai. Giraffatitan was raised to full genus level by George Olshevsky in 1991, while referring to the vertebral variation. Between 1991 and 2009, the name Giraffatitan was almost completely disregarded by other researchers.

A detailed 2009 study by Taylor of all material, including the limb and girdle bones, found that there are significant divergences between B. altithorax and the Tendaguru material in all elements known from both species. Taylor found twenty-six distinct osteological (bone-based) characters, a larger difference than between Diplodocus and Barosaurus, and therefore argued that the African material should indeed be placed in its own genus (Giraffatitan) as Giraffatitan brancai. An important contrast between the two genera is their overall body shape, with Brachiosaurus having a 23 percent longer dorsal vertebral series and a 20 to 25 percent longer and also taller tail. The split was rejected by Daniel Chure in 2010, but from 2012 onward most studies recognized the name Giraffatitan.

==== Brachiosaurus atalaiensis ====
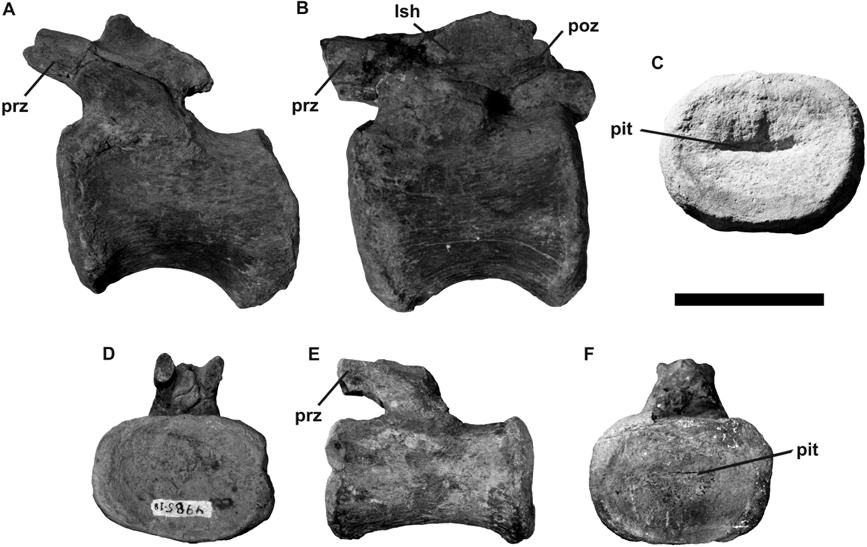
Middle caudal vertebrae of Lusotitan, formerly B. atalaiensis

In 1947, at Atalaia in Portugal, brachiosaurid remains were found in layers dating from the Tithonian. Albert-Félix de Lapparent and Georges Zbyszewski named them as the species Brachiosaurus atalaiensis in 1957. Its referral to Brachiosaurus was doubted in the 2004 edition of The Dinosauria by Paul Upchurch, Barret, and Peter Dodson who listed it as an as yet unnamed brachiosaurid genus. Shortly before the publication of the 2004 book, the species had been placed in its own genus Lusotitan by Miguel Telles Antunes and Octávio Mateus in 2003. De Lapparent and Zbyszewski had described a series of remains but did not designate a type specimen. Antunes and Mateus selected a partial postcranial skeleton (MIGM 4978, 4798, 4801–4810, 4938, 4944, 4950, 4952, 4958, 4964–4966, 4981–4982, 4985, 8807, 8793–87934) as the lectotype; this specimen includes twenty-eight vertebrae, chevrons, ribs, a possible shoulder blade, humeri, forearm bones, partial left pelvis, lower leg bones, and part of the right ankle. The low neural spines, the prominent deltopectoral crest of the humerus (a muscle attachment site on the upper arm bone), the elongated humerus (very long and slender), and the long axis of the ilium tilting upward indicate that Lusotitan is a brachiosaurid, which was confirmed by some later studies, such as an analysis in 2013.

==== Brachiosaurus nougaredi ====
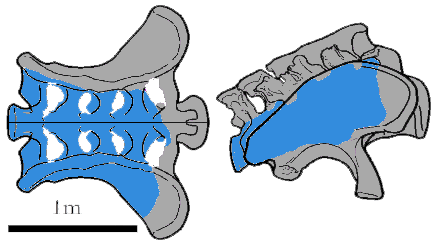
Diagram showing preserved parts of the B. nougaredi sacrum in blue

In 1958 French petroleum geologist F. Nougarède reported to have discovered fragmentary brachiosaurid remains in eastern Algeria, in the Sahara Desert. Based on these, Albert-Félix de Lapparent described and named the species Brachiosaurus nougaredi in 1960. He indicated the discovery locality as being in the Late Jurassic-age Taouratine Series. He assigned the rocks to this age in part because of the presumed presence of Brachiosaurus. A more recent review placed it in the "Continental intercalaire", which is considered to belong to the Albian age of the late Early Cretaceous, significantly younger.

The type material moved to Paris consisted of a sacrum, weathered out at the desert surface, and some of the left metacarpals and phalanges. Found at the discovery site but not collected, were partial bones of the left forearm, wrist bones, a right shin bone, and fragments that may have come from metatarsals.

B. nougaredi was in 2004 considered to represent a distinct, unnamed brachiosaurid genus, but a 2013 analysis by Philip D. Mannion and colleagues found that the remains possibly belong to more than one species, as they were collected far apart. The metacarpals were concluded to belong to some indeterminate titanosauriform. The sacrum was reported lost in 2013. It was not analyzed and provisionally considered to represent an indeterminate sauropod, until such time that it could be relocated in the collections of the Muséum national d'histoire naturelle. Only four out of the five sacral vertebrae are preserved. The total original length was in 1960 estimated at 1.3 meters (4 ft 3 in), compared to 0.91 meters (3 ft 0 in) with B. altithorax. This would make it larger than any other sauropod sacrum ever found, except those of Argentinosaurus and Apatosaurus.

== Description ==
=== Size ===
Size compared to a human

Most estimates of Brachiosaurus altithorax's size are based on the related brachiosaurid Giraffatitan (formerly known as B. brancai), which is known from much more complete material than Brachiosaurus. The two species are the largest brachiosaurids of which relatively extensive remains have been discovered. There is another element of uncertainty for the North American Brachiosaurus because the type (and most complete) specimen appears to represent a subadult, as indicated by the unfused suture between the coracoid, a bone of the shoulder girdle that forms part of the shoulder joint, and the scapula (shoulder blade). Over the years, the mass of the holotype specimen has been estimated within the range of 28.3–46.9 metric tons (31.2–51.7 short tons). Benson et al. suggested a maximum body mass of 56 and 58 metric tons (62 and 64 short tons), but these estimates were questioned due to a very large error range and lack of precision. The length of Brachiosaurus has been estimated at 20–22 meters (66–72 ft) and 18 meters (59 ft), and its height at 9.4 meters (30 3/4 ft) and 12–13 meters (39–43 ft).

While the limb bones of the most complete Giraffatitan skeleton (MB.R.2181) were very similar in size to those of the Brachiosaurus type specimen, the former was somewhat lighter than the Brachiosaurus specimen given its proportional differences. In studies including estimates for both genera, Giraffatitan was estimated at 31.5 metric tons (34.7 short tons), 39.5 metric tons (43.5 short tons), 38.0 metric tons (41.9 short tons), 23.3 metric tons (25.7 short tons), and 34.0 metric tons (37.5 short tons). As with the main Brachiosaurus specimen, Giraffatitan specimen MB.R.2181 likely does not reflect the maximum size of the genus, as a fibula (specimen HM XV2) is thirteen percent longer than that of MB.R.2181.

=== General build ===
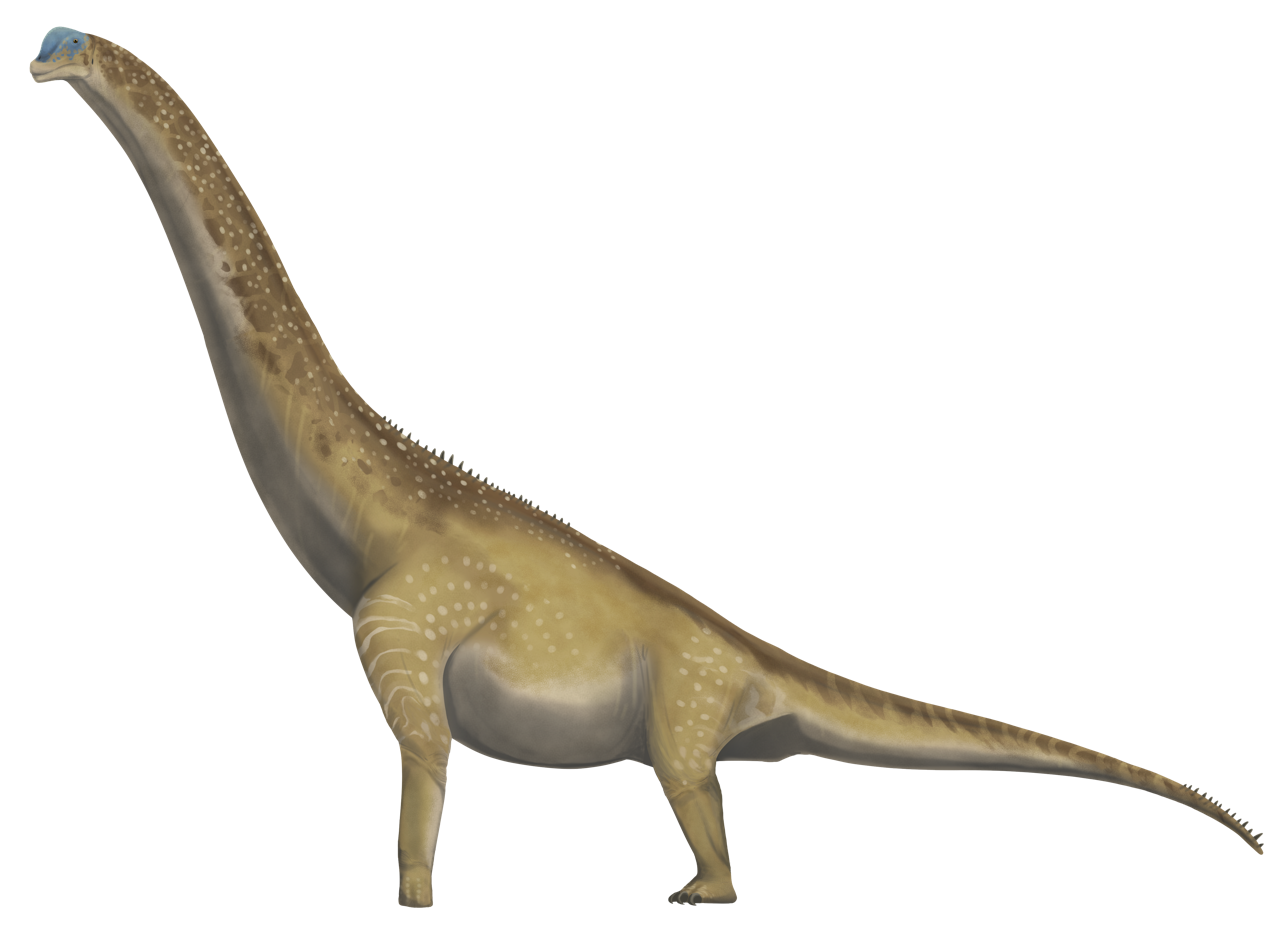
Life restoration

Like all sauropod dinosaurs, Brachiosaurus was a quadruped with a small skull, a long neck, a large trunk with a high-ellipsoid cross section, a long, muscular tail and slender, columnar limbs. Large air sacs connected to the lung system were present in the neck and trunk, invading the vertebrae and ribs by bone resorption, greatly reducing the overall density of the body. The neck is not preserved in the holotype specimen, but was very long even by sauropod standards in the closely related Giraffatitan, consisting of thirteen elongated cervical (neck) vertebrae. The neck was held in a slight S-curve, with the lower and upper sections bent and a straight middle section. Brachiosaurus likely shared with Giraffatitan the very elongated neck ribs, which ran down the underside of the neck, overlapping several preceding vertebrae. These bony rods were attached to neck muscles at their ends, allowing these muscles to operate distal portions of the neck while themselves being located closer to the trunk, lightening the distal neck portions.

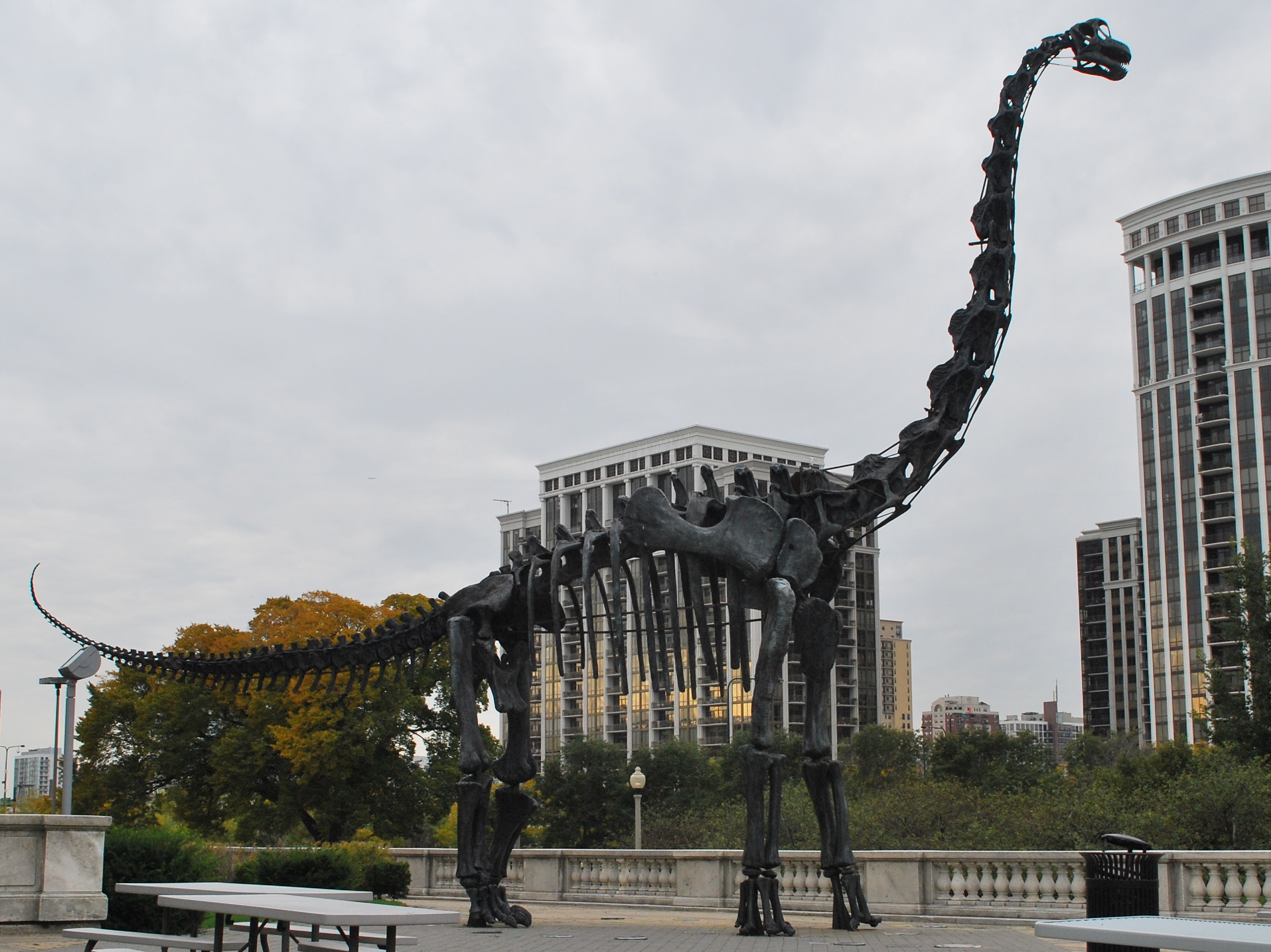
Replica skeleton outside the FMNH

Brachiosaurus and Giraffatitan probably had a small shoulder hump between the third and fifth dorsal (back) vertebra, where the sideward- and upward-directed vertebral processes were longer, providing additional surface for neck muscle attachment. The ribcage was deep compared to other sauropods. Though the humerus (upper arm bone) and femur (thigh bone) were roughly equal in length, the entire forelimb would have been longer than the hindlimb, as can be inferred from the elongated forearm and metacarpus of other brachiosaurids. This resulted in an inclined trunk with the shoulder much higher than the hips, and the neck exiting the trunk at a steep angle. The overall build of Brachiosaurus resembles a giraffe more than any other living animal. In contrast, most other sauropods had a shorter forelimb than hindlimb; the forelimb is especially short in contemporaneous diplodocoids.

Brachiosaurus differed in its body proportions from the closely related Giraffatitan. The trunk was about 25 to 30 percent longer, resulting in a dorsal vertebral column longer than the humerus. Only a single complete caudal (tail) vertebra has been discovered, but its great height suggests that the tail was larger than in Giraffatitan. This vertebra had a much greater area for ligament attachment due to a broadened neural spine, indicating that the tail was also longer than in Giraffatitan, possibly by 20 to 25 percent. In 1988, paleontologist Gregory S. Paul suggested that the neck of Brachiosaurus was shorter than that of Giraffatitan, but in 2009, paleontologist Mike P. Taylor pointed out that two cervical vertebrae likely belonging to Brachiosaurus had identical proportions. Unlike Giraffatitan and other sauropods, which had vertically oriented forelimbs, the arms of Brachiosaurus appear to have been slightly sprawled at the shoulder joints, as indicated by the sideward orientation of the joint surfaces of the coracoids. The humerus was less slender than that of Giraffatitan, while the femur had similar proportions. This might indicate that the forelimbs of Brachiosaurus supported a greater fraction of the body weight than is the case for Giraffatitan.

=== Postcranial skeleton ===
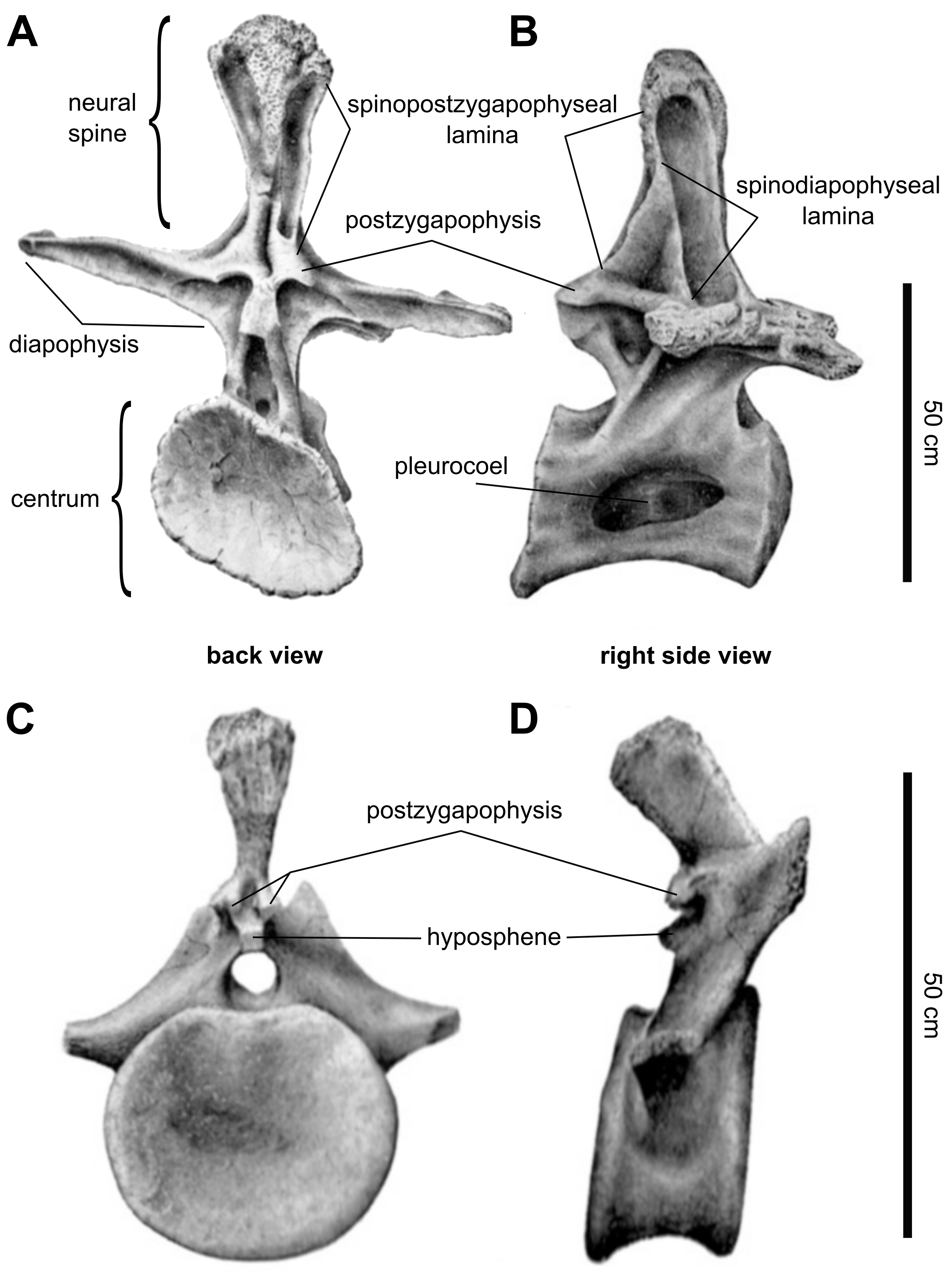
Vertebral anatomy of the holotype skeleton. Top: sixth dorsal vertebra in back (A) and right side view (B). Bottom: second caudal vertebra in back (C) and side view (D)

Though the vertebral column of the trunk or torso is incompletely known, the back of Brachiosaurus most likely comprised twelve dorsal vertebrae; this can be inferred from the complete dorsal vertebral column preserved in an unnamed brachiosaurid specimen, BMNH R5937. Vertebrae of the front part of the dorsal column were slightly taller but much longer than those of the back part. This is in contrast to Giraffatitan, where the vertebrae at the front part were much taller but only slightly longer. The centra (vertebral bodies), the lower part of the vertebrae, were more elongated and roughly circular in cross section, while those of Giraffatitan were broader than tall. The foramina (small openings) on the sides of the centra, which allowed for the intrusion of air sacs, were larger than in Giraffatitan. The diapophyses (large projections extending sideways from the neural arch of the vertebrae) were horizontal, while those of Giraffatitan were inclined upward. At their ends, these projections articulated with the ribs; the articular surface was not distinctly triangular as in Giraffatitan. In side view, the upward-projecting neural spines stood vertically and were twice as wide at the base than at the top; those of Giraffatitan tilted backward and did not broaden at their base. When seen in front or back view, the neural spines widened toward their tops.

In Brachiosaurus, this widening occurred gradually, resulting in a paddle-like shape, while in Giraffatitan the widening occurred abruptly and only in the uppermost portion. At both their front and back sides, the neural spines featured large, triangular and rugose surfaces, which in Giraffatitan were semicircular and much smaller. The various vertebral processes were connected by thin sheets or ridges of bone, which are called laminae. Brachiosaurus lacked postspinal laminae, which were present in Giraffatitan, running down the back side of the neural spines. The spinodiapophyseal laminae, which stretched from the neural spines to the diapophyses, were conflated with the spinopostzygapophyseal laminae, which stretched between the neural spines and the articular processes at the back of the vertebrae, and therefore terminated at mid-height of the neural spines. In Giraffatitan, both laminae were not conflated, and the spinodiapophyseal laminae reached up to the top of the neural spines. Brachiosaurus is further distinguished from Giraffatitan in lacking three details in the laminae of the dorsal vertebrae that are unique to the latter genus.

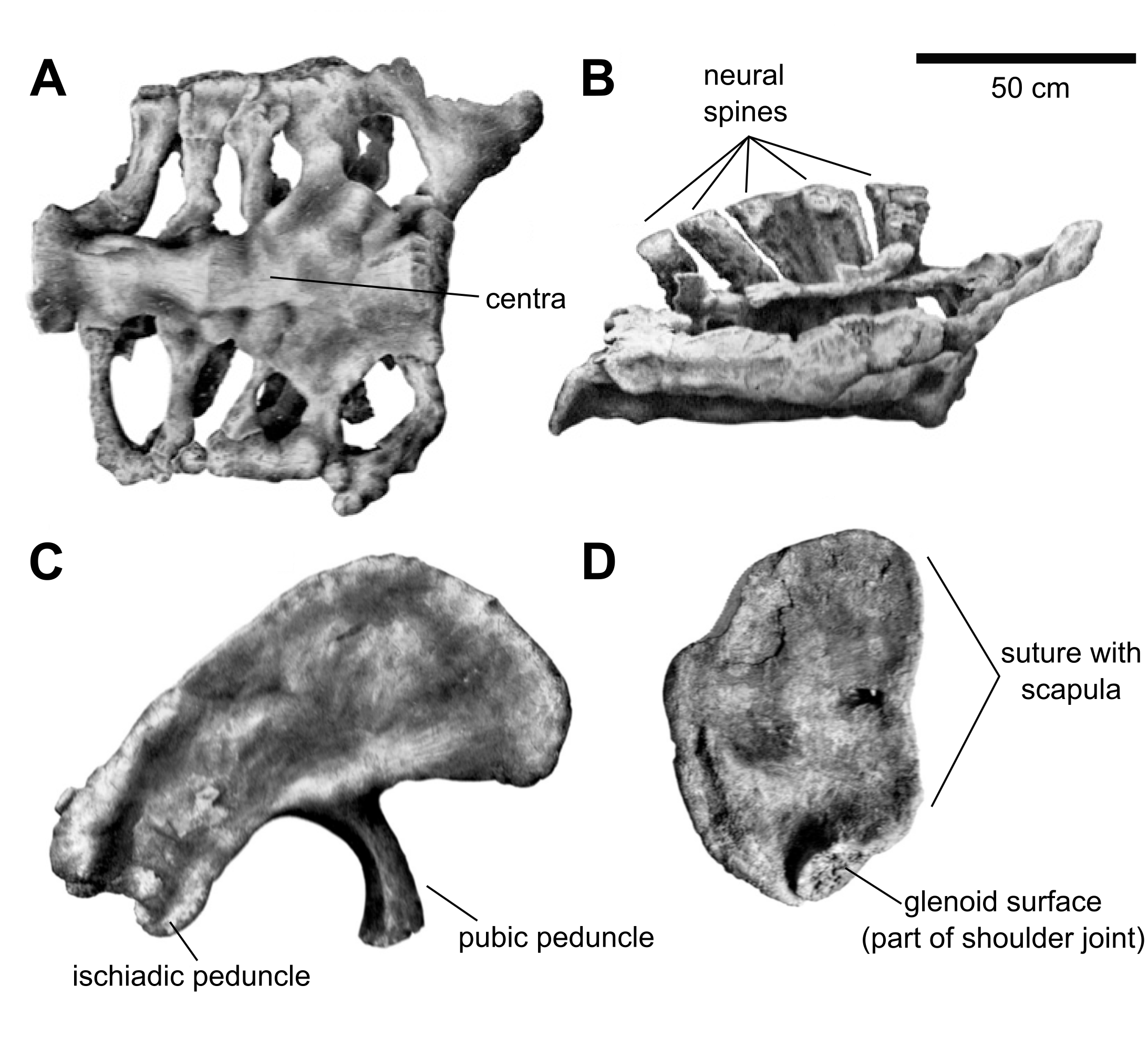
Anatomy of the sacrum, ilium, and coracoid. Top: Sacrum in bottom (A) and right side view (B). Bottom: Right ilium in side view (C) and left coracoid in side view (D)

Air sacs not only invaded the vertebrae but also the ribs. In Brachiosaurus, the air sacs invaded through a small opening on the front side of the rib shafts, while in Giraffatitan openings were present on both the front and back sides of the tuberculum, a bony projection articulating with the diapophyses of the vertebrae. Paul, in 1988, stated that the ribs of Brachiosaurus were longer than in Giraffatitan, which was questioned by Taylor in 2009. Behind the dorsal vertebral column, the sacrum consisted of five co-ossified sacral vertebrae. As in Giraffatitan, the sacrum was proportionally broad and featured very short neural spines. Poor preservation of the sacral material in Giraffatitan precludes detailed comparisons between both genera. Of the tail, only the second caudal vertebra is well preserved.

As in Giraffatitan, this vertebra was slightly amphicoelous (concave on both ends), lacked openings on the sides, and had a short neural spine that was rectangular and tilted backward. In contrast to the second caudal vertebra of Giraffatitan, that of Brachiosaurus had a proportionally taller neural arch, making the vertebra about thirty percent taller. The centrum lacked depressions on its sides, in contrast to Giraffatitan. In front or back view, the neural spine broadened toward its tip to approximately three times its minimum width, but no broadening is apparent in Giraffatitan. The neural spines were also inclined backward by about 30 degrees, more than in Giraffatitan (20 degrees). The caudal ribs projected laterally and were not tilted backward as in Giraffatitan. The articular facets of the articular processes at the back of the vertebra were directed downward, while those of Giraffatitan faced more toward the sides. Besides the articular processes, the hyposphene-hypantrum articulation formed an additional articulation between vertebrae, making the vertebral column more rigid; in Brachiosaurus, the hyposphene was much more pronounced than in Giraffatitan.

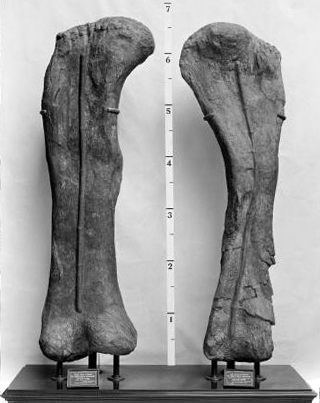
Femur (left) and humerus of the holotype

The coracoid was semicircular and taller than broad. Differences from Giraffatitan are related to its shape in side view, including the straighter suture with the scapula. Moreover, the articular surface that forms part of the shoulder joint was thicker and directed more sideward than in Giraffatitan and other sauropods, possibly indicating a more sprawled forelimb. The humerus, as preserved, measures 204 centimeters (80 1/2 in) in length, though part of its lower end was lost to erosion; its original length is estimated at 216 centimeters (85 in). This bone was more slender in Brachiosaurus than in most other sauropods, measuring only 28.5 centimeters (11 1/4 in) in width at its narrowest part. It was, however, more robust than that of Giraffatitan, being about ten percent broader at the upper and lower ends. At its upper end, it featured a low bulge visible in side view, which is absent in Giraffatitan.

Distinguishing features can also be found in the ilium of the pelvis. In Brachiosaurus, the ischiadic peduncle, a downward projecting extension connecting to the ischium, reaches farther downward than in Giraffatitan. While the latter genus had a sharp notch between the ischiadic peduncle and the back portion of the ilium, this notch is more rounded in Brachiosaurus. On the upper surface of the hind part of the ilium, Brachiosaurus had a pronounced tubercle that is absent in other sauropods. Of the hindlimb, the femur was very similar to that of Giraffatitan although slightly more robust, and measured 203 centimeters (80 in) long. As in Giraffatitan, it was strongly elliptical in cross section, being more than twice as wide in front or back view than in side view. The fourth trochanter, a prominent bulge on the back side of the femoral shaft, was more prominent and located further downward. This bulge served as anchor point for the most important locomotory muscle, the caudofemoralis, which was situated in the tail and pulled the upper thigh backward when contracted. At the lower end of the femur, the pair of condyles did not extend backward as strongly as in Giraffatitan; the two condyles were similar in width in Brachiosaurus but unequal in Giraffatitan.

=== Skull ===
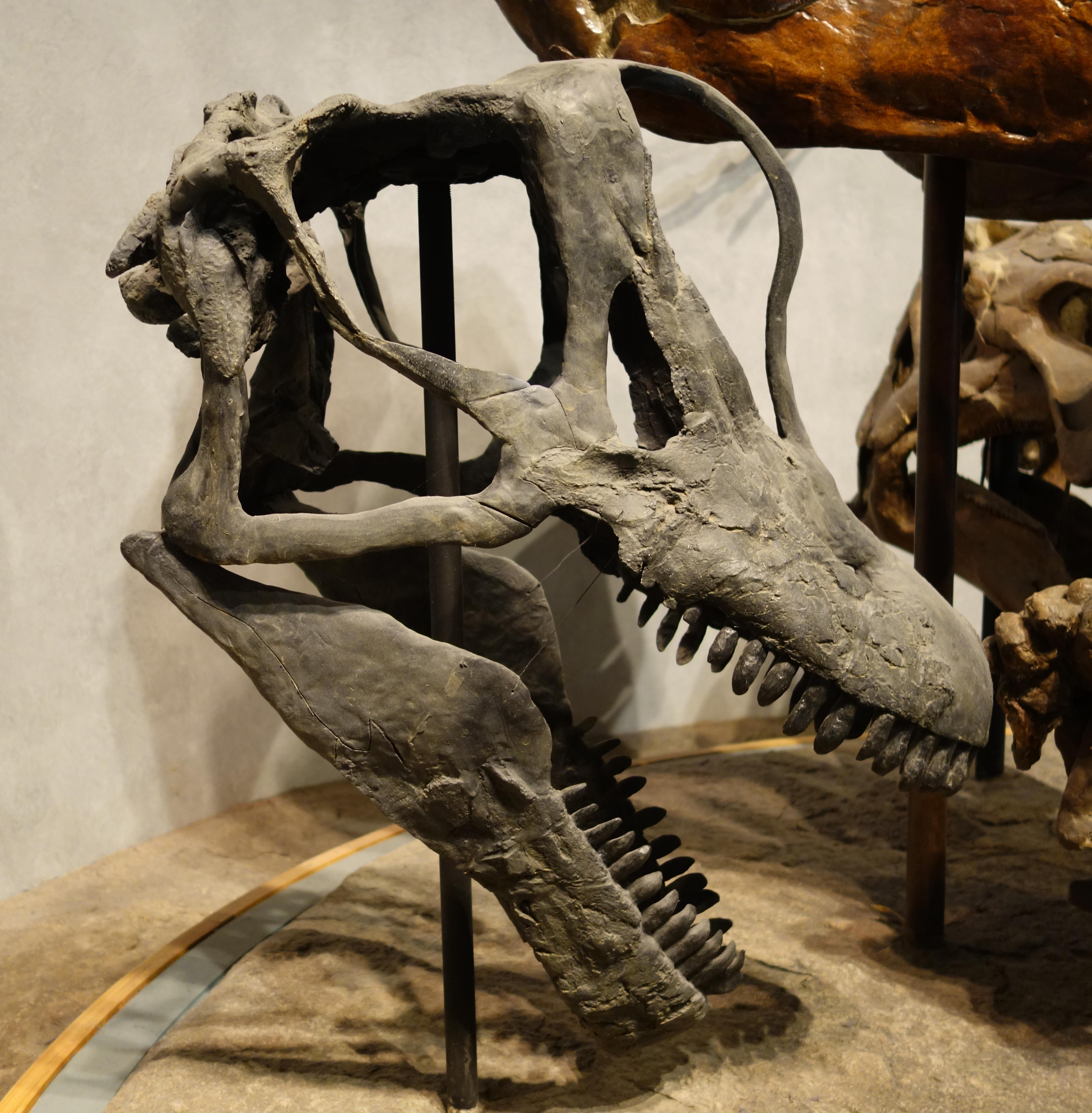
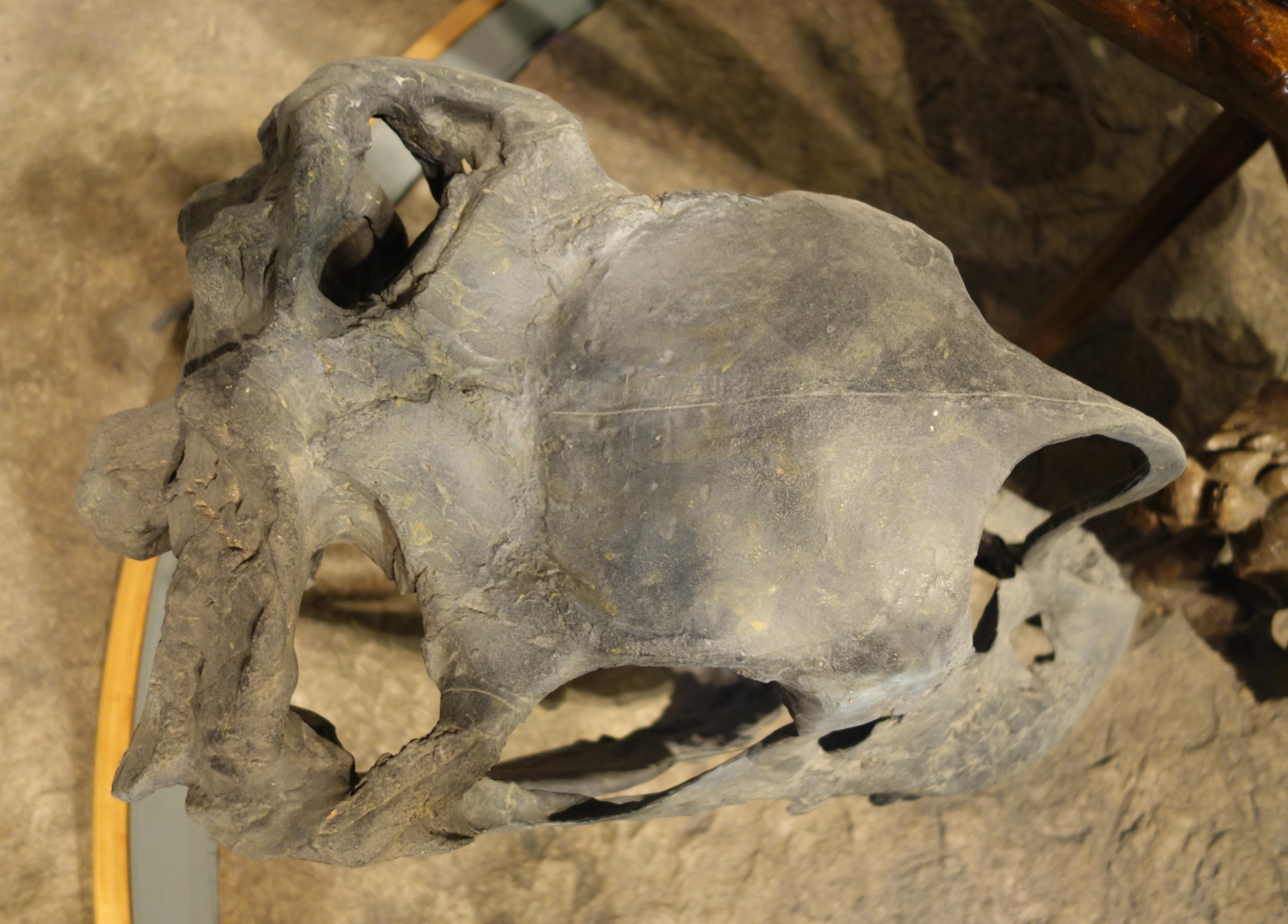
Reconstruction of the Felch Quarry Brachiosaurus skull, Denver Museum of Nature & Science

As reconstructed by Carpenter and Tidwell, the assigned Felch Quarry skull was about 81 centimeters (32 in) long from the occipital condyle at the back of the skull to the front of the premaxillae (the front bones of the upper jaw), making it the largest sauropod skull from the Morrison Formation. D'Emic and Carrano instead estimated the skull to have been 70 centimeters (27 1/2 in) long, and if proportionally similar to that of Giraffatitan, about 55 centimeters (21 1/2 in) tall, and 35 centimeters (14 in) wide. Overall, the skull was tall as in Giraffatitan, with a snout that was long (about 36 percent of the skull length according to Carpenter and Tidwell) in front of the nasal bar between the nostrils, typical of brachiosaurids. The snout was somewhat blunt when seen from above (as in Giraffatitan), and since it was set at an angle relative to the rest of the skull, gave the impression of pointing downward.

The dorsal and lateral temporal fenestrae (openings at the upper rear and sides of the skull) were large, perhaps due to the force imparted there by the massive jaw adductor musculature. The frontal bones on top of the skull were short and wide (similar to Giraffatitan), fused and connected by a suture to the parietal bones, which were also fused together. The surface of the parietals between the dorsal fenestrae was wider than that of Giraffatitan, but narrower than that of Camarasaurus. The skull differed from that of Giraffatitan in its U-shaped (instead of W-shaped) suture between frontal and nasal bones, a shape which appears more pronounced by the frontal bones extending forward over the orbits (eye sockets). Similar to Giraffatitan, the neck of the occipital condyle was very long.

Diagram of the Felch Quarry skull, with known material in white

The premaxilla appears to have been longer than that of Camarasaurus, sloping more gradually toward the nasal bar, which created the very long snout. Brachiosaurus had a long and deep maxilla (the main bone of the upper jaw), which was thick along the margin where the alveoli (tooth sockets) were placed, thinning upward. The interdental plates of the maxilla were thin, fused, porous, and triangular. There were triangular nutrient foramina between the plates, each containing the tip of an erupting tooth. The narial fossa (depression) in front of the bony nostril was long, relatively shallow, and less developed than that of Giraffatitan. It contained a subnarial fenestra, which was much larger than those of Giraffatitan and Camarasaurus. The dentaries (the bones of the lower jaws that contained the teeth) were robust, though less than in Camarasaurus. The upper margin of the dentary was arched in profile, but not as much as in Camarasaurus. The interdental plates of the dentary were somewhat oval, with diamond shaped openings between them. The dentary had a Meckelian groove that was open until below the ninth alveolus, continuing thereafter as a shallow trough.

Each maxilla had space for fourteen or fifteen teeth, whereas Giraffatitan had eleven and Camarasaurus eight to ten. The maxillae contained replacement teeth that had rugose enamel, similar to Camarasaurus, but lacked the small denticles (serrations) along the edges. Since the maxilla was wider than that of Camarasaurus, Brachiosaurus would have had larger teeth. The replacement teeth in the premaxilla had crinkled enamel, and the most complete of these teeth did not have denticles. It was somewhat spatulate (spoon-shaped), and had a longitudinal ridge. Each dentary had space for about fourteen teeth. The maxillary tooth rows of Brachiosaurus and Giraffatitan ended well in front of the antorbital fenestra (the opening in front of the orbit), whereas they ended just in front of and below the fenestra in Camarasaurus and Shunosaurus. The teeth of Brachiosaurus exhibited a high degree of dental complexity relative to other sauropods.

== Classification ==
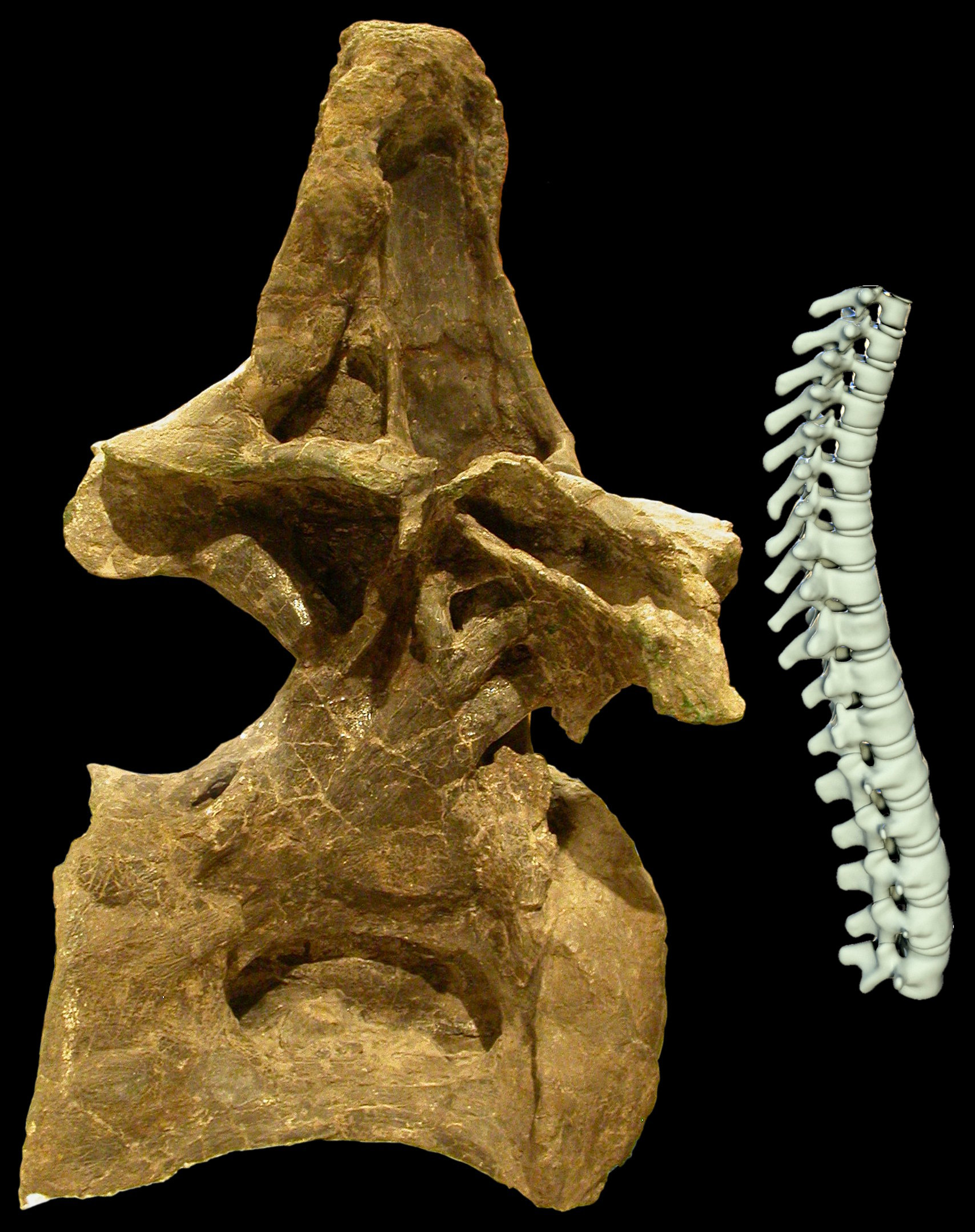
Fifth dorsal vertebra in front of the pelvis of the holotype, compared to the same region of a human vertebral column

Riggs, in his preliminary 1903 description of the not yet fully prepared holotype specimen, considered Brachiosaurus to be an obvious member of the Sauropoda. To determine the validity of the genus, he compared it to the previously named genera Camarasaurus, Apatosaurus, Atlantosaurus, and Amphicoelias, whose validity he questioned given the lack of overlapping fossil material. Because of the uncertain relationships of these genera, little could be said about the relationships of Brachiosaurus itself. In 1904, Riggs described the holotype material of Brachiosaurus in more detail, especially the vertebrae. He admitted that he originally had assumed a close affinity with Camarasaurus, but now decided that Brachiosaurus was more closely related to Haplocanthosaurus. Both genera shared a single line of neural spines on the back and had wide hips. Riggs considered the differences from other taxa significant enough to name a separate family, Brachiosauridae, of which Brachiosaurus is the namesake genus. According to Riggs, Haplocanthosaurus was the more primitive genus of the family while Brachiosaurus was a specialized form.

When describing Brachiosaurus brancai and B. fraasi in 1914, Janensch observed that the unique elongation of the humerus was shared by all three Brachiosaurus species as well as the British Pelorosaurus. He also noted this feature in Cetiosaurus, where it was not as strongly pronounced as in Brachiosaurus and Pelorosaurus. Janensch concluded that the four genera must have been closely related to each other, and in 1929 assigned them to a subfamily Brachiosaurinae within the family Bothrosauropodidae.

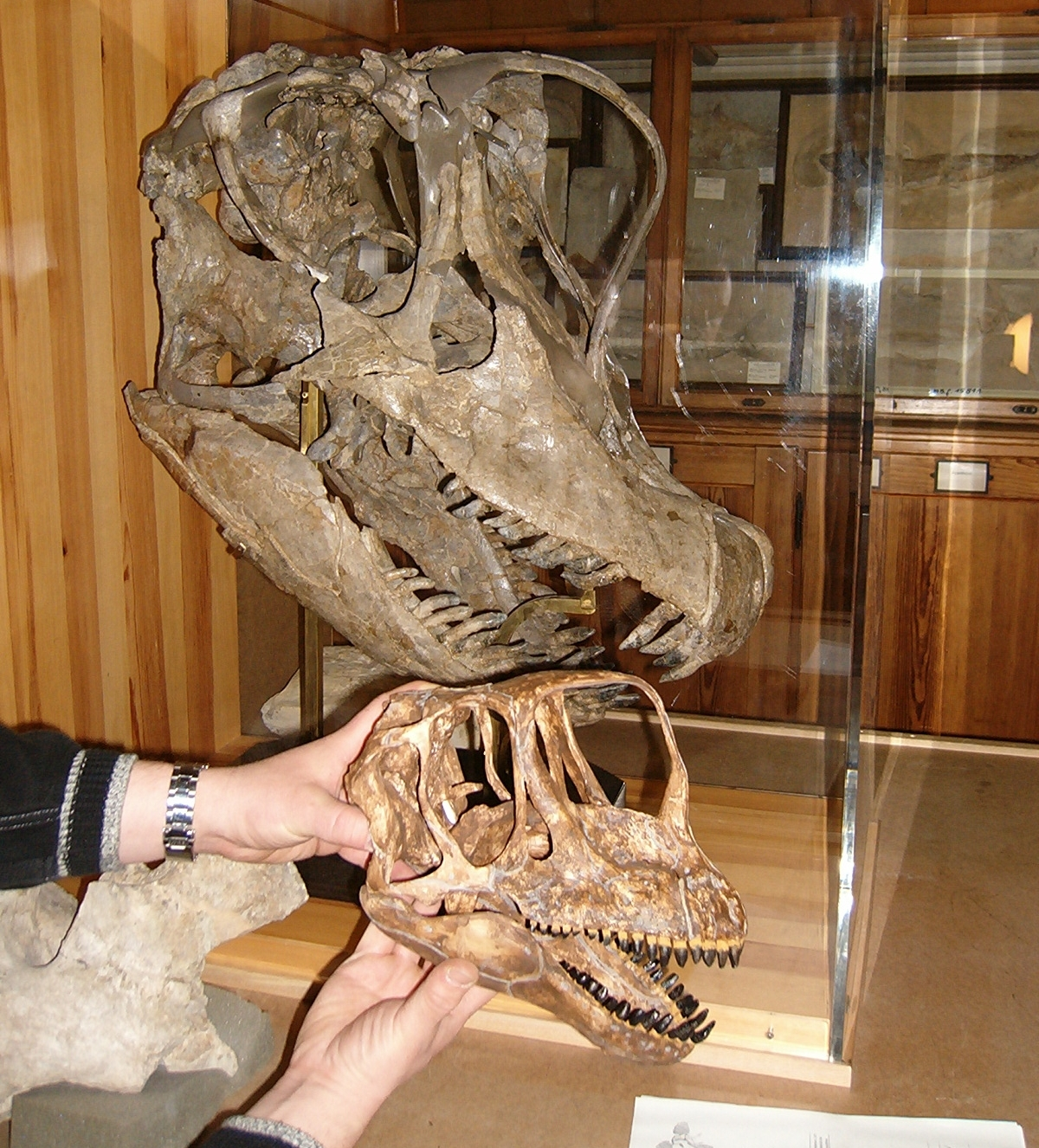
Skulls of the related Giraffatitan and Europasaurus

During the twentieth century, several sauropods were assigned to Brachiosauridae, including Astrodon, Bothriospondylus, Pelorosaurus, Pleurocoelus, and Ultrasauros. These assignments were often based on broad similarities rather than unambiguous synapomorphies, shared new traits, and most of these genera are currently regarded as dubious. In 1969, in a study by R.F. Kingham, B. altithorax, B. brancai and B. atalaiensis, along with many species now assigned to other genera, were placed in the genus Astrodon, creating an Astrodon altithorax. Kingham's views of brachiosaurid taxonomy have not been accepted by many other authors. Since the 1990s, computer-based cladistic analyses allow for postulating detailed hypotheses on the relationships between species, by calculating those trees that require the fewest evolutionary changes and thus are the most likely to be correct. Such cladistic analyses have cast doubt on the validity of the Brachiosauridae. In 1993, Leonardo Salgado suggested that they were an unnatural group into which all kinds of unrelated sauropods had been combined. In 1997, he published an analysis in which species traditionally considered brachiosaurids were subsequent offshoots of the stem of a larger grouping, the Titanosauriformes, and not a separate branch of their own. This study also pointed out that B. altithorax and B. brancai did not have any synapomorphies, so that there was no evidence to assume they were particularly closely related.

Many cladistic analyses have since suggested that at least some genera can be assigned to the Brachiosauridae, and that this group is a basal branch within the Titanosauriformes. The exact status of each potential brachiosaurid varies from study to study. For example, a 2010 study by Chure and colleagues recognized Abydosaurus as a brachiosaurid together with Brachiosaurus, which in this study included B. brancai. In 2009, Taylor noted multiple anatomical differences between the two Brachiosaurus species, and consequently moved B. brancai into its own genus, Giraffatitan. In contrast to earlier studies, Taylor treated both genera as distinct units in a cladistic analysis, finding them to be sister groups. Another 2010 analysis focusing on possible Asian brachiosaurid material found a clade including Abydosaurus, Brachiosaurus, Cedarosaurus, Giraffatitan, and Paluxysaurus, but not Qiaowanlong, the putative Asian brachiosaurid. Several subsequent analyses have found Brachiosaurus and Giraffatitan not to be sister groups, but instead located at different positions on the evolutionary tree. A 2012 study by D'Emic placed Giraffatitan in a more basal position, in an earlier branch, than Brachiosaurus, while a 2013 study by Philip Mannion and colleagues had it the other way around.

This cladogram follows that published by Michael D. D'Emic in 2012:

- Brachiosauridae
  - Europasaurus
  - - Giraffatitan
    - - Brachiosaurus
      - - Abydosaurus
        - Cedarosaurus
        - Venenosaurus

Cladistic analyses also allow scientists to determine which new traits the members of a group have in common, their synapomorphies. According to the 2009 study by Taylor, B. altithorax shares with other brachiosaurids the classic trait of having an upper arm bone that is at least nearly as long as the femur (ratio of humerus length to femur length of at least 0.9). Another shared character is the very flattened femur shaft, its transverse width being at least 1.85 times the width measured from front to rear.

== Paleobiology ==
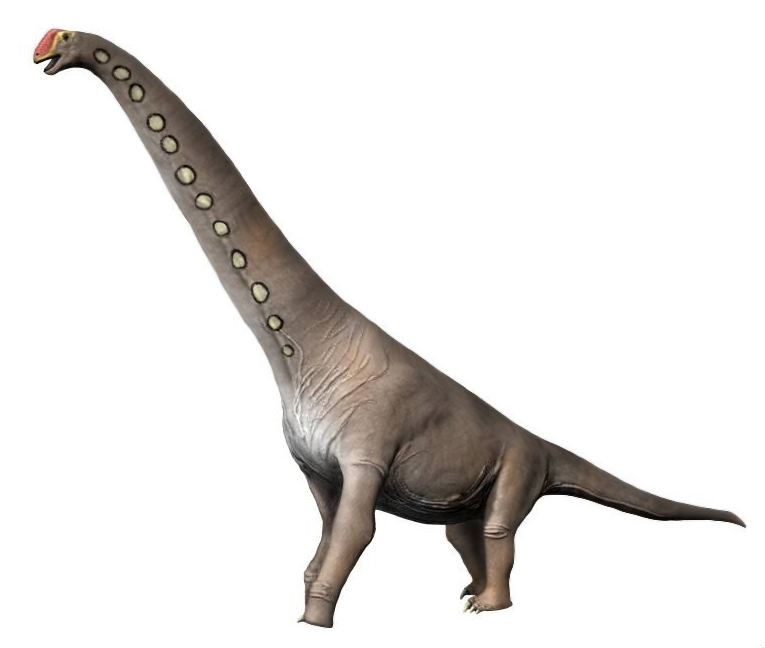
Restoration showing hypothetical nasal ornamentation and eyespots

=== Habits ===
It was believed throughout the nineteenth and early twentieth centuries that sauropods like Brachiosaurus were too massive to support their own weight on dry land, and instead lived partly submerged in water. Riggs, affirming observations by John Bell Hatcher, was the first to defend in length that most sauropods were fully terrestrial animals in his 1904 account on Brachiosaurus, pointing out that their hollow vertebrae have no analogue in living aquatic or semiaquatic animals, and their long limbs and compact feet indicate specialization for terrestrial locomotion. Brachiosaurus would have been better adapted than other sauropods to a fully terrestrial lifestyle through its slender limbs, high chest, wide hips, high ilia and short tail. In its dorsal vertebrae the zygapophyses were very reduced while the hyposphene-hypantrum complex was extremely developed, resulting in a stiff torso incapable of bending sideways. The body was fit for only quadrupedal movement on land. Though Riggs's ideas were gradually forgotten during the first half of the twentieth century, the notion of sauropods as terrestrial animals has gained support since the 1950s, and is now universally accepted among paleontologists. In 1990 the paleontologist Stephen Czerkas stated that Brachiosaurus could have entered water occasionally to cool off (thermoregulate). Brachiosaurus is estimated to have walked at a speed of 1.49 meters per second (5.4 km/h; 3.3 mph).

=== Neck posture ===
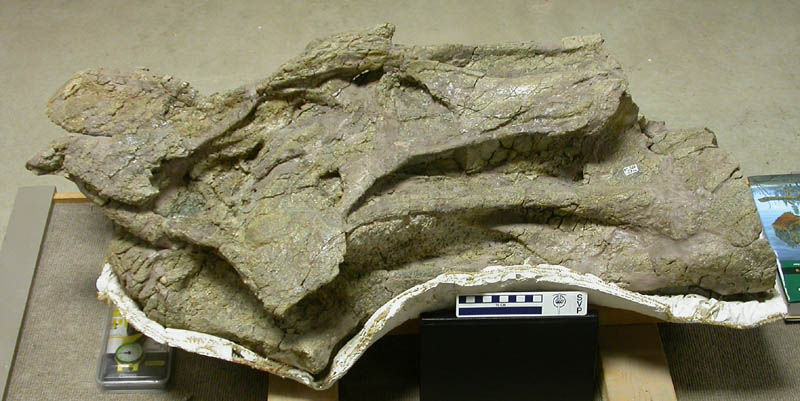
Assigned neck vertebra BYU 12866, BYU Museum of Paleontology

Ongoing debate revolves around the neck posture of brachiosaurids, with estimates ranging from near-vertical to horizontal orientations. The idea of near-vertical postures in sauropods in general was popular until 1999, when Stevens and Parrish argued that the sauropod neck was not flexible enough to be held in an upright, S-curved pose, and instead was held horizontally. Reflecting this research, various newspapers ran stories criticizing the Field Museum Brachiosaurus mount for having an upward curving neck. Museum paleontologists Olivier Rieppel and Christopher Brochu defended the posture in 1999, noting the long forelimbs and upward sloping backbone. They also stated that the most developed neural spines for muscle attachment being positioned in the region of the shoulder girdle would have permitted the neck to be raised in a giraffe-like posture. Furthermore, such a pose would have required less energy than lowering its neck, and the inter-vertebral discs would not have been able to counter the pressure caused by a lowered head for extended periods of time (though lowering its neck to drink must have been possible). Some recent studies also advocated a more upward directed neck. Christian and Dzemski (2007) estimated that the middle part of the neck in Giraffatitan was inclined by sixty to seventy degrees; a horizontal posture could be maintained only for short periods of time.

With their heads held high above the heart, brachiosaurids would have had stressed cardiovascular systems. It is estimated that the heart of Brachiosaurus would have to pump double the blood pressure of a giraffe to reach the brain, and possibly weighed 400 kg (880 lb). The distance between head and heart would have been reduced by the S-curvature of the neck by more than 2 meters (6 1/2 ft) in comparison to a totally vertical posture. The neck may also have been lowered during locomotion by twenty degrees. In studying the inner ear of Giraffatitan, Gunga & Kirsch (2001) concluded that brachiosaurids would have moved their necks in lateral directions more often than in dorsal-ventral directions while feeding.

=== Feeding and diet ===
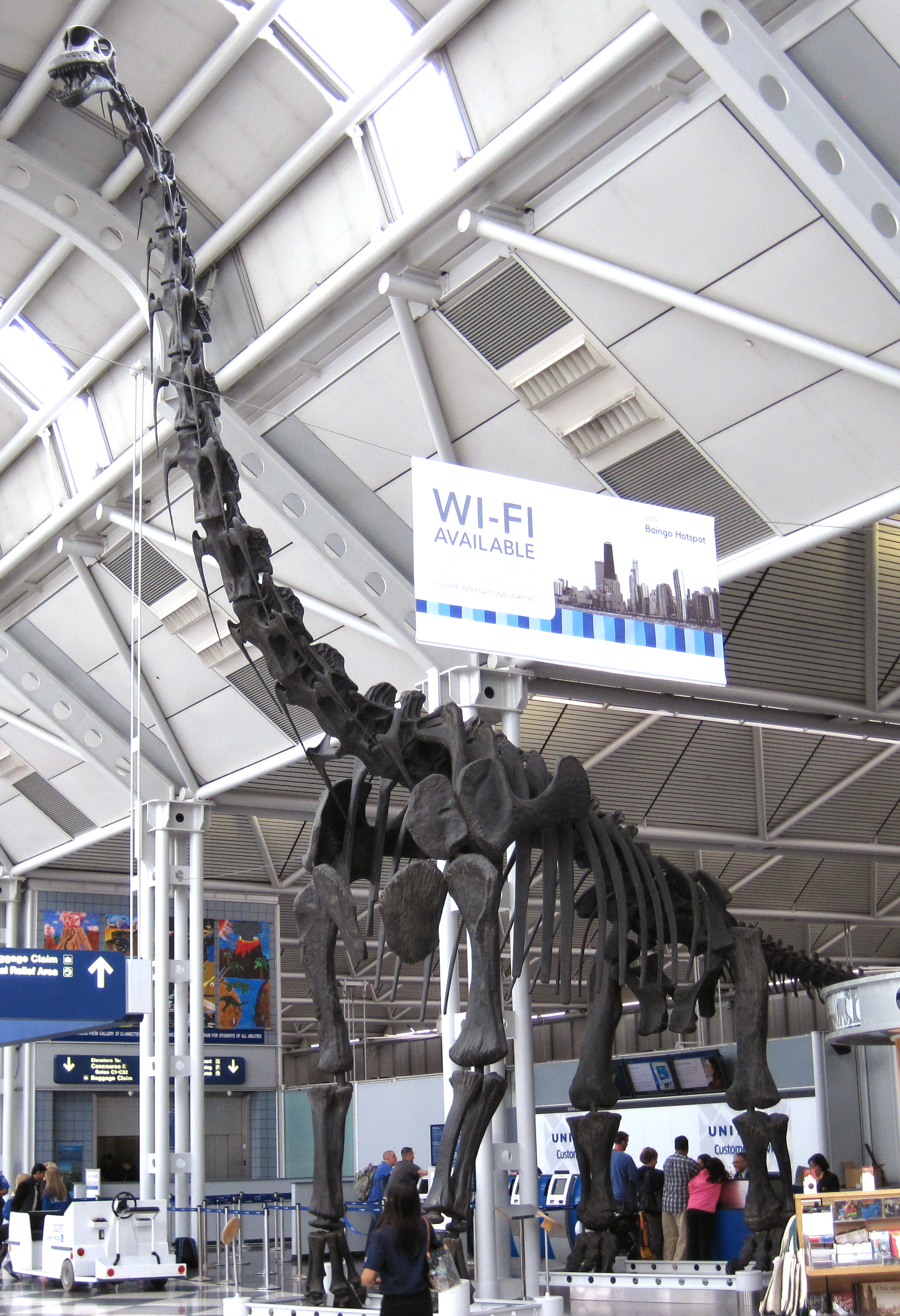
Replica skeleton showing the neck pointing upward, at O'Hare International Airport (formerly housed in the Field Museum)

Brachiosaurus is thought to have been a high browser, feeding on foliage well above the ground. Even if it did not hold its neck near vertical, and instead had a less inclined neck, its head height may still have been over 9 meters (30 ft) above the ground. It probably fed mostly on foliage above 5 meters (16 ft). This does not preclude the possibility that it also fed lower at times, between 3 and 5 meters (9.8 and 16.4 ft) up. Its diet likely consisted of ginkgos, conifers, tree ferns, and large cycads, with intake estimated at 200 to 400 kilograms (440 to 880 lb) of plant matter daily in a 2007 study. Brachiosaurid feeding involved simple up-and-down jaw motion. As in other sauropods, animals would have swallowed plant matter without further oral processing, and relied on hindgut fermentation for food processing. The teeth were somewhat spoon-shaped and chisel-like. Such teeth are optimized for non-selective nipping, and the relatively broad jaws could crop large amounts of plant material. Even if a Brachiosaurus of forty tonnes would have needed half a tonne of fodder, its dietary needs could have been met by a normal cropping action of the head. If it fed sixteen hours per day, biting off between a tenth and two-thirds of a kilogram, taking between one and six bites per minute, its daily food intake would have equaled roughly 1.5 percent of its body mass, comparable to the requirement of a modern elephant.

As Brachiosaurus shared its habitat, the Morrison, with many other sauropod species, its specialization for feeding at greater heights would have been part of a system of niche partitioning, the various taxa thus avoiding direct competition with each other. A typical food tree might have resembled Sequoiadendron. The fact that such tall conifers were relatively rare in the Morrison might explain why Brachiosaurus was much less common in its ecosystem than the related Giraffatitan, which seems to have been one of the most abundant sauropods in the Tendaguru. Brachiosaurus, with its shorter arms and lower shoulders, was not as well-adapted to high-browsing as Giraffatitan.

It has been suggested that Brachiosaurus could rear on its hind legs to feed, using its tail for extra ground support. A detailed physical modelling-based analysis of sauropod rearing capabilities by Heinrich Mallison showed that while many sauropods could rear, the unusual body shape and limb length ratio of brachiosaurids made them exceptionally ill-suited for rearing. The forward position of its center of mass would have led to problems with stability, and required unreasonably large forces in the hips to obtain an upright posture. Brachiosaurus would also have gained only 33 percent more feeding height, compared to other sauropods, for which rearing may have tripled the feeding height. A bipedal stance might have been adopted by Brachiosaurus in exceptional situations, like male dominance fights.

The downward mobility of the neck of Brachiosaurus would have allowed it to reach open water at the level of its feet, while standing upright. Modern giraffes spread their forelimbs to lower the mouth in a relatively horizontal position, to more easily gulp down the water. It is unlikely that Brachiosaurus could have attained a stable posture this way, forcing the animal to plunge the snout almost vertically into the surface of a lake or stream. This would have submerged its fleshy nostrils if they were located at the tip of the snout as Witmer hypothesized. Hallett and Wedel therefore in 2016 rejected his interpretation and suggested that they were in fact placed at the top of the head, above the bony nostrils, as traditionally thought. The nostrils might have evolved their retracted position to allow the animal to breathe while drinking.

=== Nostril function ===
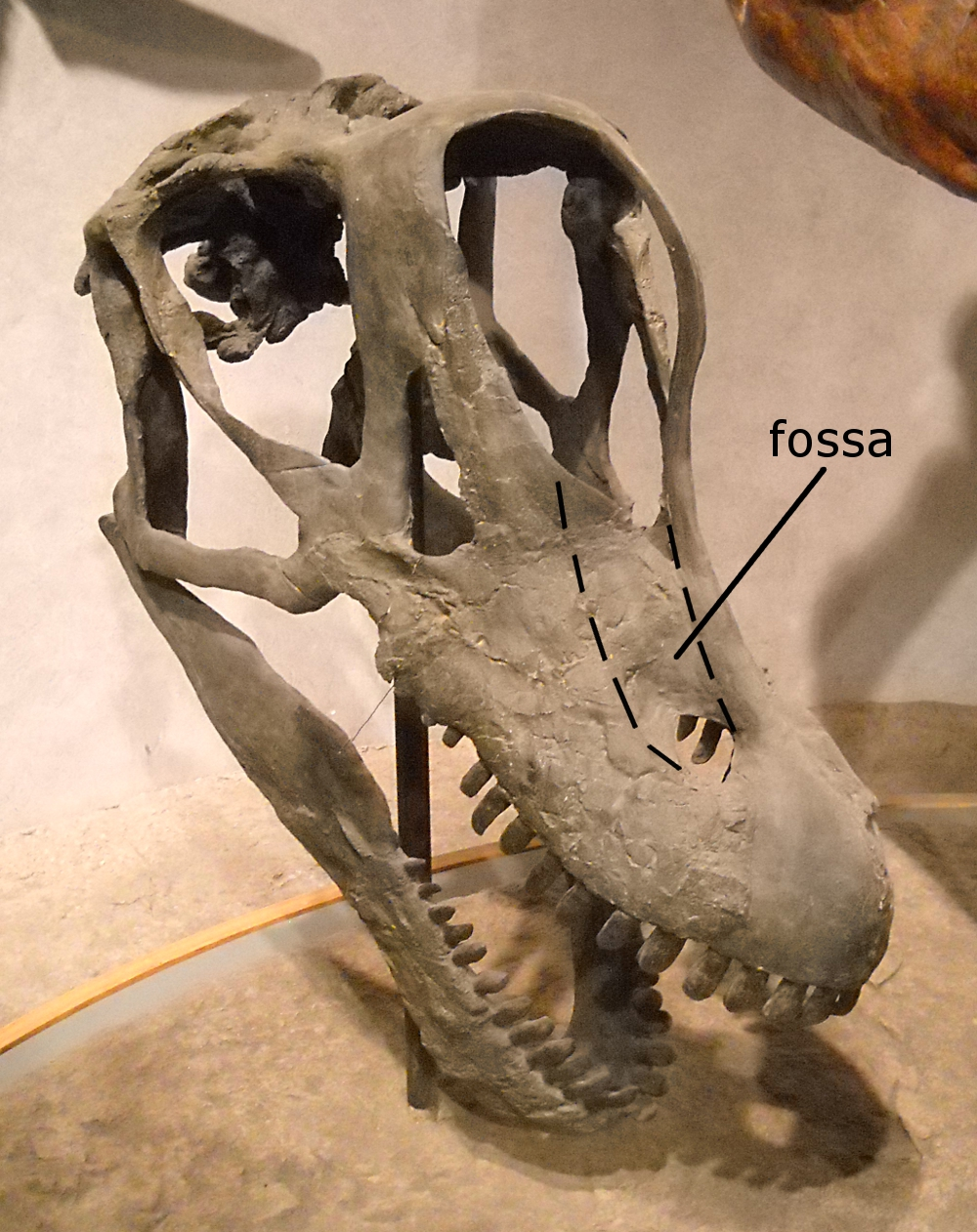
The fleshy external nostril would have been placed at the front of the nasal fossa, here demarcated by a dashed line.

The bony nasal openings of neosauropods like Brachiosaurus were large and placed on the top of their skulls. Traditionally, the fleshy nostrils of sauropods were thought to have been placed likewise on top of the head, roughly at the rear of the bony nostril opening, because these animals were erroneously thought to have been amphibious, using their large nasal openings as snorkels when submerged. The American paleontologist Lawrence M. Witmer rejected this reconstruction in 2001, pointing out that all living vertebrate land animals have their external fleshy nostrils placed at the front of the bony nostril. The fleshy nostrils of such sauropods would have been placed in an even more forward position, at the front of the narial fossa, the depression which extended far in front of the bony nostril toward the snout tip.

Czerkas speculated on the function of the peculiar brachiosaurid nose, and pointed out that there was no conclusive way to determine where the nostrils where located, unless a head with skin impressions was found. He suggested that the expanded nasal opening would have made room for tissue related to the animal's ability to smell, which would have helped smell proper vegetation. He also noted that in modern reptiles, the presence of bulbous, enlarged, and uplifted nasal bones can be correlated with fleshy horns and knobby protuberances, and that Brachiosaurus and other sauropods with large noses could have had ornamental nasal crests.

It has been proposed that sauropods, including Brachiosaurus, may have had proboscises (trunks) based on the position of the bony narial orifice, to increase their upward reach. Fabien Knoll and colleagues disputed this for Diplodocus and Camarasaurus in 2006, finding that the opening for the facial nerve in the braincase was small. The facial nerve was thus not enlarged as in elephants, where it is involved in operating the sophisticated musculature of the proboscis. However, Knoll and colleagues also noted that the facial nerve for Giraffatitan was larger, and could therefore not discard the possibility of a proboscis in this genus.

=== Metabolism ===
Like other sauropods, Brachiosaurus was probably homeothermic (maintaining a stable internal temperature) and endothermic (controlling body temperature through internal means) at least while growing, meaning that it could actively control its body temperature ("warm-blooded"), producing the necessary heat through a high basic metabolic rate of its cells. Russel (1989) used Brachiosaurus as an example of a dinosaur for which endothermy is unlikely, because of the combination of great size (leading to overheating) and great caloric needs to fuel endothermy. Sander (2010) found that these calculations were based on incorrect body mass estimates and faulty assumptions on the available cooling surfaces, as the presence of large air sacs was unknown at the time of the study. These inaccuracies resulted in the overestimation of heat production and the underestimation of heat loss. The large nasal arch has been postulated as an adaptation for cooling the brain, as a surface for evaporative cooling of the blood.

=== Air sacs ===
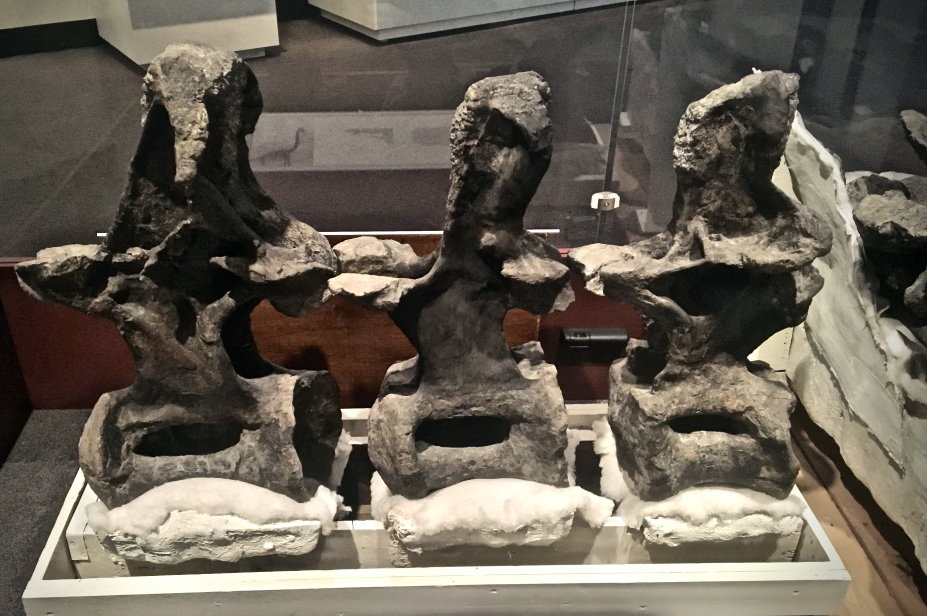
Dorsal vertebrae of the holotype. The openings at their lower sides are pleurocoels, through which air sacs invaded the bone and connected with air cells inside.

The respiration system of sauropods, like that of birds, made use of air sacs. There was not a bidirectional airflow as with mammals, in which the lungs function as bellows, first inhaling and then exhaling air. Instead the air was sucked from the trachea into an abdominal air sac in the belly which then pumped it forward through the parabronchi, air loops, of the stiff lung. Valves prevented the air from flowing backward when the abdominal air sac filled itself again; at the same time a cervical air sac at the neck base sucked out the spent air from the lung. Both air sacs contracted simultaneously to pump the used air out of the trachea. This procedure guaranteed a unidirectional airflow, the air always moving in a single forward direction in the lung itself. This significantly improved the oxygen intake and the release of carbon dioxide. Not only was dead air removed quickly but also the blood flow in the lung was counterdirectional in relation to the airflow, leading to a far more effective gas exchange.

In sauropods, the air sacs did not simply function as an aid for respiration; by means of air channels they were connected to much of the skeleton. These branches, the diverticula, via pneumatic openings invaded many bones and strongly hollowed them out. It is not entirely clear what the evolutionary benefit of this phenomenon was but in any case it considerably lightened the skeleton. They might also have removed excess heat to aid thermoregulation.

In 2016, Mark Hallett and Mathew Wedel for the first time reconstructed the entire air sac system of a sauropod, using B. altithorax as an example of how such a structure might have been formed. In their reconstruction a large abdominal air sac was located between the pelvis and the outer lung side. As with birds, three smaller sacs assisted the pumping process from the underside of the breast cavity: at the rear the posterior thoracic air sac, in the middle the anterior thoracic air sac and in front the clavicular air sac, in that order gradually diminishing in size. The cervical air sac was positioned under the shoulder blade, on top of the front lung. The air sacs were via tubes connected with the vertebrae. Diverticula filled the various fossae and pleurocoels that formed depressions in the vertebral bone walls. These were again connected with inflexible air cells inside the bones.

=== Growth ===
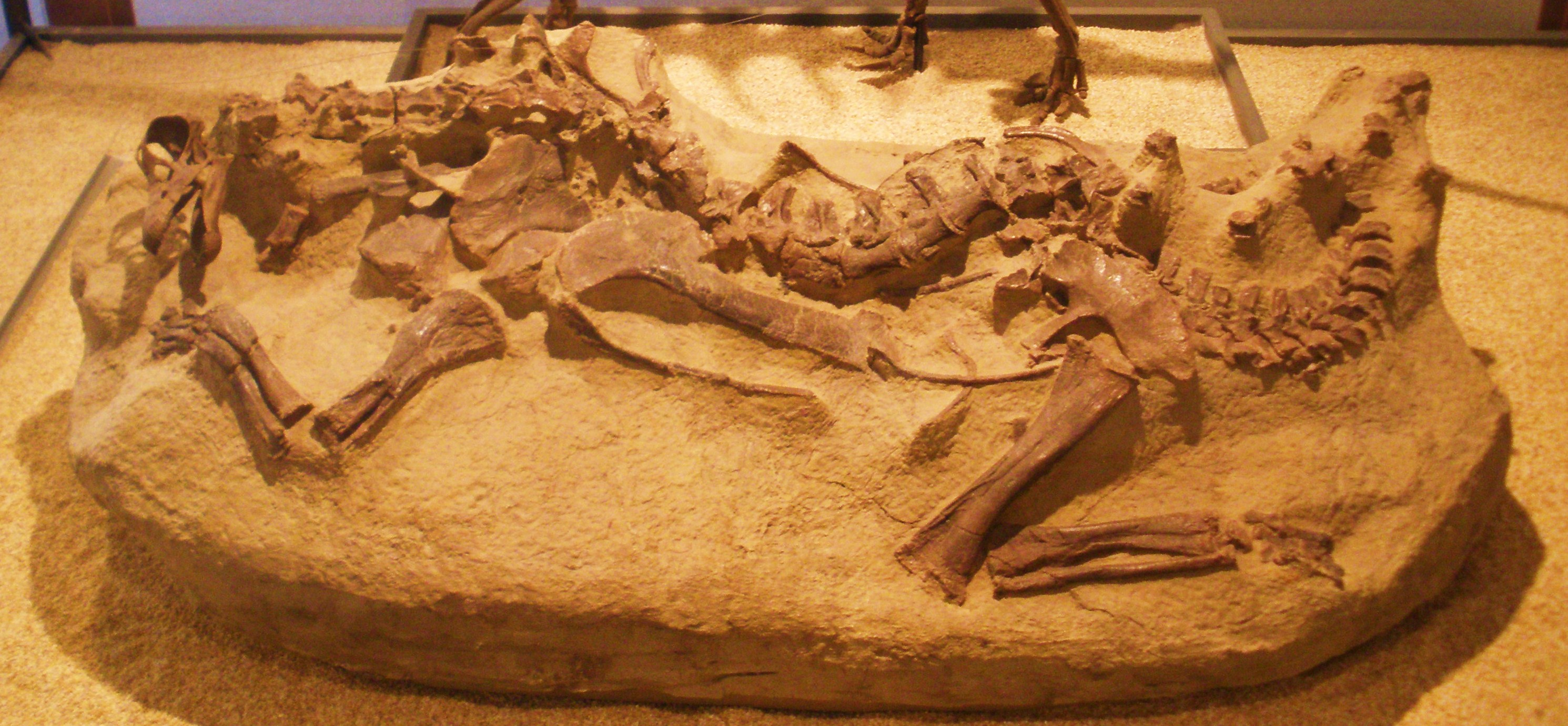
Juvenile B. sp. specimen SMA 0009, nicknamed Toni. The skull is reconstructed following the initial diplodocoid identification), Sauriermuseum Aathal.

The ontogeny of Brachiosaurus has been reconstructed by Carballido and colleagues in 2012 based on Toni (SMA 0009), a postcranial skeleton of a young juvenile with an estimated total body length of just 2 meters (6.6 ft). This skeleton shares some unique traits with the B. altithorax holotype, indicating it is referable to this species. These commonalities include an elevation on the rear blade of the ilium; the lack of a postspinal lamina; vertical neural spines on the back; an ilium with a subtle notch between the appendage for the ischium and the rear blade; and the lack of a side bulge on the upper thighbone. There are also differences; these might indicate that the juvenile is not a B. altithorax individual after all, but belongs to a new species. Alternatively, they might be explained as juvenile traits that would have changed when the animal matured.

Such ontogenetic changes are especially to be expected in the proportions of an organism. The middle neck vertebrae of SMA 0009 are remarkably short for a sauropod, being just 1.8 times longer than high, compared with a ratio of 4.5 in Giraffatitan. This suggests that the necks of brachiosaurids became proportionally much longer while their backs, to the contrary, experienced relative negative growth. The humerus of SMA 0009 is relatively robust: it is more slender than that of most basal titanosauriforms but thicker than the upper arm bone of B. altithorax. This suggests that it was already lengthening in an early juvenile stage and became even more slender during growth. This is in contrast to diplodocoids and basal macronarians, whose slender humeri are not due to such allometric growth. Brachiosaurus also appears to have experienced an elongation of the metacarpals, which in juveniles were shorter compared to the length of the radius; SMA 0009 had a ratio of just 0.33, the lowest known in the entire Neosauropoda.

Another plausible ontogenetic change is the increased pneumatization of the vertebrae. During growth, the diverticula of the air sacs invaded the bones and hollowed them out. SMA 0009 already has pleurocoels, pneumatic excavations, at the sides of its neck vertebrae. These are divided by a ridge but are otherwise still very simple in structure, compared with the extremely complex ridge systems typically shown by adult derived sauropods. Its dorsal vertebrae still completely lack these.

Two traits are not so obviously linked to ontogeny. The neural spines of the rear dorsal vertebrae and the front sacral vertebrae are extremely compressed transversely, being eight times longer from front to rear than wide from side to side. The spinodiapophyseal lamina or "SPOL", the ridge normally running from each side of the neural spine toward each diapophysis, the transverse process bearing the contact facet for the upper rib head, is totally lacking. Both traits could be autapomorphies, unique derived characters proving that SMA 0009 represents a distinct species, but there are indications that these traits are growth-related as well. Of the basal sauropod Tazoudasaurus a young juvenile is known that also lacks the spinodiapophyseal lamina, whereas the adult form has an incipient ridge. Furthermore, a very young juvenile of Europasaurus had a weak SPOL but it is well developed in mature individuals. These two cases represent the only finds in which the condition can be checked; they suggest that the SPOL developed during growth. As this very ridge widens the neural spine, its transverse compression is not an independent trait and the development of the SPOL plausibly precedes the thickening of the neural spine with more mature animals.

Sauropods were likely able to sexually reproduce before they attained their maximum individual size. The maturation rate differed between species. Its bone structure indicates that Brachiosaurus was able to reproduce when it reached forty percent of its maximal size. In 2005, Jack Horner estimated that Brachiosaurus reached adulthood in less than 20 years.

== Paleoecology ==
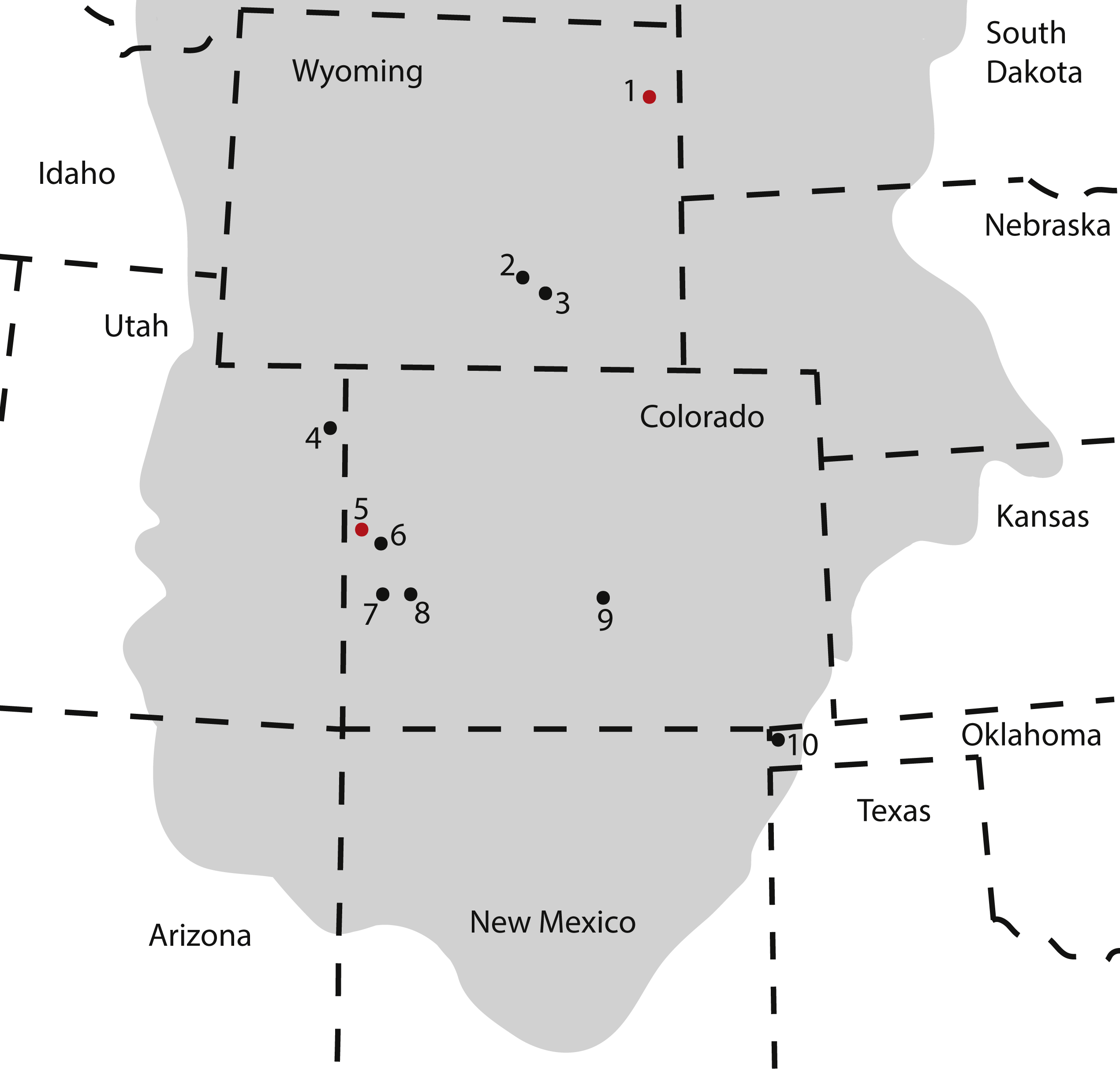
Map showing locations of brachiosaurid remains from the Morrison Formation (gray); 5 (the red dot) is the B. altithorax type locality

Brachiosaurus is known only from the Morrison Formation of western North America (following the reassignment of the African species), from the Kimmeridgian and Tithonian ages (155.6 to 145.5 million years ago). The Morrison Formation is interpreted as a semiarid environment with distinct wet and dry seasons, and flat floodplains. Several other sauropod genera were present in the Morrison Formation, with differing body proportions and feeding adaptations. Among these were Apatosaurus, Barosaurus, Camarasaurus, Diplodocus, Haplocanthosaurus, and Supersaurus. Brachiosaurus was one of the less abundant Morrison Formation sauropods. In a 2003 survey of more than two hundred fossil localities, John Foster reported 12 specimens of the genus, comparable to Barosaurus (13) and Haplocanthosaurus (12), but far fewer than Apatosaurus (112), Camarasaurus (179), and Diplodocus (98). If the large foot reported from Wyoming (the northernmost occurrence of a brachiosaurid in North America) did belong to Brachiosaurus, the genus would have covered a wide range of latitudes. Brachiosaurids could process tough vegetation with their broad-crowned teeth, and might therefore have covered a wider range of vegetational zones than for example diplodocids. Camarasaurids, which were similar in tooth morphology to brachiosaurids, were also widespread and are known to have migrated seasonally, so this might have also been true for brachiosaurids.

Paleoenvironment and dinosaurs of the Morrison Formation

Other dinosaurs known from the Morrison Formation include the predatory theropods Koparion, Stokesosaurus, Ornitholestes, Ceratosaurus, Allosaurus and Torvosaurus, as well as the herbivorous ornithischians Camptosaurus, Dryosaurus, Othnielia, Gargoyleosaurus and Stegosaurus. Allosaurus accounted for 70 to 75 percent of theropod specimens and was at the top trophic level of the Morrison food web. Ceratosaurus might have specialized in attacking large sauropods, including smaller individuals of Brachiosaurus. Other vertebrates that shared this paleoenvironment included ray-finned fish, frogs, salamanders, turtles like Dorsetochelys, sphenodonts, lizards, terrestrial and aquatic crocodylomorphs such as Hoplosuchus, and several species of pterosaur like Harpactognathus and Mesadactylus. Shells of bivalves and aquatic snails are also common. The flora of the period has been revealed by fossils of green algae, fungi, mosses, horsetails, cycads, ginkgoes, and several families of conifers. Vegetation varied from river-lining forests in otherwise treeless settings (gallery forests) with tree ferns, and ferns, to fern savannas with occasional trees such as the Araucaria-like conifer Brachyphyllum.

== Cultural significance ==
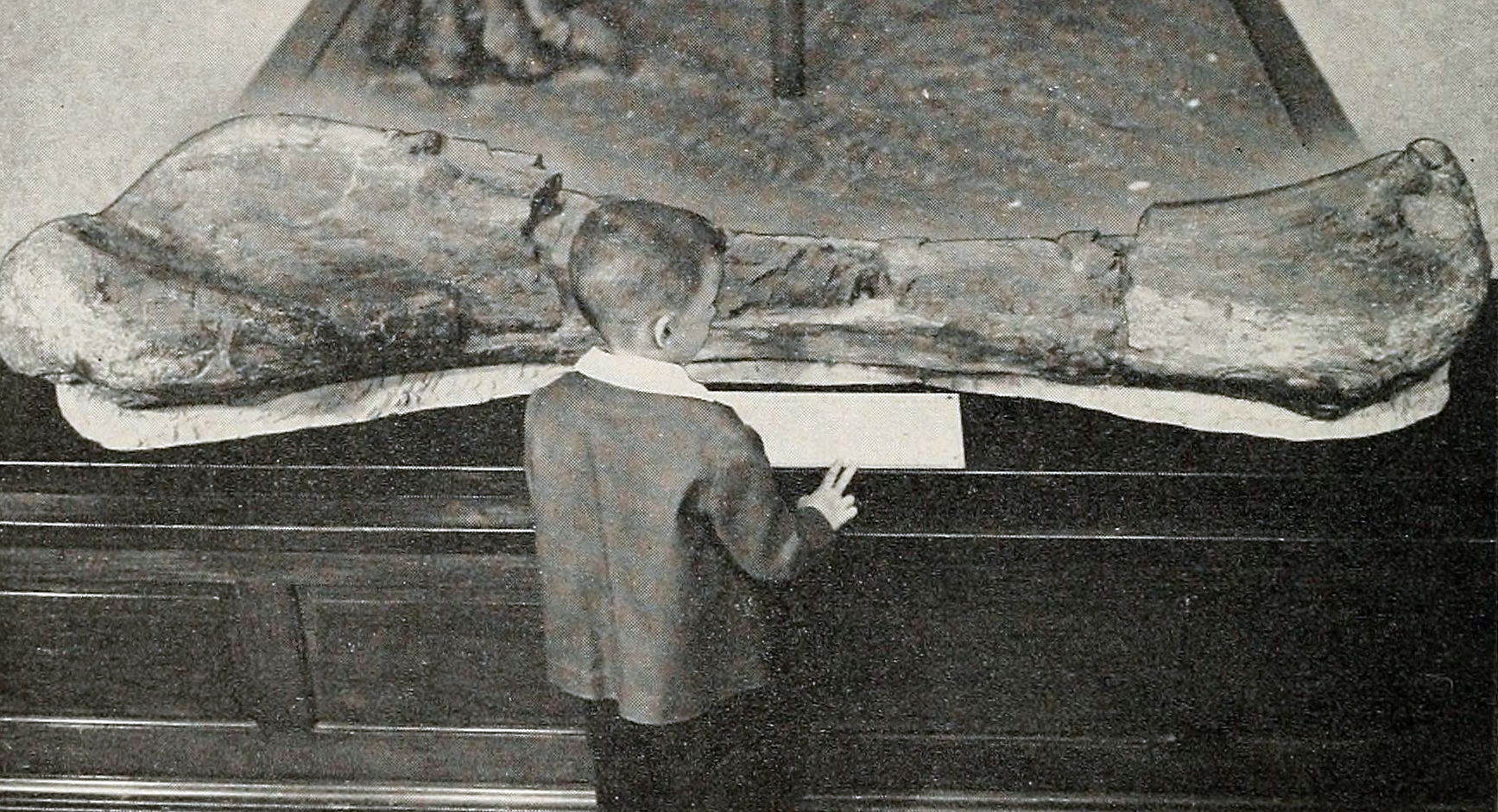
Child with the Potter Creek humerus, 1959

Riggs in the first instance tried to limit public awareness of the find. When reading a lecture to the inhabitants of Grand Junction, illustrated by lantern slides, on July 27, 1900, he explained the general evolution of dinosaurs and the exploration methods of museum field crews but did not mention that he had just found a spectacular specimen. He feared that teams of other institutions might soon learn of the discovery and take away the best of the remaining fossils. A week later, his host Bradbury published an article in the local Grand Junction News announcing the find of one of the largest dinosaurs ever. On August 14, The New York Times brought the story. At the time sauropod dinosaurs appealed to the public because of their great size, often exaggerated by sensationalist newspapers. Riggs in his publications played into this by emphasizing the enormous magnitude of Brachiosaurus. Replica skeletons of Brachiosaurus can be seen in Chicago, Illinois, one outside the Field Museum and another inside the O'Hare International Airport.

Brachiosaurus has been called one of the most iconic dinosaurs, but most popular depictions are based on the African species B. brancai which has since been moved to its own genus, Giraffatitan. A main belt asteroid, 1991 GX_{7}, was named 9954 Brachiosaurus in honor of the genus in 1991. Brachiosaurus was featured in the 1993 movie Jurassic Park, as the first computer generated dinosaur shown. These effects were considered ground-breaking at the time, and the awe of the movie's characters upon seeing the dinosaur for the first time was mirrored by audiences. The movements of the movie's Brachiosaurus were based on the gait of a giraffe combined with the mass of an elephant. A scene later in the movie used an animatronic head and neck, for when a Brachiosaurus interacts with human characters. The digital model of Brachiosaurus used in Jurassic Park later became the starting point for the ronto models in the 1997 special edition of the film Star Wars Episode IV: A New Hope.

== Bibliography ==
- Brinkman, P. D. (2010), The Second Jurassic Dinosaur Rush: Museums and Paleontology in America at the Turn of the Twentieth Century, Chicago and London: The University of Chicago Press, ISBN 978-0-226-07472-6
- Hallett, M.; Wedel, M. (2016), The Sauropod Dinosaurs: Life in the Age of Giants, Baltimore: Johns Hopkins University Press, ISBN 978-1-4214-2028-8
