= Potter Creek (Hastings County) =

Potter Creek ruisseau Potter
- Location of the mouth of Potter Creek in Southern Ontario

Location
- Country: Canada
- Province: Ontario
- Region: Central Ontario
- County: Hastings County
- Municipalities: Belleville; Quinte West

Physical characteristics
- Source: unnamed pond
  - location: Quinte West
  - coordinates: 44°11′38″N 77°27′34″W
  - elevation: 110 metres (360 ft)
- Mouth: Bay of Quinte
  - location: Quinte West
  - coordinates: 44°08′13″N 77°25′39″W
  - elevation: 74.1 metres (243 ft)

Basin features
- River system: Lake Ontario drainage basin

Potter Creek (French: ruisseau Potter) is a stream in the municipalities of Quinte West and Belleville in Central Ontario, Canada. It is a tributary of the Bay of Quinte and is thus in the Lake Ontario drainage basin.

== Course ==
Potter Creek begins at an unnamed pond in Quinte West at an elevation of 110 metres (360 ft) and heads south, then southwest, then south again, and passes under Ontario Highway 401. It continues south, then turns east, flows under Wallbridge-Loyalist Road, and enters the city of Belleville. The creek turns south, heads under the Canadian National Railway main line and Moira Street, and curves southwest. Potter Creek flows once again under Wallbridge-Loyalist Road and re-inters Quinte West, passing into Potter's Creek Conservation Area. It then turns south, flows under the Canadian Pacific Railway mainline, heads by the Quinte Conservation headquarters, flows under Old Highway 2, and reaches its mouth at the Bay of Quinte at an elevation of 74.1 metres (243 ft). The Bay of Quinte is part of Lake Ontario.
