= Sibilobilo Safari Area =

- IUCN category VI (protected area with sustainable use of natural resources)
- Location: Kariba (District), Zimbabwe
- Nearest city: Kariba
- Area: 22.7 km^{2} (8.8 sq mi)
- Established: 1979 (previously a Controlled Hunting Area)
- Governing body: Zimbabwe Parks and Wildlife Management Authority

Sibilobilo Safari Area comprises the Sibilobilo Islands in Lake Kariba and is part of the Zimbabwe Parks and Wildlife Estate.

== History of the park ==
The safari area was proclaimed in 1975, prior to which it was a Controlled Hunting Area, since the impoundment of Lake Kariba.

== Features ==
=== Geography and geology ===
The Safari Area comprises 13 islands in Lake Kariba, the largest of which are Namembere, Namagwaba and Weather, and 2,130 ha of the Sengwa Peninsular.

The Sibilobilo area is underlain by rocks of the Mesozoic Upper Karoo Group, predominantly sandstones and basalts. Specimens of Vulcanodon karibaensis have been found in the Vulcanodon beds within the Batoka basalt.

== Accommodation and camping ==
None current or proposed.

== Tourism ==
=== Access ===
By boat from Kariba or by motorable track from Bumi Hills.

=== Concessions ===
The Sibilobilo Safari Area is divided into two sections A (the islands) and B (the peninsular), which are let under concession to tour operators or for recreational hunting.

== See also ==
- Bumi Hills
- Lake Kariba
- Matusadona National Park
