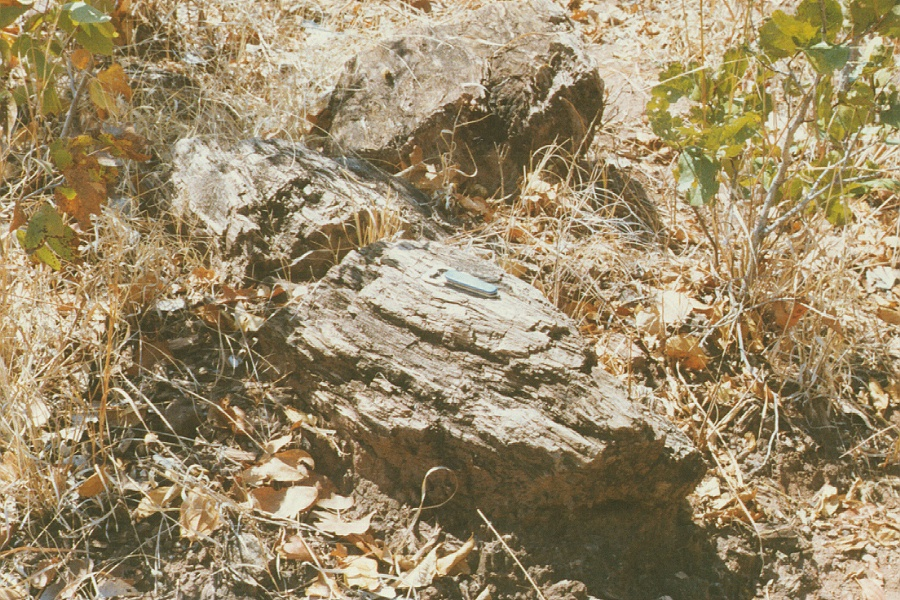
- Agathoxylon fossil trunks from the Bumi Hills area of Zimbabwe

Scientific classification
- Kingdom: Plantae
- Clade: Embryophytes
- Clade: Tracheophytes
- Clade: Spermatophytes
- Clade: Gymnosperms
- Division: Pinophyta
- Class: Pinopsida
- Order: Araucariales
- Family: Araucariaceae
- Genus: †Agathoxylon; Hartig 1848

Type species
- †Agathoxylon cordaianum Hartig 1848

Species
- See text

Synonyms
- Agathoxylon synonymy: Agathoxylon P.Greguss 1952; Araucariopsis Caspary; Araucarioxylon Kraus; Cordaioxylon Felix; Cordaixylon Grand; Cordaites; Dadoxylon Endlicher; Dammaroxylon J.Schultze-Motel; Palaeoxylon A.T.Brongniart; Peuce Lindley & W.Hutton; Platyspiroxylon P.Greguss; Simplicioxylon G.Andreánszky

= Agathoxylon =

Agathoxylon Temporal range: Late Carboniferous-Maastrichtian 317–66 Ma

Extinct genus of conifers of the family Araucariaceae

Agathoxylon (also known by the synonyms Dadoxylon and Araucarioxylon) is a form genus of fossil wood, including massive tree trunks. Although identified from the late Palaeozoic to the end of the Mesozoic, Agathoxylon is common from the Carboniferous to Triassic. Agathoxylon represents the wood of multiple conifer groups, including both Araucariaceae and Cheirolepidiaceae, with late Paleozoic and Triassic forms possibly representing other conifers or other seed plant groups like "pteridosperms".

== Description ==
Agathoxylon were large trees that bore long strap-like leaves and trunks with small, narrow rays. Often the original cellular structure is preserved as a result of silica in solution in the ground water becoming deposited within the wood cells. This mode of fossilization is termed permineralization.

== Systematics ==
As a genus, Dadoxylon was poorly defined, and apart from Araucariaceae, has been associated with fossil wood as diverse as Cordaitales, Glossopteridales and Podocarpaceae. Furthermore, it may be the same form genus as Araucarioxylon, hence the usage Dadoxylon (Araucarioxylon). The genus Agathoxylon, classified under the family Araucariaceae, has nomenclatural priority over the genera Araucarioxylon and Dadoxylon.

Several Dadoxylon species, such as D. brandlingii and D. saxonicum have been identified as Araucarites. D. arberi and D. sp.1 were synonymised with the glossopterid species Australoxylon teixterae and A. natalense, respectively; while D. sp. 2 was transferred to Protophyllocladoxylon.

=== Species ===
- Agathoxylon arizonicum [=Araucarioxylon arizonicum] Chinle Formation, Arizona, New Mexico, United States Late Triassic
- Agathoxylon africanum (Bamford 1999) [=Araucarioxylon africanum]: Daptocephalus Assemblage Zone, Middleton Formation and Normandien Formation to Cynognathus Assemblage Zone, Burgersdorp Formation and Driekoppen Formation, Beaufort Group, South Africa, and Lebung Group, Botswana
- Agathoxylon agathioides (Kräusel & Jain): La Matilde Formation, Argentina
- Agathoxylon antarcticus (Poole & Cantrill 2001) Pujana et al. 2014 [=A. matildense, Araucarioxylon antarcticus]: Santa Marta Formation and La Meseta Formation, Antarctica
- Agathoxylon arberi (Seward 1919) [=Dadoxylon arberi]
- Agathoxylon australe[=Dadoxylon australe]
- Agathoxylon bougheyi Williams [=Dadoxylon bougheyi]: Madumabisa Mudstone Formation, Zambia and Somabula Beds, Zimbabwe
- Agathoxylon cordaianum Hartig 1848
- Agathoxylon desnoyersii (Phillipe 2011) [=Araucarioxylon desnoyersii]
- Agathoxylon duplicatum (Vogellehner 1965) [=Dadoxylon duplicatum]: Germany
- Agathoxylon jamudhiense (Maheshwari 1963) [=Dadoxylon jamudhiense]: India
- Agathoxylon karooensis (Bamford 1999) [=Araucarioxylon karooensis]: Daptocephalus AZ, Middleton and Normandien Formations, South Africa
- Agathoxylon kellerense (Lucas and Lacey 1984) [=Araucarioxylon kellerense, Dadoxylon kellerense]: Santa Marta Formation, Antarctica
- Agathoxylon lemonii Tidwell & Thayn 1986: Dakota Formation, Utah
- Agathoxylon maharashtraensis (Prasad 1982) [=Dadoxylon maharashtraensis]: India
- Agathoxylon parenchymatosum (Vogellehner 1965) [=Araucarioxylon parenchymatosum, Dadoxylon parenchymatosum]: Forest Sandstone Formation, Botswana
- Agathoxylon pseudoparenchymatosum (Gothan 1908) Pujana et al. 2014 [=Araucarioxylon chilense, A. kerguelense, A. novaezeelandii, A. pseudoparenchymatosum, Dadoxylon kaiparaense, D. kergulense, D. pseudoparenchymatosum]: Santa Marta Formation, Antarctica
- Agathoxylon santacruzense Kloster and Gnaedinger 2018: La Matilde Formation, Argentina
- Agathoxylon santalense (Sah & Jain): La Matilde Formation, Argentina
- Agathoxylon sclerosum (Walton) Kräusel 1956 [=Dadoxylon sclerosum, Kaokoxylon sclerosum]: Malay Peninsula, Dwyka Group to Molteno Formation, Stormberg Group, South Africa, and Ntawere Formation, Zambia
- Agathoxylon termieri (Attims) Gnaedinger & Herbst: La Matilde Formation, Argentina
- Agathoxylon ulmitus Iamandei & Iamandei 2004: Romania
- Agathoxylon woodworthii (Knowlton 1899) [=Dadoxylon woodworthii]: United States

== Distribution ==
Agathoxylon is common in many parts of the world, found in sites of both Gondwana and Laurasia and reported from southern Africa, Asia, the Middle East, Europe, South America, and North America.

In southern Africa, Agathoxylon is widespread in the Karoo Supergroup. In Zimbabwe, it is especially encountered in the Pebbly Arkose Formation, and also reported frequently from the Angwa Sandstone Formation.
