= Angwa Sandstone =

Geological formation of southern Africa

- Stratigraphic range: Triassic; ~252–210 Ma
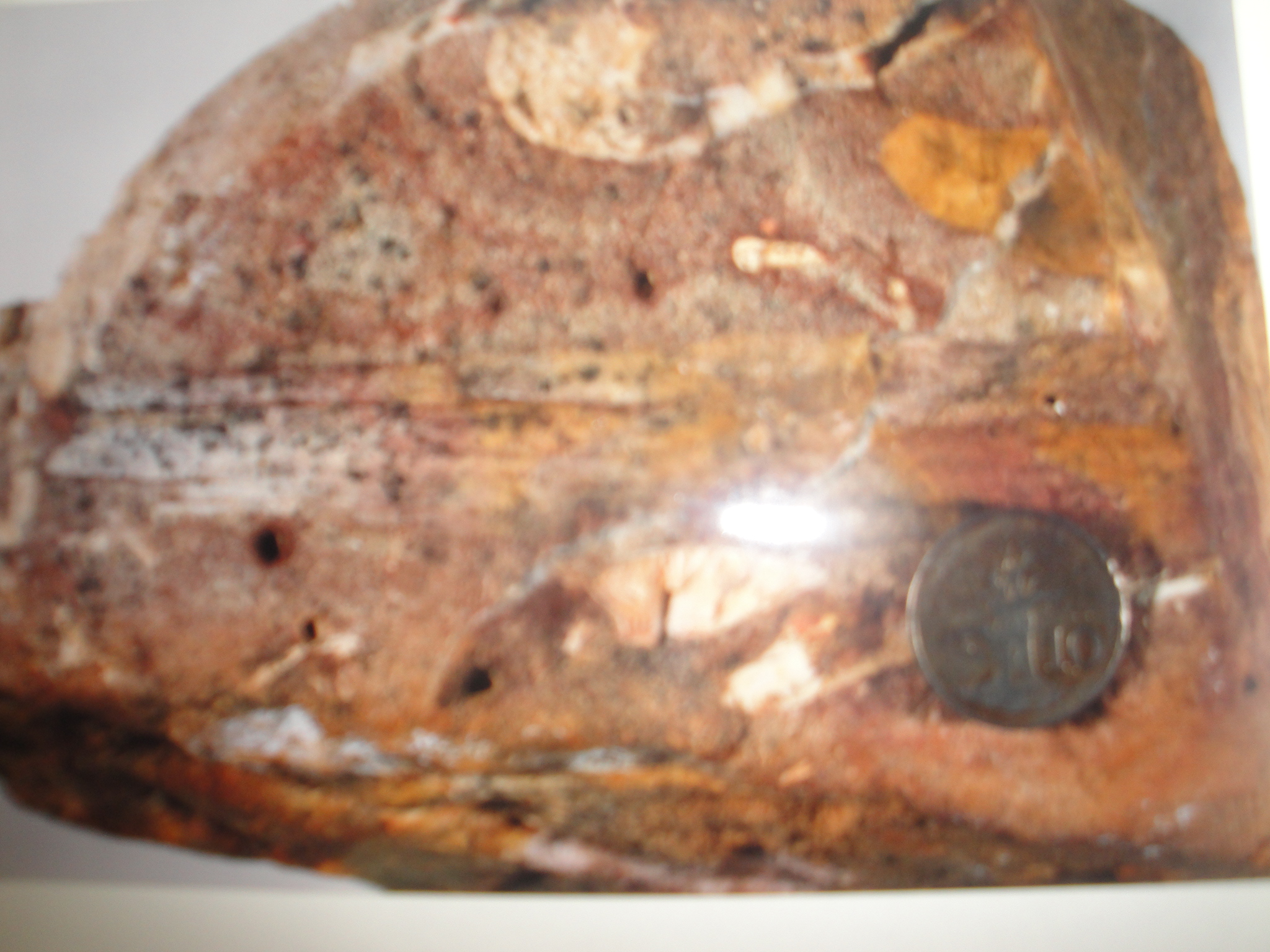
- Angwa sandstone boulder from Chirundu Hill, Hurungwe District, Zimbabwe
- Type: Geological formation
- Unit of: Upper Karoo Group, Karoo Supergroup
- Sub-units: Alternations Mb. Massive Sandstone Mb.
- Underlies: Pebbly Arkose Formation
- Overlies: Lower Karoo Group

Lithology
- Primary: Sandstone
- Other: Siltstone

Location
- Coordinates: 16.107°S 30.307°E
- Country: Mozambique, Zambia, Zimbabwe

Type section
- Named for: Angwa River, Zimbabwe
- Named by: P.M. Oesterlen, Zimbabwe Geological Survey
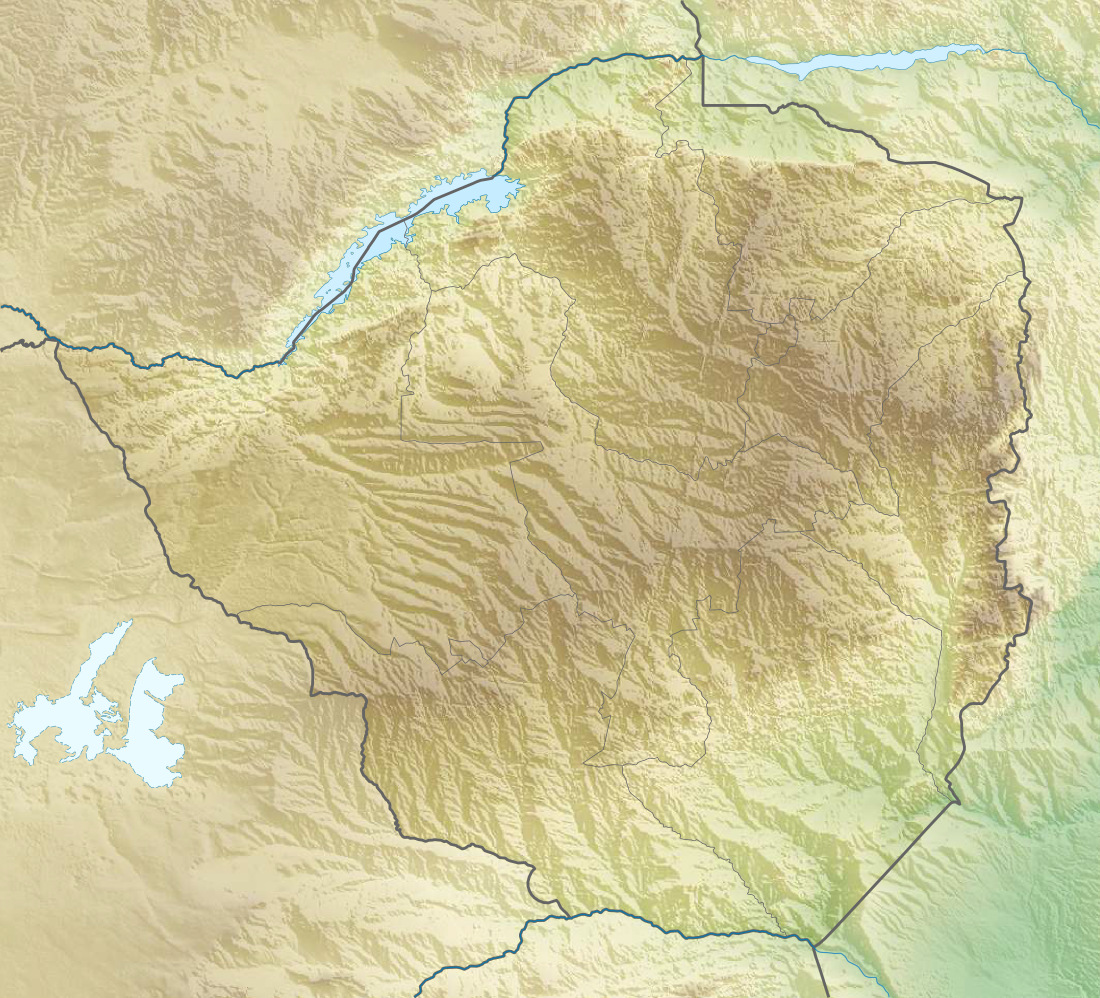
- Angwa Sandstone (Zimbabwe)

The Angwa Sandstone is a geological formation of the mid-Triassic Cabora Bassa Basin and Mana Pools Basin of southern Africa, consisting mainly of sandstone.

== Description ==
=== Stratigraphy ===
The Angwa Sandstone is the lowest formation in the Upper Karoo Group of the Karoo Supergroup, underlying the Pebbly Arkose Formation and overlying the Lower Karoo Group. The formation is divided into two members: the Alternations Member and the Massive Sandstone (Chirambakadoma) Member.

The Angwa Sandstone has been correlated to the Molteno Formation of the Great Karoo Basin, South Africa, and to the Escarpment Grit of the Mid-Zambezi Basin.

=== Lithology ===
The formation is a sedimentary unit, consisting mainly of fluvial sands and silts.

It has been dated as covering rocks from much of the Triassic, with pollen and flora identified from the Induan, and Ladinian to Norian.

== Occurrence ==
The Angwa Sandstone Formation is found in Mozambique, Zambia, Zimbabwe, in the Mana Pools and Cabora Bassa Basins.

== Fossil Content ==
Pinales of the Angwa Sandstone
Genus	Presence	Notes	Images
Dadoxylon	Mbire District and Chirundu, Zimbabwe		

Callistophytaceae (Pteridospermopsida) of the Angwa Sandstone
Genus	Presence	Notes	Images
Lepidopteris	Manyima River, Mbire District, Zimbabwe		
Dicroidium	Manyima River, Mbire District, Zimbabwe		

Ginkgoales of the Angwa Sandstone
Genus	Presence	Notes	Images
Sphenobaiera	Manyima River, Mbire District, Zimbabwe		
