= Forest Sandstone =

Geologic formation in Southern Africa

- Stratigraphic range: Hettangian-Sinemurian; ~200–190 Ma
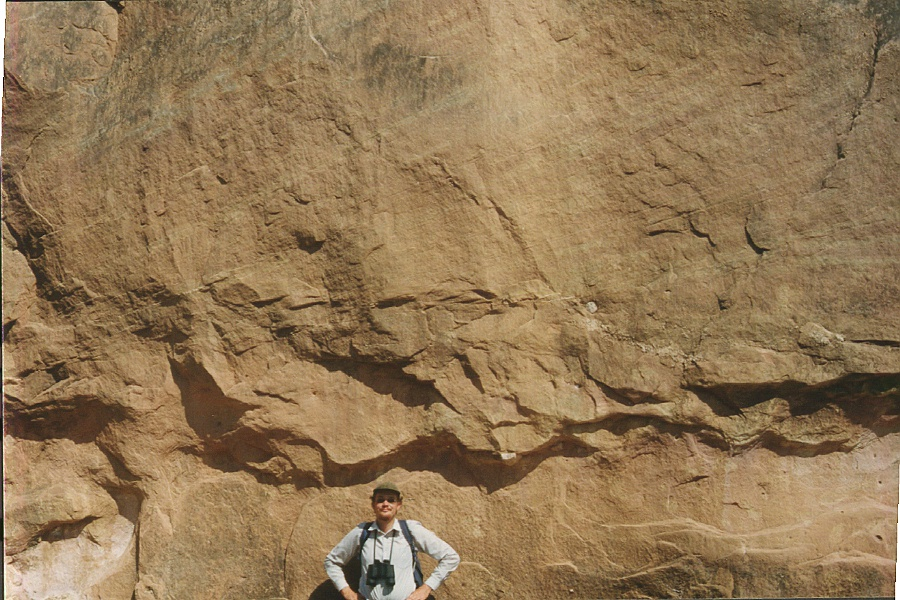
- Dune beds in the Forest Sandstone, Chewore Safari Area, Hurungwe District, Zimbabwe
- Type: Geological formation
- Unit of: Karoo Supergroup; Upper Karoo Group
- Underlies: Batoka Formation
- Overlies: Pebbly Arkose Formation

Lithology
- Primary: Sandstone

Location
- Coordinates: 20.0°S 28.4°E
- Approximate paleocoordinates: 35.0°S 5.1°E
- Region: South-central Africa
- Country: Botswana; Zambia; Zimbabwe

Type section
- Named for: Forests of Nyamandlovu District, Zimbabwe
- Named by: A.M. MacGregor, Zimbabwe Geological Survey
- Forest Sandstone (Zimbabwe)

The Forest Sandstone is a geological formation in southern Africa, dating to roughly between 200 and 190 million years ago and covering the Hettangian to Sinemurian stages of the Jurassic Period in the Mesozoic Era. As its name suggests, it consists mainly of sandstone.

Fossils of the prosauropod dinosaur Massospondylus and the primitive sauropod Vulcanodon have been recovered from the Forest Sandstone.

== Geology ==
=== Description ===
The formation is a sedimentary unit, consisting mainly of aeolian sands and silts with interbedded fluvial sediments, laid down during a period of increasing aridity.

=== Extent ===
The Forest Sandstone is found in Botswana, Zambia and Zimbabwe, in the Mid-Zambezi, Mana Pools, Cabora Bassa and Limpopo Basins, with its greatest thickness in the Cabora Bassa Basin.

=== Deposition ===
==== Age ====
The formation is dated at 200 to 190 Ma.

=== Stratigraphy ===
The Forest Sandstone is the penultimate formation in the Upper Karoo Group of the Karoo Supergroup, lying above the Pebbly Arkose Formation and below the Batoka Formation. In the Thuli Basin it is sometimes referred to as the Samkoto Formation.

The Forest Sandstone has been correlated to the Clarens Formation of the Great Karoo Basin in South Africa.

== Fossil content ==
=== Archosaurs ===
| Color key: Taxon / Reclassified taxon / Taxon falsely reported as present / Dubious taxon or junior synonym / Ichnotaxon / Ootaxon / Morphotaxon | Notes; Uncertain or tentative taxa are in small text; ~~crossed out~~ taxa are discredited. |

Protosuchia

Protosuchians of the Forest Sandstone Formation
| Genus | Species | Presence | Materials | Notes | Images |
|---|---|---|---|---|---|
| Protosuchidae | indeterminate | Geographically located in Matabeleland North, Zimbabwe. | | unknown protosuchid crocodile | |

Sphenodontia

Sphenodontians of the Forest Sandstone Formation
| Genus | Species | Presence | Materials | Notes | Images |
|---|---|---|---|---|---|
| Clevosaurus | indeterminate | Unspecified, Zimbabwe | | | |

==== Dinosaurs ====
| Color key: Taxon / Reclassified taxon / Taxon falsely reported as present / Dubious taxon or junior synonym / Ichnotaxon / Ootaxon / Morphotaxon | Notes; Uncertain or tentative taxa are in small text; ~~crossed out~~ taxa are discredited. |

Sauropodomorphia

Sauropodomorphs of the Forest Sandstone Formation
| Genus | Species | Presence | Materials | Notes | Images |
|---|---|---|---|---|---|
| Massospondylus | M. carinatus | Geographically located in Matabeleland North, Zimbabwe. | | a sauropodomorph | |
| Vulcanodon | V. karibaensis | Geographically located in the Bumi Hills area and the Sibilobilo Islands, in Kariba (District), Mashonaland West, Zimbabwe | Partial skeleton and scapula | A sauropodomorph | |
| Sauropodomorpha | Indeterminate | Geographically located in Matabeleland North, Zimbabwe. | | | |

Theropods

Theropods of the Forest Sandstone Formation
| Genus | Species | Presence | Materials | Notes | Images |
|---|---|---|---|---|---|
| Megapnosaurus | M. rhodesiensis | Geographically located in Nyamandhlovu area, Tsholotsho District, Matabeleland North, Zimbabwe. | | A coelophysid theropod, formally referred to as Syntarsus by Weishampel et al. | |

== Economic importance ==
=== Hydrogeology ===
The Forest Sandstone is the major groundwater-bearing unit of the Upper Karoo Group.
