= Pebbly Arkose Formation =

Geologic formation in southern Africa

Pebbly Arkose
- Stratigraphic range: Carnian-Early Norian; ~235–222 Ma
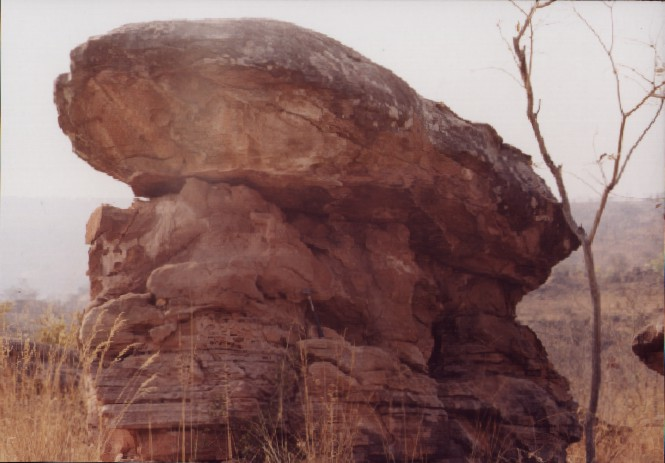
- Pebbly arkose outcrop, Ndepa hill, Kariba District, Zimbabwe
- Type: Geological formation
- Unit of: Upper Karoo Group, Karoo Supergroup
- Underlies: Forest Sandstone
- Overlies: Escarpment Grit & Angwa Sandstone

Lithology
- Primary: Sandstone

Location
- Coordinates: 16.2°S 30.3°E
- Approximate paleocoordinates: 50.8°S 11.9°E
- Region: Mashonaland Central & West
- Country: Botswana; Zambia; Zimbabwe

Type section
- Named for: Descriptive name
- Named by: A.M. MacGregor, Zimbabwe Geological Survey
- Pebbly Arkose Formation (Zimbabwe)

The Pebbly Arkose Formation is a Late Triassic geologic formation found in southern Africa.

== Geology ==
=== Description ===
The formation comprises mainly coarse, arkosic sandstones.

=== Extent ===
The Pebbly Arkose Formation is found in Botswana, Zambia and Zimbabwe, in the Mid-Zambezi, Mana Pools, Cabora Bassa and Limpopo basins.

=== Stratigraphy ===
The Pebbly Arkose Formation is part of the Upper Karoo Group, overlies the Escarpment formation (in the Mid-Zambezi and Limpopo basins) and the Angwa Sandstone Formation (in the Mana Pools and Cabora Bassa Basins) and underlies the Forest Sandstone Formation.

The Pebbly Arkose has been correlated to the Elliot Formation of the Great Karroo Basin, South Africa and the Mpandi Formation of the Thuli Basin in Botswana and Zimbabwe.

== Fossil content ==
=== Flora ===
Pinales of the Pebbly Arkose Formation
Taxa	Presence	Notes	Images
Form genus: Dadoxylon	Widespread in the formation		

=== Vertebrate fauna ===
==== Archosaur ====
Archosaurs of the Pebbly Arkose Formation
Taxon	Species	Presence	Materials	Notes	Images
Mbiresaurus	M. raathi	Dande Communal Land.	A complete partially-articulated skeleton.	An early member of Sauropodomorpha	
Musankwa	M. sanyatiensis	Spurwing Island.	An articulated partial right leg.	Unaysaurid sauropodomorph	
Musango	M. matusadonaensis	Musango Archosaur Site	Partial skeleton	Unaysaurid sauropodomorph	
Aetosaur	Indeterminate.				
Herrerasauridae indet.	Indeterminate	Dande Communal Land.			

==== Reptiles ====
Rhynchosauria of the Pebbly Arkose Formation
Taxon	Species	Presence	Materials	Notes	Images
Hyperodapedon		Dande, Mbire District, Zimbabwe			

==== Synapsids ====
Synapsida of the Pebbly Arkose Formation
Taxon	Species	Presence	Materials	Notes	Images
Dicynodontia	Indeterminate.			A possible dicynodont	
Gomphodontosuchine				A traversodontid cynodont.	

==== Fish ====
Fish of the Pebbly Arkose Formation
Taxon	Species	Presence	Materials	Notes	Images
Ferganoceratodus	F. edwardsi			A ceratodontiform lungfish	

== See also ==
- List of dinosaur-bearing rock formations
  - List of stratigraphic units with indeterminate dinosaur fossils
- List of fossiliferous stratigraphic units in Zimbabwe
- Geology of Zimbabwe
- Molteno Formation
