= Batoka Formation =

Geological formation in Southern Africa

- Stratigraphic range: Early Jurassic; ~180–179 Ma
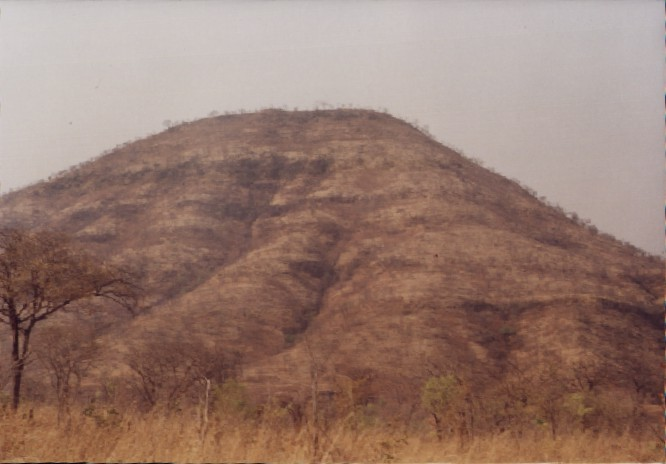
- Batoka basalt flows at Siyakobvu, Kariba District, Zimbabwe
- Type: Geological formation
- Unit of: Upper Karoo Group, Karoo Supergroup
- Overlies: Forest Sandstone Formation

Lithology
- Primary: Basalt

Location
- Region: Zambezi River valley
- Country: Botswana; Zambia; Zimbabwe

Type section
- Named for: Batoka Gorge, Zambezi River
- Named by: G.W. Lamplugh

The Batoka Formation is a geological formation in the Zambezi valley in Botswana, Zambia and Zimbabwe. It is predominantly a volcanic unit comprising mainly basalts. It was formerly thought to contain sand stones containing the dinosaur Vulcanodon, however this was shown to be in error resulting from interpreting folding of the rocks as separate layers, with the sandstone layers actually being from the underlying Forest Sandstone.

== Geology ==
=== Description ===
The formation is a volcanic unit, consisting mainly of high-titanium, low-potassium tholeiitic basalt flows.

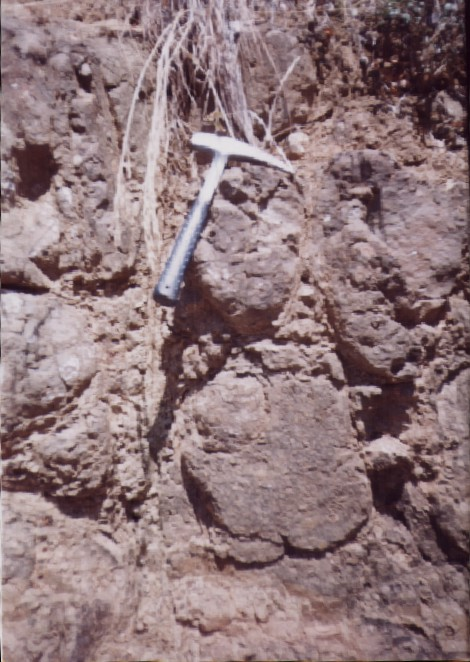
Pillow lavas in Batoka Basalt, Siyakobvu, Kariba District, Zimbabwe

The lavas are dark, vesicular and porphyritic or massive basalts, with occasional pillows, although rare dacites and rhyolites have been reported from some areas of north-eastern Botswana. The vesicular and massive basalts occur in alternating bands, with the vesicular bands usually being the top and base of each flow. The basalt mineralogy consists of mainly of plagioclase, augite, magnetite, some ilmenite and volcanic glass. In the Hwange area, vesicles consist mostly of quartz, chalcedony or calcite, though zeolites, such as stilbite, mesolite and laumontite, are dominant towards Victoria Falls and in the lower Deka valley, and are common in north-eastern Botswana.

The basalt lavas are related to carbonatite intrusions in the Zambezi valley.

=== Extent ===
The Batoka Formation is found in Botswana, Zambia, Zimbabwe, in the Mid-Zambezi, Mana Pools and Cabora Bassa Basins.

=== Age ===
Lavas of the Batoka Formation have been dated at 180 to 179 Ma.

=== Stratigraphy ===
The Batoka Formation is the uppermost formation in the Upper Karoo Group of the Karoo Supergroup, lying above the Forest Sandstone Formation.

The Batoka Formation has been correlated to the Drakensberg Group of the Great Karoo Basin, South Africa, and the basalts of the Tuli Basin in Botswana and Zimbabwe.
