= Escarpment Grit =

Triassic geologic formation in Africa

- Stratigraphic range: Early Triassic
- Type: Geological formation
- Unit of: Upper Karoo Group, Karoo Supergroup
- Underlies: Pebbly Arkose Formation
- Overlies: Lower Karoo Group

Lithology
- Primary: Gritstone
- Other: Sandstone

Location
- Country: Zambia, Zimbabwe

Type section
- Named for: Descriptive name
- Named by: A.M. MacGregor, Zimbabwe Geological Survey

The Escarpment Grit is a Triassic geologic formation. It is also referred to as the Nyoka Grit.

== Geology ==
The formation is composed of fluvial sediments, mainly gritstones and coarse sandstones. Uranium is present in the Escarpment Grit of southern Zambia.

== Stratigraphy ==
The Escarpment Grit Formation is the basal unit of the Upper Karoo Group and underlies the Pebbly Arkose Formation. It has been dated as Upper Scythian (Early Triassic).

The Pebbly Arkose has been correlated to the Angwa Sandstone Formation in the Mana Pools and Cabora Bassa Basins, and the Elliot Formation of the Great Karoo Basin, South Africa.

== Flora ==
Alisporites spores have been identified from the Escarpment Grit in north-western Zimbabwe.

== Hydrogeology ==
This formation constitutes a productive aquifer in north-western Zimbabwe, although of limited thickness.
