= ZGS =

ZGS may refer to:

- Zero Gradient Synchrotron – particle accelerator at Argonne National Laboratory, in operation 1964–79
- Zimbabwe Geological Survey
- ZGS Communications, a United States broadcasting company
- Chinese Sign Language, from name in Mandarin, Zhōngguó Shǒuyǔ.
- La Romaine Airport, with IATA code ZGS
