= Mbiresaurus =

Mbiresaurus Temporal range: Late Triassic (Carnian)

Scientific classification
- Kingdom: Animalia
- Phylum: Chordata
- Class: Reptilia
- Clade: Dinosauria
- Clade: Saurischia
- Clade: †Sauropodomorpha
- Genus: †Mbiresaurus; Griffin et al., 2022
- Species: †M. raathi

Binomial name
- †Mbiresaurus raathi Griffin et al., 2022

Genus of sauropodomorph dinosaurs

Mbiresaurus (meaning "Mbire reptile") is an extinct genus of basal sauropodomorph dinosaur from the Late Triassic (Carnian) Pebbly Arkose Formation of Zimbabwe. The genus contains a single species, Mbiresaurus raathi, known from a nearly complete skeleton. Mbiresaurus represents one of Africa’s earliest known definitive dinosaurs.

== Discovery and naming ==
VOA report about the discovery

The Mbiresaurus holotype specimen, NHMZ 2222, was discovered in two expeditions in 2017 and 2019 in layers of the Pebbly Arkose Formation on Dande Communal Land of Mbire District, Mashonaland Central Province, Zimbabwe, which dates to the late Carnian age of the late Triassic period. The holotype consists of a mostly complete, partially-articulated skeleton, including a partial skull and lower jaws, cervical, dorsal, sacral, and caudal vertebrae, fragments of ribs, partial pectoral and pelvic girdles, and partial forelimbs and hindlimbs. A larger referred specimen, NHMZ 2547, was found in association with the holotype.

In 2022, Griffin et al. described Mbiresaurus as a new genus and species of basal sauropodomorph. The generic name, "Mbiresaurus", combines a reference to the Mbire district of Zimbabwe with the Latin "sauros", meaning "reptile". The specific name, "raathi", honors Michael Raath, one of the discoverers of the fossils, and his contributions to Zimbabwean paleontology.

== Classification ==
In their phylogenetic analyses, Griffin et al. (2022) recovered Mbiresaurus as a basal member of Sauropodomorpha. The cladogram below displays the results of their phylogenetic analyses.

- Saurischia
  - Theropoda
  - Sauropodomorpha
    - - Eoraptor
      - - Guaibasaurus
        - Buriolestes
    - - Mbiresaurus
      - - Saturnalia
        - Pampadromaeus
        - - Panphagia
          - - Bagualosaurus
            - - Unaysaurus
              - - Riojasaurus
                - - - Plateosaurus
                    - - Efraasia
                      - - Thecodontosaurus
                        - Pantydraco
                  - - Coloradisaurus
                    - - - Yunnanosaurus
                        - - Aardonyx
                          - - - Pulanesaura
                              - - Vulcanodon
                                - Tazoudasaurus
                            - - Gongxianosaurus
                              - Antetonitrus
                      - - - Massospondylus kaalae
                          - Lufengosaurus
                        - - Massospondylus carinatus
                          - Leyesaurus

== Paleoenvironment ==
Mbiresaurus is known from the Pebbly Arkose Formation of Zimbabwe. Other fossils belonging to Hyperodapedon, as well as unnamed aetosaurs, herrerasaurids, and synapsids (possible dicynodont and gomphodontosuchine traversodontid cynodont) have also been recovered from the formation.
