= Caspary =

Caspary and Caspari are surnames. People with those names include:

- Alfred H. Caspary (1877–1955), American philatelist
- Anita Caspary (1915–2011), American nun who renounced her vows and founded a lay women's association
- Carl Paul Caspari (1814–92), Norwegian neo-Lutheran theologian and academic
- Daniel Caspary (born 1976), German politician
- David Caspari (1648–1702), German Lutheran theologian
- Ernst Caspari (1909–1988), German-American geneticist
- Georg Caspari (1683–1743), Baltic German academic, son of David Caspari
- Leopold Caspari (1830–1915), French-born American businessman and politician in Louisiana
- Robert Caspary (1818–87), German botanist

- Casparian strip, a feature of plant anatomy named after Robert Caspary

- Theodor Caspari (1853–1948), Norwegian poet, novelist, travel writer, literary critic and teacher
- Vera Caspary (1899–1987), American writer of novels, plays, screenplays and short stories
- Walter Caspari (1877–1962), German military officer, policeman, and leader of a Freikorps paramilitary unit

- Freikorps Caspari, a Freikorps unit named after Walter Caspari

== See also ==
- Caspari Aquilae (AKA Caspar Aquila, 1488–1560), German theologian and reformer
- Eleutherodactylus casparii, a species of frog known as Casparii
- Johannes Gijsbertus de Casparis (1916–2002), Dutch orientalist and indologist
- Casper (disambiguation)
- Gaspar (disambiguation)
- Kasper (disambiguation)
