= Upper Karoo Group =

Sequence of Triassic to Early Jurassic rocks in southern Africa

- Stratigraphic range: Early Triassic-Early Jurassic
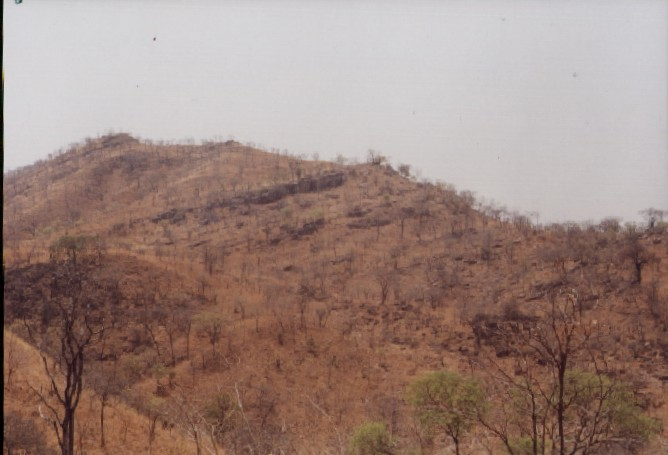
- Upper Karoo sequence at Siyakobvu, Kariba District, Zimbabwe (left to right: Batoka Formation, Forest Sandstone Formation, Pebbly Arkose Formation)
- Type: Geological group
- Unit of: Karoo Supergroup
- Sub-units: Escarpment Grit, Angwa Sandstone, Pebbly Arkose Formation, Forest Sandstone, Batoka Formation
- Overlies: Lower Karoo Group

Lithology
- Primary: Sandstone
- Other: Basalt, siltstone, mudstone

Location
- Country: Botswana; Zambia; Zimbabwe

The Upper Karoo Group is a sequence of Triassic to Early Jurassic sedimentary and volcanic rocks found in Botswana, Zambia, and Zimbabwe.

It comprises the Escarpment Grit (in the Mid-Zambezi and Limpopo basins) and the Angwa Sandstone (in the Mana Pools and Cabora Bassa Basins), overlain by the Pebbly Arkose Formation and the Forest Sandstone, capped by Batoka Formation basalts.

== See also ==
- Karoo Supergroup
