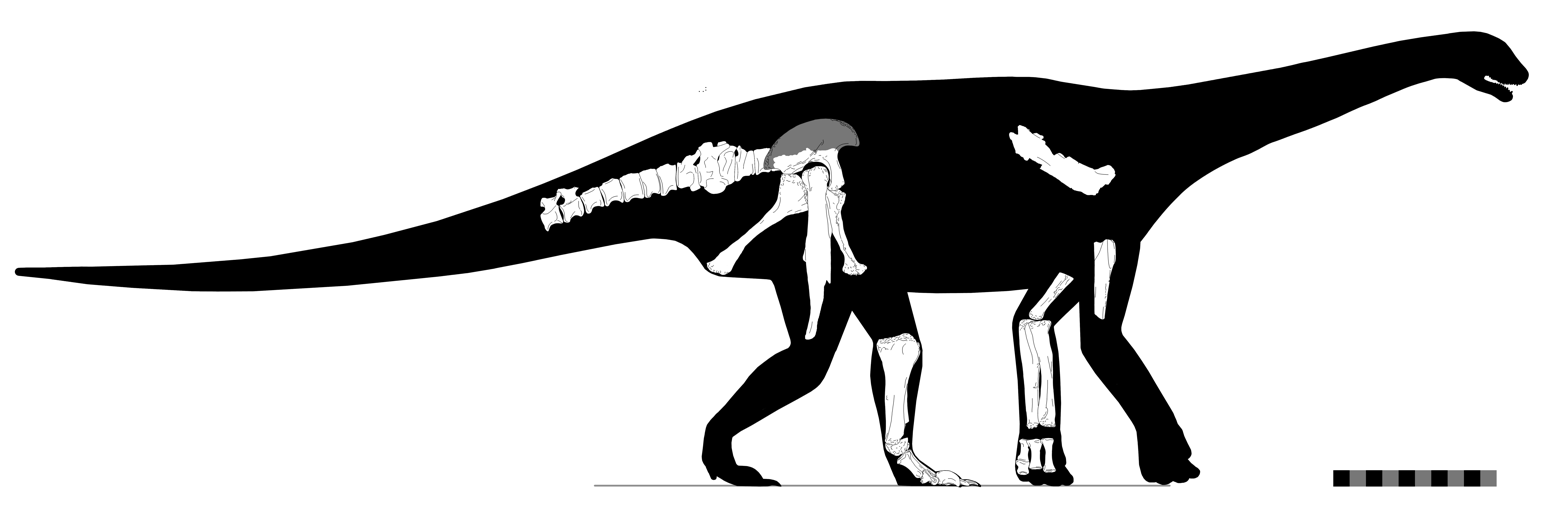
- Skeletal diagram showing the known remains

Scientific classification
- Kingdom: Animalia
- Phylum: Chordata
- Clade: Dinosauria
- Clade: Saurischia
- Clade: †Sauropodomorpha
- Clade: †Sauropoda
- Clade: †Gravisauria
- Family: †Vulcanodontidae
- Genus: †Vulcanodon; Raath, 1972

Type species
- †Vulcanodon karibaensis Raath, 1972

= Vulcanodon =

Vulcanodon Temporal range: Sinemurian-Pliensbachian, 199–188 Ma

Extinct genus of dinosaurs

Vulcanodon (meaning "volcano tooth") is an extinct genus of sauropod dinosaur from the Early Jurassic uppermost Forest Sandstone of southern Africa. The only known species is V. karibaensis. Discovered in 1969 in Zimbabwe, it was regarded as the earliest known sauropod for decades, and is still one of the most primitive genera that has been discovered.

As a quadrupedal, ground-dwelling herbivore, Vulcanodon already showed the typical sauropod body plan with column-like legs and a long neck and tail. It was smaller than most other sauropods, measuring approximately 11 metres (36 ft) in length. Vulcanodon is known from a fragmentary skeleton including much of the pelvic girdle, hindlimbs, forearms, and tail, but lacking the trunk and neck vertebrae as well as the skull. Originally, this genus was believed to be a "prosauropod" because of the knife-shaped teeth found near its fossils, which fit in with the idea that they were omnivorous. Scientists now know that the teeth belonged to an unidentified theropod that may have scavenged on the Vulcanodon carcass, which is now known to be a true sauropod. Upon the discovery of the related Tazoudasaurus, both animals were unified in the family Vulcanodontidae, although this has not been universally accepted.

== Description ==
Size comparison

Vulcanodon was initially thought have been a small sauropod. In 2010, Gregory S. Paul estimated its length at 11 metres (36.1 ft), its weight at 3.5 tonnes (3.9 short tons). Some books mention lower estimates of approximately 6.5 m (21 ft). However, in 2018, researchers have estimated a greater body mass of 10.3 metric tons (11.4 short tons). The thighbone was 110 centimetres (43 in) long.

As one of the earliest and basalmost sauropods, it is important for understanding the early evolution of this group. Sauropods descend from basal sauropodomorphs (informally called "prosauropods"), which were primitively bipedal (two-legged). While Vulcanodon already was fully quadrupedal (four-legged), its limb proportions were intermediate between those of its prosauropod ancestors and those of later, more derived sauropods. Its forelimbs were much more similar to later sauropods than basal sauropodomorphs because they are straight, much more gracile, and the proximal end of the ulna is v-shaped. Unfortunately, no skull or neck of Vulcanodon is known, although it is otherwise very well known.

=== Hindlimbs and pelvis ===
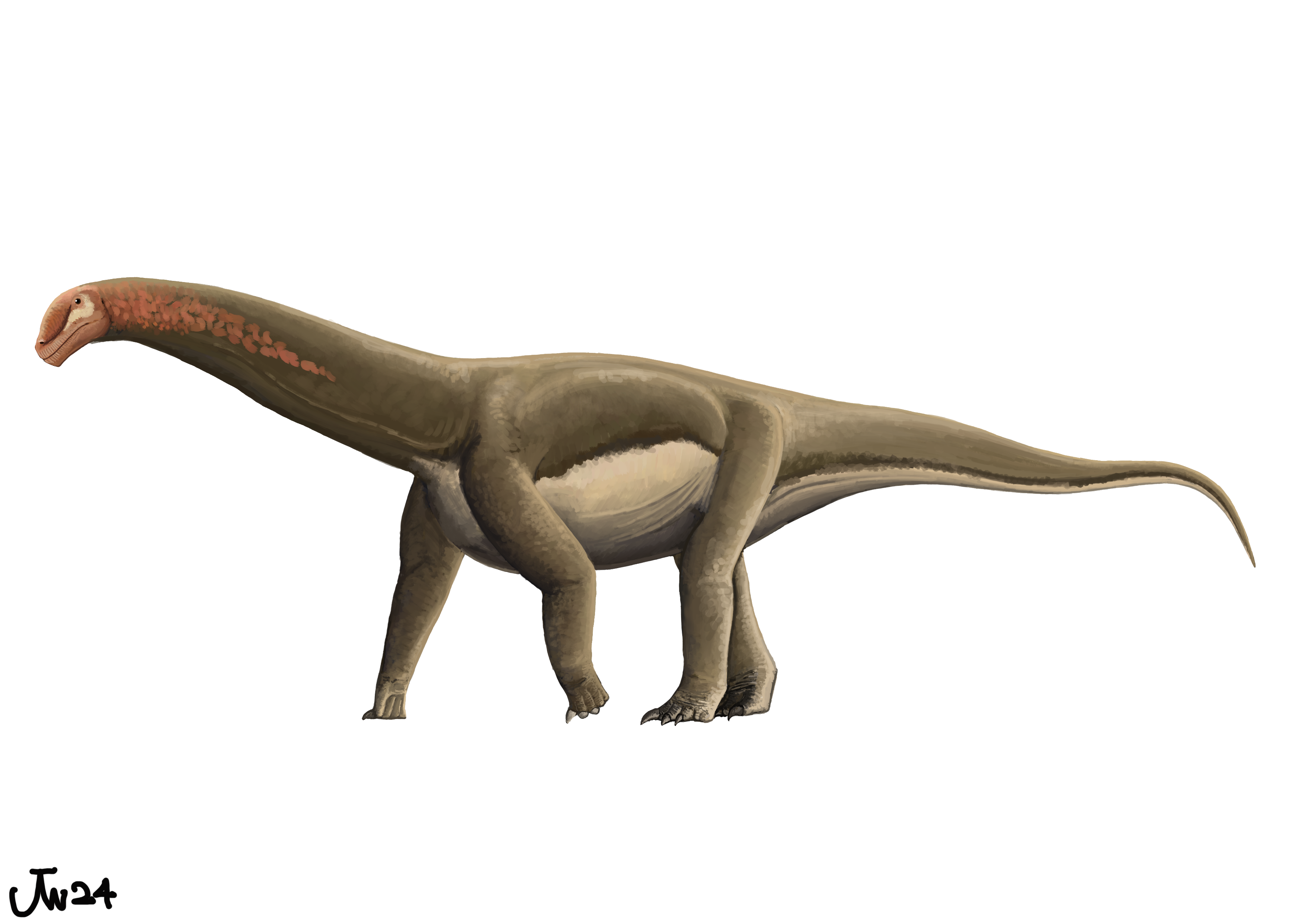
Life restoration

Vulcanodon's limbs were sturdy and column-like, and its forelimbs were already proportionally long, reaching 76% of hindlimb length. Its lower leg, metatarsus, and toes were shortened in comparison to its bipedal ancestors, but still not as short as in later sauropods. The sacrum was made out of four fused sacral vertebrae; "prosauropods" possessed only three sacrals. The tail vertebra bodies already showed an incipient excavation of their lateral sides, saving weight and giving them a waisted appearance when viewed from below. In later sauropods, this excavations were enlarged to form extensive perforated pockets called pleurocoels. Contrasting the many sauropod-like features of the skeleton, the pelvis was relatively primitive, reminiscent of its "prosauropod" ancestors. One such feature is that the brevis shelf of the ilium has a fossa, which is not found in any more derived sauropods.

The hallux (the first toe of the foot) showed a large claw that was flattened laterally, as seen in "prosauropods". However, the claws of the second and third toe were unusual in being nail-like and broader than deep. This feature was also found in the probably closely related Tazoudasaurus, but is absent in all other sauropods. The feet of Vulcanodon were semiplantigrade as in later sauropods (where both the digits and part of the metatarsals contact the ground), a derived feature not found in more basal sauropods like Isanosaurus. However, they also retained primitive features, like the fact that the phalanges were not reduced.

Many of the features found in sauropods that basal sauropodomorphs lack are related to the change in body size. The greatest regions affected by this are the hind limbs and pelvis. For example, an elongating of the ilium, size reduction of the lesser trochanter shelf, and semiplantigrade posture are some features that indicate the amount and positioning of leg muscles being modified. Vulcanodon possessed these features, the latter of which is seen earliest in it. However, Vulcanodon does not have reduced distal phalanges, which are seen in Shunosaurus and all more derived sauropods. This means that while the muscle positioning of its legs were changing, they had not yet reduced in the distal region of the limb.

== Discovery ==
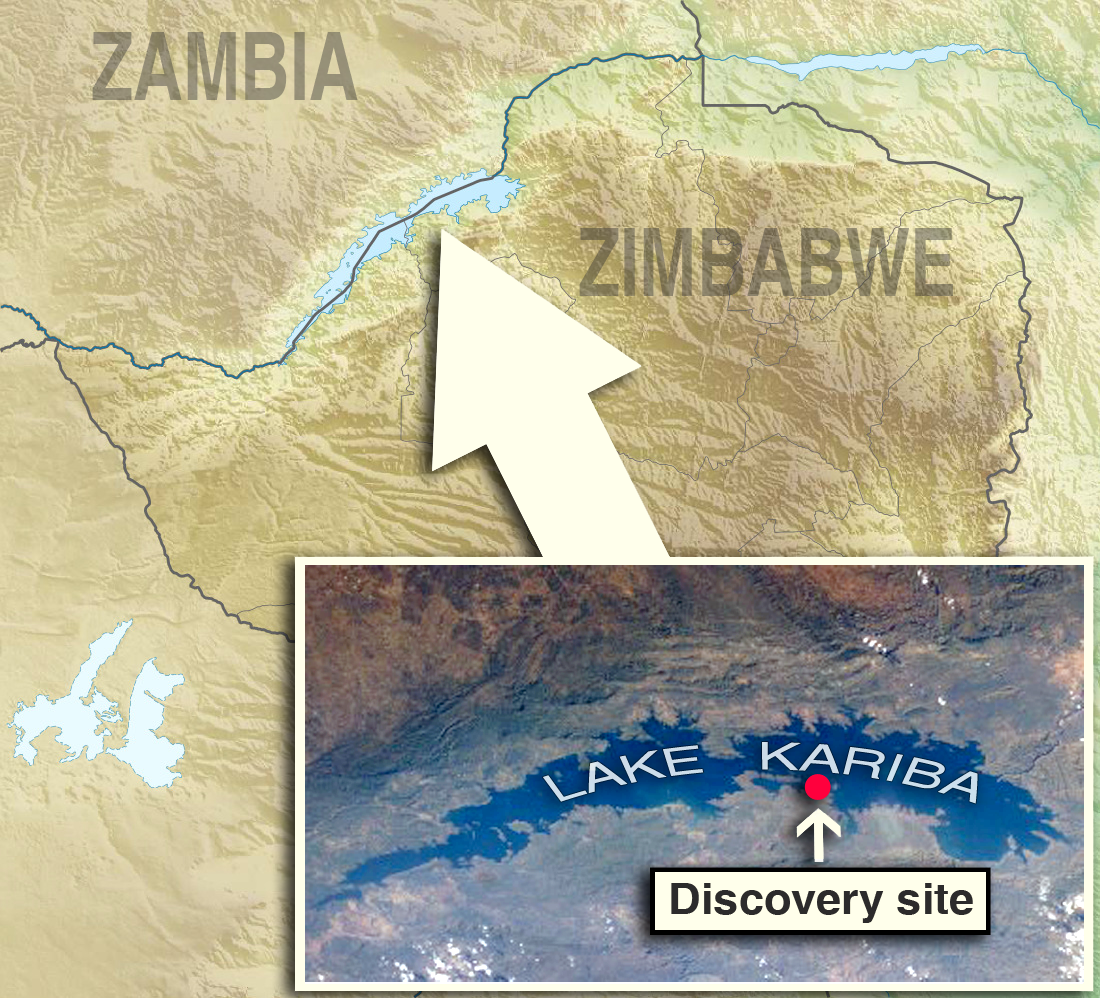
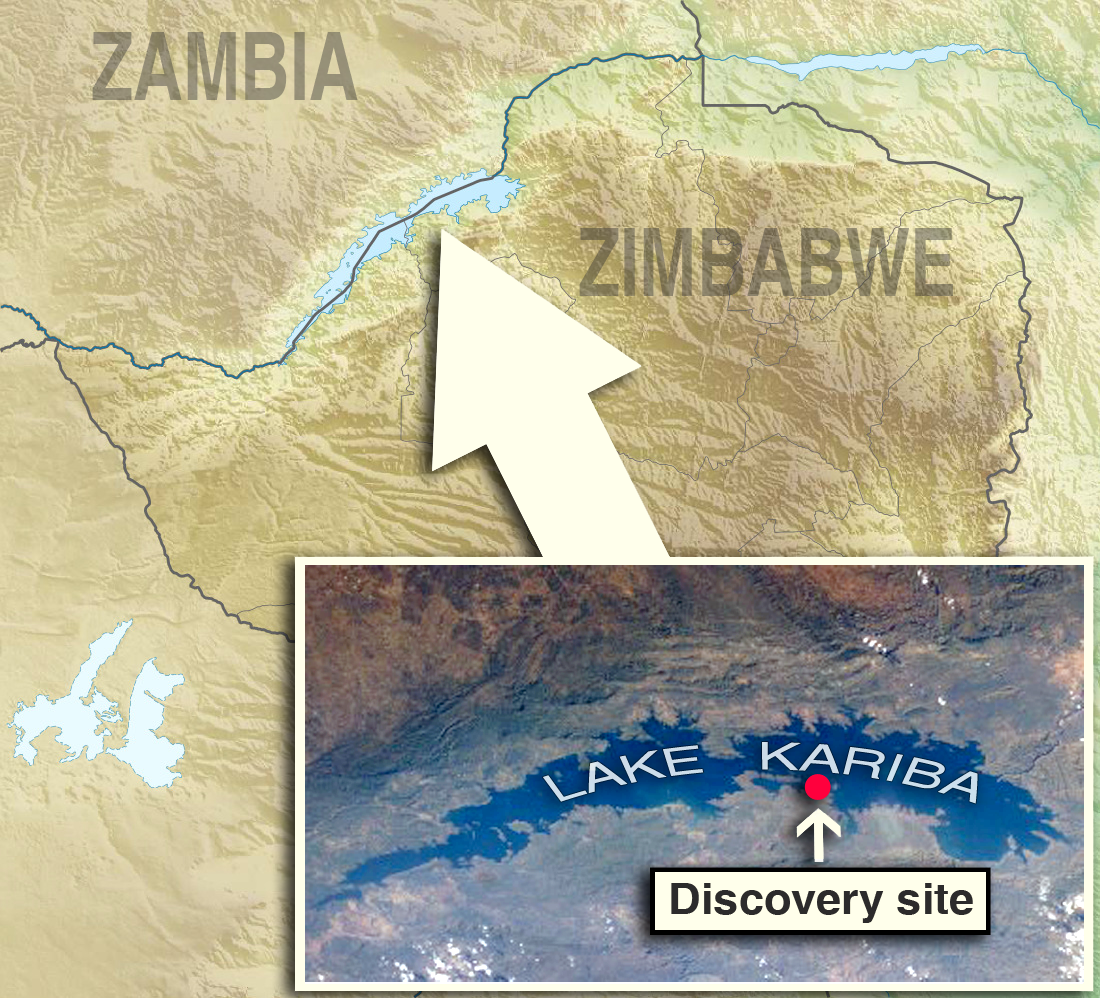
Location of the discovery site on "Island 126/127" in Lake Kariba, Zimbabwe

Vulcanodon is known only from a single locality on an island in Lake Kariba, the largest artificial lake in the world, in northern Zimbabwe (formerly Rhodesia). The island, located west of Bumi Hills, is called "Island 126/127", after early, unpublished lake charts, but has no formal name. The first bone was found by B. A. Gibson of the town of Kariba in July 1969, and an excavation team collected the specimen in October 1969, March 1970 and May 1970. In the later half of 1970, the new find was presented at a scientific symposium in Cape Town and a brief note was published. The find was formally named and described in July 1972 by paleontologist Michael Raath. The name Vulcanodon (lat. Vulcanus – Roman god of fire; gr. odon – "tooth") points to the fact that the skeleton was found in sandstone, that was at the time misinterpreted to be part of the Batoka Formation but is actually part of the Forest Sandstone lays a few metres below the lava flows of the Batoka Formation, and emphasizes the peculiar knife-shaped teeth that are now known to belong to a theropod. The specific name, karibaensis, refers to the place of discovery on a small island in Lake Kariba. It was one of the first dinosaurs found in Zimbabwe.

The skeleton (catalogue number QG24) has been found weathering out of a hill slope and was partially eroded by surface exponation and plant roots, erroneously documented as sandwiched between two basalt layers. It includes the pelvis and sacrum, most of the left hind limb and foot, a right thigh bone, and twelve anterior tail vertebrae. These remains pertain to a single individual as they were all found articulated (still connected together). Additionally, several disarticulated bones were found, including the right forearm and some metacarpalia and phalanges from both the right and left forefeet, probably also pertaining to this individual. Later, the site was revisited by the scientists Geoffrey Bond and Michael Cooper, who were able to collect additional remains including a scapula (specimen QG152, a shoulder blade) and a fragment of a neck vertebra. These remains show that more than one individual was present, and it is possible that they do not pertain to Vulcanodon at all. Today, the Vulcanodon remains are stored in the Natural History Museum of Zimbabwe in Bulawayo.

Raath (1972) noted the discovery of nine fragmentary carnivorous teeth near the pelvic region of the skeleton. He argued that the Vulcanodon carcass might have been embedded with the head and neck bended backwards above the pelvis, a posture called death pose that is frequently seen in dinosaur skeletons. The teeth would have been the only preserved elements of the skull. However, as shown by Cooper (1984), these teeth do not pertain to Vulcanodon but to a theropod dinosaur that may have scavenged on the Vulcanodon carcass.

== Classification ==
- Sauropoda
  - Antetonitrus
  - - Gongxianosaurus
    - - Isanosaurus
      - Gravisauria
        - Vulcanodontidae
          - Vulcanodon
          - Tazoudasaurus
        - Eusauropoda
          - Barapasaurus
          - Patagosaurus
          - - Omeisauridae
              - Omeisaurus
              - Mamenchisaurus
            - Neosauropoda

Basal sauropod phylogeny, simplified after Allain and Aquesbi, 2008

Originally, Michael Raath (1972) described Vulcanodon not as a sauropod but as an advanced, specialized prosauropod, possibly of the family Melanorosauridae. According to Raath, the sauropod-like limb proportions in Vulcanodon evolved independently from those of true sauropods (through convergent evolution). He argued that primitive features of the pelvis as well as the knife-shaped teeth preclude a classification within the Sauropoda. The teeth, however, are now known to belong to a theropod. Arthur Cruickshank (1975) was the first to show that Vulcanodon was indeed a sauropod, arguing that the fifth metatarsal bone was equally long as the remaining metatarsals, a condition seen in other sauropods but not in prosauropods. Today, Vulcanodon is universally accepted to be one of the most basal (primitive) members of Sauropoda.

Michael Cooper (1984) erected a new family, the Vulcanodontidae, which he regarded as the "rootstock" for later sauropod families. Originally, the Vulcanodontidae included Vulcanodon and the Indian Barapasaurus, but subsequent studies attributed a number of other, much more fragmentary early sauropod genera to this family, including Ohmdenosaurus and Zizhongosaurus. Paul Upchurch (1995) showed that Barapasaurus was more closely related to later, more advanced sauropods than to Vulcanodon, rendering the Vulcanodontidae polyphyletic and therefore invalid.

The exact relationships with other basal sauropod genera remain unclear. Ronan Allain and colleagues (2004, 2008) found that Vulcanodon is most closely related to Tazoudasaurus, a newly discovered sauropod genus from Morocco. These researchers suggested reintroducing the name Vulcanodontidae to name the clade containing Vulcanodon and Tazoudasaurus. However, this sibling relationship between Tazoudasaurus and Vulcanodon could not be confirmed by other analyses.

Adam Yates (2004) described a single sauropod tail vertebra from the Upper Elliot Formation of South Africa that may belong to a genus closely related to Vulcanodon. The Upper Elliot Formation is famous for its abundant fossils of the prosauropod Massospondylus.

Vulcanodon in a cladogram after Nair et al., 2012:

- Gravisauria
  - Vulcanodon
  - - - Tazoudasaurus
      - Spinophorosaurus
    - - Barapasaurus
      - - Rhoetosaurus
        - Eusauropoda
          - Shunosaurus
          - - Patagosaurus
            - - Omeisaurus
              - - Mamenchisaurus
                - Turiasauria
                  Losillasaurus
                - - Haplocanthosaurus
                  - Neosauropoda

== Paleoecology ==
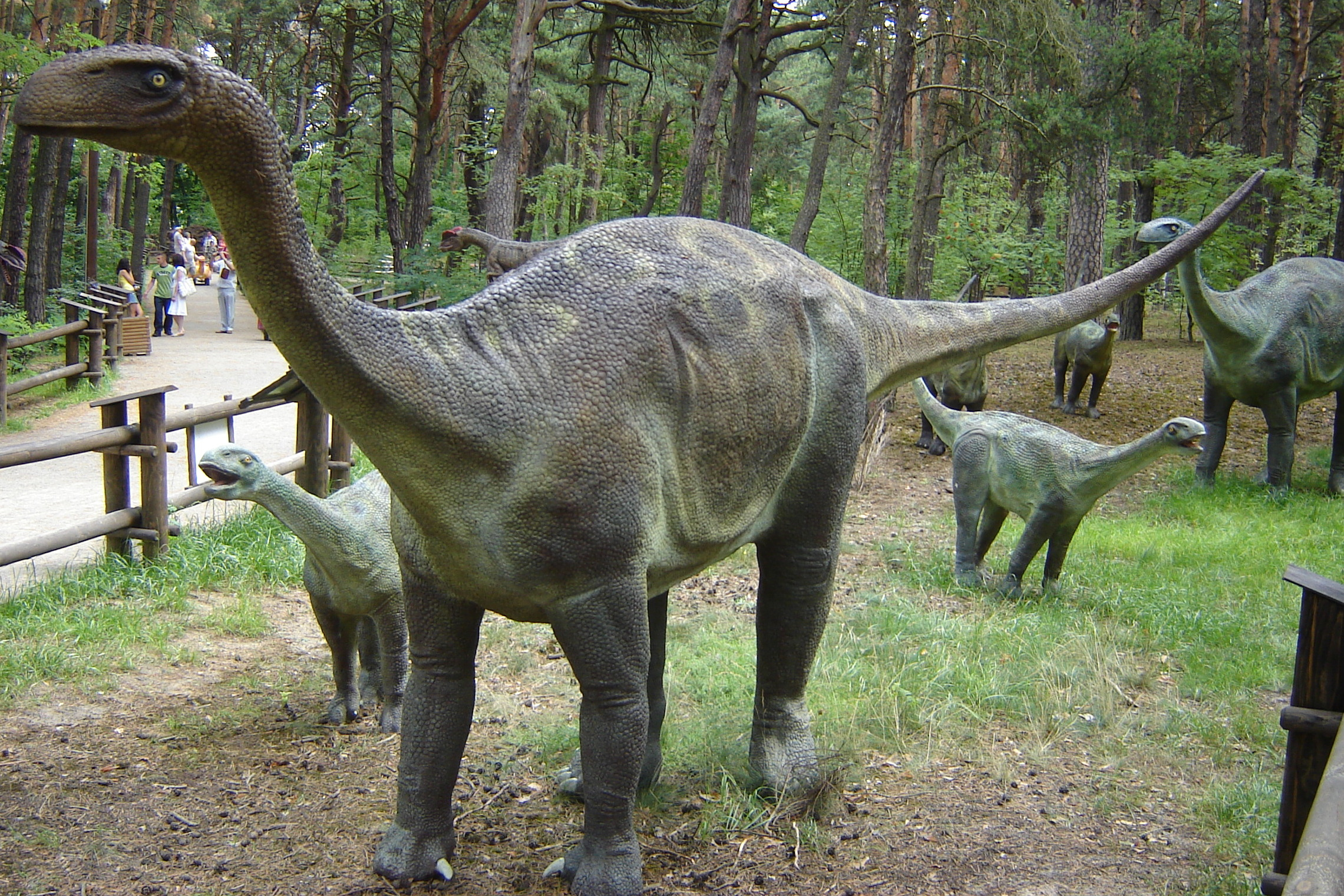
Models of a herd in the JuraPark in Solec Kujawski, Poland

During the later part of the Lower Jurassic, southern Africa was the scene of massive volcanism, resulting in extensive lava flows (so called flood basalts) that covered much of southern Africa and Antarctica. These basalt formations are known as the Karoo-Ferrar large igneous province. Vulcanodon comes from the "Vulcanodon beds", a fossil-bearing sediment unit within the Batoka Formation, which is composed primarily of flood basalts. The skeleton was found near the top of a 30-metre-thick (98 ft) bedded layer of sand- and siltstone that is over- and underlain by flood basalts.

It was long assumed that Vulcanodon lived during the lowermost (earliest) part of the Jurassic (the Hettangian stage) or at the Triassic–Jurassic boundary, approximately 200 million years ago. Therefore, it was regarded as the earliest sauropod known, until the discovery of the even older Late Triassic Isanosaurus was announced in 2000. Adam Yates (2004) has recently shown that Vulcanodon is actually much younger than previously thought, dating to the uppermost (latest) part of the Lower Jurassic during the Toarcian stage, approximately 175–183 million years ago. Thus, it is contemporary to the closely related Tazoudasaurus. As was assumed that the locality of Vulcanodon itself cannot be dated radiometrically because of weathering of the lavas, it would roughly be a contemporary to Karoo lavas from other localities, as the entire sequence of volcanic eruptions was finished within one million years. In 2018 was revelated that as in 2016 Lake Kariba hosted record-low water levels the unit were accessible to be studied and confirmed that the holotype came from the uppermost Forest Sandstone, being as old as the Rhaetian or as young as the Pliensbachian, with a Sinemurian-Pliensbachian Midpoint.

Vulcanodon is the only named dinosaur from the Vulcanodon beds. Cooper (1984) noted that the habitat was desert-like, as indicated by aeolian (wind-blown) sands of the Forest Sandstone Formation, which underlies the "Vulcanodon beds". The sediments in which Vulcanodon was found may represent distal alluvial fan deposits which levelled off into a desert landscape, which may have contained lakes during the wet season. The individual may have roamed the shores of wadis that cut into the alluvial fan deposits, unless the carcass was transported to the locality it was found by flooding.

Initially, sauropods were thought to be mainly aquatic, inhabiting lush peat swamps and being captive to the buoyancy of water to support their giant body weights. In 1984, Cooper pointed out that Vulcanodon, the most primitive sauropod known at that time, lived in a desert like environment and therefore must have been terrestrial. This indicated that the large body size of sauropods, as already seen in Vulcanodon, had not evolved as an adaptation to an aquatic life style.
