= Drakensberg Group =

Jurassic geological group in Lesotho and South Africa

- Stratigraphic range: Lower Jurassic; ~182–180 Ma
- Type: Geologic group
- Sub-units: Barkly East Formation, Lesotho Formation
- Overlies: Stormberg Group
- Thickness: up to 22,965.88 feet (7,000 m)

Lithology
- Primary: Basalt

Location
- Region: Eastern Cape, KwaZulu-Natal, Free State, and Lesotho
- Country: South Africa, Lesotho

Type section
- Named for: Drakensberg mountains
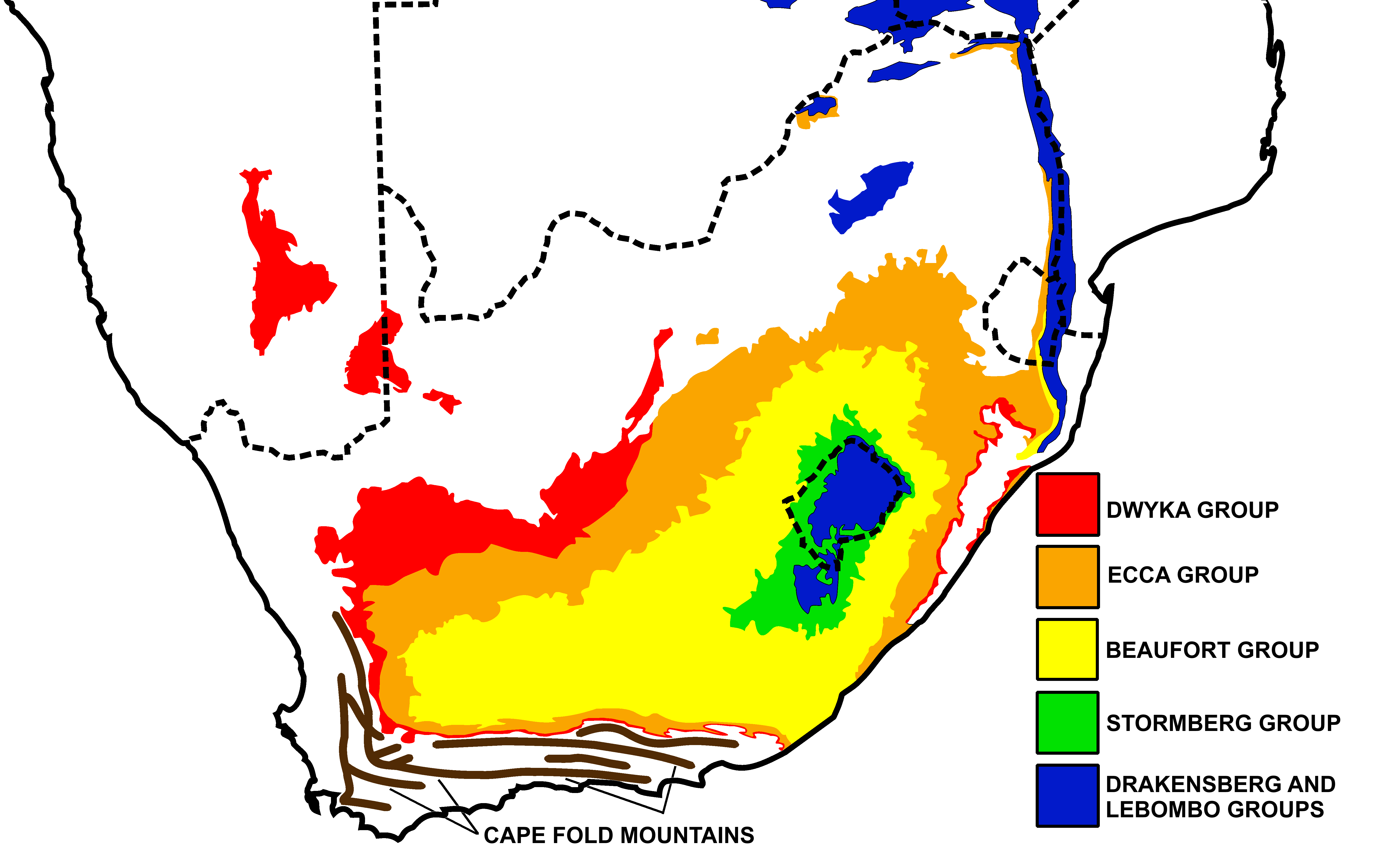
- A simplified geological map of the outcrops of Karoo Supergroup rocks in Southern Africa. The Drakensberg Group is represented by the blue key on the map.

The Drakensberg Group is a geological group named after the Drakensberg mountain range where in its uppermost sections the rocks are found. The Drakensberg Group lies over most of Lesotho and localities in the Eastern Cape, KwaZulu-Natal, and Free State provinces of South Africa. It forms part of the greater Karoo Igneous Province, which occurs over an extensive area of southern Africa.

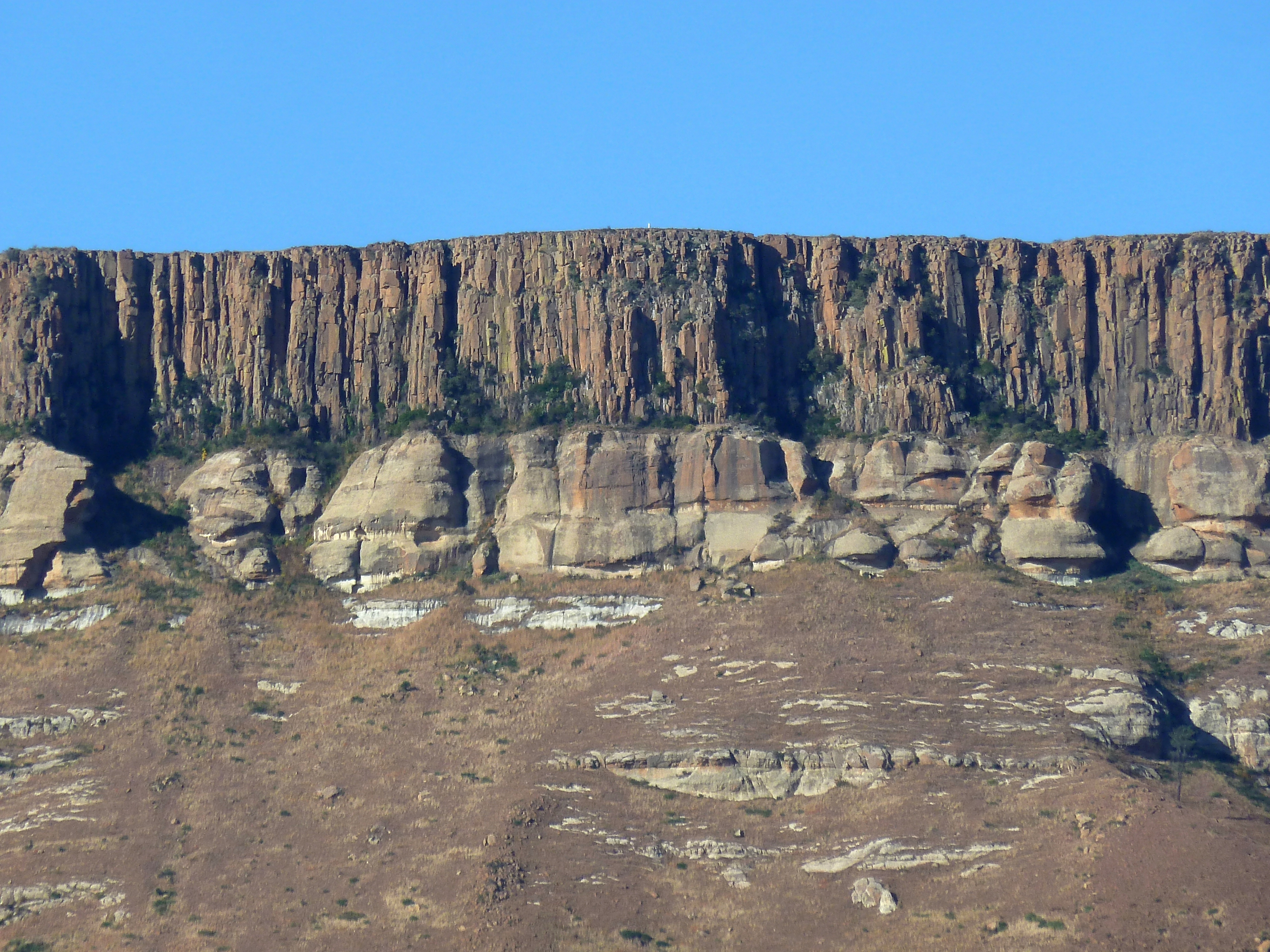
Steep, fluted Drakensberg basalt (not dolerite) with typical uniform, vertical crack-lines, deposited on cave sandstone of the Clarens formation along the western limit of Platberg, Harrismith, Free State

== Background ==
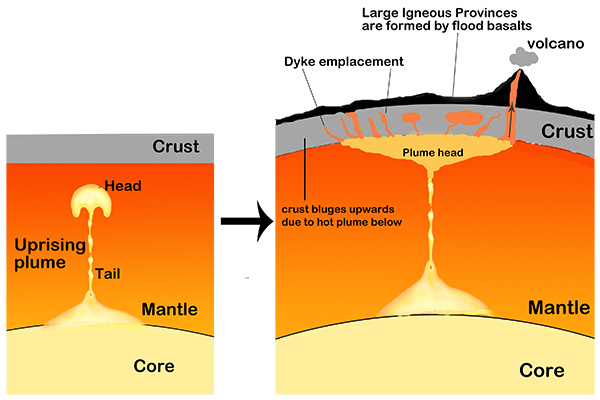
Diagram detailing how a large igneous province is formed

The Drakensberg Group was formed approximately 182 million years ago during the early Jurassic period. Rifting tectonics in response to the breakup of the supercontinent Gondwana are believed to have been the cause for the formation of the Drakensberg Group. Networks of hyperbyssal (shallow intrusives) dikes and sills represent the conduits through the crust that brought basaltic and andesitic lava to the surface, and caused the formation of the extrusive flood basalts of the Drakensberg Group. The dikes and sills are preserved throughout the Karoo Basin, and have served as a weathering barrier for much of the Karoo Supergroup rocks.

The Drakensberg Group comprises minor sedimentary (i.e. sandstones, lapilli deposits, pyroclastic deposits, and igneous (i.e. continental flood basalt/andesite sequences, shallow intrusive dikes and sills, and diatremes) and is part of the greater volcanic extrusive rock sequences of the Karoo Igneous Province. In its entirety, the Karoo Igneous Province represents a vast suite of sedimentary, extrusive and intrusive rocks ranging from 200 - 130 million years in age. Past studies have shown that there are major geochemical changes in the provinces from the north and the south. The provinces of the central to southern areas are composed of Titanium - Zirconium low (Ti-Zr) tholeiitic basalt, and andesitic compositions also occur.

The Drakensberg Group has been subdivided into two recognized geological formations. While both formations are composed of tholeiitic basalt, they have minor geochemical differences. The two formations are listed below (from oldest to youngest):

- Barkly East Formation: This formation is the only formation of the Drakensberg Group to contain sedimentary units. These sedimentary units are composed of sandstones, lapilli deposits, and pyroclastic deposits. They are only found in the lower sections and are interbedded with basalts.
- Lesotho Formation: Composed entirely of tholeiitic basalts. However, in some parts of Lesotho pillow lava basalts are found which means these basalts had extruded out as lava underwater (subaqueous extrusion) into large lakes.

== Geographic extent ==
The Drakensberg Group lavas compose the upper levels of the entire Drakensberg mountain range. The lavas stretch out over most of Lesotho and into the northeastern Eastern Cape, the southern Free State, and eastern KwaZulu-Natal provinces of South Africa. Basalt provinces of the same low Ti-Zr chemical composition as the Drakensberg lavas are found in the Springbok Flats province in Limpopo, and other basalt sub-outcrops are found in eastern Botswana and central Namibia. These occurrences suggest that the Drakensberg Group lavas once covered a vast area over southern Africa. In addition, basalt xenoliths of the same chemical structure as the Drakensberg lavas have been found in the Northern Cape within Cretaceous-aged kimberlite pipes (~ 90 Ma) that intruded older rocks of the Karoo Supergroup. In the Lesotho highlands and the highest sections of the Drakensberg mountain range, only erosional remnants of the Drakensberg lavas remain.

== Correlation ==
The Drakensberg Group is part of the greater Mesozoic-aged Karoo Igneous Province of southern Africa and the Ferrar Large Igneous Province of Antarctica (Karoo-Ferrar). The Kirwan basalts of Antarctica particularly resemble the Drakensberg Group, because Antarctica was close to the southern Lebombo province before the break up of Gondwana. The Drakensberg basalts are geochemically identical to the Springbok Flats volcanics. It was thought for some time that the Drakensberg volcanics were associated with the Parana Igneous Province of Brazil and the Etendeka Province in northern Namibia. However, these provinces have since been dated some 50 million years younger than the Karoo-Ferrar provinces.
