= Matusadona National Park =

National park in Zimbabwe

- Location within Zimbabwe
- Location: Zimbabwe
- Coordinates: 16°57′S 28°36′E
- Area: 1,400 km^{2} (540 sq mi)
- Established: 1975

Matusadona National Park is a national park in northern Zimbabwe situated on the southern shore of Lake Kariba. The park takes its name from the local Matuzviadonha Hills.

== History ==
Matusadona was proclaimed a non-hunting area on 7 November 1958 before being declared as a Game Reserve in 1963, and then in 1975 it became a National Park, under the Parks & Wildlife Act of Rhodesia. Matusadona National Park covers 1,400 km^{2} (540 sq mi) of flat plains and rugged mountains protecting a diverse flora and fauna. Its area encompasses a combination of pristine and rugged wilderness, which was very inaccessible before the Kariba Dam was built and Lake Kariba created. The creation of the lake caused profound ecological changes. In particular, the availability of grazing on the lakeshore has contributed to an increase in the populations of large mammals in the park, especially elephant and Cape buffalo. The species of grass growing on the shoreline is Panicum repens which grows as long as the lake levels fluctuate bringing nutrients to the shore. This source of grazing has allowed populations of large grazers such as Cape buffalo, waterbuck, common zebra, and impala to thrive, attracting the associated predators. Matusadona National Park is an Intensive Protection Zone (IPZ) and home to several relocated rhinoceros.

== Ecology and management ==
Matusadona National Park includes three distinct ecological areas. The first is Lake Kariba and its shoreline grasslands, the second is the floor of the Zambezi Valley, with its thick jesse, Combretum celastroides, thickets and mopane woodland, and; third, the Escarpment area of Julbernardia and Brachystegia woodlands. The woodlands do not have much grass but provide habitat for browsers, most notably the black rhinoceros. Elephants can be found throughout the park, seeking shade under the canopy of jesse during the heat of the day.

From the floor of the Zambezi valley the escarpment rises some 700 metres (2,300 ft) and is extremely rugged. Elephant browsing and fire depredations have, in recent years, caused the once substantial woodlands to decrease allowing grassland to develop. This led to the park managers deciding that it was necessary to take control measures to reduce the elephant population and to carry out early burning programmes in the upper escarpment, to reduce the risk of later, hotter fires from causing serious damage to the trees. These programmes have been effective as demonstrated by regrowth apparent in the Escarpment area.

Within a 450 km^{2} (170 sq mi) area there was +100 lions feeding on a bounty of Cape buffalo. The buffalo began to disappear after losing vital grazing areas to a rise in the level of Lake Kariba upon which the park is set on. This in turn saw the lions begin to decline. By 2004 a study estimated a mere 28 lions remained in the area but no research was available on their viability and/or any other threats the population may be facing. The population is still remaining at a low density and is therefore susceptible to a variety of environmental and human induced pressures. Other mammals found include leopard, warthog, greater kudu and bushbuck.

=== African Parks ===
In November 2019 management of Matusadona National Park was assumed by African Parks, in partnership with Zimbabwe Parks and Wildlife Management Authority, because of the deteriorated condition of the park due to rampant poaching.

== Facilities ==
The following campsites are within the Matusadona National Park: Tashinga Camp, Sanyati Camp and Changachirere Camp, as well as undeveloped bush camps at Jenje and Kanjedza for up to a maximum of 10 persons per camp. There are also what are termed exclusive campsites at Ume, Muuyu, Mbalabala, Maronga, and Kautsiga.

== Access ==
There is a small, 800-metre (2,600 ft) landing strip available at Tashinga Camp which can take small aircraft. Many visitors access the park by boat either from Bumi Hills or Kariba town. It has relatively poor accessibility by road and an extremely harsh internal network of roads keep the crowds and traffic low. The roads are closed in the rainy season.
