= Theodor Caspari =

Norwegian writer

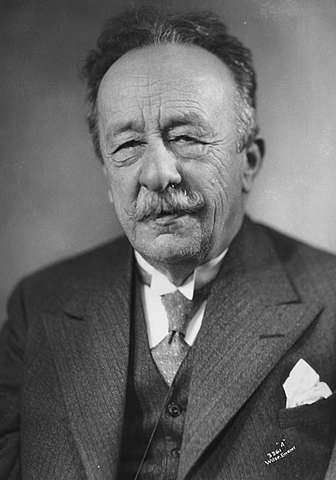
Theodor Caspari in 1933.

Theodor Caspari (13 February 1853 – 12 February 1948) was a Norwegian poet, novelist, travel writer, literary critic and teacher.

He was the son of Carl Paul Caspari. He made his literary début in 1880 with the poetry collection Polemiske Sonetter. Among his other works are Norsk Høifjeld from 1898 and Vintereventyr from 1901.
