= Mbire District =

- second-level administrative subdivision
- Country: Zimbabwe
- Province: Mashonaland Central

Area
  - Total: 4,696 km^{2} (1,813 sq mi)

Population (2022 census)
  - Total: 83,720
  - Density: 17.83/km^{2} (46.17/sq mi)
- Time zone: UTC+1 (CET)
  - Summer (DST): UTC+1 (CEST)

Mbire District is a district of the Province Mashonaland Central in Zimbabwe. It is the namesake of the early dinosaur Mbiresaurus, which was discovered in Mbire District.
