= Lower Karoo Group =

Sequence of sandstone sedimentary rocks in Africa

- Stratigraphic range: Late Carboniferous-Permian
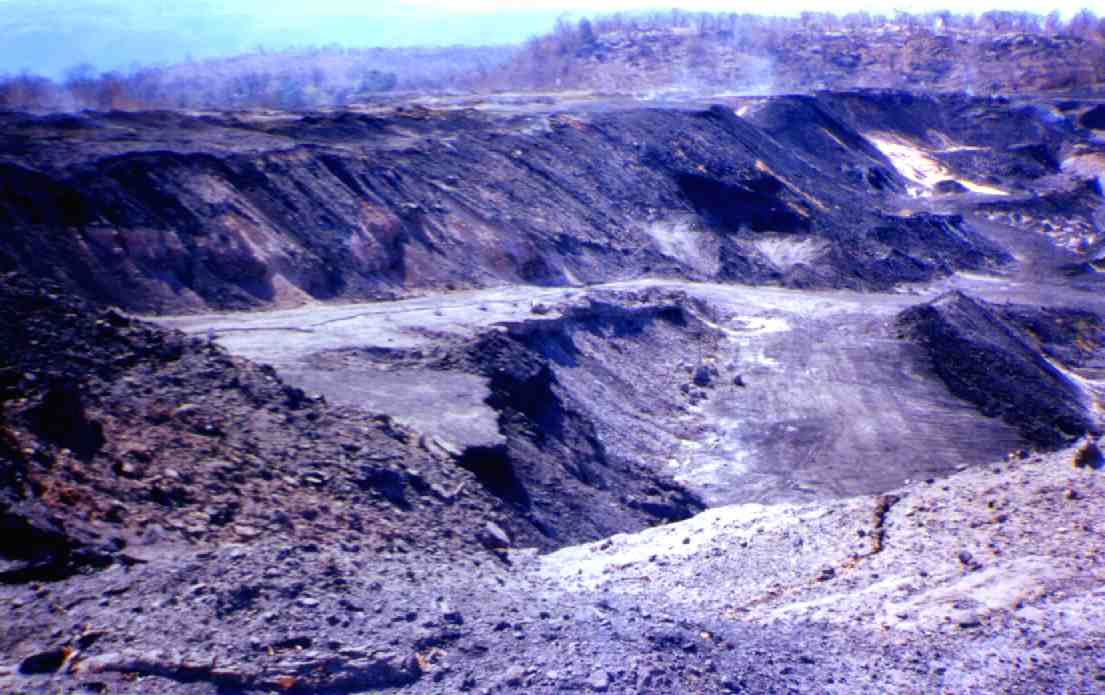
- Opencast coal mine in Upper Karoo sequence at Sengwa, Gokwe North District, Zimbabwe)
- Type: Geological group
- Unit of: Karoo Supergroup
- Underlies: Upper Karoo Group

Lithology
- Primary: Sandstone
- Other: Coal, tillite, siltstone, mudstone

Location
- Country: Botswana; Mozambique; Zambia; Zimbabwe

The Lower Karoo Group is a sequence of late Carboniferous and Permian sandstone sedimentary rocks of the Karoo Supergroup, found in Botswana, Zambia, Zimbabwe, and Mozambique.

== Geology ==
The Lower Karoo corresponds to the lower portion of the Karoo Supergroup sequence. The basal unit comprises glacial tillites, being the Dwyka Formation in the Mid-Zambezi Basin, Basal Beds in the Limpopo basins and Kondo Pools Formation in the Mana Pools and Cabora Bassa Basins. These are overlain in the Mid-Zambezi by the Wankie sandstones and coal and the Madumabisa Mudstone

It is overlain and overstepped by the Upper Karoo Group.

In the Mana Pools and Cabora Bassa Basins, the Kondo Pools Formation is overlain by the Mkanga Formation sandstone and mudstones.

== See also ==
- Karoo−related topics
- Paleozoic Africa
- Sandstone formations
