= Karoo Supergroup =

Late Paleozoic-early Mesozoic stratigraphic unit in Africa

Stratigraphy of the Karoo Supergroup in the Karoo Basin
| Period | Group | Formation west of 24°E | Formation east of 24°E | Assemblage Zone |
|---|---|---|---|---|
| Jurassic | Drakensberg | Hiatus | Drakensberg | |
| Jurassic | Stormberg | Hiatus | Clarens | |
| Triassic | Stormberg | Hiatus | Elliot | |
| Triassic | Stormberg | Hiatus | Molteno | |
| Triassic | Beaufort | Hiatus | | |
| Triassic | Beaufort | Hiatus | Burgersdorp | Cynognathus |
| Triassic | Beaufort | Hiatus | Katberg | Lystrosaurus declivis |
| Triassic | Beaufort | Hiatus | Balfour | |
| Permian | Beaufort | Hiatus | Balfour | Daptocephalus |
| Permian | Beaufort | Teekloof | Balfour | |
| Permian | Beaufort | Teekloof | Balfour | Cistecephalus |
| Permian | Beaufort | Teekloof | Middleton | |
| Permian | Beaufort | Teekloof | Middleton | Endothiodon |
| Permian | Beaufort | Abrahams-Kraal | Abrahams-Kraal | |
| Permian | Beaufort | Abrahams-Kraal | Abrahams-Kraal | Tapinocephalus |
| Permian | Beaufort | Abrahams-Kraal | Abrahams-Kraal | Eodicynodon |
| Permian | Ecca | Waterford | Waterford | |
| Permian | Ecca | Tierberg / Fort Brown | Fort Brown | |
| Permian | Ecca | Laingsburg / Ripon | Ripon | |
| Permian | Ecca | Collingham | Collingham | |
| Permian | Ecca | Whitehill | Whitehill | |
| Permian | Ecca | Prince Albert | Prince Albert | |
| Carboniferous | Dwyka | Elandsvlei | Elandsvlei | |
References: Rubidge (2005), Selden & Nudds (2011), Smith et al. (2020).

The Karoo Supergroup is the most widespread stratigraphic unit in Africa south of the Kalahari Desert. The supergroup consists of a sequence of units, mostly of nonmarine origin, deposited between the Late Carboniferous and Early Jurassic, a period of about 120 million years.

In southern Africa, rocks of the Karoo Supergroup cover almost two thirds of the present land surface, making part of the 75% of sediments or sedimentary rocks covering the earth including all of Lesotho, almost the whole of Free State, and large parts of the Eastern Cape, Northern Cape, Mpumalanga and KwaZulu-Natal Provinces of South Africa. Karoo supergroup outcrops are also found in Namibia, Eswatini, Zambia, Zimbabwe and Malawi, as well as on other continents that were part of Gondwana. The basins in which it was deposited formed during the formation and breakup of Pangea. The type area of the Karoo Supergroup is the Great Karoo in South Africa, where the most extensive outcrops of the sequence are exposed. Its strata, which consist mostly of shales and sandstones, record an almost continuous sequence of marine glacial to terrestrial deposition from the Late Carboniferous to the Early Jurassic. These accumulated in a retroarc foreland basin called the "main Karoo" Basin. This basin was formed by the subduction and orogenesis along the southern border of what eventually became Southern Africa, in southern Gondwana. Its sediments attain a maximum cumulative thickness of 12 km, with the overlying basaltic lavas (the Drakensberg Group) at least 1.4 km thick.

Fossils include plants (both macro-fossils and pollen), rare insects and fish, common and diverse tetrapods (mostly therapsids, temnospondyl amphibians, and in the upper strata dinosaurs), and ichnofossils. Their biostratigraphy has been used as the international standard for global correlation of Permian to Jurassic nonmarine strata.

A timeline of the Earth's geological history, with an emphasis on events in Southern Africa. The green block labeled K indicates when the Karoo Supergroup was deposited, in relation to the Cape supergroup, C, immediately before it. The W indicates when the Witwatersrand supergroup was laid down, very much further in the past. The graph also indicates the period during which banded ironstone formations were formed on Earth, indicative of an oxygen-free atmosphere. The Earth's crust was wholly or partially molten during the Hadean Eon; the oldest rocks on Earth are therefore less than 4000 million years old. One of the first microcontinents to form was the Kaapvaal craton, which forms the foundation of the north-eastern part of the country. The assembly and break-up of Gondwana are, in terms of the Earth's and South Africa's geological history, relatively recent events.

== Geological origin ==
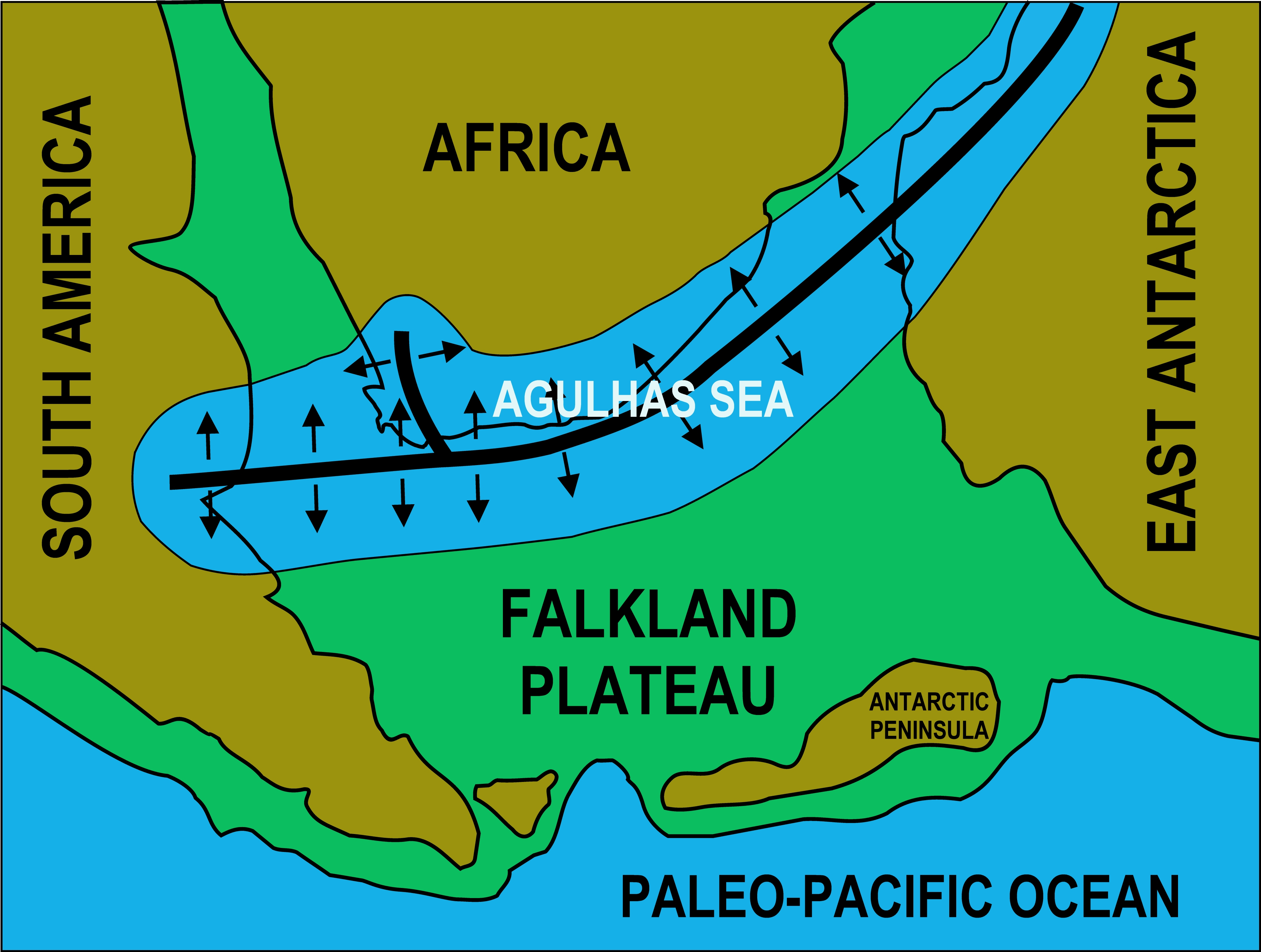
Southern Gondwana during the Cambrian-Ordovician Periods. Today's continents into which this Supercontinent eventually broke up, are indicated in brown. A rift developed about 510 million years ago, separating Southern Africa from the Falkland Plateau. Flooding of the rift formed the Agulhas Sea. The sediments which accumulated in this shallow sea consolidated to form the Cape Supergroup of rocks, which form the Cape Fold Belt today. This portion of Gondwana was probably located on the opposite side of the South Pole from Africa's present position, but compass bearings are nevertheless given as if Africa was in its present position.

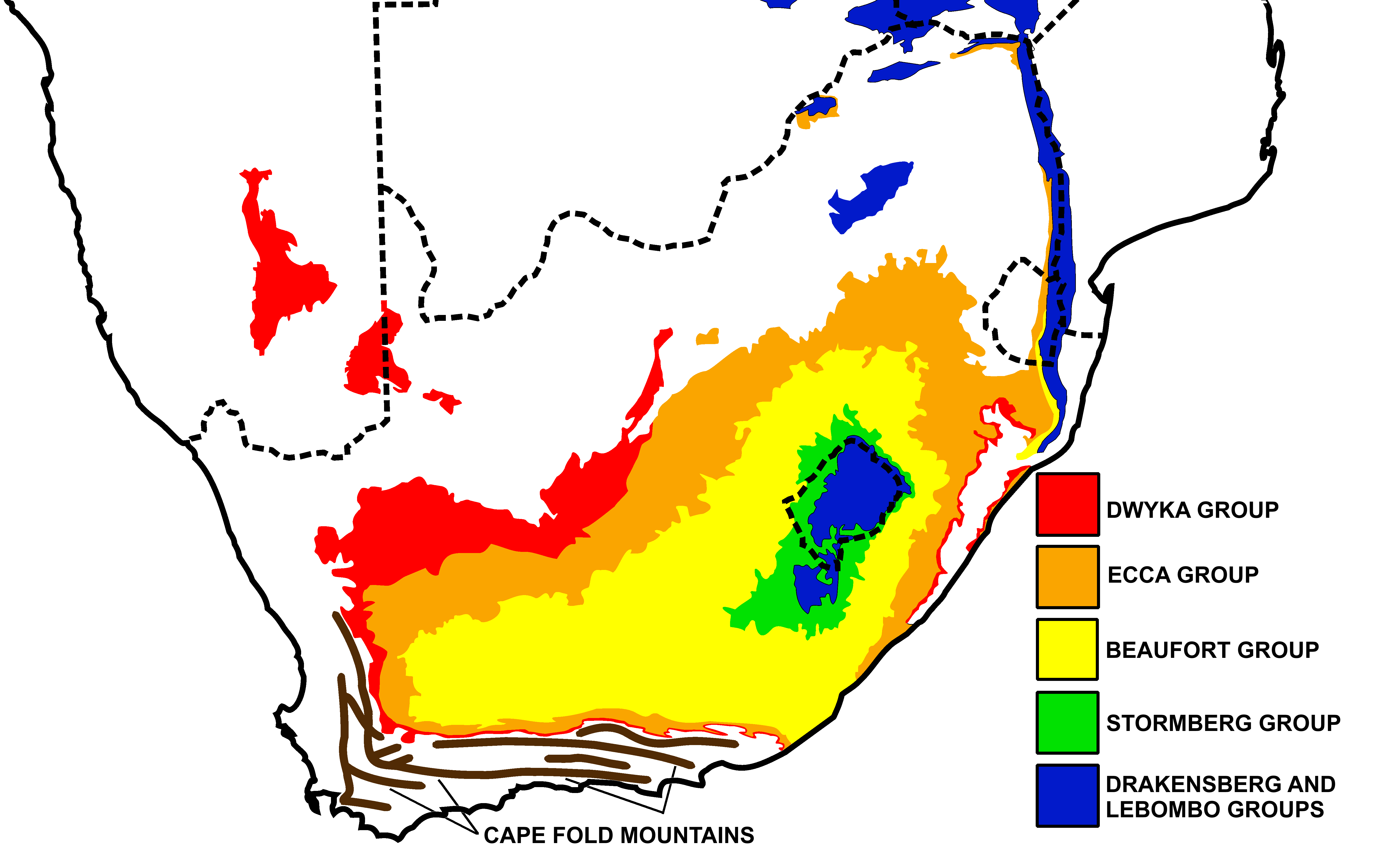
A schematic geological map of the outcrops of the Karoo Supergroup rocks in Southern Africa. The location and approximate structure of the Cape Fold Mountains are also diagrammatically indicated for reference purposes

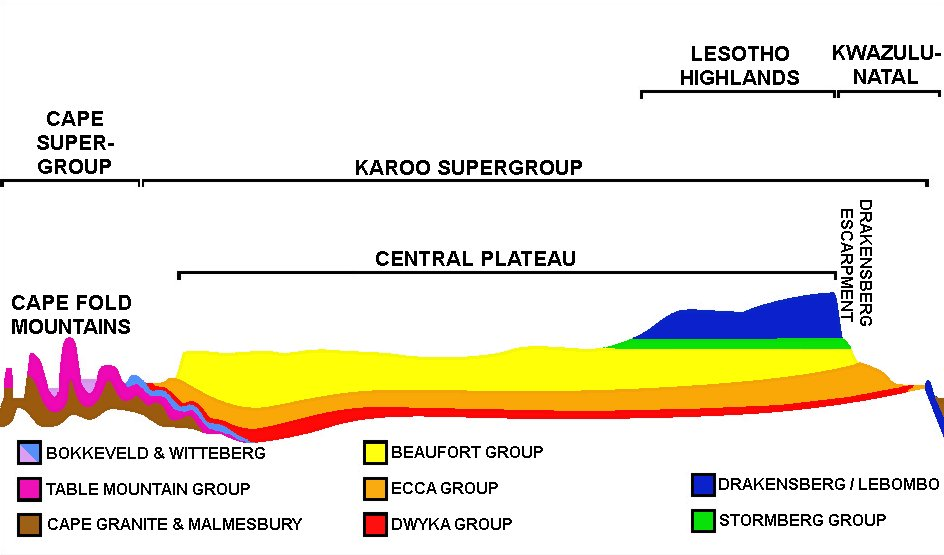
An approximate SW-NE geological cross section through South Africa, with the Cape Peninsula (with Table Mountain) on left, and north-eastern KwaZulu-Natal on the right. Diagrammatic and not to scale. The color code of the Karoo Supergroup is the same as in the illustration above.

=== Origins of sediment deposition ===
About 510 million years ago a rift valley developed across Southern Gondwana just south of Southern Africa, but extending westward into South America, and eastward into Eastern Antarctica and possibly even into Australia. An 8 km thick layer of sediment, known as the Cape Supergroup, accumulated on the floor of this rift valley. Closure of the rift valley, starting 330 million years ago, resulted from the development of a subduction zone along the southern margin of Gondwana, and the consequent drift of the Falkland Plateau back towards Africa, during the Carboniferous and Early Permian periods. After closure of the rift valley, and compression of the Cape Supergroup into a series of parallel folds, running mainly east–west, the continued subduction of the paleo-Pacific Plate beneath the Falkland Plateau and the resulting collision of the latter with Southern Africa, raised a mountain range of immense proportions to the south of the former rift valley. The folded Cape Supergroup formed the northern foothills of this mountain range.

The weight of the Falkland-Cape Supergroup mountains caused the continental crust of Southern Africa to sag, forming a retroarc foreland system, which became flooded to form the Karoo Sea. Sedimentation, beginning with glacial deposits from the north, but later from the Falkland Mountains to the south, into this depression formed the Karoo Supergroup.

=== The Dwyka group ===
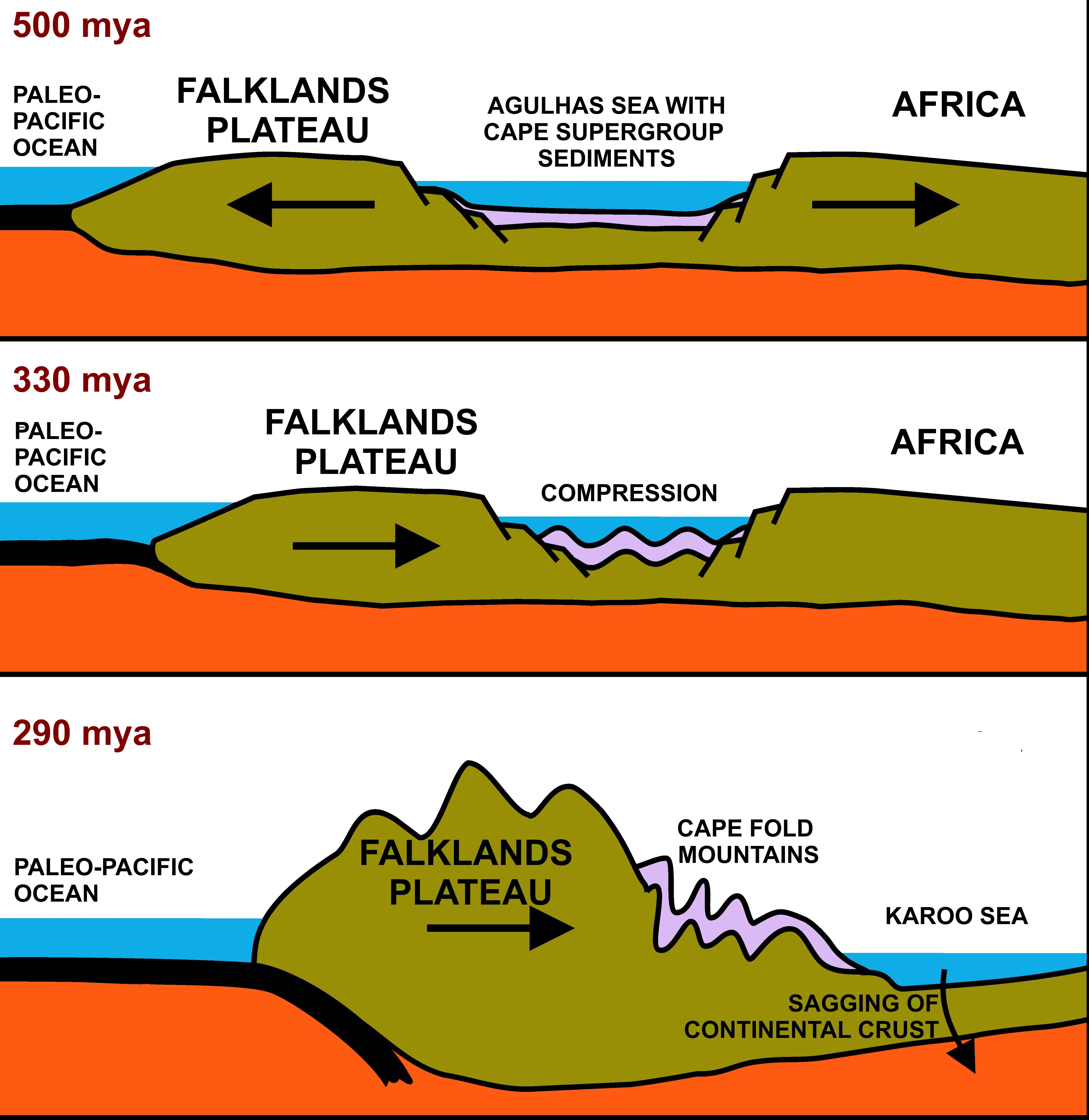
A north-south cross-section through the Agulhas Sea (see above). The brown structures are continental plates, the thick black layer on the left is paleo-Pacific Oceanic plate, red indicates the upper mantle, and blue indicates flooded areas or ocean. The top illustration depicts the geology about 510 million years ago, with the sediments which would eventually form the Cape Supergroup settling in the Agulhas Sea. The middle illustration depicts the Falkland Plateau drifting northwards once again to close the Agulhas Sea, causing the Cape Supergroup to be rucked into a series of folds, running predominantly east–west. The lowest illustration shows how subduction of the paleo-Pacific Oceanic plate under the Falkland Plateau, during the Early Permian period, raised a massive range of mountains. These eventually eroded into the Karoo Sea, forming, especially, the Beaufort Group of the Karoo Supergroup.

About 330 million years ago Gondwana had drifted over the South Pole, with the result that an ice sheet several kilometers thick covered much of Africa, and other parts of Gondwana. The glacial deposits from this ice sheet were the first of the sediments to be deposited to the north of the Cape Fold Mountains (and partially over these incipient mountains). The basin into which these sediments settled was deepest immediately north of the Cape Fold Mountain ranges. The ice sheet therefore floated on an inland lake, termed the Karoo inland sea, into which icebergs which had calved off the glaciers and ice sheet to the north deposited vast quantities of mud and rocks of various sizes and origins. Such deposits are known as tillite. Further north, the ice sheet was grounded also leaving diamictite deposits whenever it partially melted, but, in addition, it scoured the bedrock, leaving behind striations (scratch marks) which can be seen near Barkly West in the Northern Cape, and in the grounds of the University of KwaZulu-Natal. This layer of tillite, traces of which can be found over a wide area of Southern Africa, India, and South America provided crucial early evidence in support of the Theory of Continental Drift. In South Africa the layer is known as the Dwyka Group. It is the earliest and lowermost of the Karoo Supergroup of sedimentary deposits.

=== The Ecca group ===
As Gondwana drifted away from the South Pole, the glaciers melted, leaving a vast inland sea, extending across South Africa, and neighboring regions of Gondwana. It might have had an opening to the ocean (similar to the Black Sea) but tidal effects were small. Rivers draining mountains to the north of the Karoo Sea formed large swampy deltas in which plants belonging to the Glossopteris flora flourished. This dense vegetation accumulated as peat, which eventually turned into coal. The coal deposits are confined to the northern shores of the early Permian Karoo Sea, and is mined today in the Highveld and KwaZulu-Natal.

These sedimentary deposits are termed the Ecca Group of the Karoo Supergroup. They consist largely of shales and sandstones, and extend over the entire former Karoo Sea, but the southerly deposits do not contain coal, even though rivers from the Cape Fold Mountains formed small deltas. Although the vegetation in the south was not as dense as on the northern shores of the inland sea, several early reptiles such as Mesosaurus are found in these Ecca deposits. This is a fossil reptile found only in Southern Africa and Brazil providing important paleontological evidence of the existence of the Gondwana supercontinent.

The northern shores contain mainly fossil plants, pollens and spores. Fossils of a cephalopod and some echinoids are also found in the north.

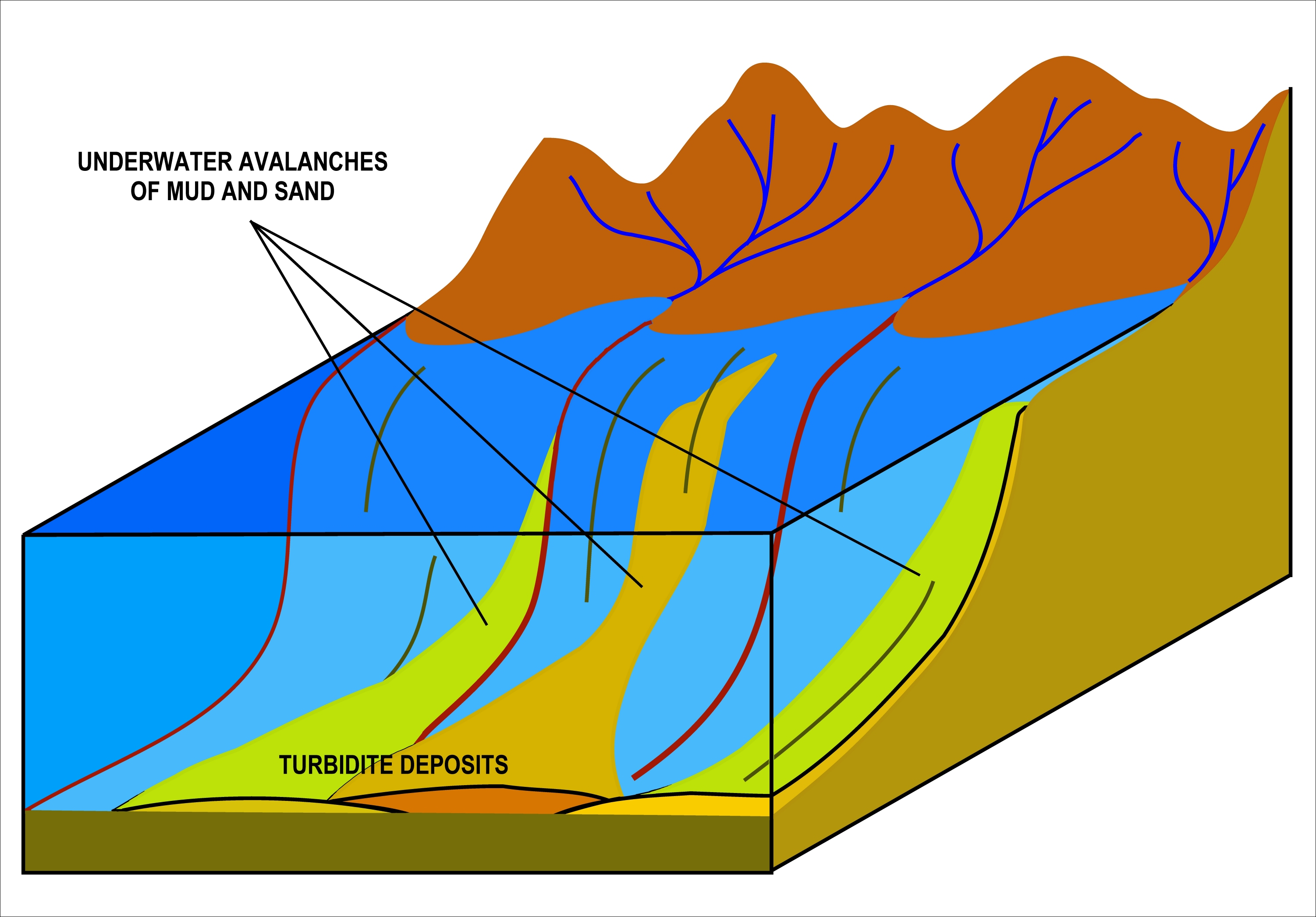
Turbidites are deposited in deep water at the bottom of the edges of continental shelves or similar structures in deep lakes, such as the south-western Karoo Sea about 300 million years ago. They are the result of underwater avalanches of mud and sand cascading down the steep slope of the edge of the shelf. When the avalanche settles in the deep water trough, the sand and other coarse material settles first, then the mud and eventually the finest particles. Organic matter that came down with the avalanche ends up in the turbidite in an anoxic (oxygen free) environment where it is converted to petroleum (oil and gas).

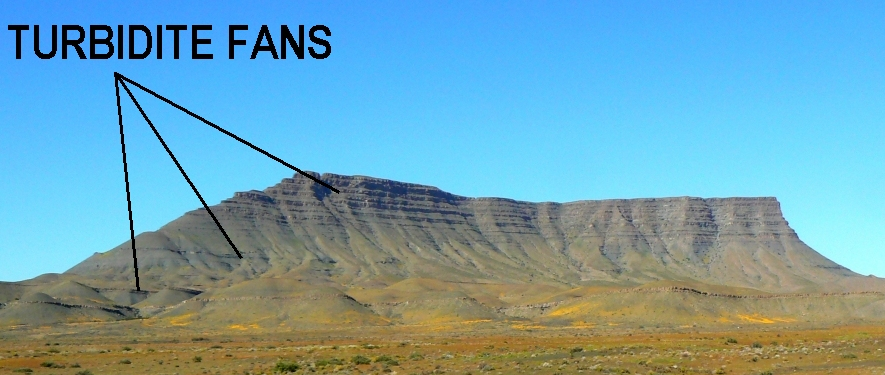
An Ecca mountain in the Tanqua Karoo, with multiple turbidite fans, indicating that the south-western portion of Karoo Sea was very deep, with steep slopes leading up to the shore line. The underwater avalanches were probably triggered by frequent earthquakes as the Cape Fold Mountains were being formed towards the south. The Ecca Turbidite deposits should not be confused with the dolerite sills found further inland (illustrated and described lower down, on the right, in the article) . The turbidites can be recognized at close quarters by the fact that the lowermost portion of each layer tends to be made up of sandstone which gradually grades into fine siltstone at the top of the layer.

During the Ecca period the Falklands Plateau collided and then fused with Southern Africa, forming a vast range of mountains to the south of the Cape Fold Belt. This new mountain range was comparable in size to the Himalayas. The northern slopes of these mountains generally dipped steeply into the Karoo Sea which was at its deepest at this point. The earthquakes that accompanied the formation of the Cape Mountains therefore initiated frequent underwater mud- and rock-slides, forming fan-shaped accumulations of turbidites, which can be seen in the south west corner of the Karoo today (see photograph lower down on the right) the Ecca group also has its members that are named based on the lithologies of the locality they are in . Turbidites have for some time been recognized as petroleum producing rocks, because the underwater avalanches that cause these deposits often carry organic matter from close to the coastline, especially near river estuaries and deltas, into the anoxic depths of adjoining troughs. Here it is buried in the turbidite and turns into hydrocarbons, particularly petroleum and gas. The turbidites in the Ecca formation of the Tanqua and Laingsburg Karoo regions have thus, recently, come under scrutiny by the petroleum industry and geologists, who have found them to have rich and readily accessible deposits of oil and gas. Thus the north-eastern Ecca basin is rich in coal, while its south-western corner is becoming renowned for its oils reserves.

=== Beaufort Group ===
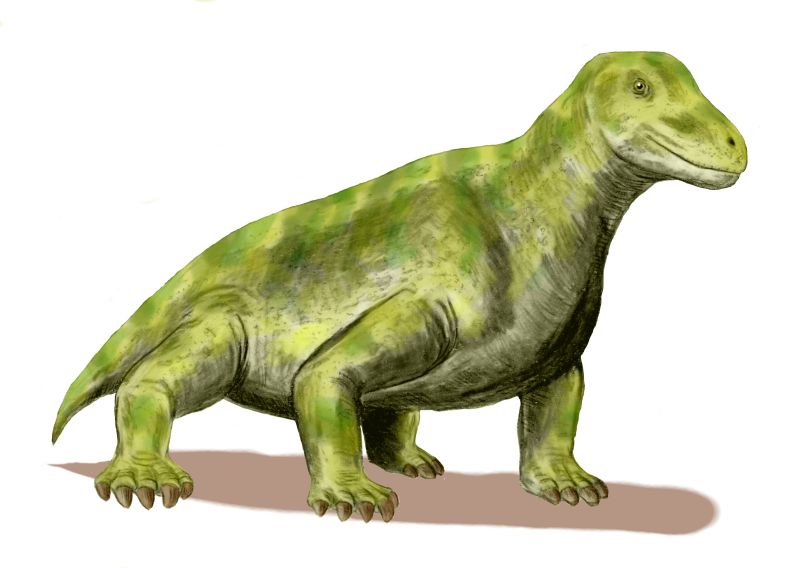
Moschops was a therapsid from the Middle Permian of South Africa.

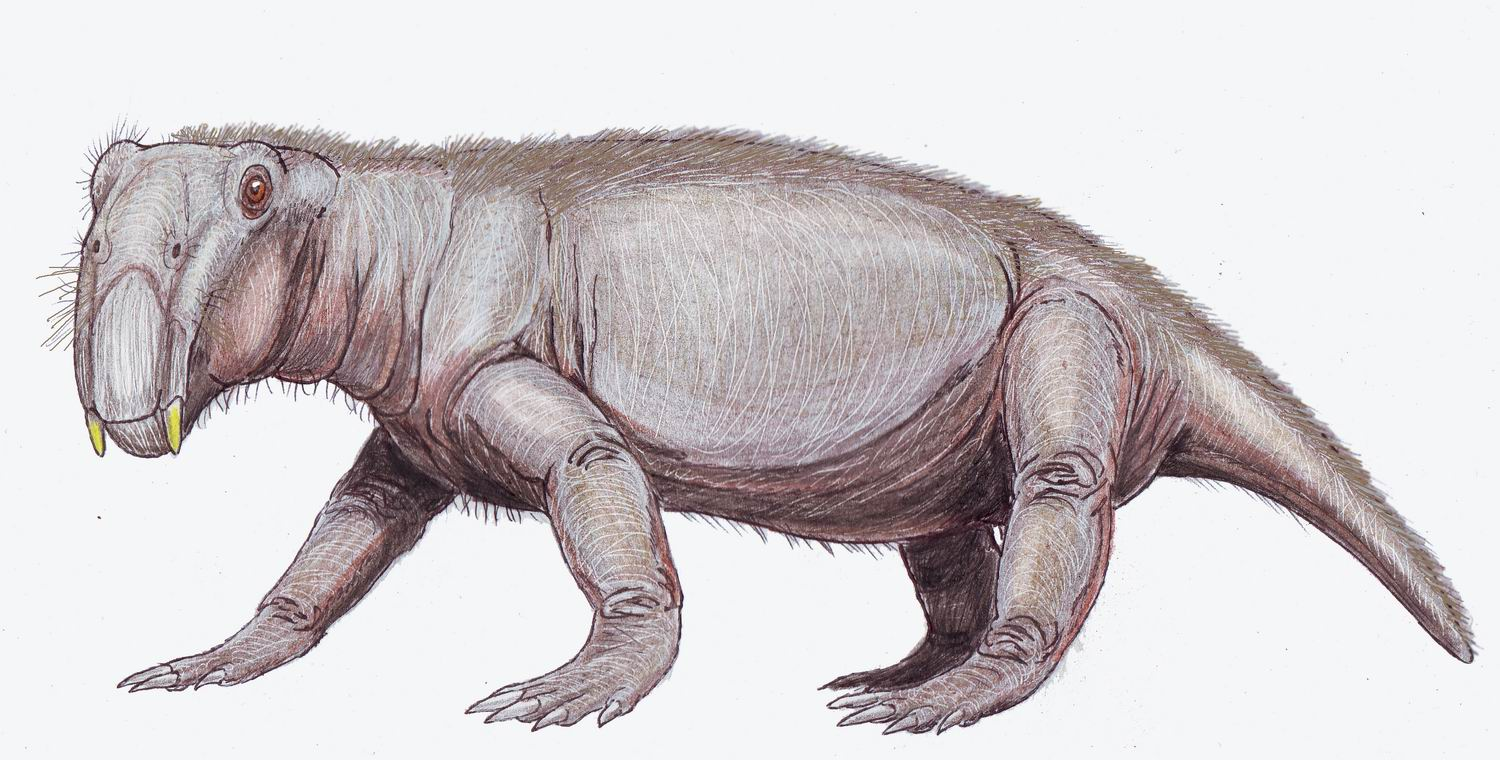
Lystrosaurus was the most common synapsid shortly after the Permian–Triassic extinction event.

With the formation of the Falkland Plateau and Cape Fold Mountain ranges, rivers from the south began to dominate the sedimentation in the Karoo Sea, which began to silt up. (The highlands to the north of the Karoo Sea had, by this time, been leveled by erosion and begun to be buried under newer sediments.) Several Mississippi-like rivers flowed over the silted up Karoo Basin from the south, creating rich new habitats for a variety of flora and fauna. The terrestrial (as opposed to lacunar or marine) deposits created by these rivers gave rise to the Beaufort Group. It is composed of a monotonous sequence of shales and mudstones, with some interbedded lenticular sandstones. The Beaufort Group is rich in reptilian, and to a lesser extent, amphibian remains. There is a plethora of both herbivorous and carnivorous reptile fossils. The Beaufort rocks are internationally famous for its rich record of therapsid synapsids (mammal-like reptiles), which mark an intermediary stage in the evolution of the mammals from reptiles. The most abundant herbivores were the anomodonts, whose most primitive forms are also known from the Beaufort rocks. The dinocephalians (terrible head) are so named because of their extraordinary thick boned skulls, which were probably used for head butting during territorial fights. With their 3-meter body length, they were the first large animals to live on land.

During the course of the laying down of the 6 km thick Beaufort deposits, the massive end-Permian mass extinction, 251 million years ago, extinguished about 96% of all species alive at that time. The global event can clearly be seen in the Beaufort rocks. A few members of the genus Lystrosaurus were the only mammal-like reptiles that survived this event. The Beaufort sediments that were laid down after this event tend to be coarser than the ones that preceded them, probably because of a massive die-off of vegetation, which had protected the surface against erosion. These early Triassic sandstone-dominated strata are known as the Katberg formation (within the Beaufort Group), which accumulated to a thickness of 1 km. With time the Beaufort deposits became more fine-grained once again, probably indicating a recovery of the vegetation in the Karoo, and with it the appearance of a wide range of new species, including the dinosaurs, and true mammals during the late Triassic – early Jurassic.

=== Stormberg group ===
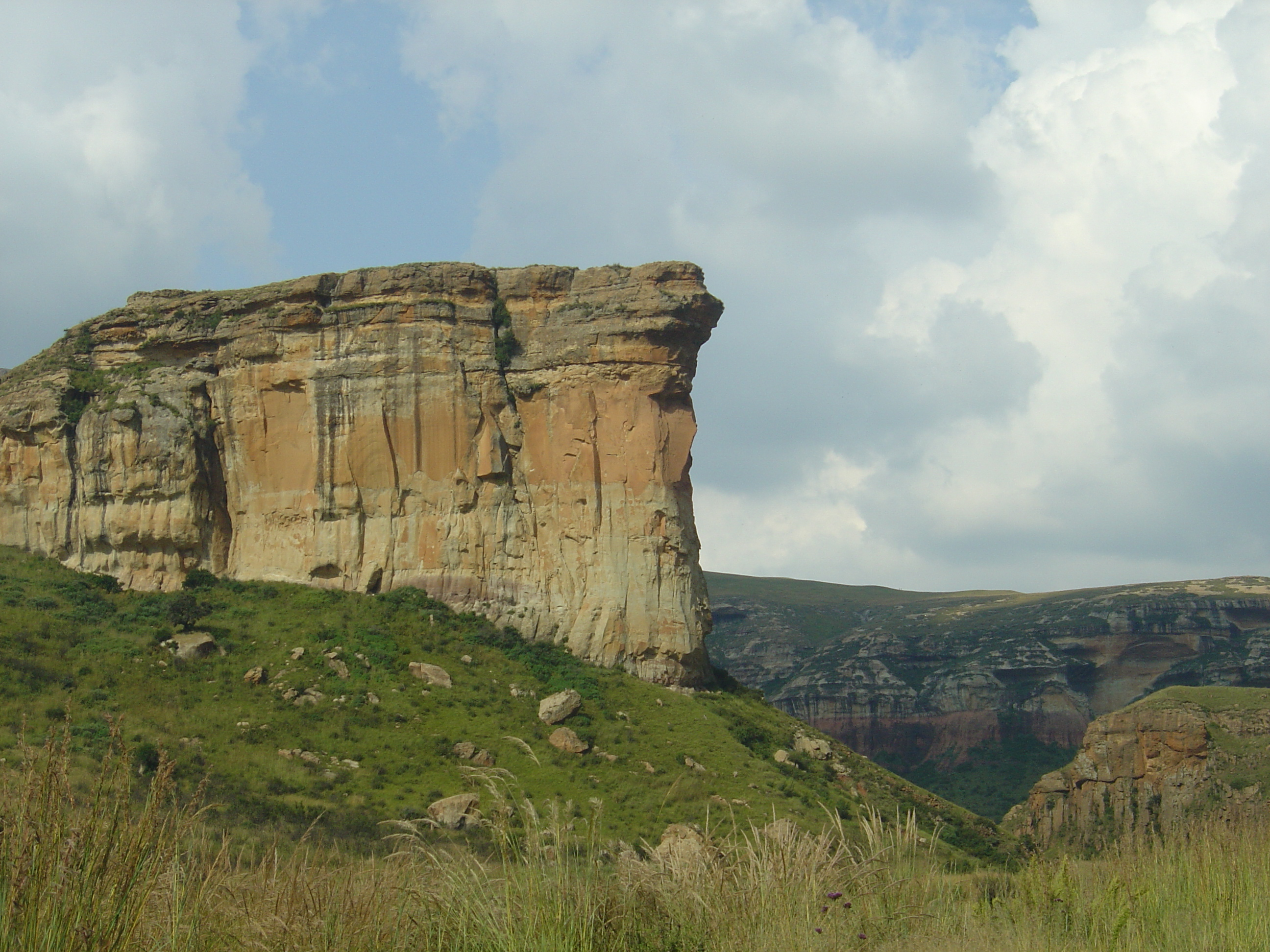
The Brandwag Rock (or Sentinel) in the Golden Gate Highlands National Park is composed of sandstone belonging to the Clarens Formation. The yellowish hue of the rock is typical of the Clarens rocks.

As Gondwana drifted north, conditions in the portion that was to become Southern Africa became increasingly hot and arid. Sandstones were the predominant rocks that formed. However, in some areas there was sufficient water to form swamps with consequent coal formation, but the quality is poor. The landscape probably resembled the Kalahari desert of today, with rivers like the present-day Orange River or the Nile running through it, sustaining localized areas of Triassic flora and fauna. The Stormberg Group contains South Africa's earliest dinosaur fossils. It also contains the fossil remains of the shrew-sized Megazostrodon, the oldest mammal in Africa. A remarkable array of insect and plant fossils are found in some of the strata.

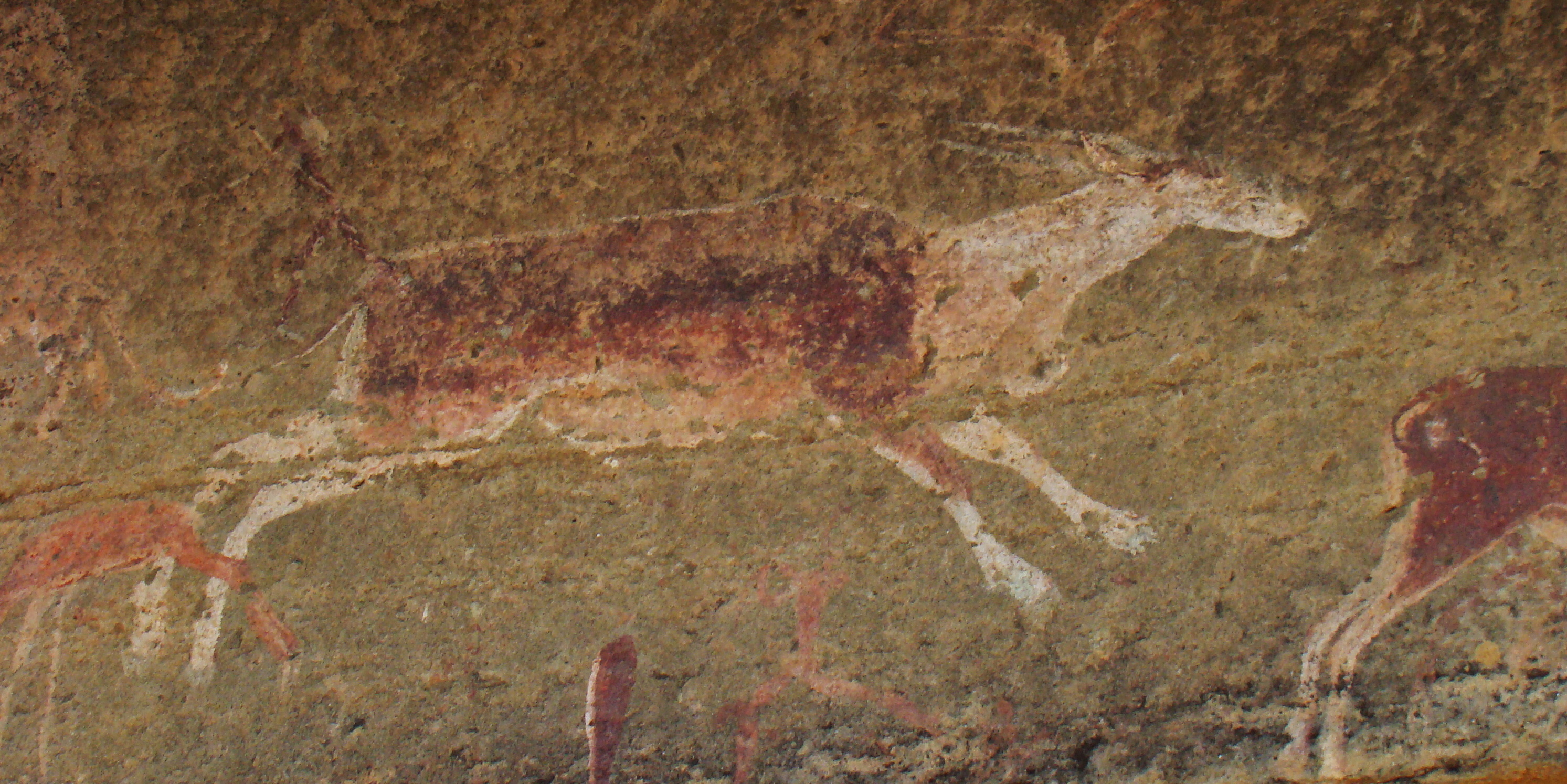
San rock painting of an eland in a Clarens Formation cave in the UKhahlamba Drakensberg Park of KwaZulu-Natal close to the Lesotho border.

The uppermost strata of the Stormberg group were probably laid down under true sand desert conditions, similar to the Namib Desert in Namibia. It was probably as large as the Sahara Desert today, extending from the Cape Fold Mountains many thousands of kilometers northwards over large parts of Gondwana. Only a small remnant of this massive formation can be found in and around Lesotho today. This formation was formerly known as “Cave Sandstone” as wind-eroded shallow caves often developed in cliffs made up of these rocks. These caves were later used by the San people who frequently decorated the walls with their paintings. Today the Cave Sandstones are called the Clarens Formation.

The oldest dinosaur embryos ever discovered were found in the Clarens Formation in 1978. The eggs were from the Triassic Period (220 to 195 million years ago) and had fossilised foetal skeletons of Massospondylus, a prosauropod dinosaur. More examples of these eggs have since been found in the Golden Gate Highlands National Park, situated on the Clarens Formation rocks. Other fossils found in the park include those of advanced cynodontia (canine toothed animals), small thecodontia (animals with teeth set firmly in the jaw), bird-like and crocodile-like dinosaurs.

=== Drakensberg and Lebombo groups ===
About 182 million years ago the southern African portion of Gondwana passed over the Bouvet hotspot causing the crust under the Karoo Supergroup to rupture, releasing huge volumes of basaltic lava over the Clarens desert, covering nearly the whole of Southern Africa and other portions of Gondwana. The pile of lava that accumulated over the course of several eruptions was more than 1600 m thick, especially in the east (in present-day Lesotho). This massive lava outpouring brought the Karoo sedimentation to an abrupt end.

The name Drakensberg Group is derived from the fact that this layer forms the uppermost 1400 m of the Great Escarpment on the international border between Lesotho and KwaZulu-Natal, often referred to as the Drakensberg (although technically the "Drakensberg" refers to the entire 1000 km long eastern portion of the Great Escarpment, only about a third of which is capped by the Drakensberg lavas).

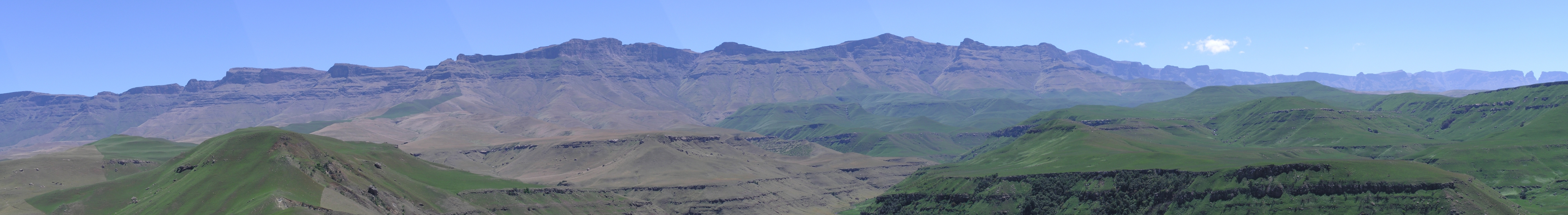
Panorama of the Drakensberg in Giant's Castle region, on the KwaZulu-Natal/Lesotho border. The uppermost layer of this portion of the Great Escarpment is formed by the 1400 m thick Drakensberg Lavas, which rest on the Clarens Formation rocks.

The magma welled up through long crack-like fissures, with occasional spatter cones, but typical volcanoes were rare. Each surface lava flow was between 10 and 20 meters thick. These flows piled up in rapid succession over 2 million years, to form a single continuous 1 to 1.6 km thick lava layer. However, not all of the magma reached the surface, but extruded under high pressure between the horizontal strata of the Ecca and Beaufort rocks. When this magma solidified it formed multiple dolerite sills at various depths throughout the southern and south-western Karoo sediments. These sills vary in thickness from a few centimeters to hundreds of meters.

This outpouring of lava coincided with uplifting of the Southern African portion of Gondwana, and the formation of rift valleys along what were to become the sea borders of the subcontinent. As these rift valleys widened they became flooded to form the proto-Indian and Southern Atlantic Oceans, as Gondwana fragmented into today's separate continents of South America, Africa, Antarctica, Australia, India, Madagascar and Arabia.

In close association with this rifting, a second episode of basalt eruption occurred along the border with Mozambique to form the Lebombo Mountains. A layer of lava more than 4800 m thick was violently extruded at this time. While the Drakensberg lavas form nearly horizontal layers, the Lebombo lavas dip to the east, so it is difficult to gauge how far the lava spread laterally.

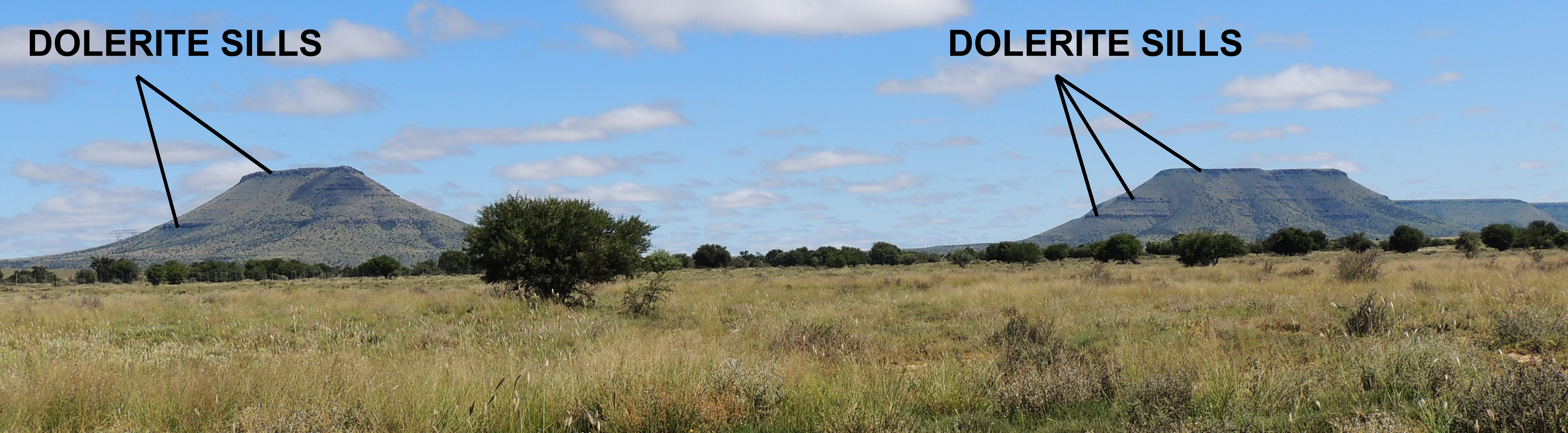
Typical flat topped Karoo Koppies in the Cradock region of the Great Karoo. The dolerite sills are harder and more erosion resistant than the Beaufort shales into which they were intruded, giving these hills their tabletop summits and stepped sides.

The uplifting of Southern Africa heralded a phase of massive erosion, removing a layer several kilometers thick from the African Surface. Nearly all of the Drakensberg lavas were eroded away, leaving a remnant in Lesotho, several small patches on the Springbok Flats in the north of the country, and in the Lebombo mountains along the Mozambique border. Once the layer of hard lava was eroded away, the softer Karoo sediments over the rest of the basin eroded even faster. However, the dolerite sills resisted erosion, protecting the softer Beaufort and Ecca shales beneath them. This created numerous and widespread flat topped hills, known as Karoo Koppies ("koppie" being the Afrikaans term for hill), which are iconic of the Karoo, and, by extension, the South African landscape. The dykes, or vertical fissures which brought the lava to the surface stand out today as linear ridges extending across large stretches of the Karoo.

=== Post Karoo period ===
The continued erosion of Southern Africa over the past 180 million years has meant that rocks younger than The Drakensberg Group are almost non-existent over most of the interior. Some of the eroded material from the interior was trapped between the Cape Fold Mountains to the south during the Cretaceous Period to form the Enon Formation and similar deposits near the coast of KwaZulu-Natal, north of Richards Bay. Apart from that, only very minor patches of very recent, mainly sandy deposits occur in South Africa.

=== The Karoo supergroup elsewhere in Africa ===
In Zambia, Zimbabwe and Mozambique the Karoo Supergroup is divided into (from oldest to youngest):

- Lower Karoo Group, comprising the Dwyka, Hwange (Zimbabwe) / Siankondobo (Zambia) and Madumabisa Mudstone formations.
- Upper Karoo Group, comprising the Escarpment Grit formation (in the Mid-Zambezi and Limpopo basins) and the Angwa Sandstone Formation (in the Mana Pools and Cabora Bassa Basins), overlain by the Pebbly Arkose Formation and the Forest Sandstone Formation, capped by Batoka basalts.

== See also ==
- Geology of South Africa
- Geography of South Africa
