= Kariba (district) =

District in Mashonaland West Province, Zimbabwe

Kariba is a district and constituency on the shores of Lake Kariba in the Mashonaland West Province of northern Zimbabwe, along the border with Zambia. The constituency comprises 12 rural wards or municipalities in Kariba Rural, also known as Nyaminyami Rural District, and 9 urban wards in Kariba Town, the district capital. The district's total population was just under 60,000 in 2011. Kariba town was built to house the workers who built Kariba Dam, which was completed in 1960 to supply Zimbabwe and Zambia with hydroelectric power, and which gave rise to one of the largest artificial lakes in the world. The creation of the Kariba Lake led to a thriving fishing industry, but following Zimbabwe's economic collapse, Kariba became the least developed district in the country. Kariba is also the most isolated district in Zimbabwe, with no tarred roads as of 2002. The main economic activities are subsistence agriculture, fishing and subsistence hunting. The district, which includes Matusadona National Park, suffers from high levels of wildlife poaching and high levels of human-wildlife conflict.
