= Zimbabwe Geological Survey =

Geological research organization

Agency overview
- Formed: 1910
- Jurisdiction: Government of Zimbabwe
- Headquarters: Harare, Zimbabwe
- Parent agency: Minister of mines and mining development

The Zimbabwe Geological Survey, founded in 1910, is Zimbabwe's premier geological research organization.

The survey is overseen by Zimbabwe's Ministry of Mines and Mining Development. The Geological Survey is charged with collecting and archiving information relating to the natural resources present within Zimbabwe. In the past, it has cooperated with the British Geological Survey on geological mapping and geochemical exploration initiatives, but due to economic issues and a loss of funding, it has been unable to continue mapping.
