= Bumi Hills =

Coordinates: 16°49′S 28°21′E

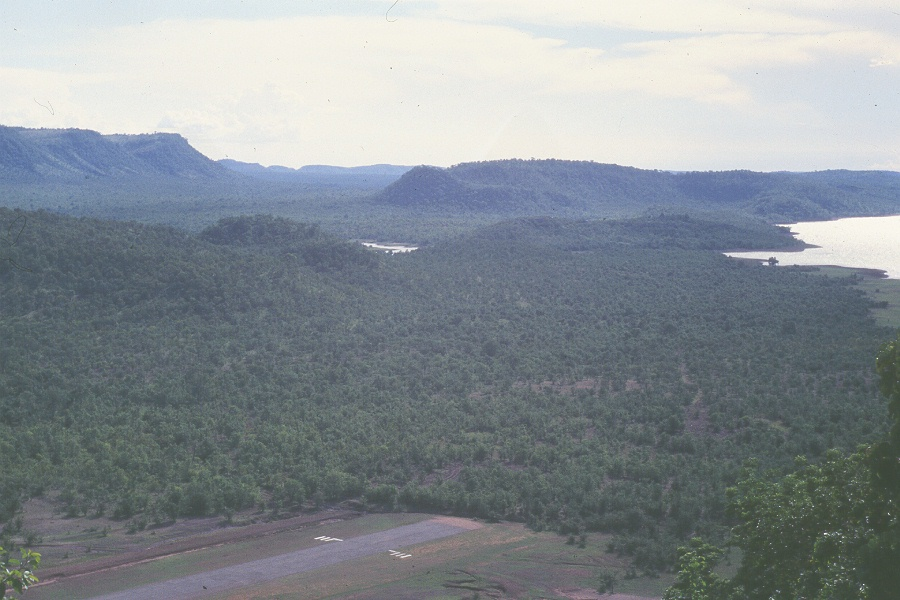
View from Bumi Hills Ridge, Zimbabwe

Bumi Hills is the name of a group of hills and a luxury safari lodge in Mashonaland West province Zimbabwe. Bumi Hills Safari Lodge is situated on the hilly ground overlooking the southern shore of Lake Kariba and was reopened in 2018.. The area is noted for its great variety of wildlife and magnificent views, especially the view out across Lake Kariba from the main Bumi Hills ridge.
