= Wadadam Fossil Park =

Coordinates: 18.7415°N 80.0735°E

Wadadam Fossil Park is located in a village known as Wadadam in Sironcha taluka in the district of Gadchiroli of Maharashtra State. It is about 19 km (12 mi) from Sironcha and about 189 km (117 mi) South of District Headquarters Gadchiroli. Here a group of paleontologists have unearthed fossils, it is believed that these are dinosaur fossils and are millions of years old. In India, Sironcha is one of the five places in the country where a large number of fossils have been discovered. A full skeleton of a dinosaur was unearthed in 1959 in Kothapalli-Pochampally village, this fossil has been kept in a museum in Kolkata.

Wadadam Fossil Park is half a square kilometer area which is India's first Dinosaurs site, where flora and fauna fossils are found intact. Fossils of flora were present at the time when the Sauropods existed in these parts of the Indian Subcontinent. This area was full of forests that had Glossopteris and Dadoxylon conifer trees with the co-existing giant Sauropods approximately in the middle of the Jurassic period.

Stone Age (Paleolithic) tools have been found at Wadadam Fossil Park. These stone tools were used approximately around 2.5 million years ago. This place is also known for fossils of fishes and dinosaurs like Barapasaurus, Kotasaurus, Yamanpalliensis and some others. There are a total of 24 fossil sites in Sironcha.

As the Wadadam area is set to become a fossil park the concerned authorities have put up big caricatures of the animals and plants which were found in that area. The authorities have also decided with the Archaeological Survey of India (ASI) state directorate of archaeology and also museums for collaboration and 3-D replicas. It is on NH 16 which connects Nizamabad in Telangana and Jagdalpur in Chhattisgarh. the nearest railway stations are Mancherial in Telangana and Ballarshah in Maharashtra.
