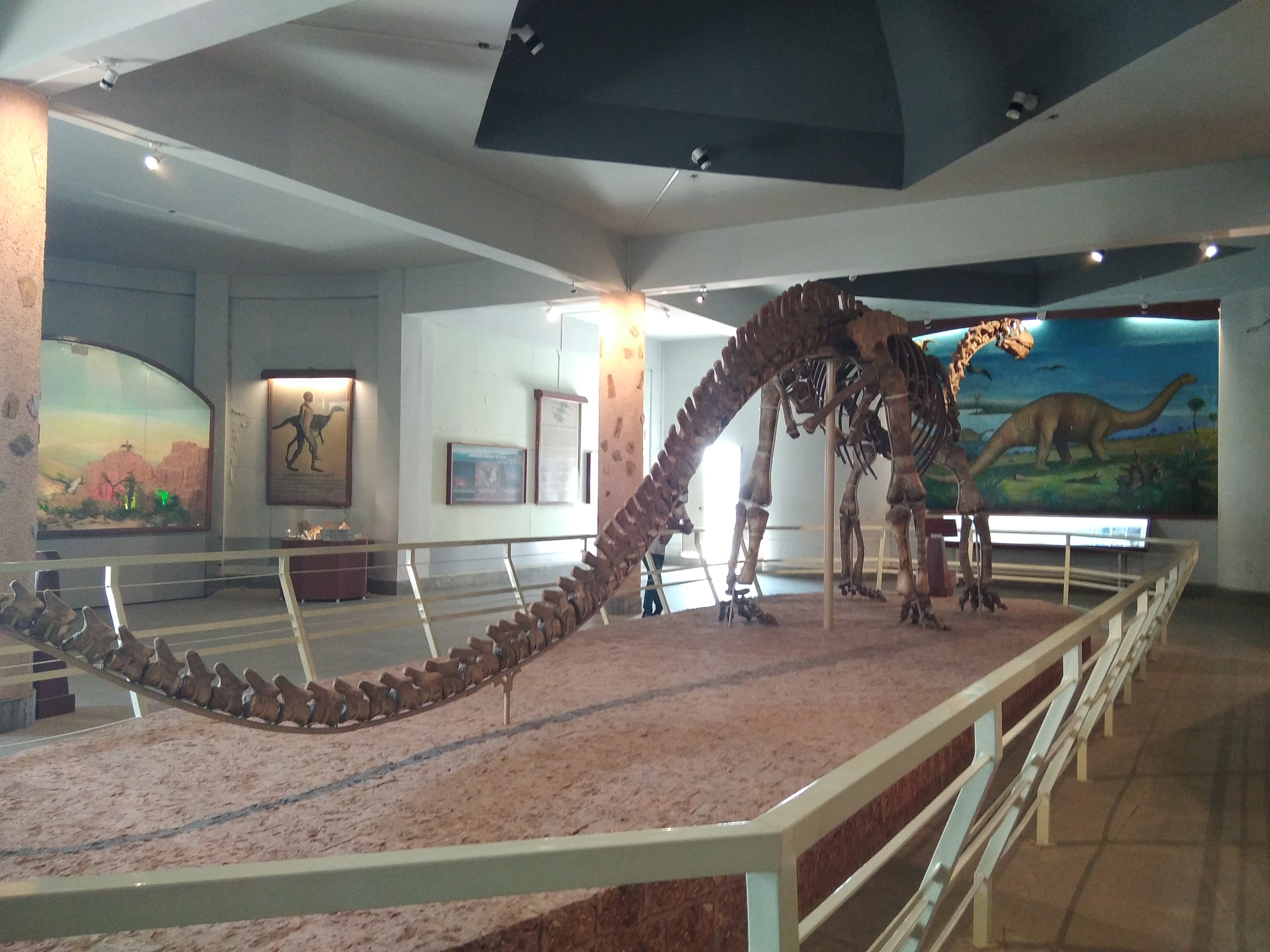
- Mounted skeleton of Kotasaurus; based on the holotype

Scientific classification
- Kingdom: Animalia
- Phylum: Chordata
- Class: Reptilia
- Clade: Dinosauria
- Clade: Saurischia
- Clade: †Sauropodomorpha
- Clade: †Sauropoda
- Genus: †Kotasaurus; Yadagiri, 1988

Type species
- †Kotasaurus yamanpalliensis Yadagiri, 1988

= Kotasaurus =

Kotasaurus Temporal range: Early Jurassic, Sinemurian to Pliensbachian

Extinct genus of dinosaurs

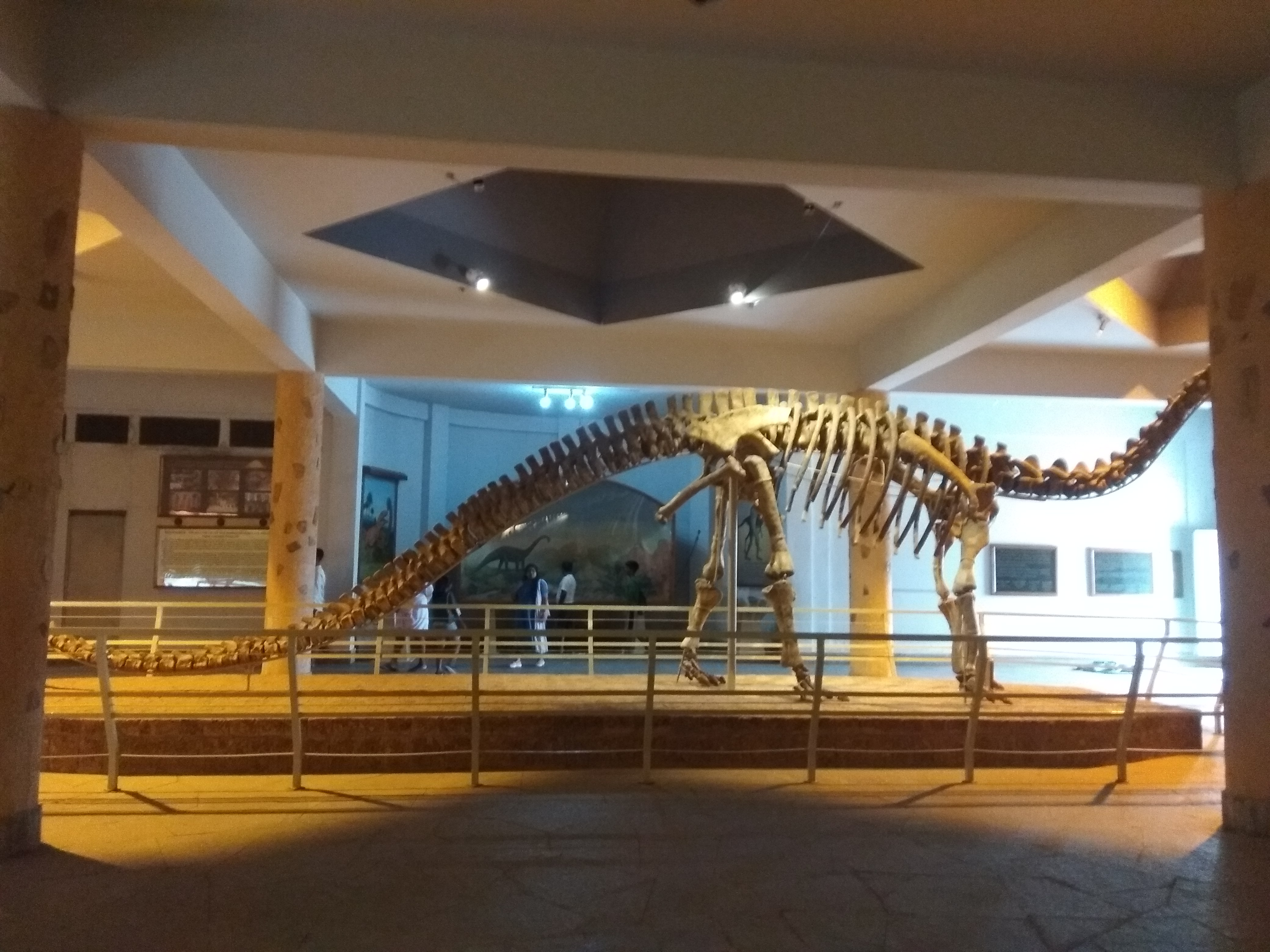
Skeletal mount of Kotasaurus yamanpalliensis, housed in the Birla Science Museum, Hyderabad.

Kotasaurus (/ˌkoʊtəˈsɔːrəs/ KOH-tə-SOR-əs; meaning "Kota Formation lizard") is a genus of sauropod dinosaur from the Early Jurassic period (Sinemurian–Pliensbachian). The only known species is Kotasaurus yamanpalliensis. It was discovered in the Kota Formation of Telangana, India and shared its habitat with the related Barapasaurus. So far the remains of at least 12 individuals are known. The greater part of the skeleton is known, but the skull is missing, with the exception of two teeth. Like some sauropods, it had a tail club that would have been used for intraspecific combat or interspecific defense.

== Discovery ==
All known fossils come from an area of 2,400 m^{2} near the village of Yamanpalli in Telangana, approximately forty kilometres north of the Barapasaurus type locality. These finds, altogether 840 skeletal parts, were found in the late 1970s. In 1988 they were named and described by P.M. Yadagiri as a new genus and species of sauropod, Kotasaurus yamanpalliensis. The generic name refers to the Kota Formation. The specific name reflects the provenance from Yamanpalli. The holotype is 21/SR/PAL, an ilium.

The Geological Survey of India combined several elements into a skeletal mount and displayed it at the Birla Science Museum, Hyderabad. In 2001, Yadagiri described the osteology in more detail.

== Description ==
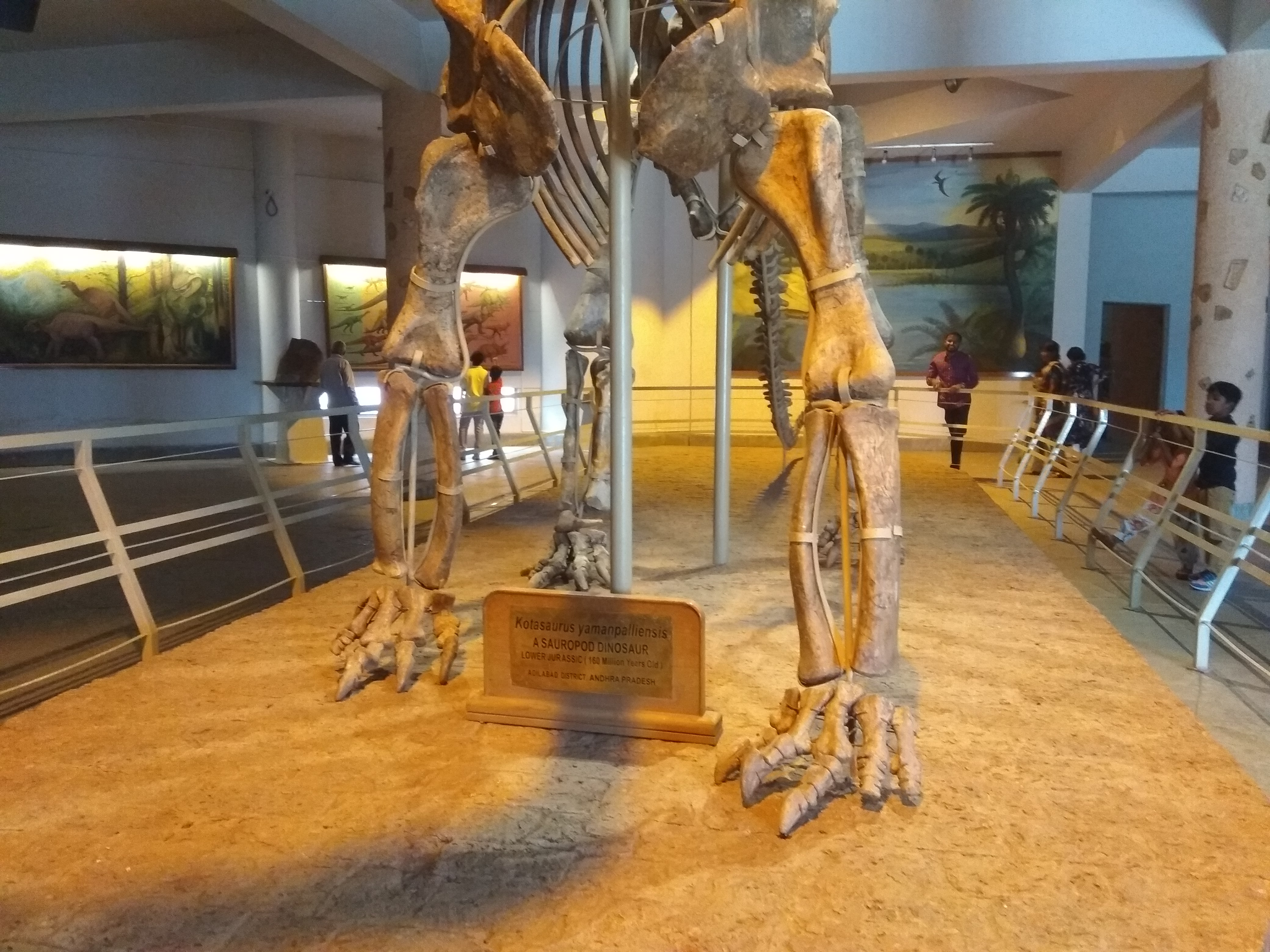
Legs of Kotasaurus

Kotasaurus is one of the most basal sauropods known. The general body plan was that of a typical sauropod, but in several basal (plesiomorphic) features it resembles prosauropods. Like all sauropods, Kotasaurus was an obligate quadruped, while prosauropods were primitively bipedal. The body length is estimated at nine meters, with a weight of 2.5 tonnes, and therefore already comparable with that of later sauropods. The femur was straight and oval in cross section, which means that the limbs were already columnar. The teeth were spoon-shaped, like those of later sauropods. Basal features, on the other hand, include the relatively short and slightly twisted humerus, as well as the retention of a lesser trochanter on the femur. The neural spines of the vertebrae were simply built and their centra are massive, in contrast to those of the related Barapasaurus, which show more hollowing, be it without pneumatisation, of the sides as a weight-saving measure.

Autapomorphies (newly acquired features) include the relatively slender limb bones as well as the low and elongated preacetabular process (the forward-pointing process of the ilium).

Based on comparisons with sauropods that possess tail clubs (Omeisaurus and Shunosaurus), a 2024 study reported the presence of four tail clubs from among the nearly 400 bones belonging to at least 12 individuals of Kotasaurus with varying ontogenetic stage.

== Classification ==
Initially, it was not clear if Kotasaurus represented a true sauropod or a basal sauropodomorph that has to be classified outside Sauropoda. Some paleontologists placed it inside a basal sauropod family called Vulcanodontidae though, together with Barapasaurus and the fragmentary Ohmdenosaurus and Zizhongosaurus. This grouping is now recognized to be paraphyletic.

Today Kotasaurus is recognized as one of the most basal sauropods known. The exact relationships are not entirely clear, however. A study by Bandyopadhyay et al. (2010) renders Kotasaurus to be more basal than Barapasaurus and Vulcanodon but more derived than Jingshanosaurus, Antetonitrus and Chinshakiangosaurus.
