= Sauropodichnus =

Trace fossil classification
- Domain: Eukaryota
- Kingdom: Animalia
- Phylum: Chordata
- Clade: Dinosauria
- Clade: Saurischia
- Clade: †Sauropodomorpha
- Clade: †Sauropoda
- Ichnogenus: †Sauropodichnus; Calvo, 1991

Dinosaur footprint

Sauropodichnus is an ichnogenus of dinosaur footprint. In 2020 Molina-Perez and Larramendi based on the 90 cm (2.95 ft) long footprint estimated the size of the animal at 26 meters (85 ft) and 40 tonnes (44 short tons).

== See also ==
- List of dinosaur ichnogenera
