= Yemanapalli =

Coordinates: 18°32′N 80°03′E

Yamanpalli is a village in Mutharam(Mahadevpur) mandal in Jayashankar district in the state of Telangana in India.
