= Zizhongosaurus =

Zizhongosaurus Temporal range: Middle-Late Toarcian, 178–176 Ma

Scientific classification
- Kingdom: Animalia
- Phylum: Chordata
- Class: Reptilia
- Clade: Dinosauria
- Clade: Saurischia
- Clade: †Sauropodomorpha
- Clade: †Sauropoda
- Family: †Vulcanodontidae
- Genus: †Zizhongosaurus; Dong in Dong et al., 1983
- Species: †Z. chuanchengensis

Binomial name
- †Zizhongosaurus chuanchengensis Dong in Dong et al., 1983

Extinct genus of dinosaurs

Zizhongosaurus (meaning "Zizhong lizard") is a genus of basal herbivorous sauropod dinosaur which lived in the Early Jurassic (Toarcian) Period of China. It was a large-bodied herbivore characterized by a long neck.

== Discovery and naming ==
The genus and its type species Zizhongosaurus chuanchengensis were named in 1983 by Dong Zhiming, in a volume written by himself, Zhou Shiwu, and Zhang Yihong. The generic name is derived from Zizhong County in Sichuan Province. The specific name refers to the town of Chuancheng.

The type specimens consist of three syntypes: V9067.1 is a partial dorsal vertebra; V9067.2 is a humerus or upper arm; and V9067.3 is a pubis. All specimens likely were part of a single skeleton, collected from the Ziliujing Formation. Zizhongosaurus was described as a small species.

In 1999 Li Kui mentioned a second species: Zizhongosaurus huangshibanensis but this has remained an undescribed nomen nudum.

== Classification ==
Zizhongosaurus was originally assigned to the Cetiosaurinae but later authors have placed it in either the Vulcanodontidae, as a relative of Barapasaurus, or the Shunosaurinae. It is today often considered a nomen dubium.
