= Ganjiramayyapetha =

Village in Maharashtra

GanjiRamayyapetha is a hamlet in the Sironcha Tehsil of Gadchiroli district of Maharashtra, India.

== Geography ==
Ganjiramayyapetha is located at 18°50′N 79°58′E18.83°N 79.96°E. It has an average elevation of 118 metres (390 feet).

== Education ==
There exists a primary school that caters to the educational needs of the residents of the village.

== Transport ==
Ganjiramayyapetha is connected by the State Road Transport services to Sironcha, Ankisa, Gadchiroli, Aheri, Chandrapur, Nagpur and Wardha via Sironcha. Ganjiramayyapetha is also connected to Telangana state capital Hyderabad and some popular city like Warngal, Karimnagar, Manchiriyal via Sironcha.
