= Sironcha =

- Town
- Location in Maharashtra, India
- Coordinates: 18.847244°N 79.968195°E
- Country: India
- State: Maharashtra
- District: Gadchiroli

Government
  - Type: Municipal Council
  - Body: Sironcha Municipal Council
- Elevation: 323 m (1,060 ft)

Population (2011)
  - Total: 7,427

Languages
  - Official: Marathi
  - Majority: Telugu
- Time zone: UTC+5:30 (IST)

Sironcha is a town and municipal council in Gadchiroli district of Maharashtra state in India. It connected with NH-63. Sironcha also spelled as Sirivancha is an important Telugu language center from ages. Sironcha was the center for Telugu learning and numerous Telugu language scholars used to reside here. Telugu is the primary language spoken here spoken by town and nearby villages.

== History ==
In 1892 the Rev. CB Ward a Methodist missionary on his way to Jagdalpur on horseback, stopped at Sironcha village, as his horse was limping due to a horseshoe. Meanwhile, the other two Missionaries surveyed the town of Sironcha for setting up the Missionary work in the year 1893 Rev. CB Ward and the Indian Missionaries started Missionary work at Sironcha village, later Sironcha was become a key location for the East India Company from Nizam perspective, it was the Southern tehsil of Chanda District, Central Provinces.

- In 1901, Sironcha tehsil area was 2,810 square kilometres (1,085 sq mi), and its population was 51,148. The transfer of the taluks of Nugur Taluka, Alubaka, and Cherla of the Sironcha tehsil, covering an area of 1,540 square kilometres (593 sq mi) and containing 142 villages with 20,218 persons, to the Madras Presidency had been sanctioned, but further details of administration were being considered.
- In 1905, an area of 6,740 square kilometres (2,603 sq mi) of the Chanda tahsil, of which 2,600 were in the Ahiri zamindari estate, was transferred to Sironcha.
- By 1908, the revised totals of area and population of the Sironcha tahsil were 8,020 square kilometres (3,095 sq mi) and 55,465 persons.
  - The population in 1891 of the area constituting the tahsil in 1908 was 51,732. The density was 6.9 inhabitants per square kilometre (18/sq mi), and the tahsil contained 421 inhabited villages.

In 1908, Sironcha's headquarters were at Sironcha, the namesake village of 2,813 inhabitants, 210 kilometres (130 mi) from Chanda town by road. The area of government forest in the new tahsil was 1,200 square kilometres (480 sq mi), while 5,840 square kilometres (2,254 sq mi) of the Ahiri zamindari were covered by tree forest, scrub jungle, or grass. The northern portion of the tehsil comprised in the Ahiri zamindari was one of the most densely wooded and sparsely populated areas in the province; to the south of this, Sironcha extended in a long narrow strip to the east of the Godavari, and consisted of a belt of rich alluvial soil along the banks of the river and its affluents, with forests and hills in the background. The population is wholly Telugu. The land revenue demand of the tahsil was approximately ₹17,000, before the revision of settlement in progress in 1908.

== Geography ==
Sironcha is located at 18.83°N 79.96°E. It has an average elevation of 118 metres (387 ft).

There is a planned National highway No 16 between Nizamabad in Telangana State and Jagdalpur in Chhattisgarh State, Maharashtra and Telangana states. The construction of this National highway includes building bridges over the Pranhita and Indravati rivers. Bridge construction on Pranhita River already completed which connects Mancherial district of Telangana to Sironcha tehsil of Gadchiroli District (Maharashtra). Also, Bridge construction on Godavari river completed which connects Kaleshwaram of Bhupalpally district to Sironcha Tehsil.The Tahasil is recently came into news for the discovery of Dinosaur's fossils and large numbers of wood fossils found dating back to crores of years, specially lower Jurassic period.

=== Climate ===
Climate data for Sironcha (1981–2010, extremes 1951–2010)
Month	Jan	Feb	Mar	Apr	May	Jun	Jul	Aug	Sep	Oct	Nov	Dec	Year
Record high °C (°F)	34.3 (93.7)	38.8 (101.8)	45.6 (114.1)	46.8 (116.2)	48.2 (118.8)	46.7 (116.1)	40.0 (104.0)	37.4 (99.3)	37.9 (100.2)	37.0 (98.6)	36.9 (98.4)	35.4 (95.7)	48.2 (118.8)
Mean daily maximum °C (°F)	29.8 (85.6)	33.3 (91.9)	37.6 (99.7)	41.2 (106.2)	42.5 (108.5)	37.4 (99.3)	32.6 (90.7)	30.2 (86.4)	32.0 (89.6)	32.7 (90.9)	30.7 (87.3)	29.3 (84.7)	34.1 (93.4)
Mean daily minimum °C (°F)	15.2 (59.4)	18.2 (64.8)	21.5 (70.7)	24.7 (76.5)	26.0 (78.8)	25.3 (77.5)	23.1 (73.6)	22.8 (73.0)	22.6 (72.7)	22.3 (72.1)	17.6 (63.7)	14.4 (57.9)	21.1 (70.0)
Record low °C (°F)	6.0 (42.8)	7.0 (44.6)	11.7 (53.1)	14.0 (57.2)	11.6 (52.9)	15.2 (59.4)	17.0 (62.6)	15.4 (59.7)	9.5 (49.1)	5.2 (41.4)	4.5 (40.1)	4.7 (40.5)	4.5 (40.1)
Average rainfall mm (inches)	7.3 (0.29)	10.1 (0.40)	11.8 (0.46)	4.5 (0.18)	28.7 (1.13)	184.5 (7.26)	389.9 (15.35)	382.1 (15.04)	143.0 (5.63)	79.6 (3.13)	10.0 (0.39)	2.6 (0.10)	1,253.9 (49.37)
Average rainy days	0.4	0.7	0.6	0.6	1.7	8.1	15.9	15.6	8.6	4.2	0.9	0.2	57.5
Average relative humidity (%) (at 17:30 IST)	43	38	33	28	28	53	72	78	73	65	59	52	52
Source: India Meteorological Department

== Demographics ==
=== Population ===
As of 2011 Indian Census, Sironcha had a total population of 7,427, of which 3,798 were males and 3,629 were females. Population within the age group of 0 to 6 years was 701. The total number of literates in Sironcha was 5,680, which constituted 76.5% of the population with male literacy of 82.4% and female literacy of 70.3%. The effective literacy rate of 7+ population of Sironcha was 84.4%, of which male literacy rate was 91.3% and female literacy rate was 77.3%. The Scheduled Castes and Scheduled Tribes population was 382 and 1,277 respectively. Sironcha had 1814 households in 2011.

Year	Male	Female	Total Population	Change	Religion (%)							
Year	Male	Female	Total Population	Change	Hindu	Muslim	Christian	Sikhs	Buddhist	Jain	Other religions and persuasions	Religion not stated
2011	3798	3629	7427	-	86.455	7.473	2.047	0.054	1.616	0.027	0.121	2.208

=== Language ===
Majority of the population of Sironcha speaks Telugu (84.9%), followed by Marathi speakers (10.7%).

== Transport ==
Sironcha town is connected by the State Road Transport ST services to Gadchiroli, Aheri, Chandrapur, Nagpur and Wardha. Sironcha is also connected to the Telangana State capital Hyderabad and some popular Cities/Towns like Bhupalpalle, Chinnur, Warangal, Manthani, Karimnagar, Godavarikhani, Hyderabad and Mancherial.

TSRTC Godavarikhani, Manthani, Bhupalpalle and Mancherial bus depots runs services to this town. Good transportation service from Telangana state.

== See also ==
- Ganjiramayyapetha
- Wadadam Fossil Park
