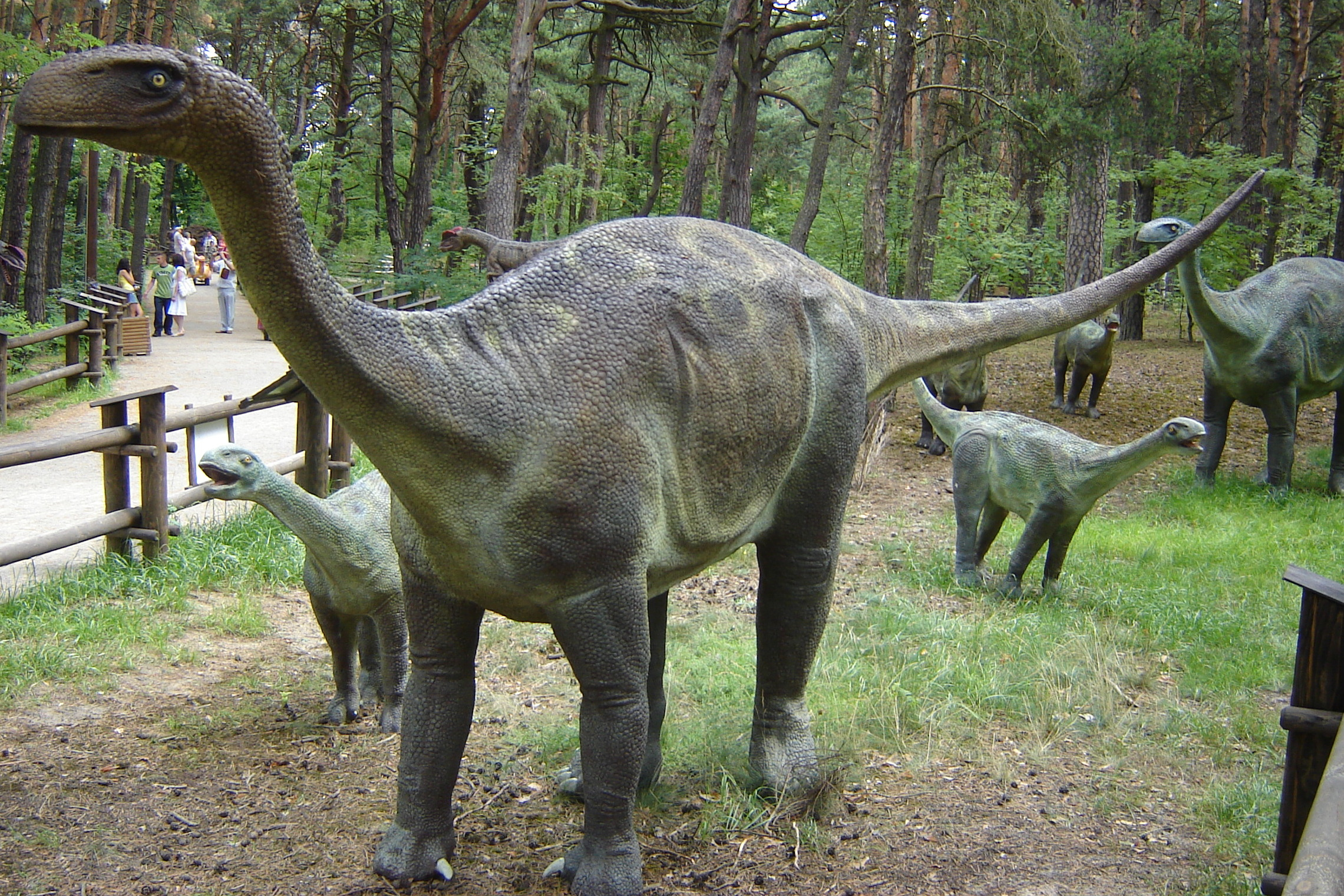
- Models of Vulcanodon in Poland

Scientific classification
- Kingdom: Animalia
- Phylum: Chordata
- Class: Reptilia
- Clade: Dinosauria
- Clade: Saurischia
- Clade: †Sauropodomorpha
- Clade: †Sauropoda
- Clade: †Gravisauria
- Family: †Vulcanodontidae; Cooper, 1984

Genera
- Tazoudasaurus; Vulcanodon; Zizhongosaurus?

Synonyms
- †Barapasauridae Hunt et al., 1995

= Vulcanodontidae =

Vulcanodontidae Temporal range: Early Jurassic, Sinemurian-Toarcian 199–175 Ma

Extinct family of dinosaurs

The Early Jurassic sauropod dinosaurs Zizhongosaurus, Barapasaurus, Tazoudasaurus, and Vulcanodon may form a natural group of basal sauropods called the Vulcanodontidae. Basal vulcanodonts include some of the earliest known examples of sauropods. The family-level name Vulcanodontidae was erected by M.R. Cooper in 1984. In 1995 Hunt et al. published the opinion that the family is synonymous with the Barapasauridae. One of the key morphological features specific to the family is an unusually narrow sacrum.
