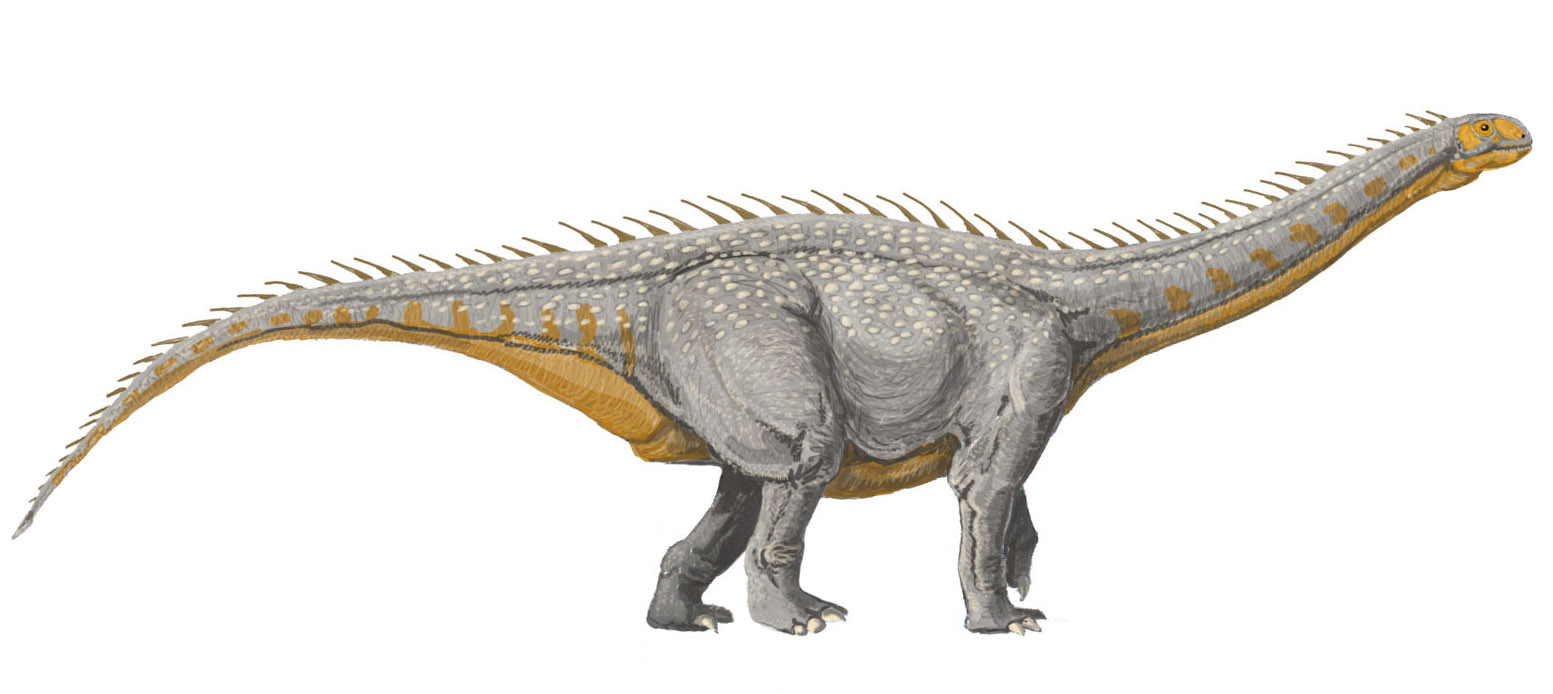
- Life restoration

Scientific classification
- Kingdom: Animalia
- Phylum: Chordata
- Class: Reptilia
- Clade: Dinosauria
- Clade: Saurischia
- Clade: †Sauropodomorpha
- Clade: †Sauropoda
- Clade: †Gravisauria
- Genus: †Barapasaurus; Jain et al., 1975
- Species: †B. tagorei

Binomial name
- †Barapasaurus tagorei Jain et al, 1975

= Barapasaurus =

Barapasaurus Temporal range: Sinemurian-Pliensbachian, 196–190 Ma

Sauropod dinosaur genus from Early Jurassic India

Barapasaurus (/bəˌrɑːpəˈsɔːrəs/ bə-RAH-pə-SOR-əs) is a genus of basal sauropod dinosaur from Jurassic rocks of India. The only species is B. tagorei. Barapasaurus comes from the lower part of the Kota Formation, which is of Early to Middle Jurassic in age. It is therefore one of the earliest known sauropods. Barapasaurus is known from approximately 300 bones from at least six individuals, so that the skeleton is almost completely known except for the anterior cervical vertebrae and the skull. This makes Barapasaurus one of the most completely known sauropods from the Early Jurassic.

== Discovery and naming ==
All known fossils come from a single locality in the vicinity of the village of Pochampally (Pin Code: 442504), bordering Telangana (Pochampally Sironcha Taluka, Gadchiroli District, Vidarbha, Maharashtra, in central India). The first bones were discovered in 1958, but most specimens were unearthed in 1960 and 1961. In 1975, the finds were described scientifically by palaeontologist Sohan Lal Jain and colleagues. In 2010, a more detailed osteological description was published by Bandyopadhyay and colleagues. The material is archived in the palaeontological collection of the Indian Statistical Institute (ISI), while a majority of the bones are part of a mount at the Geological Museum of the ISI.

=== Etymology ===
The name Barapasaurus ("big-legged lizard") is derived from bara meaning 'big' and pa meaning 'leg' in several Indian languages including Bengali; the Greek word sauros means 'lizard'. This name was used as a nomen nudum since a femur measuring over 1.7 m was unearthed at 1961. The specific name tagorei means 'Tagore's', which honours Bengali poet, writer, painter, and musician Rabindranath Tagore. The first year of fieldwork was carried out in the centenary year of Tagore's birth.

== Fossil record ==
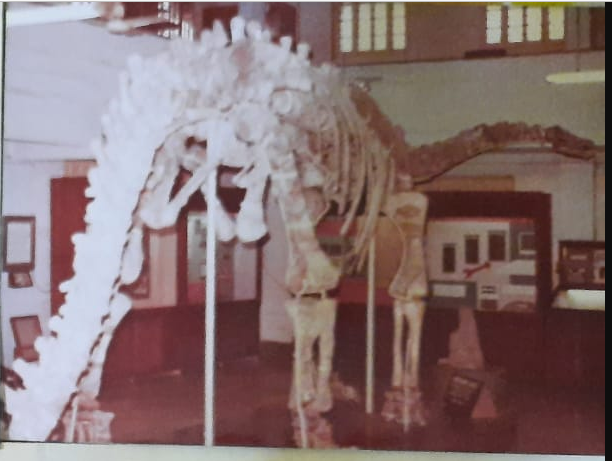
Reconstructed skeletal mount of Barapasaurus tagorei, based on Jain (1979)

Barapasaurus tagorei is known from a large bone bed found in the Lower Kota Formation, containing approximately 300 bones from at least six individuals of various ages. No remains of the skull, other than teeth, have been found. The age of this fossil site is disputed, because no volcanic rocks whose age can be determined by radiometric dating are associated with the Kota Formation and its age can only be estimated by biostratigraphic comparisons to other rock layers, which is made difficult by the lack of reliable index fossils in the formation. The age has generally been interpreted as Early Jurassic, with the Lower Kota Formation in particular dating to the Sinemurian to Pliensbachian, roughly 184–200 million years ago. However, some studies have argued that the Kota Formation dates to the Middle Jurassic or even later.

=== Taphonomy ===
The approximately 300 bones were found together with large trunks of trees scattered over an area of 276 square meters. Although one of the specimens was found partly articulated, most bones were found disarticulated. Because there are six left femora, the total number of individuals is at least six.

Bandyopadhyay and colleagues (2002, 2010) interpret this assemblage as a herd that died due to a catastrophic event, likely a flood. This flood could have unearthed the trees and transported both trees and Barapasaurus a distance before they began to decompose. After decomposition progressed, the bones began to disarticulate. The disarticulated skull bones were removed by the water stream because they were light, leaving only the heavy postcranial bones at the site, which would explain why no skull bones were found.

== Description ==
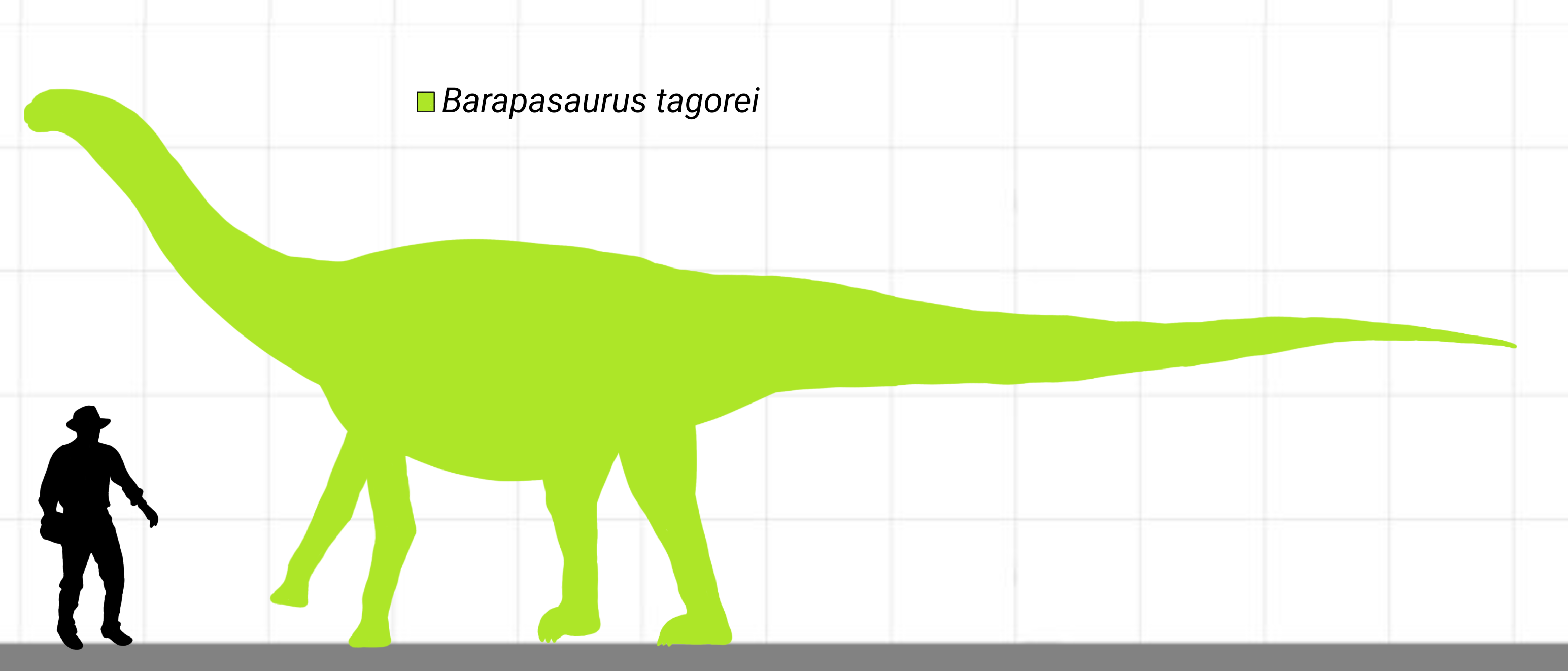
Size comparison of Barapasaurus tagorei

Although a very early and unspecialised sauropod, Barapasaurus shows the building plan typical for later, more derived sauropods: the cervical vertebrae were elongated, resulting in a long neck. The trunk was short and holds columnar limbs which indicate an obligate quadrupedal posture. Even the size, which is estimated at 12 to 14 metres (39 to 46 ft) long and 7 tonnes (7.7 short tons) in weight, is comparable with that of later sauropods.

The vertebral column already shows many traits that are typical for later sauropods which allowed them to attain great body sizes, although in later sauropods these traits are much more developed. The central and neural spines show early hints of hollowing as a weight-saving measure. The dorsal vertebrae are stabilised with hyposphene-hypantrum articulations, accessory projections that link the vertebrae with each other. The sacrum is strengthened through an additional fourth sacral vertebra.

From the skull, only three whole teeth and three crowns are known. The largest-known tooth is 5.8 centimetres (2.3 in) in height. Like that of later sauropods, the teeth are spoon shaped and show wrinkled enamel. A basal trait is the coarse serration.

== Classification ==
Cladogram of basal Sauropoda

- Sauropoda
  - Jingshanosaurus
  - - Antetonitrus
    - - Chinshakiangosaurus
      - - Kotasaurus
        - - Barapasaurus
          - - Vulcanodon
            - - Eusauropoda
                - Shunosaurus
                - - Camarasaurus
                  - Omeisaurus

Bandyopadhyay 2010

The relationships of this genus within the Sauropoda are debated. When first described in 1975, it was not attributed to one specific group at all, although the presence of many basal, prosauropod-like features was noted. Since 1984, Barapasaurus was united with another early sauropod, Vulcanodon, in a family called Vulcanodontidae, although this family was declared invalid by Paul Upchurch in 1995 because it was recognised as polyphyletic. Upchurch erected a clade named Eusauropoda that includes all known sauropods except some very basal forms. While Vulcanodon was classified outside the Eusauropoda, Barapasaurus was classified inside it, which means that Barapasaurus is more derived than Vulcanodon. Although Upchurch's classification was accepted by most palaeontologists, a recent study from Bandyopadhyay and colleagues came to a contrary conclusion: these palaeontologists stated that Barapasaurus was in fact more basal than Vulcanodon and removed it from Eusauropoda.

== Habitat ==
Barapasaurus comes from clay and sandstone that belongs to the lower part of the Kota Formation. Other vertebrates of this part include another early sauropod, Kotasaurus, as well as the mammals Kotatherium, Indotherium and Indozostrodon. The upper part of the Kota Formation additionally contained a pterosaur (Campylognathoides), a turtle, two rhynchocephalians, a lepidosaur and some mammals.
