= Mutharam (A) =

- Interactive map of Mutharam (A)
- Coordinates: 18.529°N 80.029°E
- Country: India
- State: Telangana
- District: Karimnagar
- Talukas: Mutharam (A)

Languages
  - Official: Telugu
- Time zone: UTC+5:30 (IST)
- Vehicle registration: TS
- Website: telangana.gov.in

Mutharam (A) is a village and mandal in Karimnagar district in the state of Telangana in India.
