= Kadzi Formation =

Geological formation

- Stratigraphic range: Tithonian; ~150–145 Ma
- Type: Geological formation

Lithology
- Primary: Conglomeratic sandstone, silty mudstone

Location
- Coordinates: 16.3°S 30.8°E
- Approximate paleocoordinates: 32.2°S 5.6°E
- Region: Mashonaland North
- Country: Zimbabwe

Type section
- Named for: Kadzi River
- Kadzi Formation (Zimbabwe)

The Kadzi Formation is a geological formation in Zimbabwe whose strata date back to the Tithonian stage of the Late Jurassic. The conglomeratic sandstones and silty mudstones of the formation were deposited in an alluvial environment. Dinosaur remains are among the fossils that have been recovered from the formation.

== Fossil content ==
Color key: Taxon / Reclassified taxon / Taxon falsely reported as present / Dubious taxon or junior synonym / Ichnotaxon / Ootaxon / Morphotaxon	Notes; Uncertain or tentative taxa are in small text; ~~crossed out~~ taxa are discredited.

=== Dinosaurs ===
==== Sauropods ====
Sauropods of the Kadzi Formation
Genus	Species	Location	Stratigraphic position	Material	Notes	Image
Brachiosauridae Indet.	Indeterminate	Mashonaland North, Zimbabwe	Tithonian		A brachiosaurid sauropod	
?Camarasaurus	?C. sp.	Mashonaland North, Zimbabwe	Tithonian		A camarasaurid sauropod	
Dicraeosaurus	D. sp.	Mashonaland North, Zimbabwe	Tithonian		A dicraeosaurid sauropod	
Giraffatitan	G. sp.	Mashonaland North, Zimbabwe	Tithonian		A brachiosaurid sauropod; originally referred to Brachiosaurus.	
Tornieria	T. sp.	Mashonaland North, Zimbabwe	Tithonian		A diplodocne diplodocid; originally referred to Barosaurus.	

== See also ==
- List of dinosaur-bearing rock formations
- List of fossiliferous stratigraphic units in Zimbabwe
  - Mpandi Formation
  - Forest Sandstone
  - Gokwe Formation
- Tendaguru Formation, contemporaneous Lagerstätte of Tanzania
