= Ultrasaurus =

Ultrasaurus Temporal range: Albian, Albian

Scientific classification
- Kingdom: Animalia
- Phylum: Chordata
- Class: Reptilia
- Clade: Dinosauria
- Clade: Saurischia
- Clade: †Sauropodomorpha
- Clade: †Sauropoda
- Genus: †Ultrasaurus; Kim, 1983
- Species: †U. tabriensis

Binomial name
- †Ultrasaurus tabriensis Kim, 1983

Synonyms
- Hltrasurus Kim, 1994 (sic)

Genus of dinosaur

Ultrasaurus (meaning "ultra lizard") is a dubious genus of sauropod dinosaur discovered and named by Haang Mook Kim in South Korea. It is significant for the first dinosaur bone discovered in South Korea. However, the name was first used unofficially (as a nomen nudum) in 1979 by Jim Jensen to describe a set of giant dinosaur bones he discovered in the United States. Because Kim published the name for his specimen before Jensen could do so officially, George Olshevsky renamed the specimen as Ultrasauros. Jensen's giant sauropod was later found to be a chimera, and the holotype is now assigned to Supersaurus.

== Mistaken assessments ==
A collection of bones discovered by Jim Jensen, of Brigham Young University, at the Dry Mesa Quarry, Colorado were originally believed to belong to the largest dinosaur ever. Jensen informally called this supposedly new dinosaur "Ultrasaurus", and this name was widely used by the press and in scientific literature as a nomen nudum (informal name lacking an actual scientific description).

In 1983, Haang Mook Kim published a paper describing a different specimen representing a new dinosaur species, which he named Ultrasaurus tabriensis, because he believed it was bigger than Supersaurus. However, Kim's assessment was incorrect; his dinosaur was much smaller than he believed, because he mistook a partial humerus for an ulna. Since Kim was the first to publish the name Ultrasaurus, the name officially applied to the South Korean sauropod, and could no longer be used as an official name for Jensen's giant specimen.

Jensen published a paper describing his original discovery in 1985, but since the name Ultrasaurus was already in use (or "preoccupied"), George Olshevsky renamed it to Ultrasauros in 1991 based on Jensen's suggestion. However, Jensen's discovery was a chimera, as the collection of fossils came from two different dinosaur genera Supersaurus and Brachiosaurus, both of which already had names. So the new name, Ultrasauros, is now considered as a junior synonym for the dinosaur officially known as Supersaurus.

== Description ==
Ultrasaurus lived 100 to 110 million years ago, during the Albian stage of the Early Cretaceous. It is known from the holotype DGBU-1973, which consists of part of the dinosaur's front leg or “hand” (humerus) initially mistaken as the upper (proximal) end of the right medial forearm (ulna), and DGBU-1978-A, a single tailbone (vertebrae) from the Gugyedong Member of the Hupyeongdong Formation, belonging to the Hayang Group.

== Classification ==
Based on lack of diagnostic features shown in the fossil, Lee et al. (1997) proposed Ultrasaurus as a nomen dubium. Not enough is known about the specimen to formally assign it to a specific family of sauropods.
