= Mesadactylus =

Mesadactylus Temporal range: Late Jurassic, Kimmeridgian–Tithonian

Scientific classification
- Kingdom: Animalia
- Phylum: Chordata
- Class: Reptilia
- Order: †Pterosauria
- Family: †Anurognathidae
- Genus: †Mesadactylus; Jensen & Padian, 1989
- Species: †M. ornithosphyos

Binomial name
- †Mesadactylus ornithosphyos Jensen & Padian, 1989

Genus of anurognathid pterosaur from the Late Jurassic

Mesadactylus ('mesa finger') is an extinct genus of pterosaur from the Kimmeridgian-Tithonian-age Upper Jurassic Morrison Formation of Colorado, United States. The genus was named in 1989 by James Jensen and Kevin Padian. The type species is Mesadactylus ornithosphyos.

== Classification ==
The holotype is BYU 2024, a synsacrum of seven sacral vertebrae, featuring a unique—for a pterosaur—complete fusion of the spinae into a supraneural blade, a character, as the specific name indicates more typical for birds, at first leading Jensen to assign the fossil to a bird, Palaeopteryx.

Further referred associated remains include arms bones, pectoral girdle bones, vertebrae (including cervix and sacral), and femora. Additional material was described in 2004 (including a partial braincase) and 2006; in the latter publication, the authors suggested that its larger contemporary Kepodactylus could be the same animal, although there are minor differences.

Jensen and Padian classified Mesadactylus as a pterodactyloid. In 2007 S. Christopher Bennett claimed that the holotype and the referred material came from different forms and that, while the last was indeed of a pterodactyloid nature, the synsacrum belonged to a member of the Anurognathidae.

== See also ==
- List of pterosaur genera
- Timeline of pterosaur research
