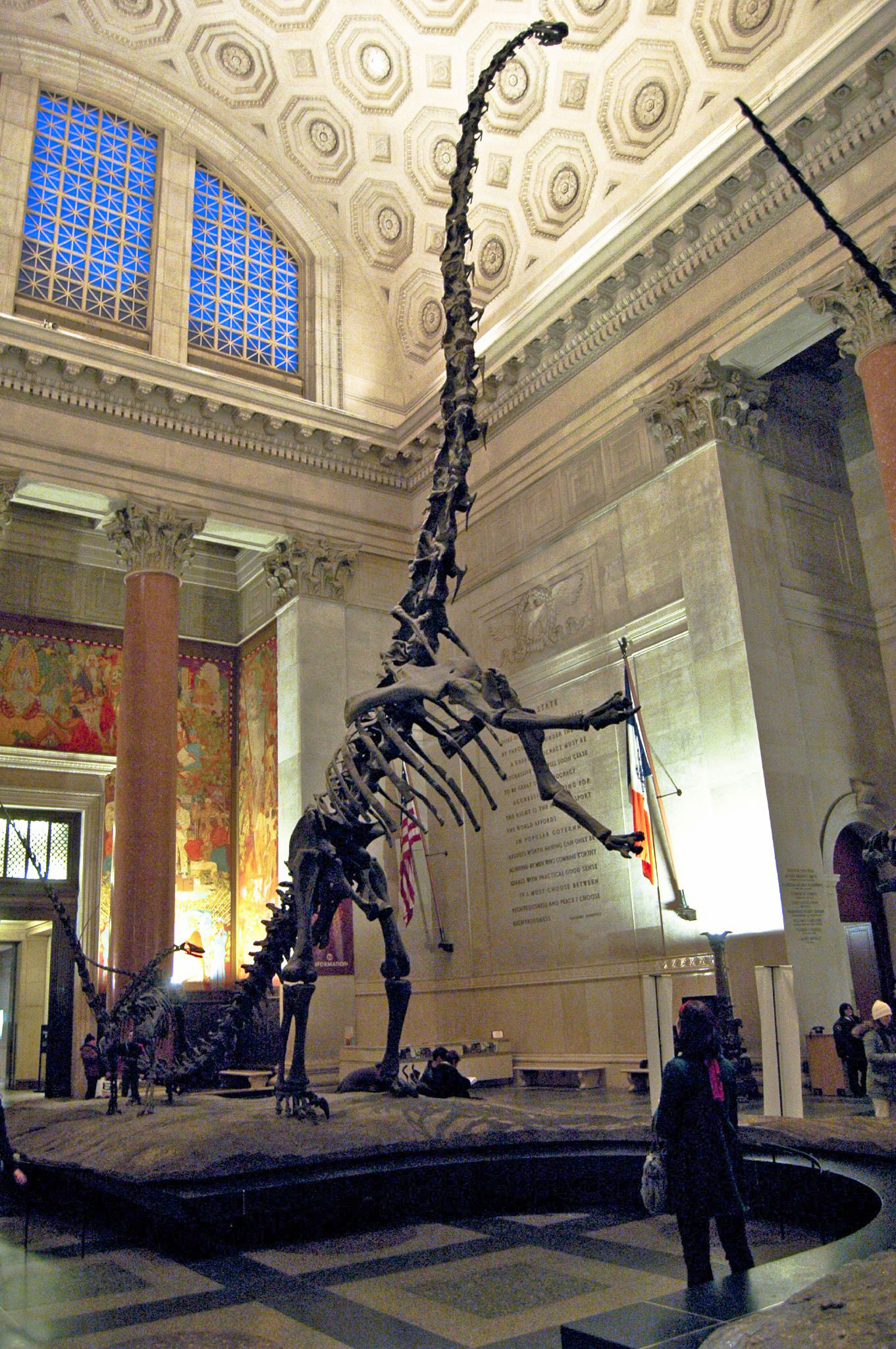
- Mounted skeleton in rearing posture with a juvenile Kaatedocus siberi, American Museum of Natural History

Scientific classification
- Kingdom: Animalia
- Phylum: Chordata
- Class: Reptilia
- Clade: Dinosauria
- Clade: Saurischia
- Clade: †Sauropodomorpha
- Clade: †Sauropoda
- Clade: †Eusauropoda
- Superfamily: †Diplodocoidea
- Family: †Diplodocidae
- Genus: †Barosaurus; Marsh, 1890
- Species: †B. lentus

Binomial name
- †Barosaurus lentus Marsh, 1890

Synonyms
- Barosaurus affinis Marsh, 1899

= Barosaurus =

Barosaurus Temporal range: Late Jurassic (Kimmeridgian), 152–150 Ma

Diplodocid sauropod dinosaur genus from Upper Jurassic Period

Barosaurus (/ˌbæroʊˈsɔːrəs/ BARR-oh-SOR-əs) ("heavy lizard") is a genus of large sauropod dinosaur that lived in present-day North America during the Late Jurassic period. It was described by American paleontologist Othniel Charles Marsh in 1890. The genus contains a single valid species, B. lentus, though the African species B. africanus has since been assigned to Tornieria. B. lentus' holotype (name-bearing) specimen initially consisted of four caudal (tail) vertebrae that were found in 1889 in South Dakota by Ms. Isabella R. Ellerman. However, later excavations found vertebrae, limb bones, and other postcranial remains from the same individual. Several other specimens have been collected outcrops of the Morrison Formation in Utah and Montana, though fossils potentially from the genus have been reported from Colorado, Wyoming, and Oklahoma as well. Barosaurus is known from the Kimmeridgian stage of the Late Jurassic period, which dates to around 152 to 150 million years ago.

Barosaurus was an enormous animal, with some adults measuring about 25–27 m (82–89 ft) in length and weighing about 12–20 metric tons (13–22 short tons). This makes it among the largest diplodocid sauropods. In comparison to its close kin Diplodocus, Barosaurus has a relatively longer neck but shorter tail. Despite this, the tail composed around half the total length of the animal. Barosaurus has 16 cervical vertebrae, more than Diplodocus and Apatosaurus, which are extremely elongated. The back was more compact, with only nine dorsal vertebrae. Barosaurus is a member of the family Diplodocidae, a group of long-tailed sauropods that lived during the Jurassic. The Morrison Formation had a floodplain environment with hot summers and moderate winters. The strata of the Morrison Formation bears a variety of other fossils, including an array of dinosaurs. This includes the theropods Allosaurus and Ceratosaurus, ornithischians Stegosaurus and Dryosaurus, and the other sauropods Brachiosaurus and Brontosaurus.

== Discovery, naming, and history ==
=== Initial discoveries ===
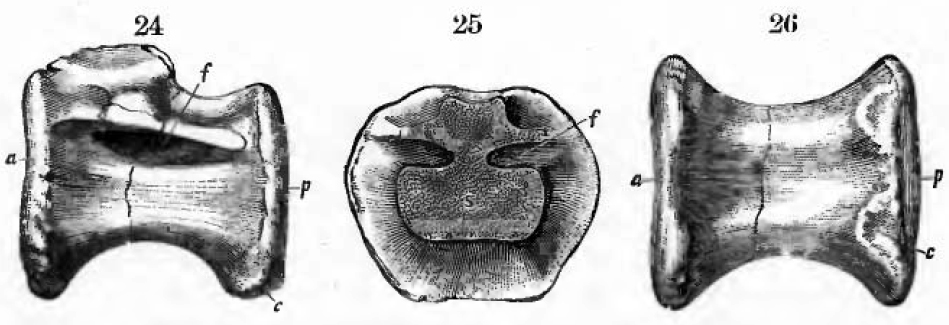
One of the holotype caudal vertebrae in multiple perspectives

The first Barosaurus remains were discovered in the Morrison Formation of South Dakota by Ms. Isabella R. Ellerman, postmistress of Postville, and excavated by Othniel Charles Marsh and John Bell Hatcher of Yale University in 1889. Only six tail vertebrae were recovered at that time, forming the type specimen (YPM 429) of a new species, which Marsh named Barosaurus lentus. Although Marsh did not provide an etymology, he probably intended the name Barosaurus to mean "heavy lizard". In this case, the name would be derived from the Classical Greek words βαρυς (barys) ("heavy") and σαυρος (sauros) ("lizard"), and the spelling Barysaurus (with an "y") would have been more accurate.

The rest of the type specimen was left in the ground under the protection of the landowner, Ms Rachel Hatch, until it was collected nine years later, in 1898, by Marsh's assistant, George Reber Wieland. These new remains consisted of vertebrae, ribs, and limb bones. In 1896 Marsh had placed Barosaurus in the Atlantosauridae; in 1898 it was classified by him as a diplodocid for the first time. In his last published paper before his death, Marsh named two smaller metatarsals found by Wieland as a second species, Barosaurus affinis, but this has long been considered a junior synonym of B. lentus.

After the turn of the 20th century, Pittsburgh's Carnegie Museum of Natural History sent fossil hunter Earl Douglass to Utah to excavate the Carnegie Quarry in the area now known as Dinosaur National Monument. Four neck vertebrae, each 1 meter (3 feet) long, were collected in 1912 near a specimen of Diplodocus, but a few years later, William Jacob Holland realized they belonged to a different species. Meanwhile, the type specimen of Barosaurus had finally been prepared at Yale in the winter of 1917 and was fully described by Richard Swann Lull in 1919. Based on Lull's description, Holland referred the vertebrae (CM 1198), along with a second partial skeleton found by Douglass in 1918 (CM 11984), to Barosaurus. This second Carnegie specimen remains in the rock wall at Dinosaur National Monument and was not fully prepared until the 1980s.

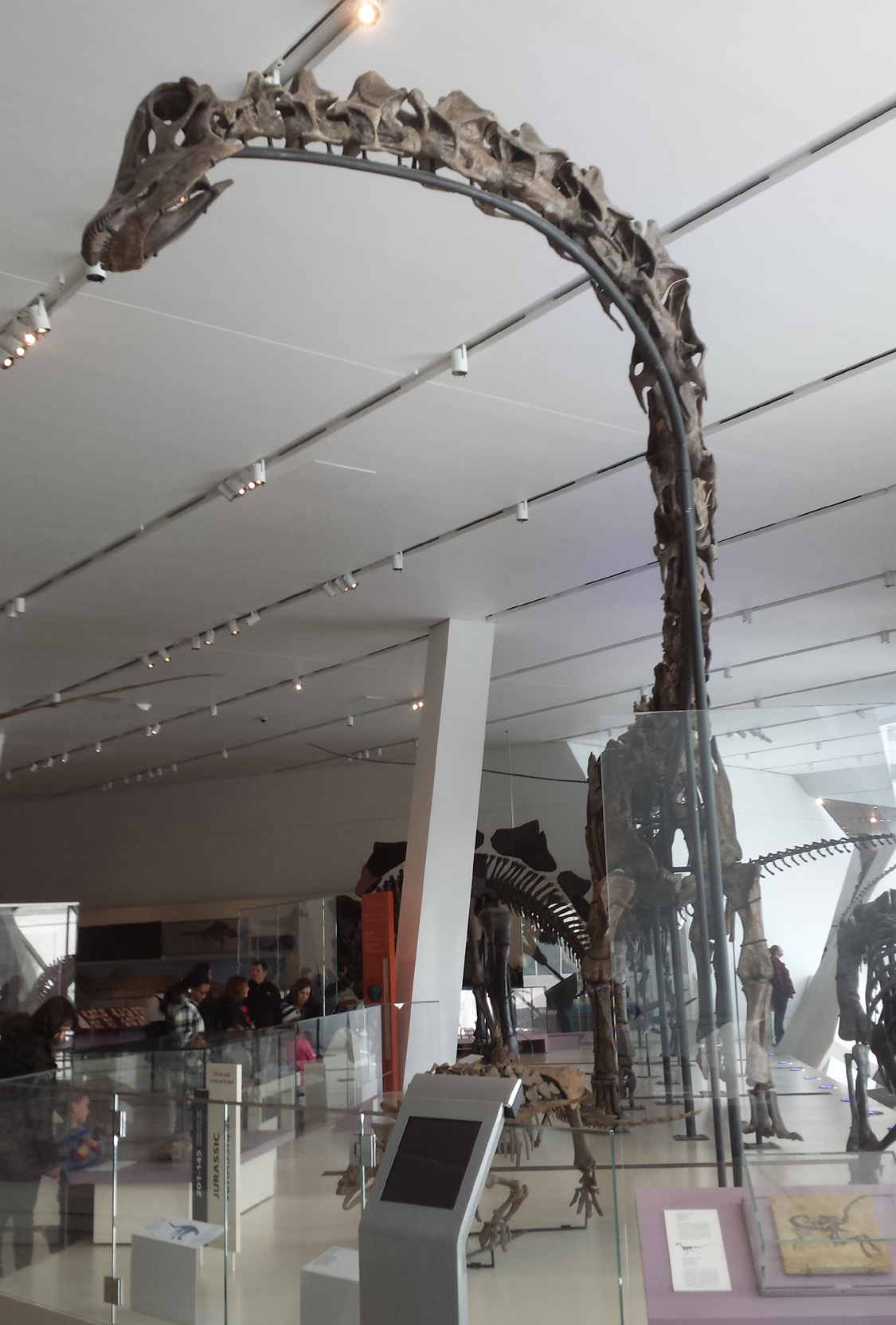
ROM 3670 (nicknamed Gordo), Royal Ontario Museum skeleton, Toronto

The most complete specimen of Barosaurus lentus was excavated from the Carnegie Quarry in 1923 by Douglass, now working for the University of Utah after the death of U.S. Steel founder Andrew Carnegie, who had been financing Douglass' earlier work in Pittsburgh. Material from this specimen was originally spread across three institutions. Most of the back vertebrae, ribs, pelvis, hindlimb and most of the tail stayed at the University of Utah, while the neck vertebrae, some back vertebrae, the shoulder girdle and forelimb were shipped to the National Museum of Natural History in Washington D.C., and a small section of tail vertebrae ended up in the Carnegie Museum in Pittsburgh. However, in 1929 Barnum Brown arranged for all of the material to be shipped to the American Museum of Natural History in New York City, where it remains today. A cast of this specimen (AMNH 6341) was controversially mounted in the lobby of the American Museum, rearing up to defend its young (AMNH 7530, now classified as Kaatedocus siberi) from an attacking Allosaurus fragilis.

=== Later discoveries ===
More recently, more vertebrae and a pelvis were recovered in South Dakota. This material (SDSM 25210 and 25331) is stored in the collection of the South Dakota School of Mines and Technology in Rapid City.

Darren Naish has noted a common error in books of the late 20th century to depict Barosaurus as a kind of brachiosaur-like short tailed sauropod with raphes on its neck and body, and often curving the upper half of its neck downwards into a U-shape, citing it as an example of a Palaeoart meme. This originated with a drawing by Robert Bakker in a 1968 article, in which two Barosaurus appeared to have short tails due to a mix of foreshortening and one obscuring the other.

Another specimen excavated by Earl Douglass at Carnegie Quarry in the early 20th century was acquired by the Royal Ontario Museum (ROM) in Toronto in a 1962 trade with the Carnegie Museum. At the ROM, the specimen (ROM 3670) remained in storage, with many of the bones lacking a label, and was subsequently forgotten. In 2007, the newly appointed curator of the ROM, paleontologist David Evans, was flying to the U.S. Badlands when he discovered a literature reference to a Barosaurus skeleton in the ROM collection. After returning to Toronto, Evans found many fragments of the skeleton throughout the storage areas. In the rush to put the dinosaur on exhibit within eight weeks before the opening of the museum's new dinosaur exhibition, not all of the many skeletal fragments were mounted. The ROM specimen is nicknamed "Gordo" after Gordon Edmunds, the museum curator who arranged for the skeleton to be brought to the ROM. The specimen is about 40% complete, but as a skull of Barosaurus has never been found, the ROM specimen wears the head of a Diplodocus. Each bone is mounted on a separate armature so that it can be removed from the skeleton for study and then replaced without disturbing the rest of the skeleton. Nearly 27.5 m (90 ft) in length, the skeletal mount was announced to be the largest dinosaur mount in Canada, and is a centrepiece of the ROM's dinosaur exhibit, in the James and Louise Temerty Galleries of the Age of Dinosaurs. John McIntosh believes that the ROM's skeleton is the same individual represented by four neck vertebrae labeled "CM 1198" in the collection of the Carnegie Museum.

=== Misidentified discoveries in Africa ===
In 1907, German paleontologist Eberhard Fraas discovered the skeletons of two sauropods on an expedition to the Tendaguru Beds in German East Africa (now Tanzania). He classified both specimens in the new genus Gigantosaurus, with each skeleton representing a new species (G. africanus and G. robustus). However, this genus name had already been given to the fragmentary remains of a sauropod from England. Both species were moved to a new genus, Tornieria, in 1911. Upon further study of these remains and many other sauropod fossils from the hugely productive Tendaguru Beds, Werner Janensch moved the species once again, this time to the North American genus Barosaurus. In 1991, "Gigantosaurus" robustus was recognized as a titanosaur and placed in a new genus, Janenschia, as J. robusta. Meanwhile, many paleontologists suspected "Barosaurus" africanus was also distinct from the North American genus, which was confirmed when the material was redescribed in 2006. The African species, although closely related to Barosaurus lentus and Diplodocus from North America, is now once again known as Tornieria africana. A species of Barosaurus was also allegedly identified from the Kadsi Formation in Zimbabwe in 1987. However, this material is poorly preserved and fragmentary and was not adequately diagnosed as such, and so its referral to Barosaurus is doubtful. It may represent Tornieria.

== Description ==
Size comparison

Barosaurus was an enormous animal, with some adults measuring about 25–27 m (82–89 ft) in length and weighing about 12–20 metric tons (13–22 short tons). The estimated tail length of Barosaurus makes up about half the total body length. Barosaurus was differently proportioned than its close relative Diplodocus, with a longer neck and shorter tail, but was about the same length overall. It was longer than Apatosaurus, but its skeleton was less robust.

Sauropod skulls are rarely preserved, and scientists have yet to discover a Barosaurus skull. Related diplodocids like Apatosaurus and Diplodocus had long, low skulls with peg-like teeth confined to the front of the jaws. In 2017, American researcher Keegan M. Melstrom and colleagues assigned an incomplete juvenile diplodocid skeleton (DINO 2921) that had been found at Dinosaur National Monument to Barosaurus. In the same paper, the authors stated that a juvenile diplodocid skull (CM 11255) may belong to the same individual as DINO 2921. However, this cannot be confirmed until the discovery of definitive adult Barosaurus skull material. Tschopp and colleagues (2015) opted to consider CM 11255 an indeterminate diplodocine, although they did mention that some incomplete Barosaurus cranial remains have been mentioned from Howe Quarry.

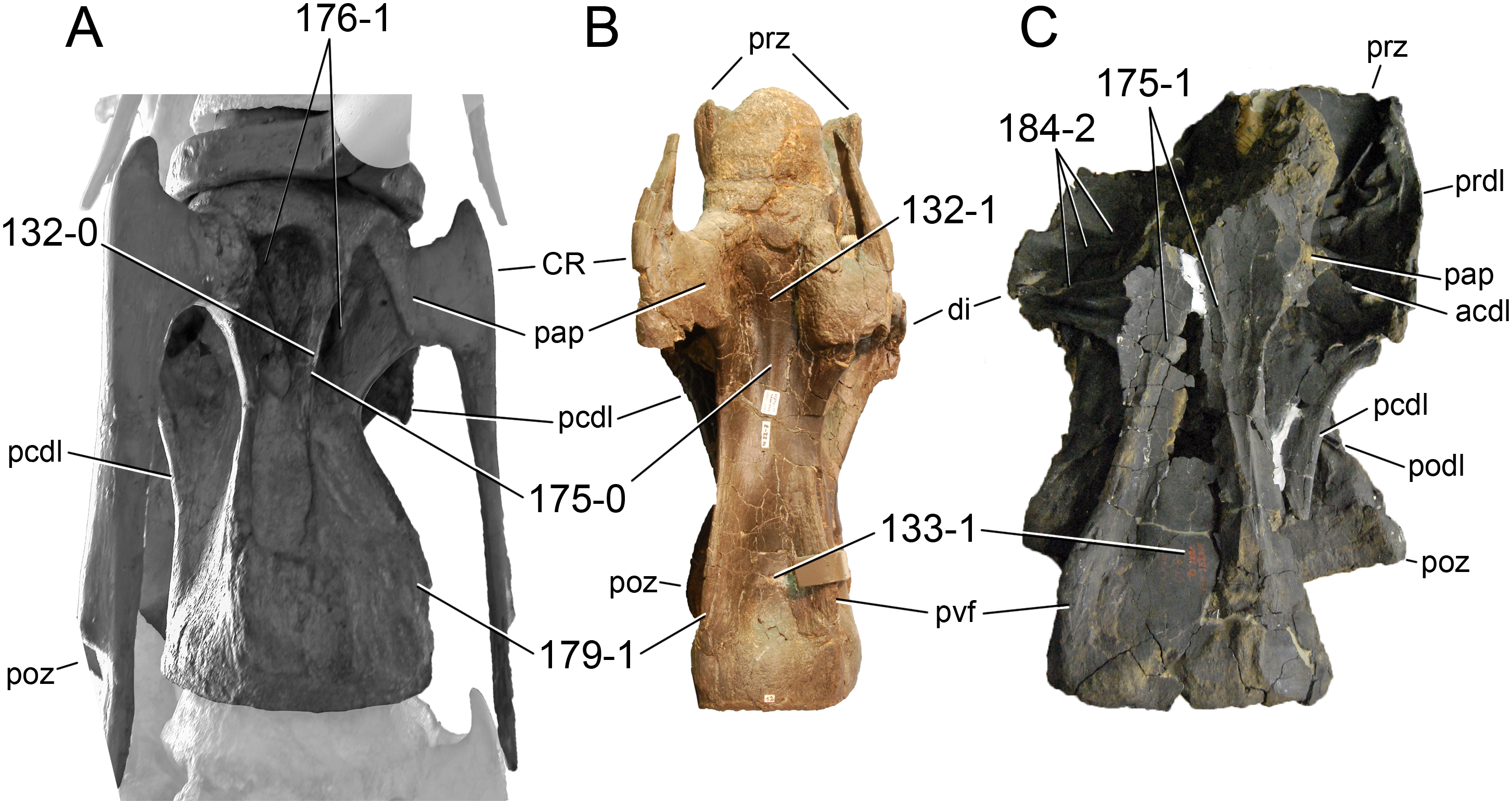
Posterior (back) cervical vertebrae of the diplodocoids Dicraeosaurus, Kaatedocus, and Barosaurus in ventral (bottom) view.

Most of the distinguishing skeletal features of Barosaurus were in the vertebrae, although a complete vertebral column has never been found. Diplodocus and Apatosaurus both had 15 cervical (neck) and 10 dorsal (trunk) vertebrae, while Barosaurus had only 9 dorsals. A dorsal may have been converted into a cervical vertebra, for a total of 16 vertebrae in the neck. Barosaurus cervicals were similar to those of Diplodocus, but some were up to 50% longer. The neural spines protruding from the top of the vertebrae were neither as tall or as complex in Barosaurus as they were in Diplodocus. In contrast to its neck vertebrae, Barosaurus had shorter caudal (tail) vertebrae than Diplodocus, resulting in a shorter tail. The chevron bones lining the underside of the tail were forked and had a prominent forward spike, much like the closely related Diplodocus. The tail probably ended in a long whiplash, much like Apatosaurus, Diplodocus and other diplodocids, some of which had up to 80 tail vertebrae.

The limb bones of Barosaurus were virtually indistinguishable from those of Diplodocus. Both were quadrupedal, with columnar limbs adapted to support the enormous bulk of the animals. Barosaurus had proportionately longer forelimbs than other diplodocids, although they were still shorter than most other groups of sauropods. There was a single carpal bone in the wrist, and the metacarpals were more slender than those of Diplodocus. Barosaurus feet have never been discovered, but like other sauropods, it would have been digitigrade, with all four feet each bearing five small toes. A large claw adorned the inside digit on the manus (forefoot) while smaller claws tipped the inside three digits of the pes (hindfoot).

== Classification ==
Barosaurus is a member of the sauropod family Diplodocidae, and sometimes placed with Diplodocus in the subfamily Diplodocinae. Diplodocids are characterized by long tails with over 70 vertebrae, shorter forelimbs than other sauropods, and numerous features of the skull. Diplodocines like Barosaurus and Diplodocus have slenderer builds and longer necks and tails than apatosaurines, the other subfamily of diplodocids.

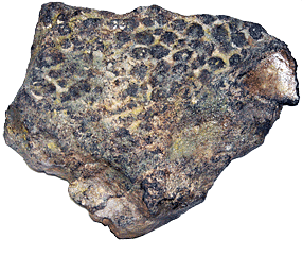
Skin impression

Below is a cladogram of Diplodocinae after Tschopp, Mateus, and Benson (2015).

- Diplodocinae
  - Unnamed species
  - - Tornieria africana
    - - - Supersaurus lourinhanensis
        - Supersaurus vivianae
      - - Leinkupal laticauda
        - - Galeamopus hayi
          - - - Diplodocus carnegii
              - Diplodocus hallorum
            - - Kaatedocus siberi
              - Barosaurus lentus

The systematics (evolutionary relationships) of Diplodocidae are becoming better established. Diplodocus has long been regarded as the closest relative of Barosaurus. Barosaurus is monospecific, containing only the type species, B. lentus, while at least three species belong to the genus Diplodocus. Another diplodocid genus, Seismosaurus, is considered by many paleontologists to be a junior synonym of Diplodocus as a possible fourth species. Tornieria (formerly "Barosaurus" africanus) and Australodocus from the famous Tendaguru Beds of Tanzania in eastern Africa have also been classified as diplodocines. With its elongated neck vertebrae, Tornieria may have been particularly closely related to Barosaurus. The other subfamily of diplodocids is Apatosaurinae, which includes Apatosaurus and Supersaurus. Diplodocid fossils are found in North America, Europe, and Africa. More distantly related within Diplodocoidea are the families Dicraeosauridae and Rebbachisauridae.

== Paleobiology ==
=== Feeding ===
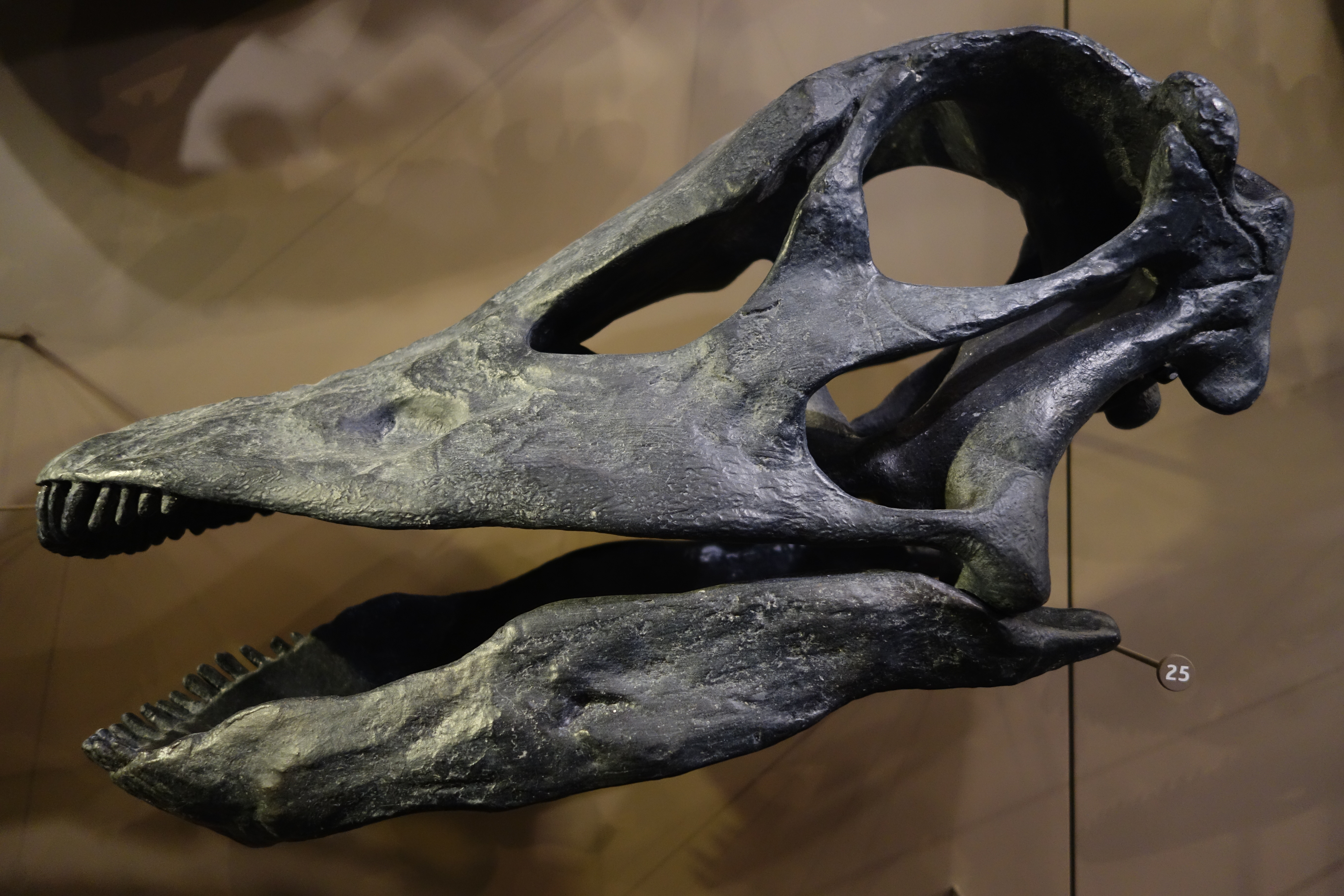
Skull cast, Natural History Museum of Utah

In a 2016 preprint, Mike Taylor and Mathew Wedel argued that the structure of the cervical vertebrae of Barosaurus allowed for a significant degree of lateral flexibility in the neck, but restricted vertical flexibility. This suggests a different feeding style for this genus when compared to other diplodocids. Barosaurus swept its neck in long arcs at ground level when feeding, in a "vacuum-cleaner" like fashion. The restriction in vertical flexibility suggests that Barosaurus did not primarily feed on vegetation that was high off the ground.

=== Posture ===
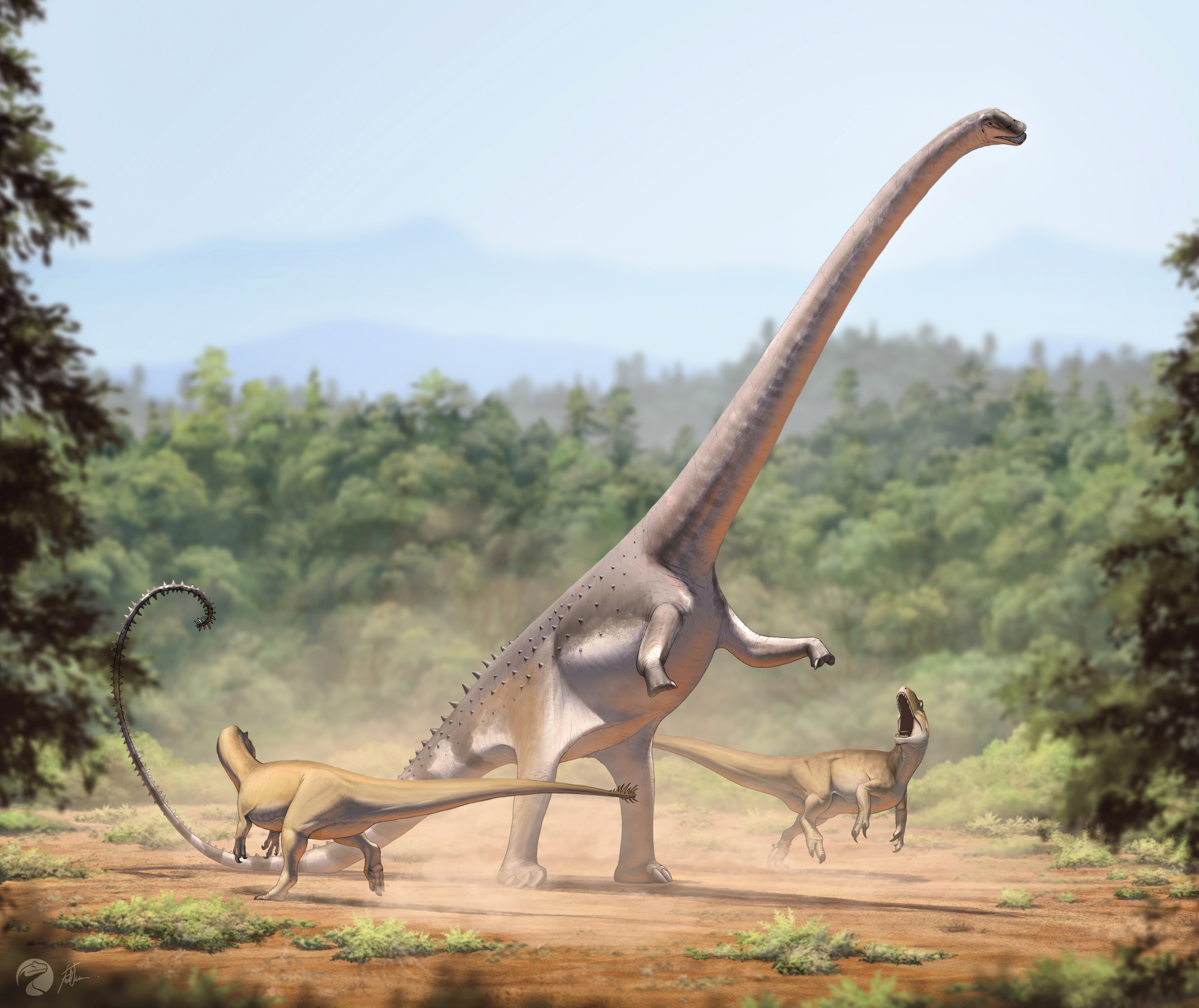
Life reconstruction of an individual rearing up to defend itself against a pair of Allosaurus

While diplodocids were traditionally depicted as having a sprawled, lizard-like gait, later studies often portrayed them with their necks held high up in the air, allowing them to graze from tall trees. Studies looking at the morphology of sauropod necks have concluded that the neutral posture of Barosaurus' close relative Diplodocus neck was close to horizontal, rather than vertical, and scientists such as Kent Stevens have used this to argue that sauropods including Barosaurus did not raise their heads much above shoulder level. A nuchal ligament may have held the neck in this position. One approach to understanding the possible ligament structure in ancient sauropods is to study the ligaments and their attachments to bones in extant animals to see if they resemble any bony structures in sauropods or other dinosaur species like Parasaurolophus. If Diplodocus relied on a mammal-like nuchal ligament, it would have been for passively sustaining the weight of its head and neck. This ligament is found in many hoofed mammals, such as bison and horses. In mammals, it typically consists of a funiculus cord that runs from the external occipital crest of the skull to elongate vertebral neural spines or "withers" in the shoulder region plus sheet-like extensions called laminae run from the cord to the neural spines on some or all of the cervical vertebrae. However, most sauropods do not have withers in the shoulders, so if they possessed a similar ligament, it would differ substantially, perhaps anchoring in the hip region.

Another hypothesized neck-supporting ligament is an avian-like elastic ligament, such as that seen in Struthio camelus. This ligament acts similarly to the mammal-like nuchal ligament but comprises short segments of ligament that connect the bases of the neural spines, and therefore does not need a robust attachment zone like those seen in mammals. A 2009 study found that all tetrapods appear to hold the base of their necks at the maximum possible vertical extension when in a normal, alert posture, and argued that the same would hold true for sauropods barring any unknown, unique characteristics that set the soft tissue anatomy of their necks apart from other animals. The study found faults with Stevens' assumptions regarding the potential range of motion in sauropod necks, and based on comparing skeletons to living animals the study also argued that soft tissues could have increased flexibility more than the bones alone suggest. For these reasons they argued that Diplodocus would have held its neck at a more elevated angle than previous studies have concluded. However, this idea might be contradicted due to the inner ear of diplodocoids actually being in alignment for a horizontal neck pose. Also, it is not necessarily accurate to say that the alert pose is the osteologically normal position.

The very long neck of Barosaurus is the source of much controversy among scientists. A 1992 Columbia University study of diplodocid neck structure indicated that the longest necks would have required a 1.6-ton heart – a tenth of the animal's body weight. The study proposed that animals like these would have had rudimentary auxiliary "hearts" in their necks, whose only purpose was to pump blood up to the next "heart". Some argue that the near-horizontal posture of the head and neck would have eliminated the problem of supplying blood to the brain, as it would not be elevated.

== Paleoecology ==
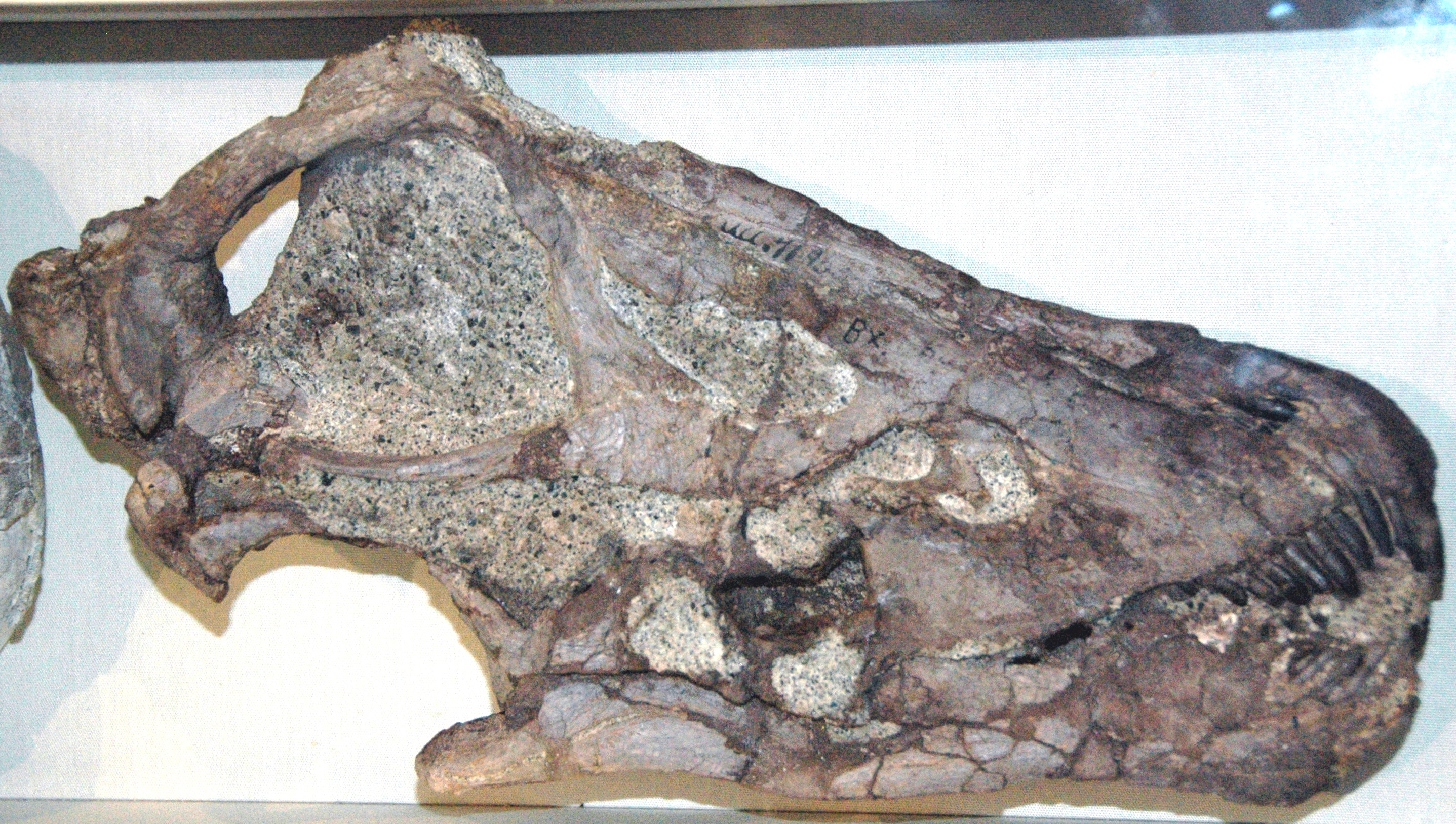
Skull possibly belonging to Barosaurus (specimen CM 11255)

Barosaurus remains are limited to the Morrison Formation, which is widespread in the western United States between the Great Plains and Rocky Mountains. Radiometric dating agrees with biostratigraphic and paleomagnetic studies, indicating that the Morrison was deposited during the Kimmeridgian and early Tithonian stages of the Late Jurassic Period, or approximately 155 to 148 million years ago. Barosaurus fossils are found in late Kimmeridgian to early Tithonian sediments, around 150 million years old.

The Morrison Formation was deposited in floodplains along the edge of the ancient Sundance Sea, an arm of the Arctic Ocean which extended southward to cover the middle of North America as far south as the modern state of Colorado. Due to tectonic uplift to the west, the sea was receding to the north, and had retreated into what is now Canada by the time Barosaurus evolved. The sediments of the Morrison were washed down out of the western highlands, which had been uplifted during the earlier Nevadan orogeny and were now eroding. Very high atmospheric concentrations of carbon dioxide in the Late Jurassic led to high temperatures around the globe, due to the greenhouse effect. One study, estimating CO_{2} concentrations of 1120 parts per million, predicted average winter temperatures in western North America of 20 °C (68 °F) and summer temperatures averaging 40–45 °C (104–113 °F). A more recent study suggested even higher CO_{2} concentrations of up to 3180 parts per million. Warm temperatures that led to significant evaporation year-round, along with possible rain shadow effect from the mountains to the west, led to a semi-arid climate with only seasonal rainfall.

The Morrison Formation records an environment and time dominated by gigantic sauropod dinosaurs such as Camarasaurus, Diplodocus, Apatosaurus and Brachiosaurus. Dinosaurs that lived alongside Barosaurus included the herbivorous ornithischians Camptosaurus, Dryosaurus, Stegosaurus and Othnielosaurus, and predators in this paleoenvironment included the theropods Saurophaganax, Allosaurus, Torvosaurus, Ceratosaurus, Marshosaurus, Stokesosaurus and Ornitholestes. Allosaurus accounted for 70 to 75% of theropod specimens and was almost at the top trophic level of the Morrison food web. Other vertebrates that shared this paleoenvironment included ray-finned fishes, frogs, salamanders, turtles, sphenodonts, lizards, terrestrial and aquatic crocodylomorphs, and several species of pterosaur. Early mammals were present such as docodonts, multituberculates, symmetrodonts, and triconodonts. The flora of the period has been revealed by fossils of green algae, fungi, mosses, horsetails, cycads, ginkgoes, and several families of conifers. Vegetation varied from river-lining forests of tree ferns, and ferns (gallery forests), to fern savannas with occasional trees such as the Araucaria-like conifer Brachyphyllum.
