= Mpandi Formation =

Zimbabwean geological formation

- Stratigraphic range: Late Triassic-Early Jurassic
- Type: Geological formation

Lithology
- Primary: Sandstone

Location
- Coordinates: 22.2°S 29.5°E
- Approximate paleocoordinates: 36.6°S 3.4°E
- Region: Matabeleland South
- Country: Zimbabwe
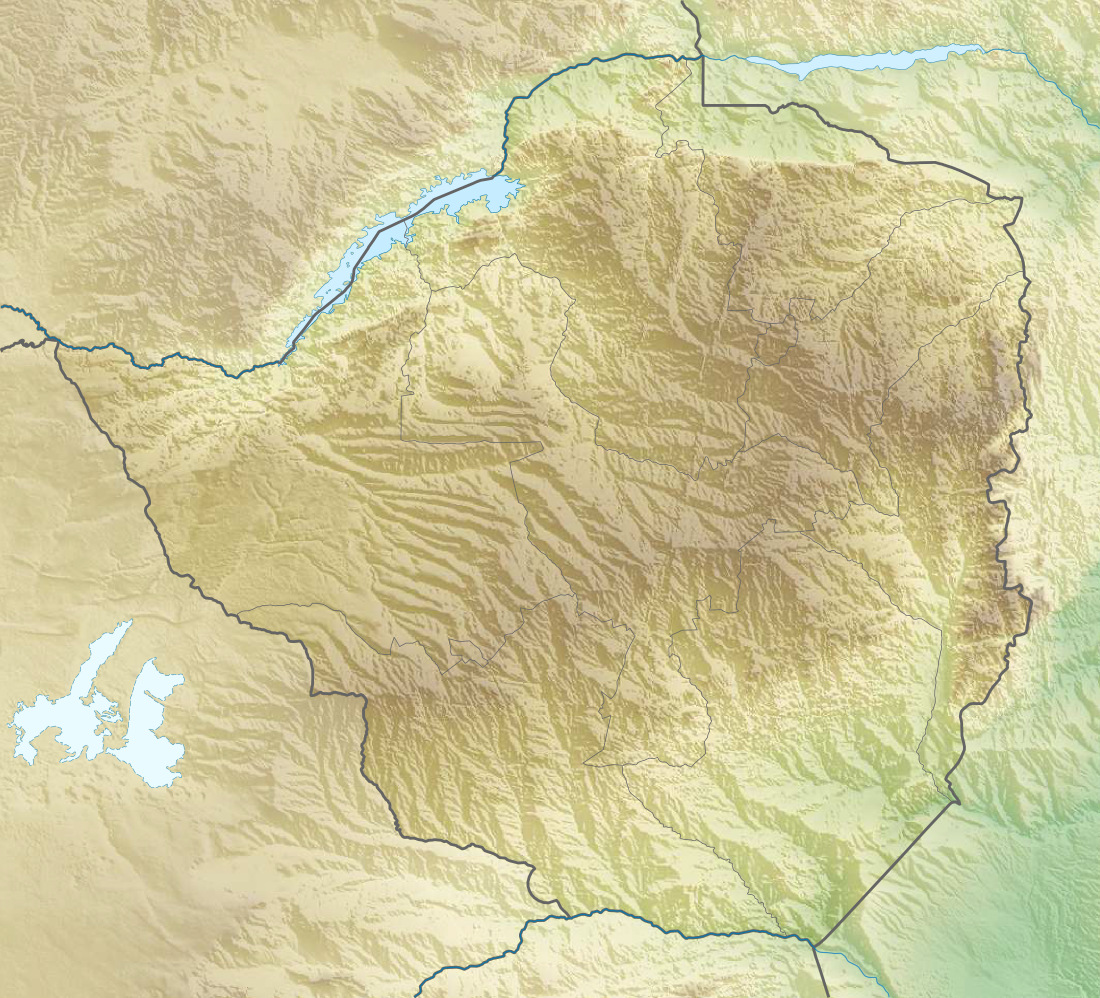
- Mpandi Formation (Africa) Mpandi Formation (Zimbabwe)

The Mpandi Formation is a geological formation in Zimbabwe. It dates back to the Late Triassic to Early Jurassic.

== Fossil content ==
Dinosaurs of the Mpandi Formation
Genus	Species	Location	Stratigraphic position	Abundance	Notes	Images
Euskelosaurus	E. cf. browni	Matabeleland South				

Other fossils

- Massospondylus sp.
- Rauisuchidae indet.

== See also ==
- List of dinosaur-bearing rock formations
- List of fossiliferous stratigraphic units in Zimbabwe
- Geology of Zimbabwe
- Beaufort Group
- Pebbly Arkose Formation
