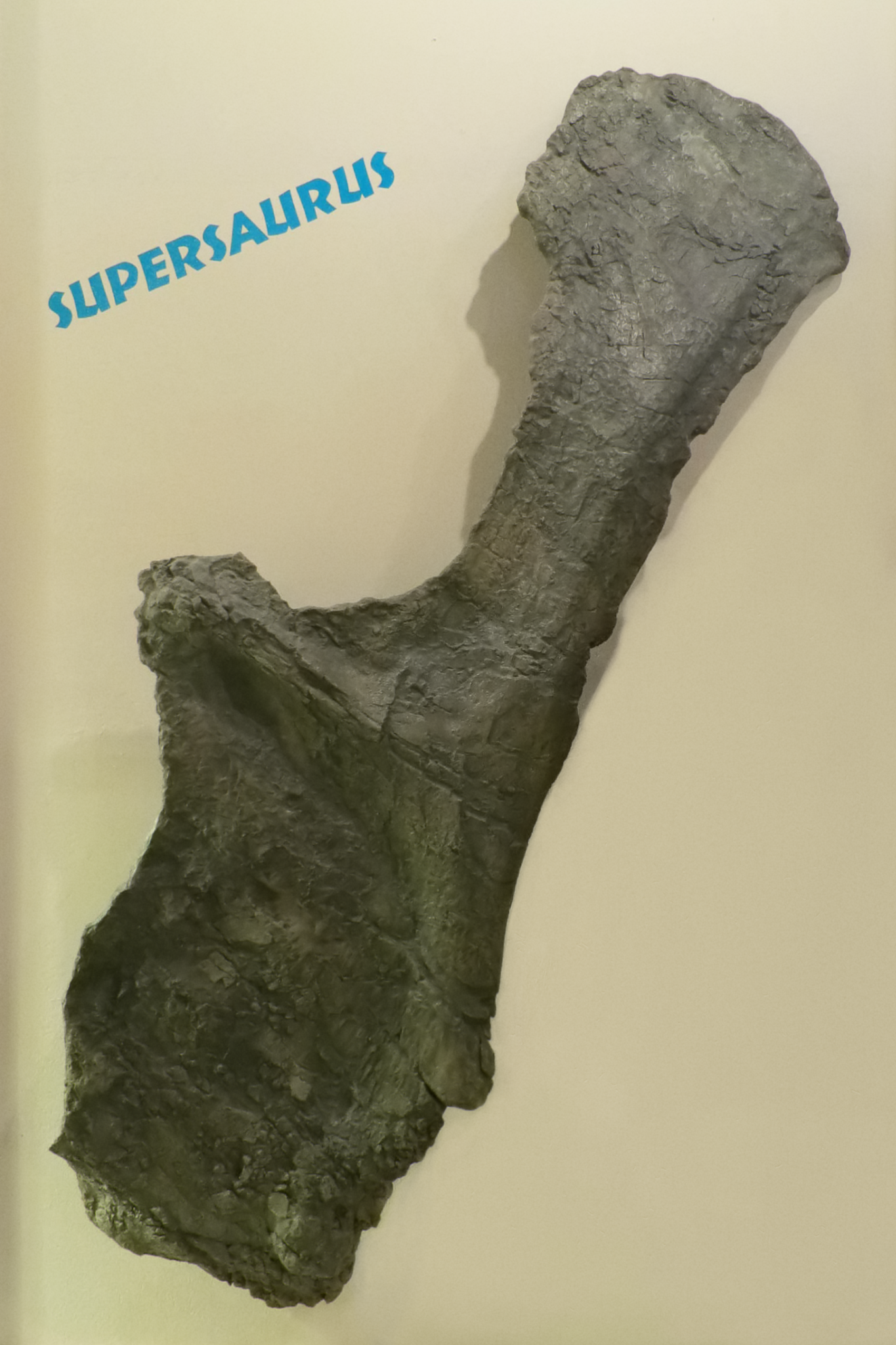
- A cast of BYU 9025, a scapulocoracoid, the holotype of Supersaurus, Dinosaur Journey Museum

Scientific classification
- Kingdom: Animalia
- Phylum: Chordata
- Class: Reptilia
- Clade: Dinosauria
- Clade: Saurischia
- Clade: †Sauropodomorpha
- Clade: †Sauropoda
- Superfamily: †Diplodocoidea
- Family: †Diplodocidae
- Subfamily: †Diplodocinae
- Genus: †Supersaurus; Jensen, 1985

Type species
- †Supersaurus vivianae Jensen, 1985

Other Species
- †Supersaurus lourinhanensis? Bonaparte & Mateus, 1999

Synonyms
- Genus synonymy: Dystylosaurus Jensen, 1985; Ultrasauros (Jensen, 1985) Olshevsky, 1991 [formerly Ultrasaurus, preoccupied]; Dinheirosaurus? Bonaparte & Mateus, 1999; Species synonymy (S. vivianae): Dystylosaurus edwini Jensen, 1985; Ultrasauros macintoshi (Jensen, 1985) Olshevsky, 1991 [formerly Ultrasaurus, preoccupied]

= Supersaurus =

Supersaurus Temporal range: Late Jurassic, 153–145 Ma

Extinct genus of dinosaurs

Supersaurus (meaning "super lizard") is a genus of diplodocid sauropod dinosaur that lived in North America during the Late Jurassic period. The type species, S. vivianae, was first discovered by Vivian Jones of Delta, Colorado, in the middle Morrison Formation of Colorado in 1972. The fossil remains came from the Brushy Basin Member of the formation, dating between 153 and 145 million years ago. It is among the longest dinosaurs ever discovered, with the three known specimens reaching 33–40 meters (108–131 ft) in length, with the largest individual possibly exceeding 40 meters (130 ft) in size. Mass estimates for the WDC and BYU specimens tend to be around 35–44 metric tons (39–49 short tons) in body mass. A potential second species, S. lourinhanensis (Dinheirosaurus), is known from Portugal and has been dated to a similar time.

== Discovery ==
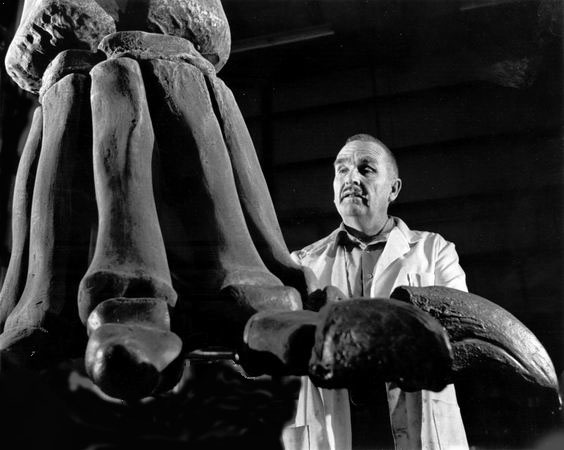
James A. Jensen with the reconstructed front leg of Ultrasauros

Supersaurus is present in stratigraphic zone 5 of the Morrison, dating from the Tithonian. The original fossil remains of Supersaurus were discovered in the Dry Mesa Quarry in 1972. This find yielded only a few bones: mainly the shoulder girdle, an ischium, and tail vertebrae. Paleontologist James A. Jensen described Supersaurus; he designated a scapulocoracoid BYU 9025 (originally labeled as BYU 5500) as the type specimen. This shoulder girdle stood some 2.4 meters (7.9 ft) tall, if placed on end. The specimen was given the name "Supersaurus" informally as early as 1973, but was not officially described and named until more than a decade later, in 1985. Sauropod researcher Jack McIntosh at one time thought that the BYU Supersaurus material might represent a large species of Barosaurus but later felt that there was evidence for Supersaurus being a valid genus.

A much more complete specimen WDC DMJ-021, was found in Converse County, Wyoming in 1986 by Brandon Flyr and Bart Lesco while out hiking and was reported to the people who owned the land at the time. The discovery was later named "Jimbo" in 1996 by the family that purchased the land, it was described and assigned to Supersaurus in 2007. The specimen represented approximately 30% of the skeleton. Its bones are being held at the Wyoming Dinosaur Center. A comparison of WDC DMJ-021 and other specimens previously assigned to Supersaurus was done in order to help decide what material from the Dry Mesa Quarry belonged to the genus. It indicated that a series of tail vertebrae and an ulna may have belonged to some other diplodocid.

=== Ultrasauros ===
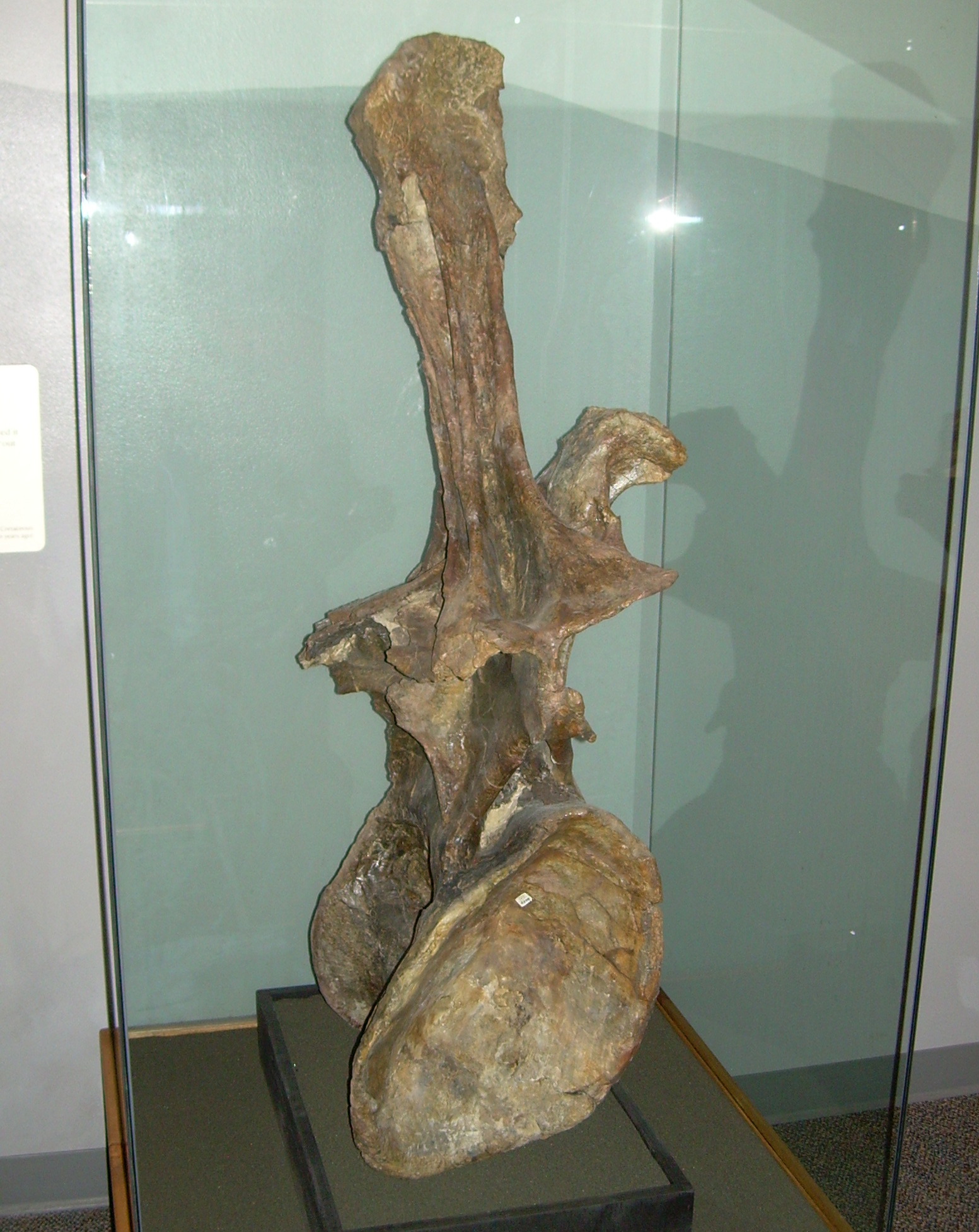
Dorsal vertebra BYU 9044, the holotype of Ultrasauros, now assigned to Supersaurus Museum of Ancient Life

Jensen, who described the original Supersaurus specimen, simultaneously reported the discovery of another gigantic sauropod, which would later be named "Ultrasaurus" macintoshi (later renamed Ultrasauros macintoshi). The type specimen (the specimen used to define a new species) of Ultrasauros, being a backbone (dorsal vertebra, labeled BYU 9044), was later found to have come from Supersaurus. In fact, it probably belonged to the original Supersaurus specimen, which was discovered in the same quarry in 1972. Therefore, Ultrasauros became a junior synonym of Supersaurus, which had been named first and thus retains priority, and the name Ultrasauros was abandoned.

Other bones that were found at the same location and originally thought to belong to Ultrasauros, like a shoulder girdle (scapulocoracoid, BYU 9462), actually belonged to Brachiosaurus, possibly a large specimen of Brachiosaurus altithorax. The Brachiosaurus bones indicate a large, but not record-breaking individual, a little larger than the "Brachiosaurus" brancai (Giraffatitan brancai) mount in the Berlin's Natural History Museum.

Originally, these Supersaurus and Brachiosaurus bones were believed to represent a single dinosaur that was estimated to reach about 25 to 30 meters (82 to 98 ft) long, 8 meters (26 ft) high at the shoulder, 15 meters (49 ft) in total height, and weighing maybe 70 t (77 short tons). At the time, mass estimates ranged up to 180 tons, which placed it in the same category as the blue whale and the equally problematic Bruhathkayosaurus.

The naming of the chimeric Ultrasauros has a similarly complicated history. Ultrasaurus (with the final "u") was the original choice, and was widely used by the media after the discovery in 1979. However, the name of a new species must be published with a description to become official.

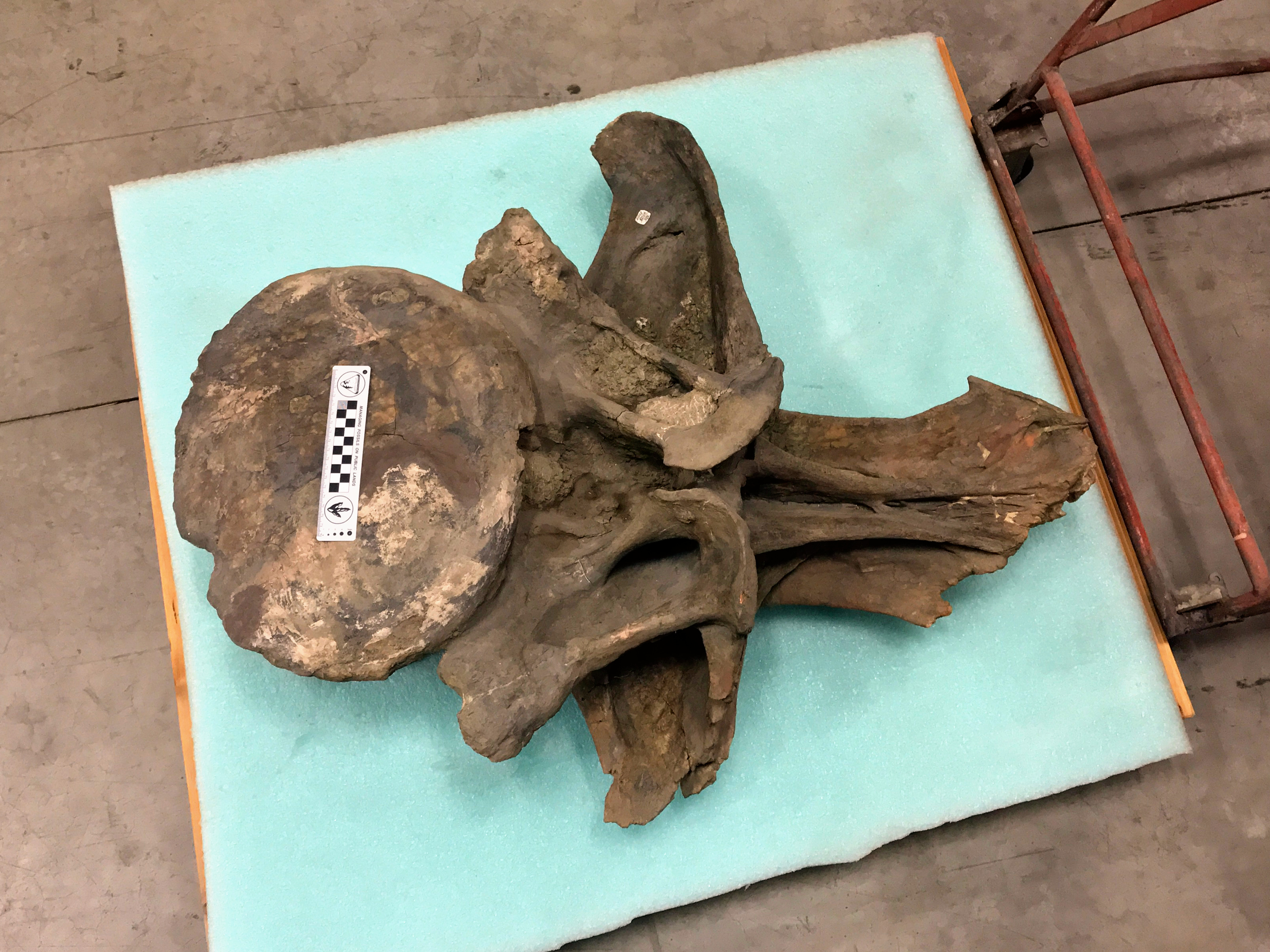
Holotype vertebrae of Dystylosaurus, junior synonym of Supersaurus

Before Jim Jensen published his discovery in 1985, another paleontologist, Kim Haang Mook, used the name Ultrasaurus in a 1983 publication to describe what he believed was a giant dinosaur in South Korea. This was a different, much smaller dinosaur than Jensen's find, but Kim thought it represented a similarly gigantic animal because he confused a humerus for an ulna. While the logic of naming was incorrect, the Ultrasaurus from Kim's find fulfilled the requirements for naming and became regarded as a legitimate, if dubious genus. Thus, because Jensen did not publish his own "Ultrasaurus" find until 1985, Kim's use retained its official priority of name, and Jensen was forced to choose a new name (in technical terms, his original choice was "preoccupied" by Kim's sauropod). In 1991, at his suggestion, George Olshevsky changed one letter, and renamed Jensen's sauropod Ultrasauros, with the final "o".

When it was later discovered that the new name referred to bones from two separate, and already known species, the name Ultrasauros was considered invalid and became a junior synonym for Supersaurus. Since the holotype of the Ultrasaurus was a dorsal vertebrae of the Supersaurus, so Ultrasauros is not a junior synonym for Brachiosaurus. The name Supersaurus was kept instead of Ultrasaurus as the animal is a diplodocid and Ultrasaurus had always referred to a brachiosaurid.

=== Additional synonyms ===
Another diplodocid dinosaur found near the original Supersaurus quarry, known from a backbone (dorsal vertebra type specimen BYU 5750), was named Dystylosaurus edwini and is now also considered to be a specimen of Supersaurus vivianae. Hence, Dystylosaurus has also become a junior synonym of Supersaurus.

== Description ==
Diagram showing the size of Supersaurus (orange) compared with selected giant sauropods

Supersaurus is among the largest dinosaurs known from good remains and quite possibly the longest discovered thus far, with the WDC specimen reaching 33–36 meters (108–118 ft) in length, the BYU specimen reaching perhaps 39 meters (128 ft) and a third specimen potentially exceeding 40 meters (130 ft) in size. The WDC and BYU specimens are estimated to have weighed 35–44 metric tons (39–49 short tons) in body mass.

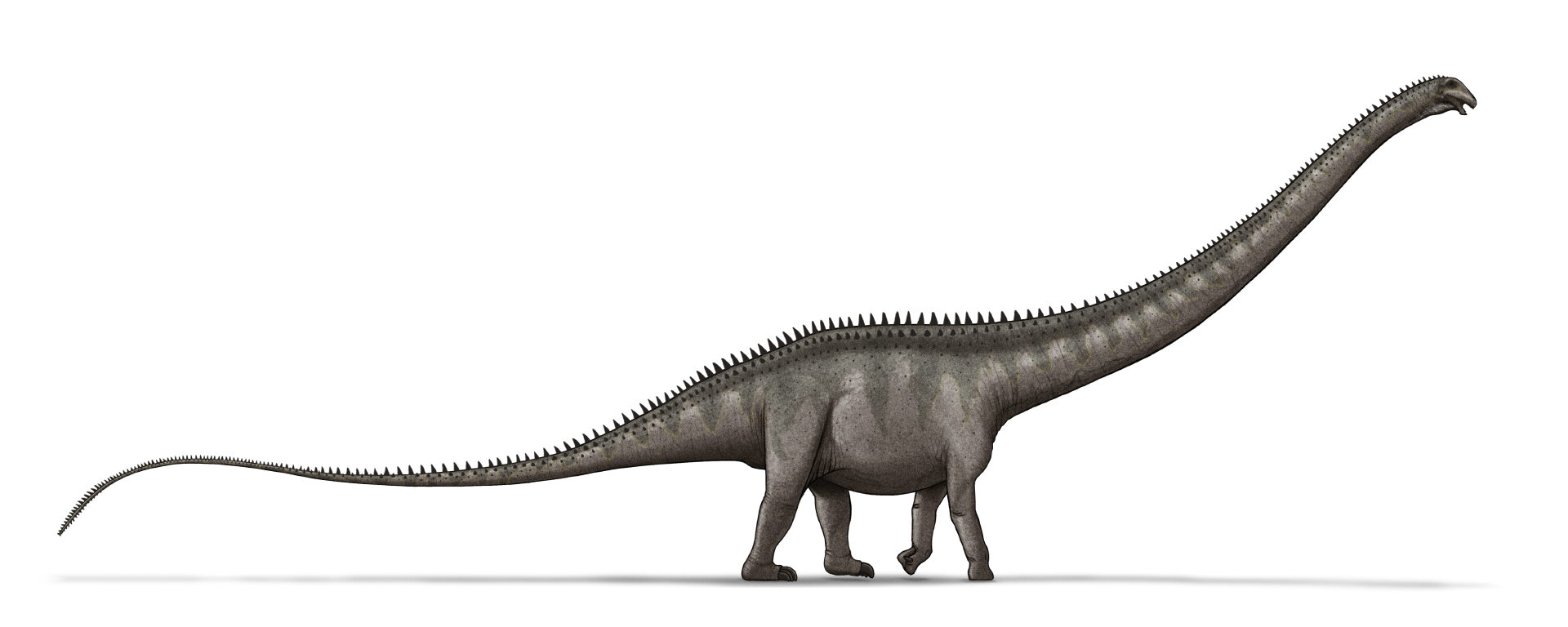
Life restoration of Supersaurus based primarily on Wyoming Dinosaur Center's more complete "Jimbo"

A study in 2024 also found the Jimbo specimen to be skeletally mature at the time of its death and among the oldest known dinosaurs. While the result obtained was 225 years, the study strongly states that a value this high is extremely unlikely and more reflects the limitations of the methodology in calculating the age of exceptionally old individuals. The same study found the age of a 33 meters (108 ft) Diplodocus hallorum to be 60 years old, which makes it among the oldest known dinosaurs too, but considered the age of Jimbo to be even greater due to the extensive remodeling of the bone. In fact, the study suggests Jimbo was so old that its exact age cannot be reliably calculated by the applied methodology. Thus, despite the lack of a truly reliable age value, the Jimbo specimen of Supersaurus can be considered as possibly the oldest dinosaur known thus far. The study also suggests that, due to Jimbo's skeletal maturity, the size range displayed by the three known Supersaurus specimens, which ranges from 33–40 meters (108–131 ft), can be considered an average adult size for the species.

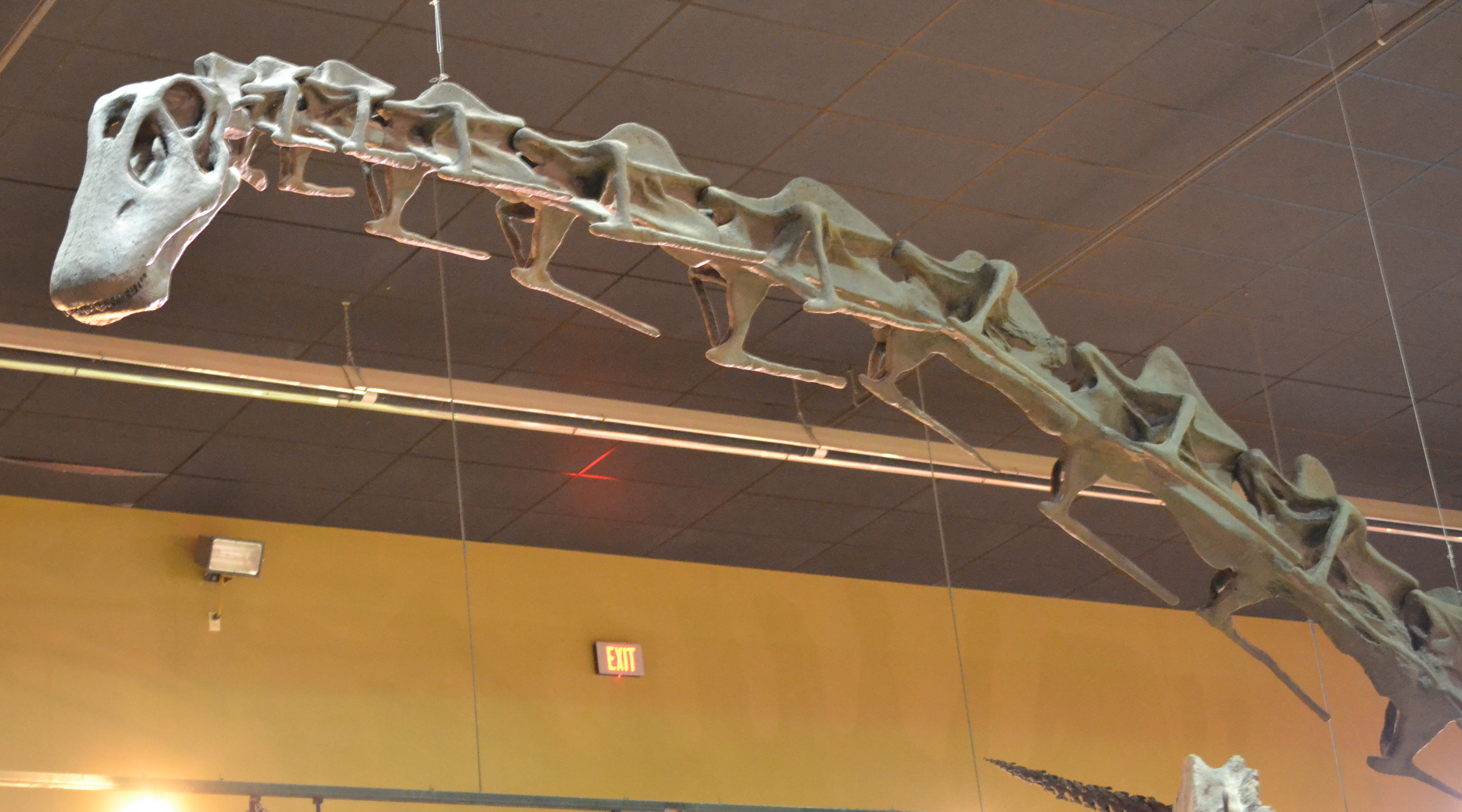
A reconstruction of WDC DMJ-021, nicknamed "Jimbo", Wyoming Dinosaur Center

The first described specimens of Supersaurus were individual bones that suggested a large diplodocid. A large cervical vertebra BYU 9024 from the same quarry was later assigned to Supersaurus. This vertebra measures 1.38 m (4.5 ft) in length and is the longest cervical known. This enormous vertebra was reclassified as a Barosaurus vertebra, by Mike Taylor and Matt Wedel. However Brian Curtice has reassigned it to Supersaurus on the basis of additional specimens. Michael Benton also agreed with the reclassification, giving the Supersaurus BYU 9024 specimen an approximate length of up to an impressive 50 metres (160 ft), which would have made it the longest animal to ever live.

The assignment of the more complete specimen, WDC DMJ-021, to Supersaurus suggests that in most respects it was very similar in anatomy to Apatosaurus but less robustly built with especially elongated cervical vertebrae, resulting in one of the longest-known sauropod necks.

== Classification ==
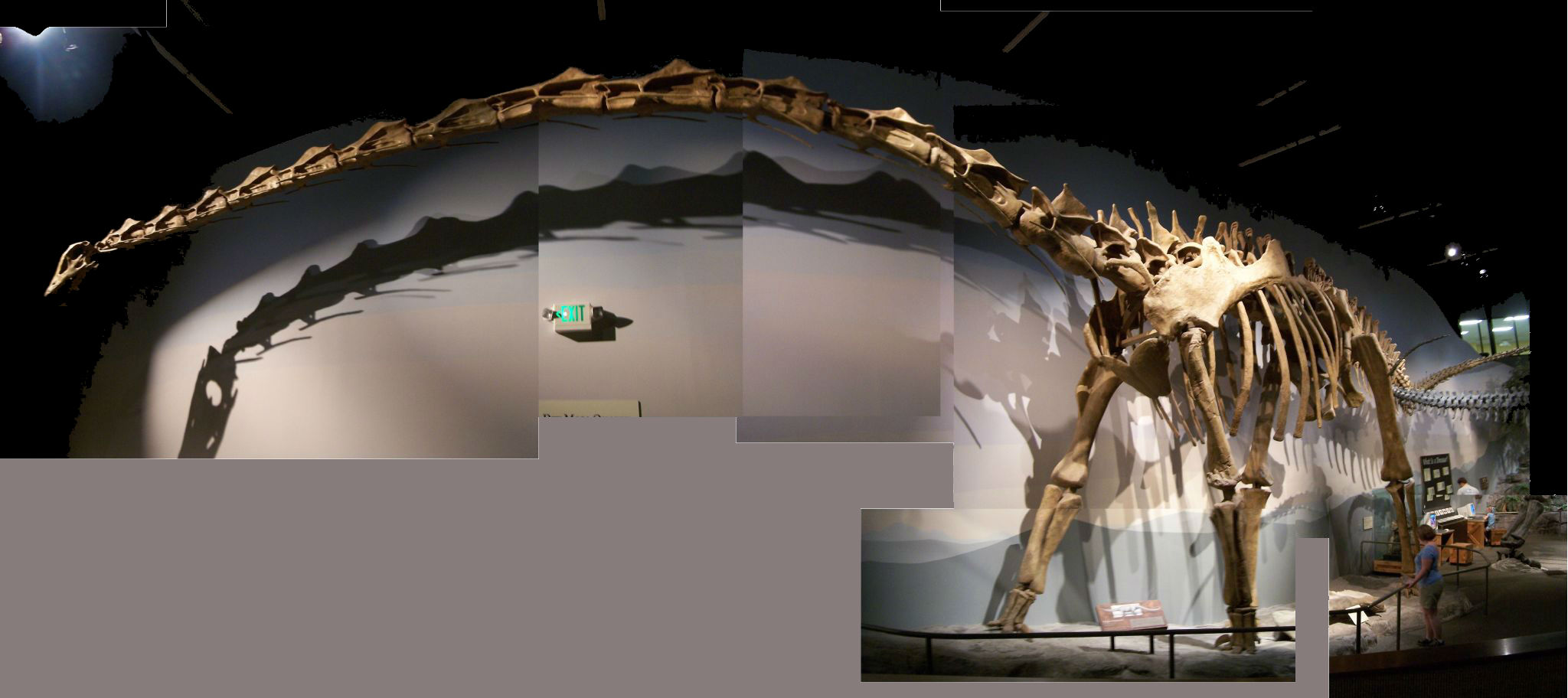
A reconstructed skeleton, Museum of Ancient Life, Utah, USA

Most studies of diplodocid relationships have found it to contain two primary subgroups: Diplodocinae (containing those diplodocids more closely related to Diplodocus than to Apatosaurus) and Apatosaurinae (diplodocids more closely related to Apatosaurus than to Diplodocus). Originally, it was thought that Supersaurus was related to the long-necked diplodocid Barosaurus, and therefore a member of the subfamily Diplodocinae, however, with the assignment of the more complete WDC DMJ-021 most later studies found Supersaurus to be a close relative of the familiar Apatosaurus in the group Apatosaurinae. However, some later studies cast doubt on this paradigm. One comprehensive study of diplodocoid relationships published by Whitlock in 2011 found Apatosaurus itself to lie at the base of the diplodocid family tree, and other "apatosaurines", including Supersaurus, to be progressively more closely related to Diplodocus (making them diplodocines).

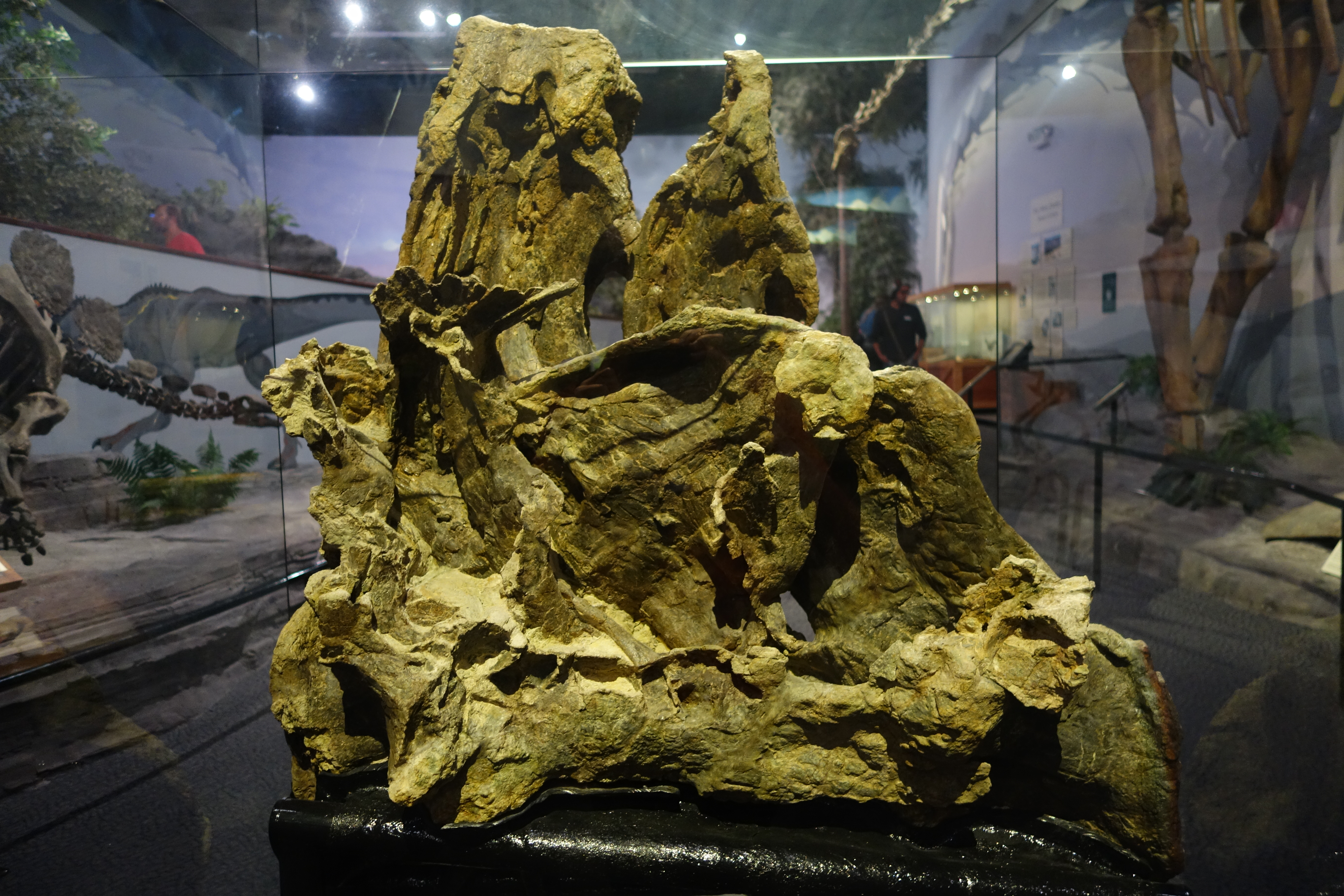
Pelvis of Supersaurus

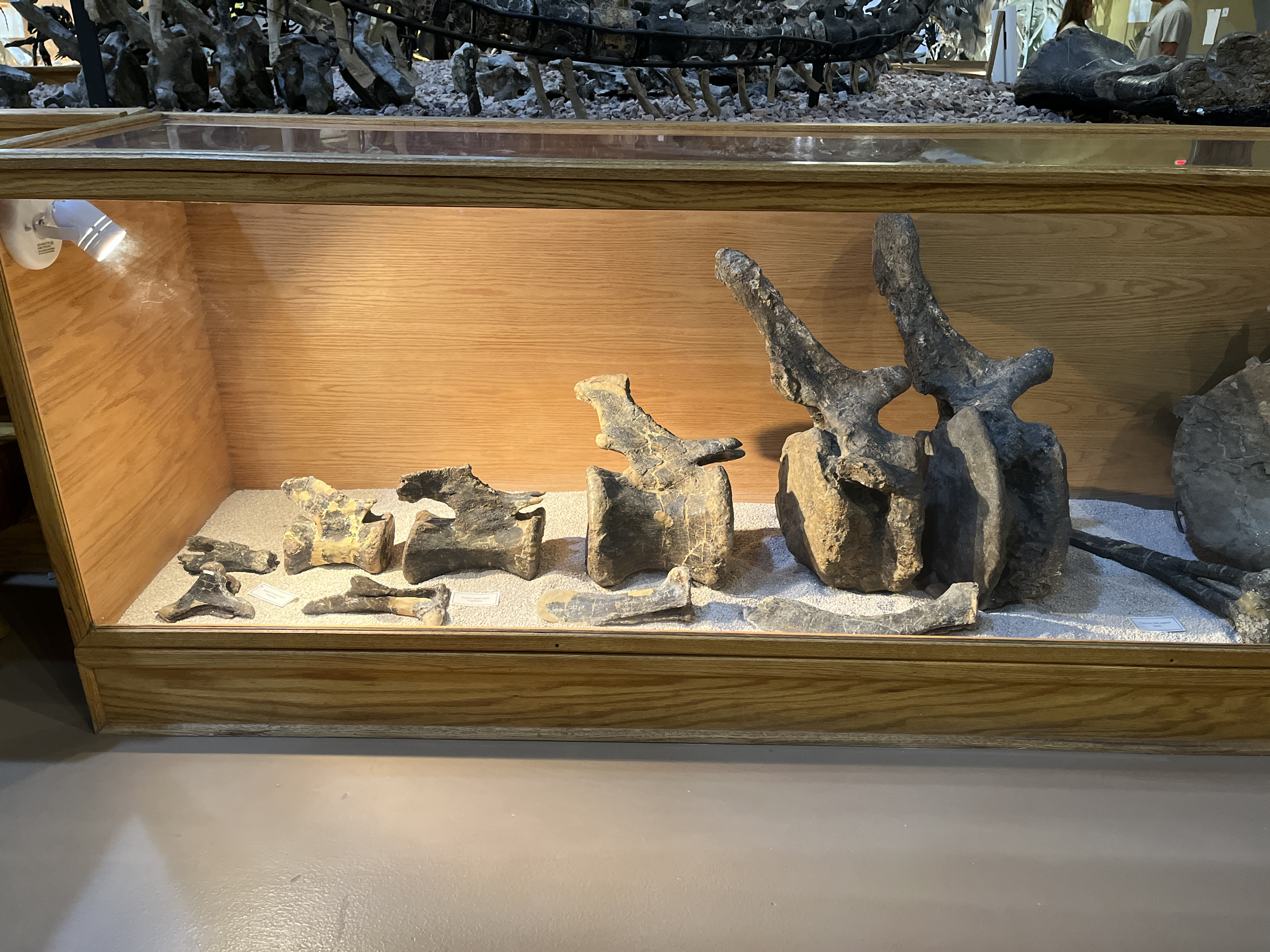
Caudal vertebrae and chevrons

In 2015, a specimen-level phylogenetic study of diplodocids found that Dinheirosaurus lourinhanensis grouped with Supersaurus. The study considered that it should be a new species of Supersaurus, in a new combination S. lourinhanensis.

- Diplodocidae
  - Amphicoelias altus
  - - Apatosaurinae
      - Unnamed species
      - - - Apatosaurus ajax
          - Apatosaurus louisae
        - - Brontosaurus excelsus
          - - Brontosaurus yahnahpin
            - Brontosaurus parvus
    - Diplodocinae
      - Unnamed species
      - - Tornieria africana
        - - - Supersaurus lourinhanensis
            - Supersaurus vivianae
          - - Leinkupal laticauda
            - - Galeamopus hayi
              - - - Diplodocus carnegii
                  - Diplodocus hallorum
                - - Kaatedocus siberi
                  - Barosaurus lentus
