= Gokwe Formation =

Early Cretaceous geologic formation in Zimbabwe

- Stratigraphic range: Early Cretaceous
- Type: Geological formation
- Sub-units: White Sandstone Member

Lithology
- Primary: Sandstone
- Other: Limestone

Location
- Coordinates: 18.2°S 28.9°E
- Approximate paleocoordinates: 36.1°S 4.9°E
- Region: Midlands
- Country: Zimbabwe

Type section
- Named for: Gokwe region
- Gokwe Formation (Zimbabwe)

The Gokwe Formation is an Early Cretaceous geologic formation in Zimbabwe. Remains of an indeterminate abelisaurid theropod dinosaur, represented by teeth and vertebrae, are known from the formation. Titanosaur remains are also known. Sediments of the formation may have been laid down in a small shallow lake, carried by intermittent floods from a land surface surrounding the lake on which aeolian transport of sand took place. More likely the animals died on a dry lake bed, and their bones were exposed to a period of desiccation, later floods would scatter the fragments and incorporate them in sediment.

== See also ==
- List of dinosaur-bearing rock formations
  - List of stratigraphic units with indeterminate dinosaur fossils
- List of fossiliferous stratigraphic units in Zimbabwe
- Geology of Zimbabwe
