= List of fossiliferous stratigraphic units in Zimbabwe =

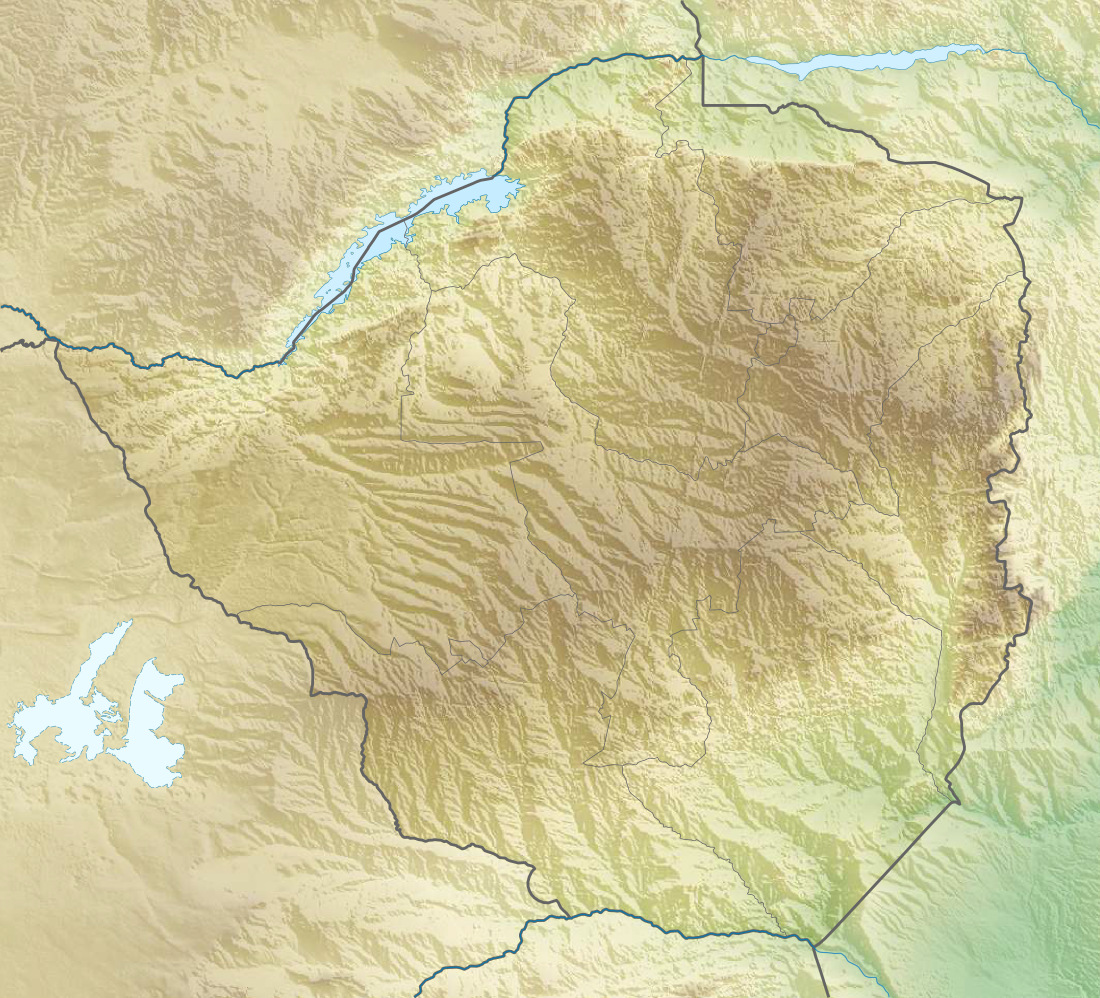
Fossiliferous stratigraphic units in Zimbabwe
Cretaceous
Jurassic
Triassic
Permian

This is a list of fossiliferous stratigraphic units in Zimbabwe.

Group	Formation	Period	Notes
	Gokwe Formation	Early Cretaceous	
	Kadsi Formation	Tithonian	
	Dande Sandstone	Middle-Late Jurassic	
	Mpandi Formation	Late Triassic-Early Jurassic	
Upper Karoo Group	Forest Sandstone/Vulcanodon Beds	Hettangian-Sinemurian	
Upper Karoo Group	Pebbly Arkose Formation	Carnian	
Upper Karoo Group	Angwa Sandstone	Ladinian	
	Nyamandhlovu Sandstone/Pasibas Sandstone	Late Triassic	
Beaufort Group	Madumabisa Mudstone	Capitanian	
Ecca Group		Wordian	
	Wankie Sandstone	Sakmarian-Kungurian	
Black Shale and Coal Group		Sakmarian	
Dwyka Group	Dwyka Formation; Cycle 3	Sakmarian	

== See also ==
- Lists of fossiliferous stratigraphic units in Africa
  - List of fossiliferous stratigraphic units in Botswana
  - List of fossiliferous stratigraphic units in Mozambique
  - List of fossiliferous stratigraphic units in South Africa
  - List of fossiliferous stratigraphic units in Zambia
- Geology of Zimbabwe
