= Palaeopteryx =

Palaeopteryx Temporal range: Late Jurassic, 153 Ma

Scientific classification
- Kingdom: Animalia
- Phylum: Chordata
- Class: Reptilia
- Clade: Dinosauria
- Clade: Saurischia
- Clade: Theropoda
- Clade: Paraves
- Genus: †Palaeopteryx; Jensen, 1981
- Species: †P. thomsoni

Binomial name
- †Palaeopteryx thomsoni Jensen, 1981

Extinct genus of dinosaurs

Palaeopteryx (meaning "ancient wing") is an extinct genus of dubious paravian theropod dinosaur from the Morrison Formation of Colorado. The type species is P. thomsoni.

== Discovery and naming ==
The holotype, BYU 2022, was collected sometime between 1972 and 1976 by a paleontological expedition from Brigham Young University directed by James A. Jensen in the "Dry Mesa" quarry on the Uncompahgre Upwarp in western Colorado (Brushy Basin Member, Morrison Formation). It was found among mixed fossil remains that included pterosaur and dinosaur material.

Palaeopteryx thomsoni was named by Jensen (1981), then re-described by Jensen and Padian (1989). At that time the binomial Palaeopteryx thomsoni was deemed invalid by Jensen.

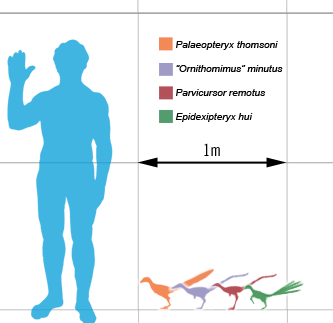
Size of P. thomsoni (orange) compared to other small theropods

One notable specimen found alongside the holotype of Palaeopteryx is the right femur of a derived maniraptoran theropod (BYU 2023). BYU 2023 is missing the distal end and is about 63 millimetres (2 1/2 in) long. It is probably too small to be from the same individual as BYU 2022. BYU 2023 shows apomorphies known only in advanced maniraptorans, including Microvenator, Microraptor, and Archaeopteryx.

== Description ==
The holotype bone is about 45 millimetres (1 3/4 in) long. It was described by Jensen (1981) as an "avian – like" proximal left tibiotarsus. It was then listed by Molnar (1985) in a survey of the earliest known birds. Jensen and Padian (1989) reidentified it as the distal right radius of "a small deinonychosaur or bird".

== Classification ==
Palaeopteryx has been the subject of much confusion on the internet, in the popular scientific press, and among creationist writers. It has been described as a possible bird older than Archaeopteryx, but it cannot be clearly assigned to Avialae, and its horizon is younger than that of Archaeopteryx, though it is still from the Jurassic.

Palaeopteryx is currently classified as a member of the Paraves, within Theropoda.
