= James A. Jensen =

American paleontologist (1918–1998)

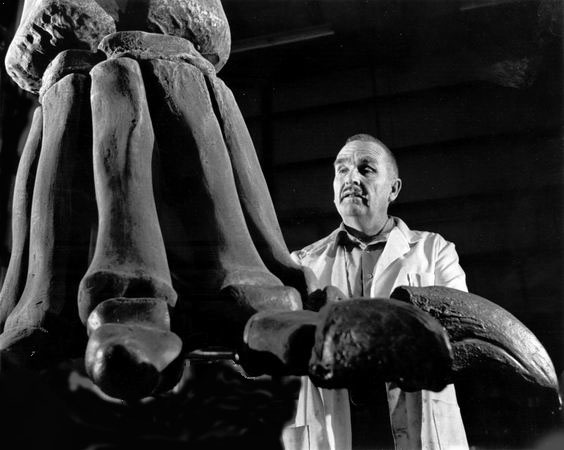
James A. Jensen in preparation lab at BYU with Ultrasaurus foot

James Alvin Jensen (August 2, 1918 – December 14, 1998), better known as "Dinosaur Jim", was an American paleontologist. His extensive collecting program at Brigham Young University in the Utah–Colorado region which spanned 23 years was comparable in terms of the number of specimens collected to that of Barnum Brown during the early 20th century. He was given the name "Dinosaur Jim" during the media coverage of his activities. Perhaps his most significant contribution to paleontology was to replace the 19th-century web of external metal struts, straps and posts that had been used to mount dinosaurs with a system of supports which were placed inside of bones, which produced free-standing skeletons with few or no obvious supports.

He is credited with naming and describing Supersaurus (1985) and Torvosaurus (with Peter Galton, 1979).

== Life to 1956 ==
=== Artist and sculptor ===
As an artist, he worked in most media. His pastel and acrylic paintings, reflecting his love of flowers, landscapes, and his appreciation of American Indians. His painting are hung from Alaska to Florida. In 1972, the Humble Oil Company listed him in a publication of artists of Alaska as one of the best-known pre-WWII artists. He sculpted in stone and metal, honing skills which were useful in developing a new system for mounting dinosaurs.

== Harvard University 1956 to 1961 ==
=== Kronosaurus queenslandicus ===
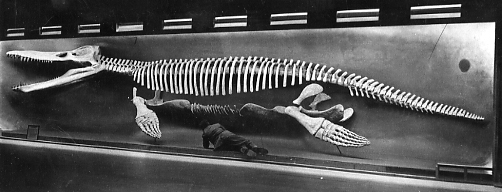
Kronosaurus queenslandicus before glass was added to exhibit. 1957–58

In 1956, Alfred Romer decided to mount a Kronosaurus queenslandicus skeleton and had to obtain an unusually large amount of money to do the job. This was because the weight of the final mount was estimated to exceed the carrying capacity of the floor on which it would rest, due to the large amount of steel that would be used in preparing the mount. Therefore, architects drafted plans for a large I-beam to span the entire width of the building. Then two large holes were opened in the external walls and permanent mounts were created on each wall to hold the beam. Cranes then raised and inserted the beam into the holes so that it spanned the entire floor and was then secured to the two mounts. Romer, Lewis and Jensen decided how to mount Kronosaurus. Jensen had plans showing how to mount a dinosaur without visible supports. Romer gave his approval to attempt a free standing mount. The plans were modified to suit the actual skeleton and Kronosaurus became the first mount done anywhere without visible structural members. All supporting bars, beams and sheets of metal and wood were integrated into or behind the bones. In addition to the unique method of concealing structural elements, Jensen used a curved back wall that had no corners to create the trompe d'oeil effect of a floating skeleton. There were no corners, vertical walls, or lines which would create the impression that the Kronosaurus was standing on the floor.

== Brigham Young University 1961 to 1984 ==
When he went to Brigham Young University, he helped develop the Paleontology program. He worked in the field every summer amassing a large collection of packaged bones in matrix. He continued to refine new mounting techniques, prepared specimens, describing some, and attempted unsuccessfully to obtain funding for an earth sciences museum. The bulk of his summer work was done in Western Colorado and Utah. In addition, he went on a second six-month expedition with Harvard University to Ischigualasto, Argentina, and went to Antarctica for three months in an expedition headed up by Ohio State University. His most significant finds in Argentina and Antarctica were the holotype of Probainognathus jenseni on Chañares Formation and a maxilla of a Lystrosaurus on Coalsack Bluff.

=== Dry Mesa Quarry ===
Starting in 1972, because of the remarkable range of species and number of specimens, he focused on Dry Mesa near Delta, in Western Colorado. He did work other locales, but the bulk of his collecting time was spent at Dry Mesa which is probably the richest dinosaur quarry discovered in North America in the second half of the 20th century.

In 1973, Brigham Young University cooperated with producer Steve Linton and director John Linton in order to produce The Great Dinosaur Discovery, a one-hour-long color documentary showing Jensen's on-site finds in Dry Mesa. First released on November 13, 1973, in local "Egyptian Theater" in Delta, and subsequently aired on several American TV channels, The Great Dinosaur Discovery was originally planned to be trimmed to about 30 minutes for educational use. Indeed, to obtain a shortened educational version, the full-length documentary was reduced to a 24-minute-long mini-film which started airing on American television channels throughout the US as of 1976.

=== New dinosaurs ===
Following is a list of new species that Jensen described. While the descriptions are sound, his publications reflected his lack of formal training, resulting in errors made in the assignment of sauropod material from Dry Mesa. Caveat all descriptions of Ultrasauros-Ultrasaurus-Supersaurus.

| Species | Discoverer | Invalid or Valid? |
|---|---|---|
| Cathetosaurus lewisi | Jensen, 1988 | Synonym Of Camarasaurus lewsi |
| Dystylosaurus edwini | Jensen, 1985 | Synonym Of Supersaurus |
| Hypsilophodon wielandi | Galton & Jensen, 1979 | Invalid, indeterminate basal ornithopod |
| Iguanodon ottingeri | Galton & Jensen, 1979 | Dubious |
| Palaeopteryx | Jensen, 1981 | Valid |
| Supersaurus vivianae | Jensen, 1985 | Valid |
| Torvosaurus tanneri | Galton & Jensen, 1979 | Valid |
| Ultrasauros | Jensen vide Olshevsky, 1991 | Synonym Of Supersaurus |
| Ultrasauros macintoshi | Jensen vide Olshevsky, 1991 | Synonym Of Supersaurus |

He did not describe all of the new species that were identified as they were collected. Additional new species will be described for Dry Mesa as they are worked out and studied at BYU.

=== Publications ===
Although he did not complete a formal education, Jensen starting publishing in the Alaska Sportsman in 1955, while working as a longshoreman in Seward, Alaska.

== Legacy ==
=== Free-standing mounts ===
The technique for mounting free-standing dinosaurs was developed by Jensen in 1957, while participating in the mount of Kronosaurus queenslandicus.

=== Plastic foam casting and other experiments ===
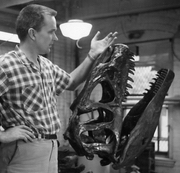
Allosaurus skull suspended on little finger

Because of Jensen's experience in manufacturing, he was aware of techniques, equipment and materials not generally used in museum displays. For example, in 1958, he pioneered the use of a novel industrial product, "rigid foam", for casting dinosaur bones as illustrated by the adjacent photo of an Allosaurus skull cast in foam. He worked at the time in the Department of Vertebrate Paleontology, Museum of Comparative Zoology, in the Peabody Museum at Harvard University. By experimenting with an Allosaurus skull he refined the technique and then published his findings in 1961.

=== Cooperation with rock hounds ===
As noted above, part of his success in finding specimens was due to his interest in "rock hounds" who jointly combed thousands of square miles of ground each year. He visited them every year or so, cultivating their friendship with gifts of dinosaur bones in return for information about their latest finds. In several instances, he named new dinosaurs after the person who led him to it.

=== Education ===
Another legacy was Jensen's interest in educating the public about dinosaurs. He enthusiastically educated the public by welcoming them into his quarries each summer. He received hundreds of letters from school children and answered them all. In spite of the fact that BYU denied Jensen a teaching role, he encouraged graduate students to take up the profession. Today, there is a small group of graduate students who became paleontologists as a result of his efforts.

=== BYU Museum of Paleontology ===
The BYU Museum of Paleontology was built around Jensen's collection.

== Ankle and foot versus feathers in arboreal life ==
Jensen collected "bird" bones in the Dry Mesa Quarry and became interested in the changes necessary for species to move from terrestrial to arboreal life. For him the sine qua non of arboreal life was not feathers. It was the ability of organisms to actually live in trees. This required that they be able to grasp branches, to build nests where they laid eggs and then reared young, and to sleep on small branches for many hours. Feathers do not confer these advantages to the foot or ankle. He studied ankles and feet of a wide range of mammals including a recently deceased elephant which was brought to him in a refrigerated railroad car, birds, amphibians and any creatures with leg bones and feet. His conclusion was that evolution of the ankle and foot was the fundamental change which had to occur so that species could move permanently, regardless of feathers or not, from the ground into the branches of trees. His research over several years on ankles and feet of various fossil and extant species supported this hypothesis. Ultimately he wrote an article discussing his hypothesis and findings and illustrated it with his own drawings of bones. But out of pique at the time at the world of paleontology, he had the article translated into Japanese and then published it in a Japanese science magazine.

== Honorary doctorate ==
In 1971, Jensen was granted an honorary doctorate by Brigham Young University.

== Selected works ==
- Jensen, James A. (1981) "A New Oldest Bird?" Anima: 33–39. Tokyo.
- Jensen, James A. (1985) "Uncompahgre dinosaur fauna: a preliminary report," Great Basin Naturalist, Vol 45, No 4
- Jensen James A. (2001) The Road to Chilecito, Launceston, Tasmania: Queen Victoria Museum and Art Gallery. ISBN 978-0-9586203-5-2, OCLC 49797079.
