= Geology of Zimbabwe =

Map of the Zimbabwe and Kaapvaal cratons

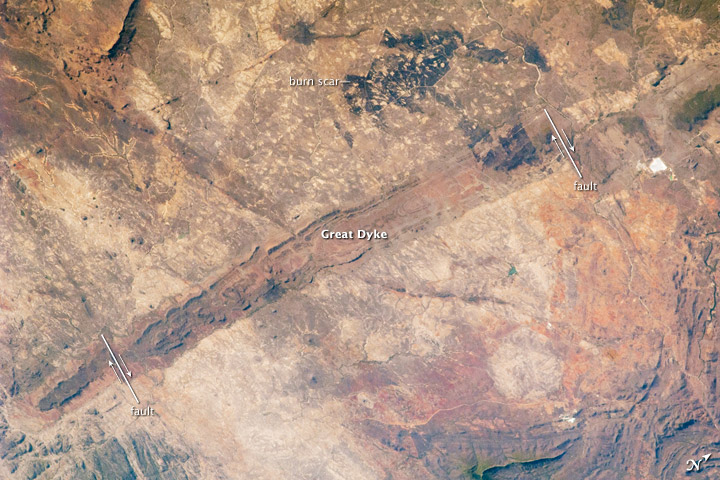
SW end of the 550 km long Great Dyke of Zimbabwe from ISS, 2010.

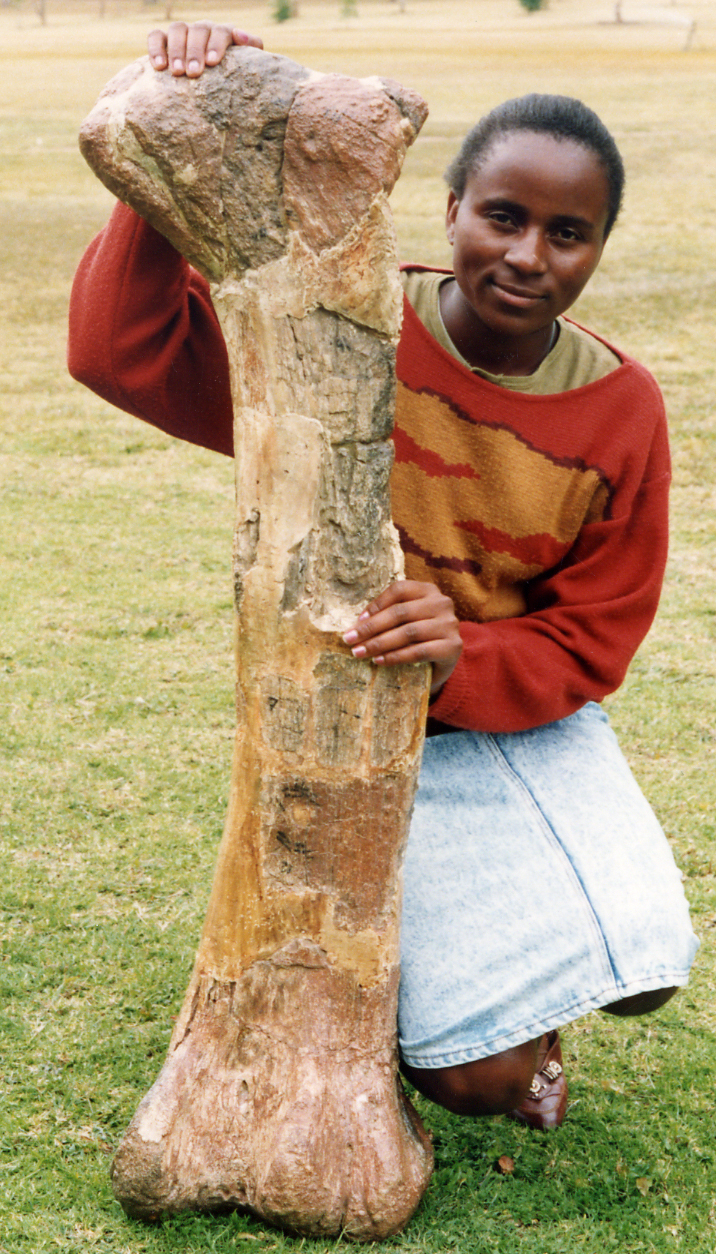
Brachiosaurus femur and Geologist Metrinah Ruzvidzo, 2005

The geology of Zimbabwe in southern Africa is centered on the Zimbabwe Craton, a core of Archean basement composed in the main of granitoids, schist and gneisses. It also incorporates greenstone belts comprising mafic, ultramafic and felsic volcanics which are associated with epiclastic sediments and iron formations. The craton is overlain in the north, northwest and east by Proterozoic and Phanerozoic sedimentary basins whilst to the northwest are the rocks of the Magondi Supergroup. Northwards is the Zambezi Belt and to the east the Mozambique Belt. South of the Zimbabwe Craton is the Kaapvaal craton separated from it by the Limpopo Mobile Belt, a zone of deformation and metamorphism reflecting geological events from Archean to Mesoproterozoic times. The Zimbabwe Craton is intruded by an elongate ultramafic/mafic igneous complex known as the Great Dyke which runs for more than 500 km along a SSW/NNE oriented graben. It consists of peridotites, pyroxenites, norites and bands of chromitite.

== Stratigraphy ==
=== Precambrian ===
The oldest supracrustal rocks are the Sebakwian Group (3.5 Ga) exposed around Shurugwi and Mashava, and northwest of Gweru, within the central craton. This group consist of metavolcanic rocks, including komatiite and basalt, banded iron formation, and clastic metasedimentary rocks. The Sebakwian Group is succeeded by the Bulawayan Group, further differentiated by the Lower Greenstones (2.9 Ga) and Upper Greenstones (2.7 Ga). The Lower Greenstones include felsic volcanic and volcaniclastic rocks, komatiites, and komatiitic basalts with interbedded iron-formations and polymict clastic sediments. Overlying the Bulawayan Group is the Shamvaian Group (2.7 Ga), and it is these two groups which constitute the main greenstone belts. The tonalitic Sesombi Suite and granitic Chilimanzi Suite granitoids intruded the Upper Greenstones and Shamvaian Group between 2.7 Ga to 2.6 Ga. The last major Archaen event was the intrusion of the Great Dyke (2.5 Ga).

By 1982, 123 mines had produced 155 tonnes of gold from the stratabound iron-formations of the Sebakwian, and Lower and Upper Greenstones. Of these mines, 31 had produced more than 311 kg, with the Wanderer Mine near Shurugwi producing the most at 36 tonnes. Non-stratabound gold production included 128 tonnes from the Que Que Ultramafic Complex within the Mashaba Ultramafic Suite of the Upper Greenstones, while the Upper Greenstone Basaltic and Bimodal Units had produced 400 and 161 tonnes respectively. Granitoid host rocks had produced a total of 132 tonnes of gold, and include the Rhodesdale Batholith at 53 tonnes, the Sesombi Suite at 36 tonnes, and the Penhalonga quartz diorite at 10 tonnes.

== Economic geology ==
Zimbabwe's mineral resources include, amongst others, coal, chromium ore, nickel, copper, iron ore, vanadium, tin, platinum group metals (such as palladium) and diamonds. Globally it is a significant producer of lithium, chrysotile asbestos and vermiculite. Gold, platinum group metals and chromium are Zimbabwe's key mineral resources. The Great Dyke provides most of Zimbabwe's chromium reserves. Zimbabwe experienced a decline in the mining of many minerals in the period to 2008 including the closure of several gold mines. However, diamond production increased making the country Africa's seventh largest producer by 2008.

The country has considerable coal reserves which are used in power generation. Its coal-bed methane field, the largest in southern Africa has not yet been exploited to the full.

== See also ==
- List of fossiliferous stratigraphic units in Zimbabwe
