= BYU Museum of Paleontology =

Science museum in Provo, Utah, United States

Coordinates: 40.2564°N 111.6570°W

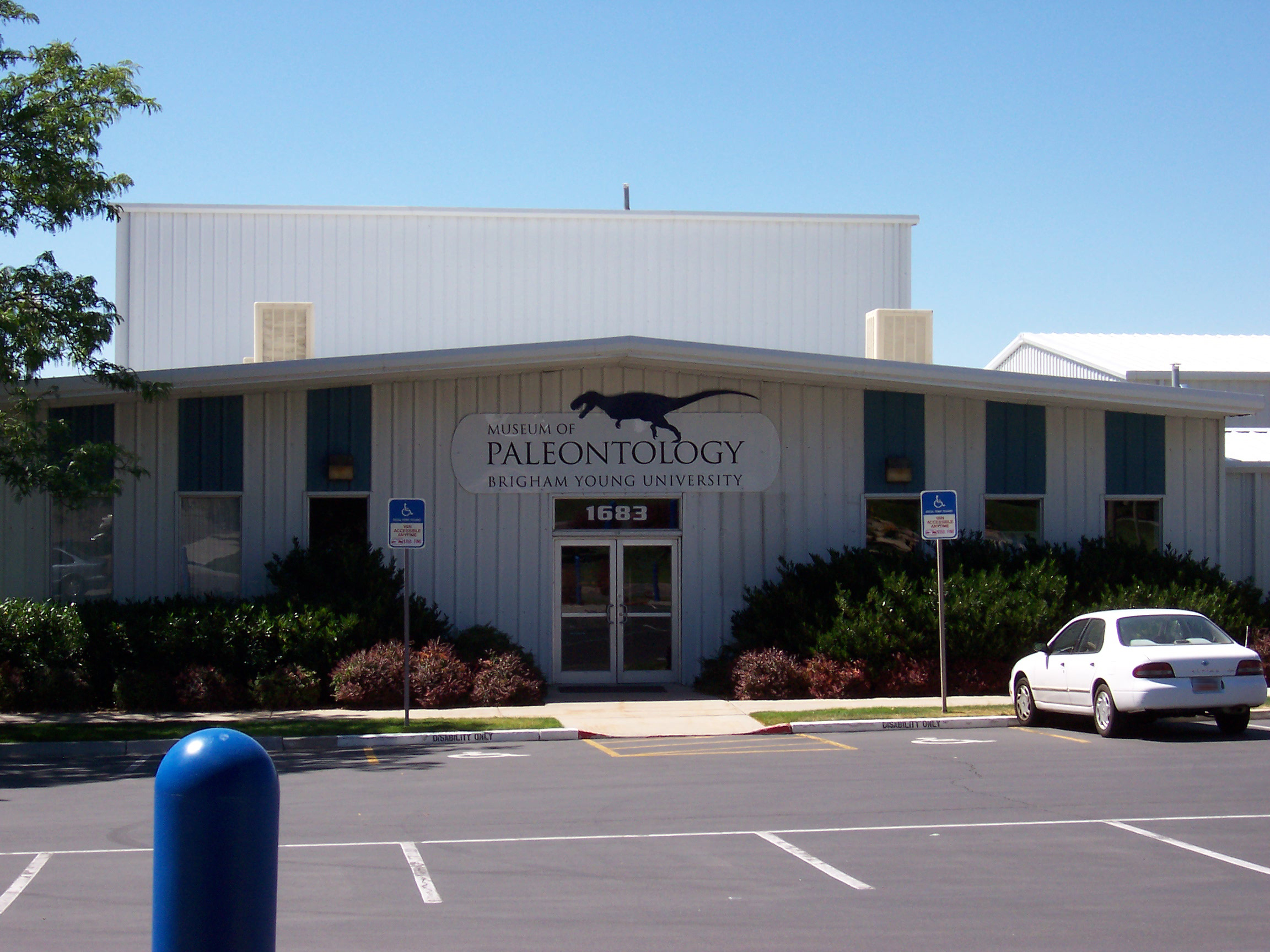
BYU Museum of Paleontology, August 2010

The Brigham Young University Museum of Paleontology was started in 1976 around the collection of James A. Jensen. For many years, it was known as the BYU Earth Science Museum, and most of the collection was in storage under the LaVell Edwards Stadium.

In October 2009, the museum held a grand opening of its new facilities during BYU homecoming week. With the 5,000-square-foot (460 m^{2}) addition, it now displays most of the collection. The change of name clarifies that the museum actually houses a large collection of dinosaur bones and other fossils.

The museum is currently directed by Rodney Scheetz, who was one of Jensen's students at BYU. Its main purpose is to facilitate research, but it is open to the public.

== Sources ==
- Swensen, Jason (May 16, 2009), "Dinosaurs revisited in BYU paleontology museum", Church News
- Museum Information, BYU Museum of Paleontology, Brigham Young University
- Geological Society of America brochure about the annual meeting at UVU which mentions plans for an excursion to the BYU Museum of Paleontology, including explanations of the museum's collection
