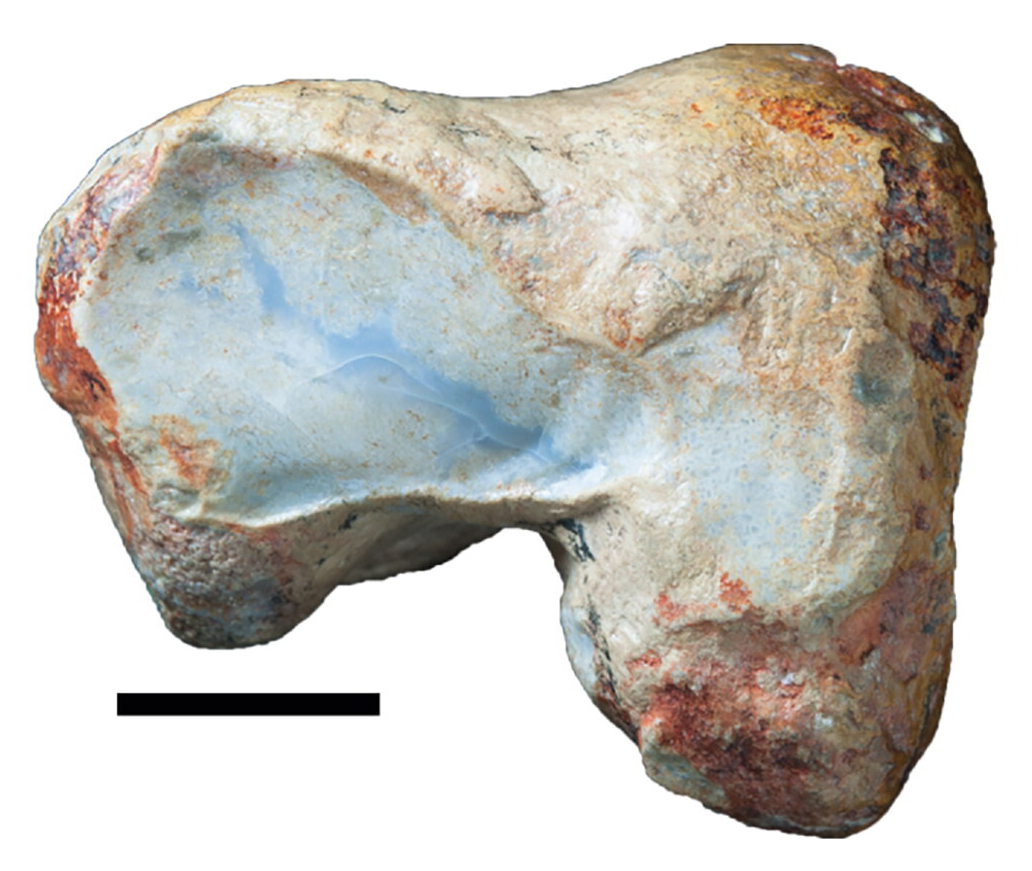
- Holotype femur fragment (specimen BMNH R.3719) shown from the bottom

Scientific classification
- Kingdom: Animalia
- Phylum: Chordata
- Class: Reptilia
- Clade: Dinosauria
- Clade: †Ornithischia
- Clade: †Neornithischia
- Genus: †Fulgurotherium von Huene, 1932
- Species: †F. australe

Binomial name
- †Fulgurotherium australe von Huene, 1932

= Fulgurotherium =

Fulgurotherium Temporal range: Early-mid Cenomanian ~99–96 Ma

Extinct genus of dinosaurs

Fulgurotherium (meaning "Lightning beast") is a dubious genus of ornithischian dinosaur from the Late Cretaceous (Cenomanian) Griman Creek Formation. It lived in what is now Australia.

== Discovery ==
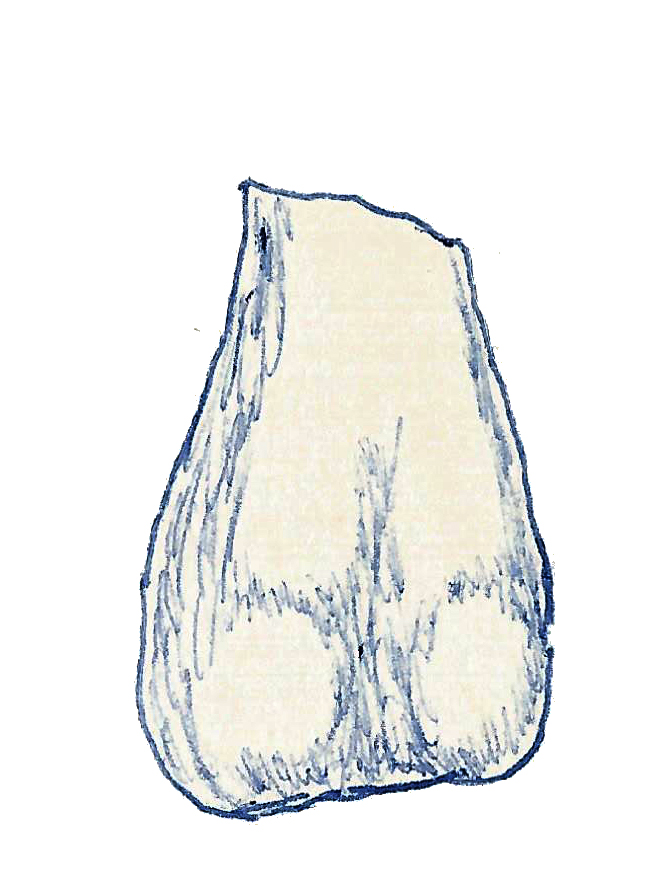
Drawing of the holotype shown from the side

The holotype of Fulgurotherium australe was first mentioned by British paleontologist Arthur Smith Woodward in 1909, along with several more fossils in the collection of the British Museum that had been collected from the Cenomanian Griman Creek Formation strata in Lightning Ridge in New South Wales, Australia. The type specimen (BMNH R.3719), an opalized anterior femur, was not fully described until in 1932, German paleontologist Friedrich von Huene named it Fulgurotherium australe as a coelurosaurian theropod related to Ornitholestes and Oviraptor.

The genus name is derived from Latin fulgur, "lightning", and Greek therion, "beast", a reference to the Lightning Ridge site in New South Wales. The specific name means "southern" in Latin. Its name is an unusual example of a name in which -therium was used for an animal which is not an extinct mammal.

He misidentified the fossil as part of the right metacarpal and due to this misidentification, believing it was one of the largest coelurosaurs then described, and later moved it to Ornithomimidae in 1944. It was not until 1986 that it was reidentified as the femur of a hypsilophodont related to Leaellynasaura and Nanosaurus, then Othnielia, by Molnar & Galton (1986). The two referred a total of seven femora to Fulgurotherium from Dinosaur Cove, though these femora were much smaller than the holotype, and Fulgurotherium was accepted as one of the four valid hypsilophodonts along with Leaellynasaura, "Victorian Hypsilophodont Type 1", & ,"Victorian Hypsilophodont Type 2". Rich & Vickers-Rich (1999) pointed out that the holotype was very worn and inadequate to be a type specimen, considering it a nomen dubium, a consensus that has been followed since.

== Description ==
Despite the holotype being dubious the holotype and many referred specimens of Fulgurotherium australe bear many characteristics seen in basal iguanodontians like Gasparinisaura and Notohypsilophodon. These traits include an anterior distal intercondylar fossa on the tibial condyle, that although present, is very weakly developed. The holotype measures 7 centimeters in length and 4.5 cm at its widest transverse point, one of the largest basal ornithischian femora recovered from Australia.

== Classification ==
Agnolin et al (2010) found it to be an indeterminate iguanodontian, but a 2019 redescription of Talenkauen found it to be an elasmarian.

- Clypeodonta
  - Hypsilophodon
  - - Elasmaria
      - Fulgurotherium
      - Trinisaura
      - Gasparinisaura
      - Qantassaurus
      - Notohypsilophodon
      - Morrosaurus
      - Kangnasaurus
      - Anabisetia
      - Atlascopcosaurus
      - Macrogryphosaurus
      - Talenkauen
    - Dryomorpha

== See also ==
- List of Australian and Antarctic dinosaurs
