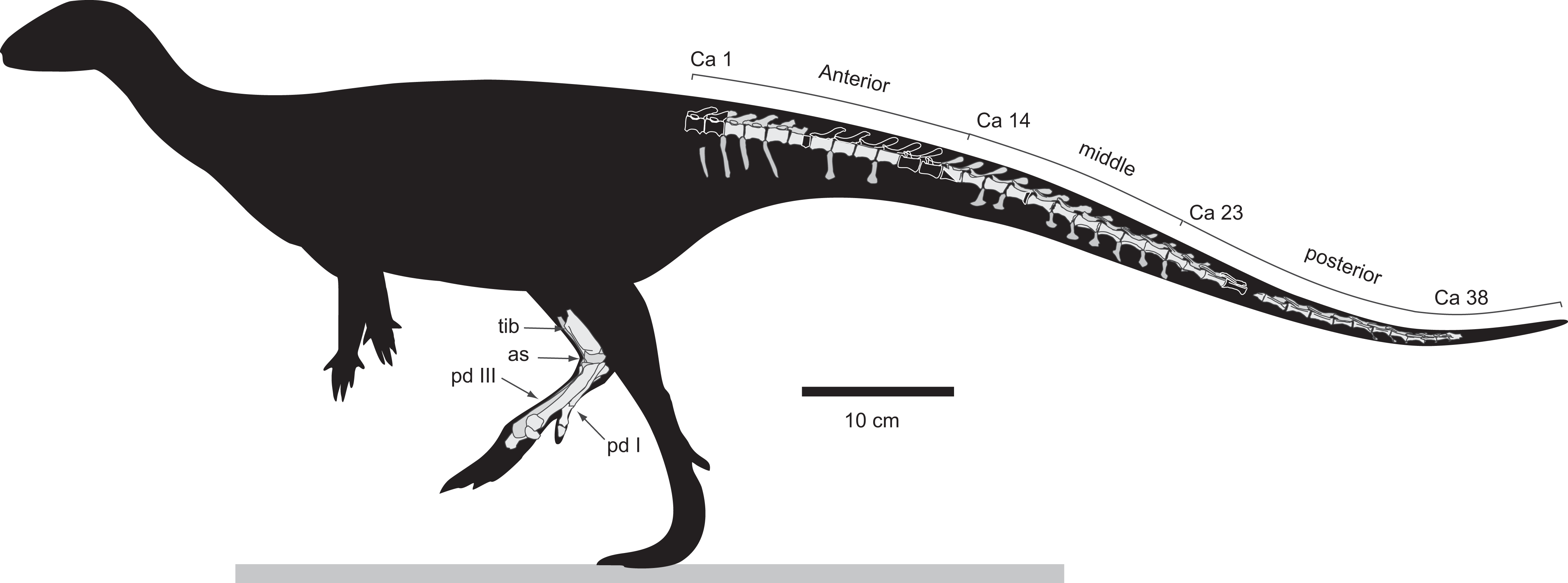
- Annotated skeletal reconstruction

Scientific classification
- Kingdom: Animalia
- Phylum: Chordata
- Class: Reptilia
- Clade: Dinosauria
- Clade: †Ornithischia
- Clade: †Ornithopoda
- Clade: †Elasmaria
- Genus: †Diluvicursor; Herne et al., 2018

Type species
- †Diluvicursor pickeringi Herne et al., 2018

= Diluvicursor =

Diluvicursor Temporal range: Albian ~113–112 Ma

Extinct genus of dinosaurs

Diluvicursor ("flood runner") is a genus of small ornithischian from the Lower Albian (Early Cretaceous) of Australia. It is known from one species, the type species D. pickeringi. The two known specimens, a vertebra and a partial juvenile postcranium discovered in 2005 from the Eumeralla Formation, are known, and they were named in early 2018.

== Discovery and naming ==
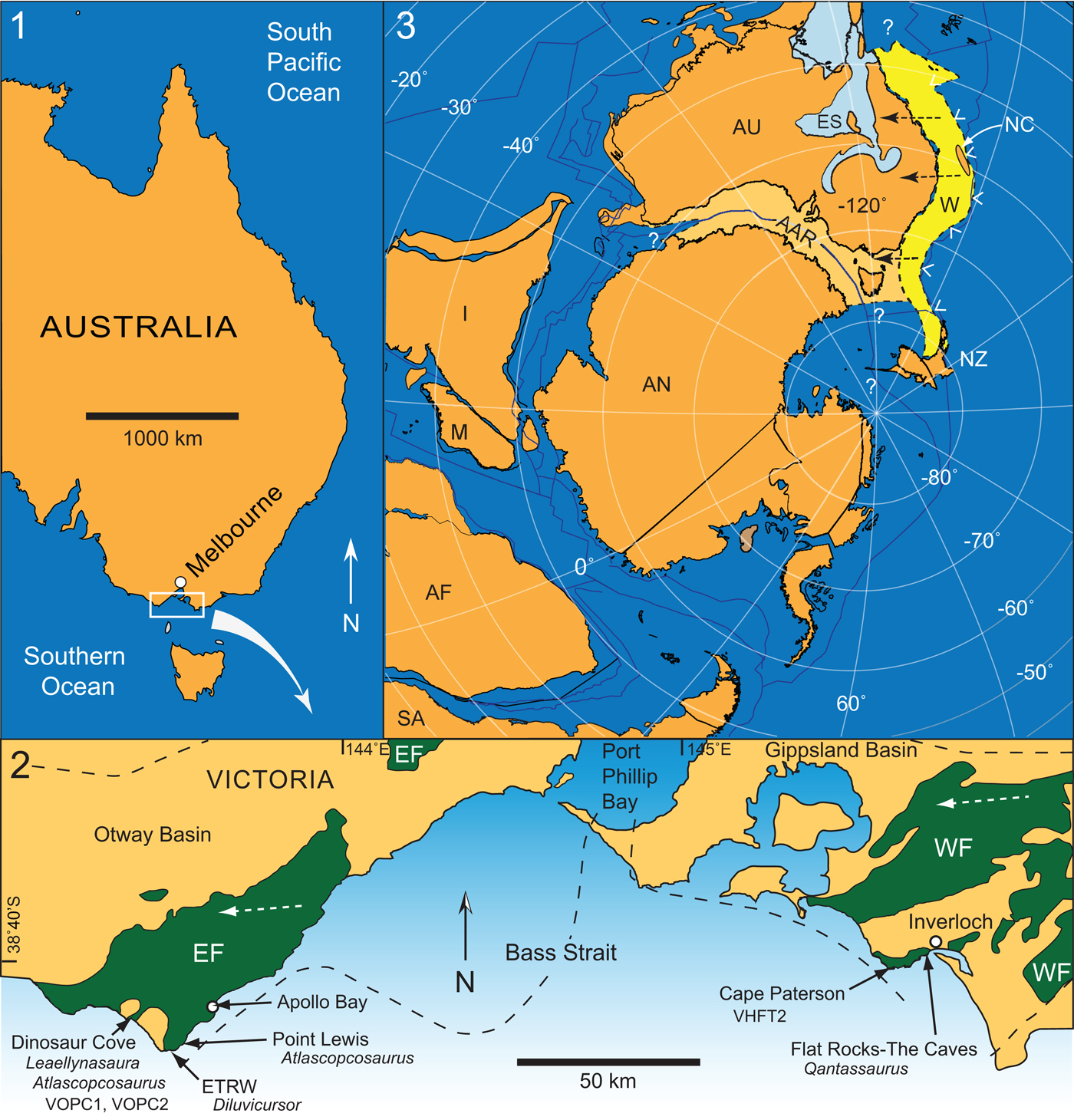
Map showing the location of the Eumeralla Formation, EF in 2, Diluvicursor type locality, and the geography of Australia in the Early Cretaceous

The remains of Diluvicursor were discovered in 2005 in the Eumeralla Formation, dating from the early Albian, in Victoria, southeastern Australia at the beach of Cape Otway near the extensively excavated Dinosaur Cove, a location where the remains of several other ornithischians had been previously discovered, alongside remains of other species. The then new locality was named the "Eric the Red West Sandstone" (ETRW). The find was reported in the scientific literature by Thomas Rich et al., in 2009, in a study about remains from ETRW referred to the mammal Bishops. The authors tentatively it referred to Ornithopoda. The vertebra of a spinosaurid, NMV P221081, was also found at the site. In a 2013 review of ornithopods from Victoria, it was given a diagnosis and preliminary description.

The specimens were described and named online, through use of ZooBank registration, in January 2018, in a study in which the sedimentology, taphonomy, palaeoecology, and stratigraphy of the site were also investigated. The generic name of the taxon is derived from the Latin diluvi~, meaning "flood" or "deluge", which was chosen in reference to the fact that the type specimen was deposited in a high energy river and the species would have lived in a prehistoric floodplain, and the Latin word cursor, which means "runner". The specific name, pickeringi, is honoring David A. Pickering, who had made notable contributions to palaeontology in Australia, and who died at the time of the preparation of the study.

The holotype, NMV P221080, consists of an almost complete articulated tail lacking only the first, second and twelfth tail vertebra, and parts of the lower right leg: the lower end of the shinbone and calfbone, the complete ankle bones, the metatarsus, the first toe and the first phalanges of the second, third and fourth toes. This specimen is preserved on a stone plate, separated into five blocks. It would have been deposited in a deep and high-energy river, the carcass thought to have been caught in a trap of plant debris on a standing tree stump. It represents a juvenile individual. Specimen NMV P229456, a partial tail vertebra of a larger individual, found nearby in the same deposit, was referred to the taxon.

== Description ==
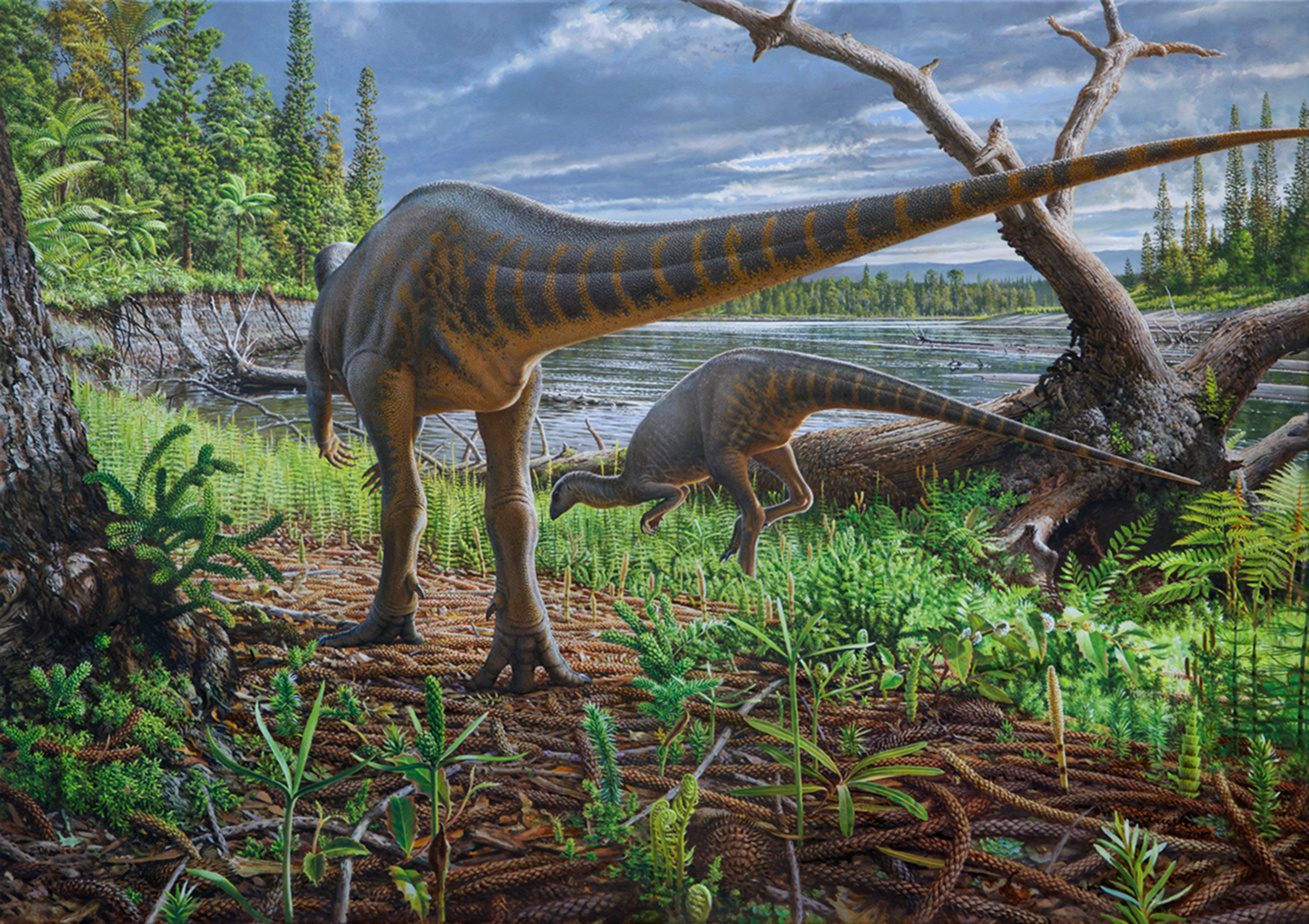
Speculative life restoration of Diluvicursor in its environment

The holotype individual, thought to be an older juvenile, was estimated to be 1.2 metres (3.9 ft) in length, using the proportions of Hypsilophodon to fill in unknown areas; it has been compared to the size of a modern wild turkey. It was noted, however, that the tail being preserved in a curled fashion made exact tail length uncertain, owing to difficulty in measuring intervertebral space; the size estimate is therefore uncertain. Based on an isolated caudal vertebra, NMV P229456, twice the length of vertebrae from the holotype, adults are estimated to have measured at least 2.3 metres (7.5 ft) long, closer to the size of a rhea, and still small for an ornithopod. The taxon was noted in Herne's PhD thesis as being distinctly more robust than other assumed relatives from the area. Ten autapomorphies, unique traits, were identified in the holotype. Its diet possibly consisted of flowers, seeds, fruit, pine nuts, mosses, and lichens.

== Phylogeny ==
In their 2025 description of a small partial ornithopod hindlimb from the Australian Griman Creek Formation, Bell and colleagues included the specimen in a phylogenetic analysis modified from the dataset of Fonseca et al. (2024). Their results recovered Diluvicursor as a basal elasmarian, as the sister taxon to Anabisetia. These results are displayed in the cladogram below:

Size comparison

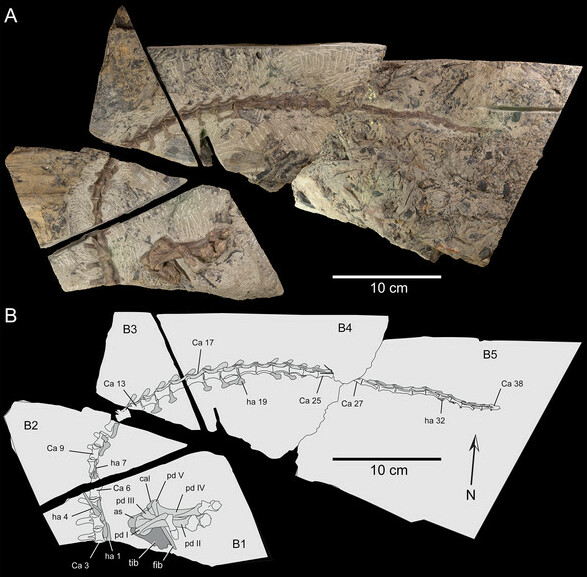
The type specimen, preserving a partial tail and hindlimb

- Elasmaria
  - Iyuku raathi
  - - Weewarrasaurus pobeni
    - - Kangnasaurus coetzeei
      - - - Anabisetia saldiviai
          - Diluvicursor pickeringi
        - - - Gasparinisaura cincosaltensis
            - Notohypsilophodon comodorensis
          - - - Morrosaurus antarcticus
              - - AM F127930 (Griman Creek Fm. taxon)
                - Isasicursor santacrucensis
            - - - Trinisaura santamartaensis
                - - Fostoria dhimbangunmal
                  - Muttaburrasaurus langdoni
              - - Mahuidacursor lipanglef
                - - Talenkauen santacrucensis
                  - - Sektensaurus sanjuanboscoi
                    - Macrogryphosaurus gondwanicus

At least three other small-bodied ornithopods are also known from the Eumeralla Formation: Atlascopcosaurus, Galleonosaurus, and Leaellynasaura. These are all definitively known only from craniodental material, meaning that there is no anatomical overlap between them and Diluvicursor, which is known only from postcrania. As such, it is possible that Diluvicursor may be synonymous with any of these other genera, though this is impossible to determine without additional specimens with overlapping material.

== See also ==
- 2018 in paleontology
