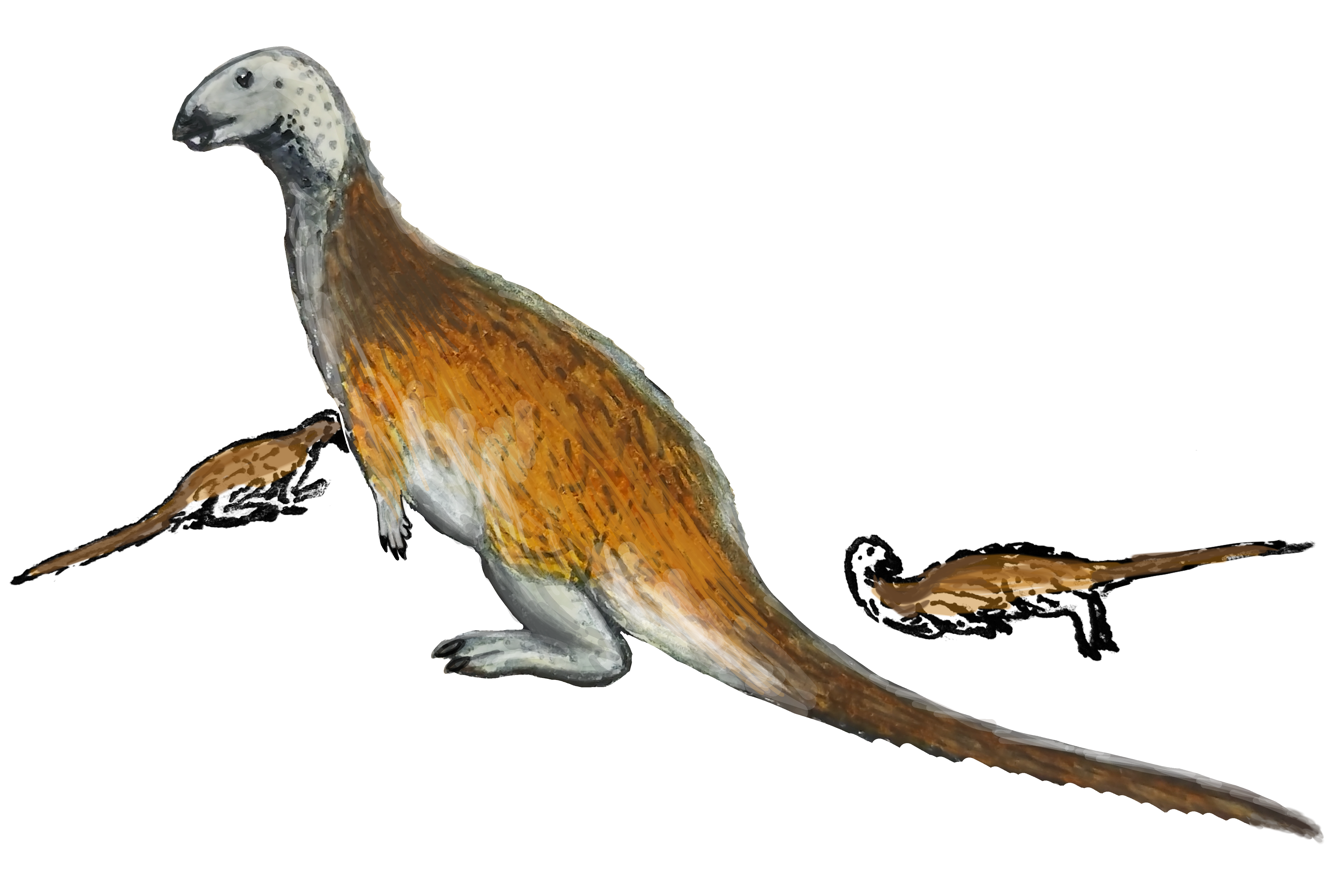
- Life restoration of an adult Chakisaurus along with two juvenile individuals

Scientific classification
- Kingdom: Animalia
- Phylum: Chordata
- Class: Reptilia
- Clade: Dinosauria
- Clade: †Ornithischia
- Clade: †Ornithopoda
- Clade: †Elasmaria
- Genus: †Chakisaurus
- Species: †C. nekul

Binomial name
- †Chakisaurus nekul Alvarez Nogueira et al., 2024

= Chakisaurus =

Chakisaurus Temporal range: Early Cretaceous (Albian), 106.2 Ma

Extinct genus of ornithopod dinosaurs

Chakisaurus (meaning "elder guanaco lizard") is an extinct genus of elasmarian ornithopod dinosaur from the Early Cretaceous Huincul Formation of Argentina. The genus contains a single species, C. nekul, known from multiple partial skeletons belonging to individuals of different ages. Chakisaurus represents the first ornithischian species to be named from the Huincul Formation.

== Discovery and naming ==
Chakisaurus type locality at Pueblo Blanco Natural Reserve, Argentina

The Chakisaurus fossil material was discovered in sediments of the Huincul Formation in Pueblo Blanco Natural Reserve (previously known as the Violante Farm locality) near Ezequiel Ramos-Mexía Lake in Río Negro Province, Argentina. The holotype specimen, MPCA Pv 816, consists of several partial dorsal vertebrae, a partial sacrum, twelve caudal vertebrae, an incomplete haemal arch, partial left femur and fibula, partial right tibia and calcaneus, and two toe bones from the fourth digit. Three additional paratype specimens were also assigned to Chakisaurus, found in a group about 500 metres (1,600 ft). The first is MPCA Pv 822, which belongs to a juvenile individual, including five dorsal vertebral centra, a left humerus, and the bottoms of both femora. The second is MPCA Pv 823, another juvenile individual consisting of the top of a right ulna. The third is MPCA Pv 813, which includes eight dorsal vertebral centra, two partial ribs, two partial haemal arches, the bottom of a right radius, a toe bone of digit four, and a toe claw of digit two or four. An additional cervical vertebra (possibly the fourth), MPCN Pv 846, was also referred to Chakisaurus.

In 2024, Alvarez Nogueira et al. described Chakisaurus nekul as a new genus and species of ornithopod based on these fossil remains. The generic name, "Chakisaurus", combines "Chaki", an Aonikenk word meaning "elder guanaco"—, referring to the species Lama guanicoe—with the Greek "σαῦρος" ("sauros"), meaning "lizard". The specific name, "nekul", is a Mapudungun word meaning "swift".

Chakisaurus represents the tenth basal ornithopod named from South America. However, it is only the first ornithischian from the Huincul Formation to receive a scientific name.

== Description ==
Life restoration

Chakisaurus has been described as a "medium-sized" elasmarian ornithopod, similar in size to taxa such as Anabisetia, Notohypsilophodon and Trinisaura, but smaller than taxa such as Talenkauen, Mahuidacursor, and Isasicursor. Analysis of the forelimb bones preserved for the species finds no adaptations towards some level of quadrupedal locomotion, suggesting that some other elasmarians developed these traits independently.

When the anterior caudal vertebrae were articulated, this likely resulted in a protonic posture, with the base of the tail curving downward. This feature has only otherwise been observed in titanosaurs, including the aeolosaurin Arrudatitan. Like other elasmarians, the tail shares similar adaptations towards cursoriality as with some coelurosaur theropods.

== Classification ==
In their phylogenetic analyses, Alvarez Nogueira et al. (2024) recovered Chakisaurus as an elasmarian ornithopod within the iguanodontian clade Dryomorpha. They note that due to the fragmentary nature of the Chakisaurus fossil material, their tree was not well-defined. Their results are shown in the cladogram below:

- - Tenontosaurus spp.
  - Iguanodontia
    - - Muttaburrasaurus
      - - Foskeia ('Vegagete ornithopod')
        - Fostoria
        - Rhabdodontidae
    - Dryomorpha
      - - - Dryosaurus
          - - Valdosaurus
            - Dysalotosaurus
        - - Camptosaurus aphanoecetes (Uteodon)
          - - Iguanodon bernissartensis
            - Camptosaurus dispar
      - - Eousdryosaurus
        - Elasmaria
          - Talenkauen
          - - Chakisaurus
            - Morrosaurus
            - Mahuidacursor
            - Macrogryphosaurus
            - Kangnasaurus
            - Anabisetia

== Palaeoenvironment ==
Size of several dinosaurs from the Huincul Formation compared to a human

Chakisaurus is known from the Early Cretaceous Huincul Formation of Río Negro Province, Argentina. Many saurischian dinosaurs, including rebbachisaurids (Cathartesaura, Limaysaurus, and Sidersaura), titanosaurs (Argentinosaurus, Bustingorrytitan, Chucarosaurus, and Choconsaurus), carcharodontosaurids (Mapusaurus, Meraxes, and Taurovenator), a megaraptoran (Aoniraptor), abelisaurids (Skorpiovenator, Tralkasaurus, and Ilokelesia), an elaphrosaurine (Huinculsaurus), a paravian (Overoraptor), and the unusual avetheropod Gualicho have also been named from the formation. Remains of an unnamed unenlagiid have also been reported. The non-dinosaurian fauna includes fossil fish, sphenodonts, indeterminate squamates, chelid turtles, and eusuchian crocodilians.
