= Rich (surname) =

Rich is a surname. Notable people with this name include:

== A–L ==
- Adam Rich (1968–2023), American actor
- Adrienne Rich (1929–2012), American poet
- Buddy Rich (1917–1987), American jazz drummer and bandleader
- Charlie Rich (1932–1995), American country music singer-songwriter and musician
- Christopher Rich (theatre manager) (1657–1714), English producer and theatre manager
- Claudius James Rich (1787–1821), British orientalist
- Craig Rich (1938–2024), British broadcaster and meteorologist
- Daniel Rich (born 1990), Australian rules footballer
- Darrell Keith Rich (1955–2000), Native American serial killer
- Denis Rich (born 1954), Australian rules football umpire
- Frank Rich (born 1949), American writer
- Frederick Henry Rich (1824–1904), British soldier and Railway official
- George Rich (1863–1956), Australian lawyer and High Court judge
- Georgina Rich (born 1976), British actor
- Gladys Rich (1892–1972), American composer
- Heather Rich, Oklahoma high school student murder victim
- Helen Rich (1827–1915), American writer
- Henry Rich, 1st Earl of Holland (1590–1649), English courtier and soldier
- Sir Henry Rich, 1st Baronet (1803–1869), British politician
- Henry Bayard Rich (1849–1884), British soldier
- Herb Rich (1928–2008), American 2x All-Pro football player
- Hugo Rich (aka Olaf Dietrich) (born 1952), Australian criminal (Dietrich v The Queen)
- Irene Rich (1891–1988), American actress
- Jodee Rich (born 1960), Australian businessman
- Joel Rich (1824–1906), Wisconsin state senator
- John Rich (born 1974), American musician
- John Rich (producer) (1692–1761), English producer and theatre manager
- John T. Rich (1841–1926), American politician
- Katherine Rich (born 1967), New Zealand politician
- Lillian Rich (1900–1954), British-born American silent film actress

== M–Z ==
- Marc Rich (aka Marc David Reich) (1934–2013), American businessman
- Martin Rich (1905–2000), German conductor
- Matty Rich (born 1971), American film director and screenwriter
- Michael Rich (cyclist) (born 1969), German cyclist
- Michael D. Rich, American executive
- Mike Rich (born 1959), American screenwriter
- Nathan Rich (born 1982), American Scientology critic and content creator
- Patricia Vickers-Rich (born 1944), Australian palaeontologist
- Patrick Rich, English rugby league player
- Paul Rich (1921–2000), English singer and music publisher
- Ralph M. Rich (1916–1942), American aviator
- Randy Rich (born 1953), American football player
- Richard Rich, 1st Baron Rich (1496–1567), Lord Chancellor
- Richard Rich (director), American animated film director
- Richie Rich (rapper) (aka Richard Serrel) (born 1967), American rapper
- DJ Richie Rich (born 1969), British disc jockey
- Rishi Rich (aka Rishpal Rekhi), British Asian music producer
- Robert Rich (musician) (born 1963), American ambient music composer
- Robert Rich (1905–1976), pen name used by American screenwriter and novelist Dalton Trumbo
- Robert Rich, 2nd Earl of Warwick (1587–1658), British naval officer and politician
- Sir Robert Rich, 4th Baronet (1685–1768), British field marshal
- Robert E. Rich Sr. (1913–2006), American food-processing pioneer
- Ruby Sophia Rich (1888–1988), Australian women's rights advocate
- Seth Rich, American political murder victim of 2016
- Sharon Rich (born 1953), American biographer
- Stephen Gottheil Rich (1890–1958), philatelist of New Jersey
- Thomas Rich (disambiguation)

- Sir Thomas Rich, 1st Baronet (1601–1667), English politician
- Sir Thomas Rich, 5th Baronet (c.1733–1803), British naval officer and politician
- Thomas Rich (American politician) (1830–1899), English-born American politician in Iowa
- Thomas F. Rich, known as Ösel Tendzin (1943–1990), American-born teacher of Tibetan Buddhism
- Tommy Rich (aka Thomas Richardson, born 1956), American professional wrestler
- Tom Rich (born 1941), Australian paleontologist

- William Rich (disambiguation), several people

- Sir William Rich, 2nd Baronet, (c. 1654–1711), MP
- Sir William Rich, 4th Baronet (c. 1702–1762), see Rich baronets
- William Rich (botanist) (1800–1864), American botanist and explorer

== See also ==
- Rich family
- Rich baronets
