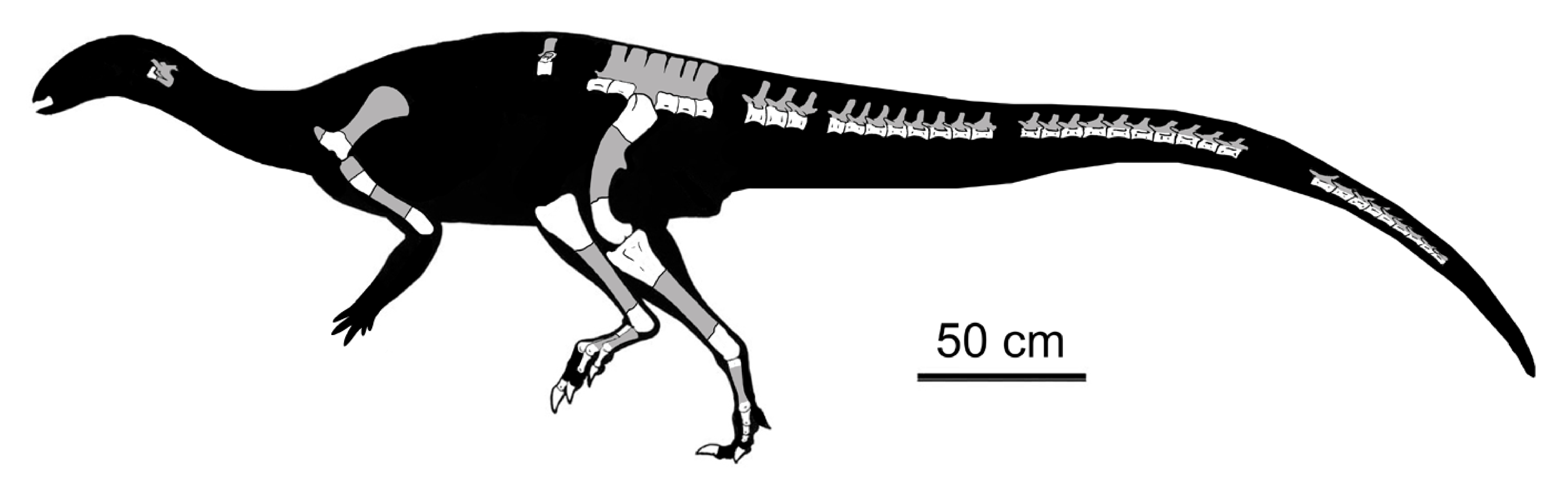
- Skeletal reconstruction of Isasicursor

Scientific classification
- Kingdom: Animalia
- Phylum: Chordata
- Class: Reptilia
- Clade: Dinosauria
- Clade: †Ornithischia
- Clade: †Ornithopoda
- Clade: †Elasmaria
- Genus: †Isasicursor; Novas et al., 2019

Type species
- †Isasicursor santacrucensis Novas et al., 2019

= Isasicursor =

Isasicursor Temporal range: Late Cretaceous, Campanian–Maastrichtian

Extinct genus of elasmarian dinosaurs

Isasicursor (meaning "Isasi's runner" after Marcelo Pablo Isasi) is an extinct genus of elasmarian ornithopod dinosaurs known from the Late Cretaceous Chorrillo Formation of Santa Cruz Province, Argentina. The genus contains a single species, Isasicursor santacrucensis. It was a contemporary of the titanosaur sauropod Nullotitan, which was described in the same paper.

== Discovery and naming ==
In 1980, geologist Francisco E. Nullo noticed the presence of sauropod bones on a hillside of the Estancia Alta Vista, south of the Centinela River in the Santa Cruz province of Argentina. He reported these finds to then-prominent paleontologist José Bonaparte. Bonaparte dug up a large sauropod cervical vertebra in 1981. The old site was relocated and new excavations were carried out between 13 and 17 January and 14 to 19 March 2019, and a new site was discovered on the Estancia La Anita. A new fauna came to light in an area of 2,000 square kilometres (770 square miles). The sauropod finds were named as the new genus Nullotitan, but bones from a new ornithopod were also discovered by technician Marcelo Pablo Isasi, which laid close to some mosasaur teeth.

In 2019, the type species Isasicursor santacrucensis was named and described by Fernando Emilio Novas and colleagues. The genus name, Isasicursor, honors Isasi and connects this with the Latin word cursor, meaning "runner". The specific name, santacrucensis, refers to its discovery in Santa Cruz province.

The holotype specimen, MPM 21525, was found in a layer of the upper Chorrillo Formation that dates from the Maastrichtian. It consists of the upper side of the left shin bone. Different bones from the same location were designated as paratypes. These include MPM 21526, a partial cervical vertebra; MPM 21527: two dorsal vertebrae; MPM 21528: a sacrum missing the third sacral vertebra; MPM 21529: thirty anterior, middle and posterior vertebrae of different individuals; MPM 21530: the bottom of a right scapula; MPM 21531: the lower end of a left humerus; MPM 21532: the main body of a left pubis; MPM 21533: the upper part of a right femur, three upper and lower left femora, and two femur shafts from immature individuals; MPM 21534: the lower end of a tibia; MPM 21535: the end of a second metatarsal; MPM 21536: the lower end of a third left metatarsal; MPM 21537: the end of a fourth metatarsal; MPM 21538: the fourth metatarsal bone of a young individual; MPM 21539: several toe bones; MPM 21540: six foot claws; and MPM 21541: the second and third toes of a young individual.

The finds represent at least four individuals. They are found in a rock layer 5 metres (16 ft) long and 0.5 metres (1.6 ft) thick. The fossils are part of the collection of the Museo Regional Padre Molina.

== Description ==
Size compared to a human

=== Size and distinctive features ===
The describers were able to identify five distinctive features or autapomorphies (unique derived characters). The sacrum is curved downwards. The first and second sacral vertebrae are connected via a pin-and-hole connection. The cnemial crest of the tibia is thickened and projected forward. The lateral condyle of the tibia has an additional anterolateral process. The second metatarsal has a ligament pit that is proximally displaced.

=== Skeleton ===
The cervical vertebra is keeled and flattened on the side. The sacrum has six sacral vertebrae and is fairly robust. The bottom surface is arched when seen from the side. The keeled first sacral vertebra is greatly widened sideways. The second sacral vertebra has a keel that extends into a protrusion that fits into a hole in the anterior facet of the first vertebra; their contact is flat. The fourth vertebra has a longitudinal trough on the underside with only a low ledge at the front. The front facet is square, the back facet hexagonal. The fifth vertebra has the same morphology at the bottom. It is oval on the front but rectangular on the back. The sixth vertebra also articulates with a pin in the fifth. The tail vertebrae are slightly amphicoelous with pronounced haemal facets. Lateral ridges increase towards the back, so that eventually a hexagonal cross-section is created.

With the shoulder blade, the cavity above the shoulder joint is round and shallow, as with Gasparinisaura and Trinisaura. The forelimb is relatively long but shorter than the hindlimb. The humerus bends outwards, a characteristic of elasmarians.

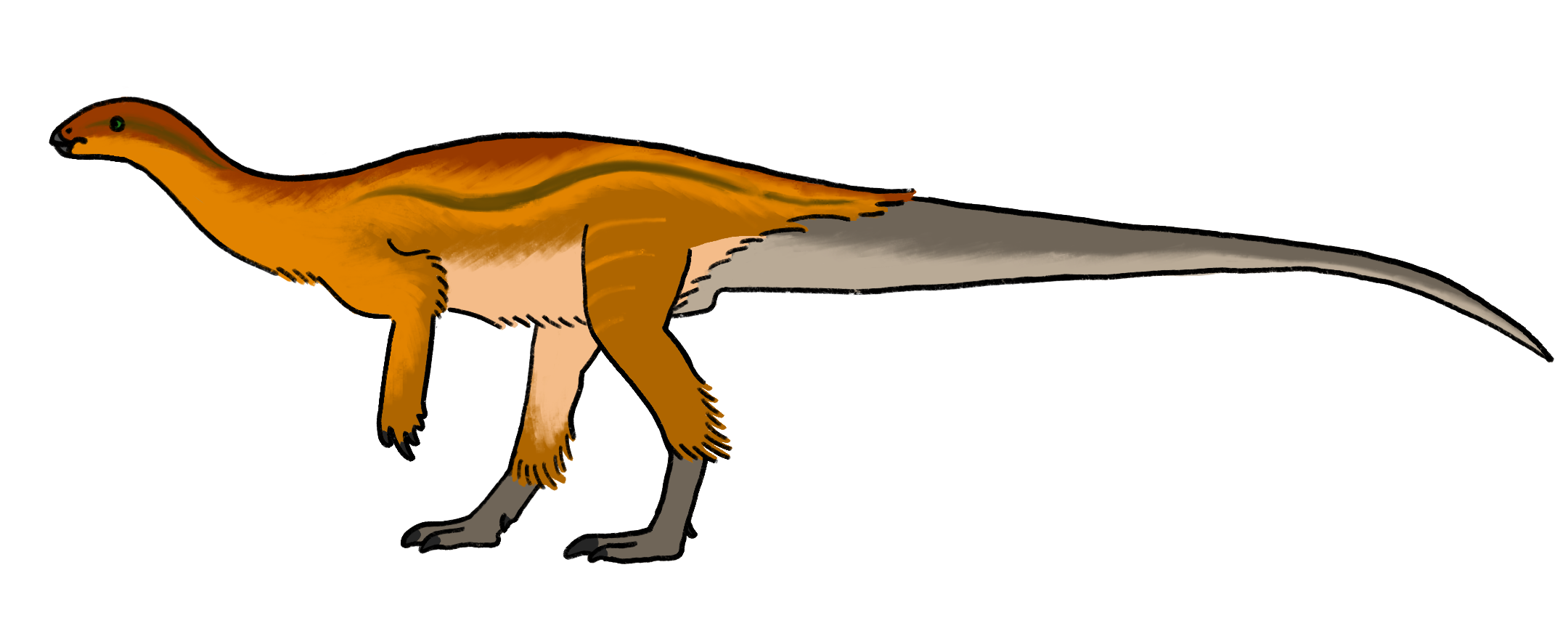
Life reconstruction of Isasicursor

The pubis did not touch the obturator process of the ischium, meaning that the obturator foramen was open posteriorly. For the femur, the greater trochanter is convex at the top and separated by a groove from the front lesser trochanter on the inside. The front groove is not well developed between the lower condyles. The inner condyle is not expanded outwards. With the tibia, the upward widening of the cnemial crest above the joint surface gives it a triangular profile. This comb is also thickened across, with a round top. The crista lateralisis also thick, with a straight front edge. The triangular outer lobe of the upper surface has a special obliquely forward projection. The lower outer leg style has an elongated comb that forms an elevation in the middle. The inner post is not bent forward. In the younger individuals, all these characteristics are less pronounced on the lower part of the tibia.

The second metatarsal is flattened at the top and thickened from front to back, a synapomorphy of the Elasmaria. However, the thickening remains limited. With the third metatarsal, the innermost lower joint bump is the largest. With the remarkably robust fourth metatarsal, the upper outer edge forms a sharp ledge; in Talenkauen, Morrosaurus and the Styracosterna this piece is completed. The bottom surface forms a parallelogram whose rear edge protrudes more inwards but is curled outwards. The pedal phalanges are sturdy and short. The foot claws are not hoof-shaped but sharp with a flat bottom.

== Classification ==
Novas and colleagues (2019) placed Isasicursor in the Elasmaria, although without a phylogenetic analysis, so its exact relationships were unclear. If this placement is correct, it would be the youngest known iguanodont, and by extension, ornithopod, known from the Southern Hemisphere.

In their 2025 description of a small partial ornithopod hindlimb from the Australian Griman Creek Formation, Bell and colleagues included the specimen in a phylogenetic analysis modified from the dataset of Fonseca et al. (2024). Their results recovered the Australian specimen as the sister taxon to Isasicursor within the Elasmaria, in a clade also including Morrosaurus, known from Antarctica. The clade of the Griman Creek Fm. taxon (AM F127930) and Isasicursor is supported by the absence of an anterior groove between the condyles on the bottom part of the femur. These results are displayed in the cladogram below:

- Elasmaria
  - Iyuku raathi
  - - Weewarrasaurus pobeni
    - - Kangnasaurus coetzeei
      - - - Anabisetia saldiviai
          - Diluvicursor pickeringi
        - - - Gasparinisaura cincosaltensis
            - Notohypsilophodon comodorensis
          - - - Morrosaurus antarcticus
              - - AM F127930 (Griman Creek Fm. taxon)
                - Isasicursor santacrucensis
            - - - Trinisaura santamartaensis
                - - Fostoria dhimbangunmal
                  - Muttaburrasaurus langdoni
              - - Mahuidacursor lipanglef
                - - Talenkauen santacrucensis
                  - - Sektensaurus sanjuanboscoi
                    - Macrogryphosaurus gondwanicus

== Palaeobiology ==
Dinosaurs named from the Chorrillo Formation (Isasicursor in light green, left)

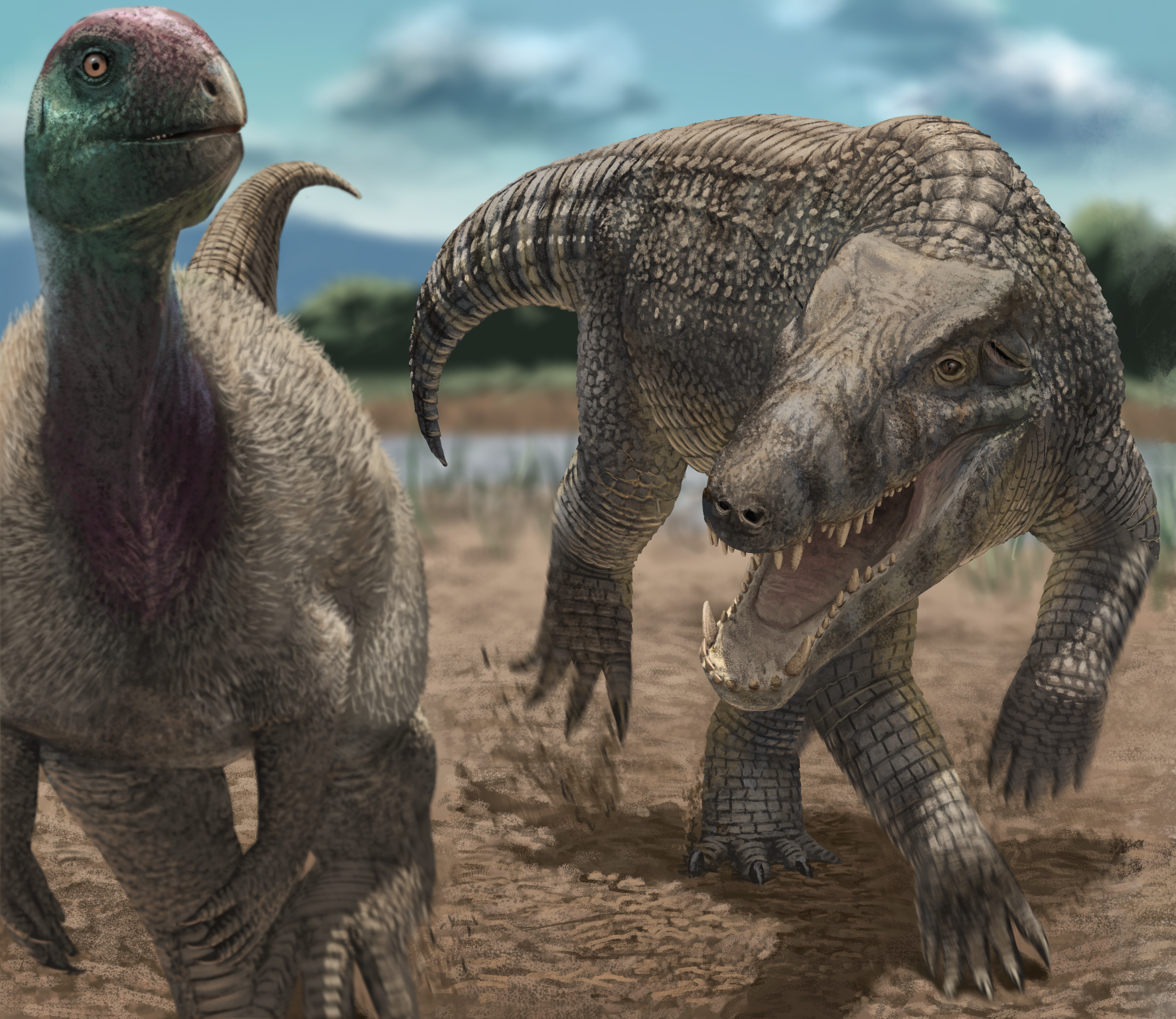
Speculative life restoration of Isasicursor being chased by the contemporary carnivorous notosuchian Kostensuchus

Isasicursor was a herbivore. Novas et al. (2019) considered it likely that the Elasmaria lived together with the relatively larger Hadrosauroidea, with the two groups occupying different niches, though hadrosauroids have not been described from the site. The presence of the titanosaur Nullotitan suggests niche partitioning with giant sauropods. Isasicursor was probably hunted by the megaraptorid theropod Maip or the peirosaurid notosuchian Kostensuchus

Novas et al. interpreted the remains of young and old individuals being found together as evidence that Isasicursor may have lived in herds.
