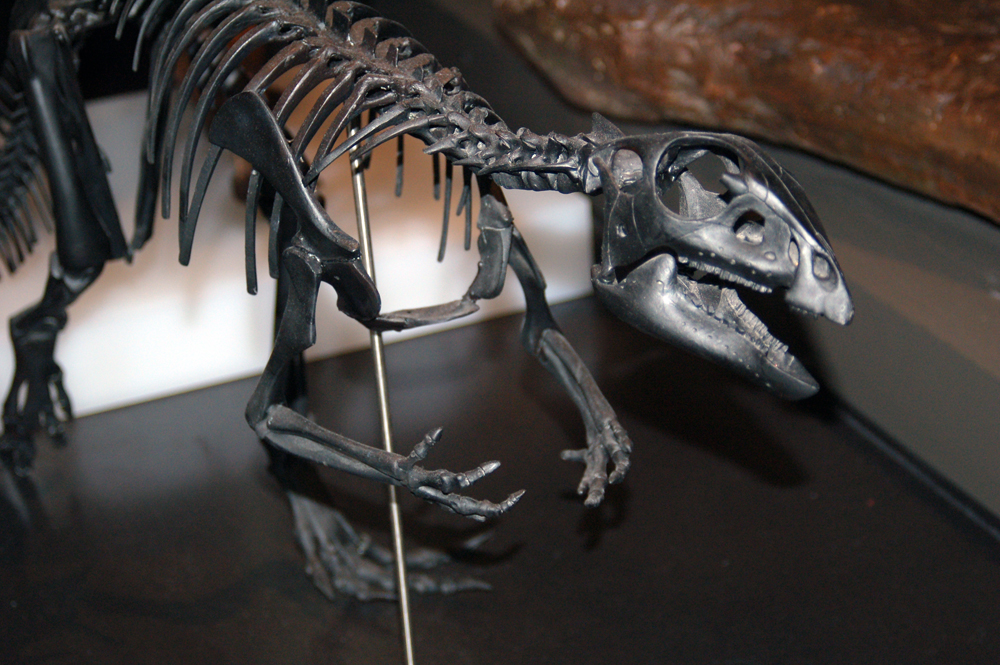
- Skeletal reconstruction of Qantassaurus intrepidus at the Australian Museum, Sydney

Scientific classification
- Kingdom: Animalia
- Phylum: Chordata
- Class: Reptilia
- Clade: Dinosauria
- Clade: †Ornithischia
- Clade: †Ornithopoda
- Clade: †Elasmaria
- Genus: †Qantassaurus; Rich & Vickers-Rich, 1999
- Species: †Q. intrepidus

Binomial name
- †Qantassaurus intrepidus Rich & Vickers-Rich, 1999

= Qantassaurus =

Qantassaurus Temporal range: Early Cretaceous, 125–112 Ma

Extinct genus of dinosaurs

Qantassaurus (/ˌkwɑːntəˈsɔːrəs/ KWAHN-tə-SOR-əs) is a genus of basal two-legged, plant-eating elasmarian ornithischian dinosaur that lived in Australia about 125-112 million years ago, when the continent was still partly south of the Antarctic Circle. It was described by Patricia Vickers-Rich and her husband Tom Rich in 1999 after a find near Inverloch, and named after Qantas, the Australian airline.

== Description ==
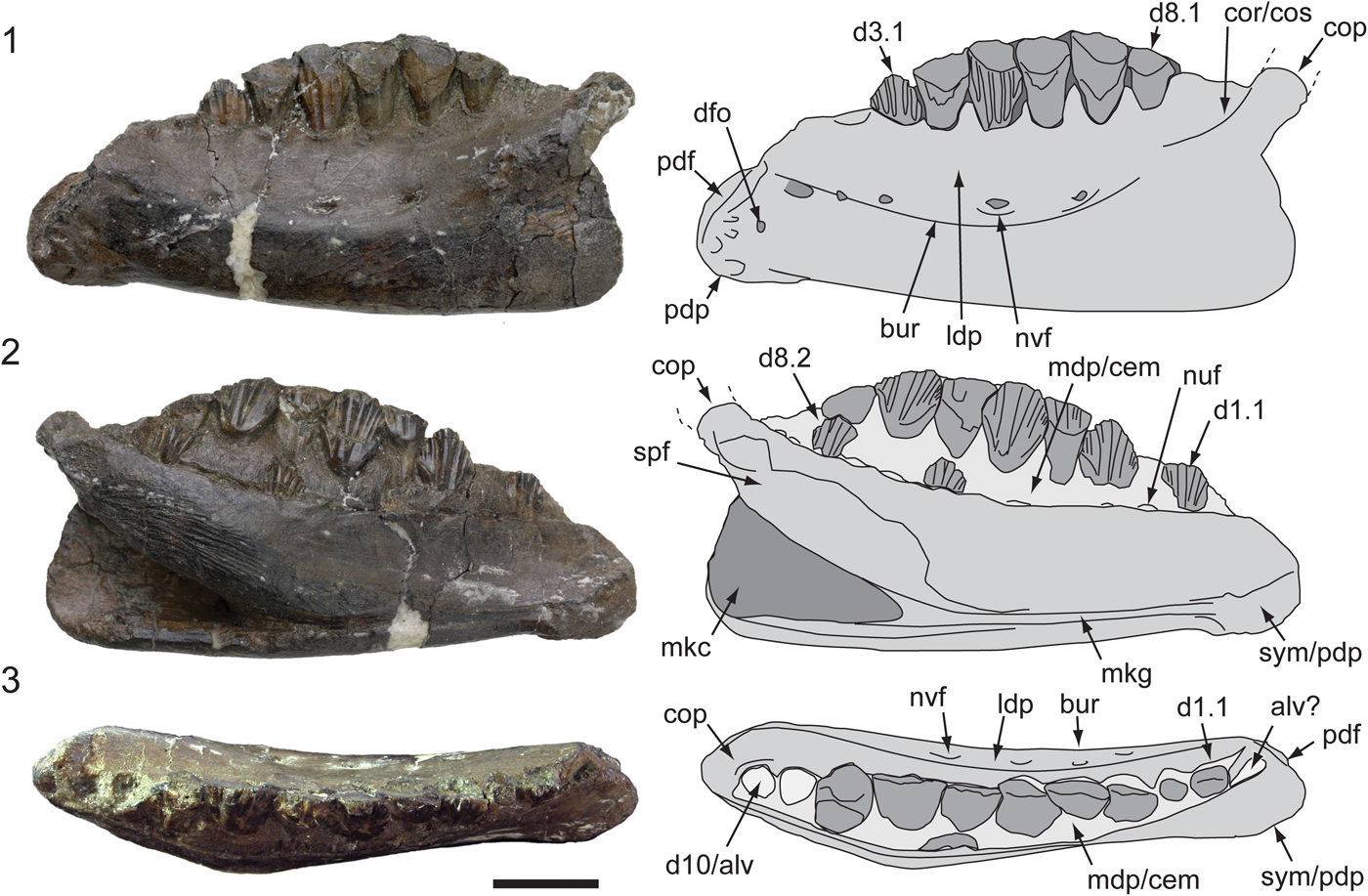
Holotype dentary of Qantassaurus at multiple angles.

Qantassaurus was probably about 1.8 meters (6 feet) long, and about one meter (3 feet) high. If it resembled its relatives, it had short thighs and long shins, and probably was a fast runner. Its feet had claws for traction, and a long tail probably helped with turning, stiffened by ossified tendons. One characteristic of the "Polar Victorian" euornithopods are distinctive spurs, or trochanters, on the upper surface of the thigh bone (or femur), where muscle was attached.

Qantassaurus is only known from jaw fragments. These are foreshortened compared to related species so its face was probably short and stocky. It had ten teeth in each lower jaw. It probably had a beak, and possessed leaf-shaped teeth back in its cheek, which were shed as they wore down, and replaced by new teeth growing up from the jaw. The teeth had eight distinctive vertical ridges on the outer side with a single larger primary ridge in the centre. Like its close relative Leaellynasaura, its diet consisted of plants like ferns and horsetails.

Qantassaurus lived 127.2-125 million years ago in Australia, during the late Barremian age of the early Cretaceous period. At the time, Australia was part of the supercontinent of Gondwana, and partly within the Antarctic Circle, although the significance of polar conditions during the warm Cretaceous were greatly different from conditions in this region today. The average temperature of the region is contentious, with estimates ranging from -6 to well over 5 °C (21 to 37 °F). Conditions were likely to be at their coldest during the polar nights, which lasted up to three months.

One interpretation of the fossil material is that small ornithopods had adaptations to survive cooler conditions. Bone growth of presumed related taxa shows they were active all year round, so they did not hibernate through the winter. The structure of these bones also suggests warm-bloodedness, which would help maintain its body heat.

== Classification ==
Size of Qantassaurus (in green) compared to other Australian ornithischians

Qantassaurus is a basal iguanodont ornithopod that was originally assigned to the Hypsilophodontidae in 1999. Today, this is understood to be an unnatural (paraphyletic) group, and Qantassaurus was recently recovered as a basal iguanodont by Boyd (2015), and more specifically as a member of the iguanodontian clade Elasmaria by Rozadilla et al. (2016) and Madzia et al. (2017).

In this regard, it is one of four ornithischian species once considered hypsilophodontids from southeast Australia, along with Leaellynasaura amicagraphica, Atlascopcosaurus loadsi, and Fulgurotherium australe. The four taxa are mostly known from isolated bones and teeth; however the thigh bones of F. australe are very diverse and may belong to three genera.

== History ==
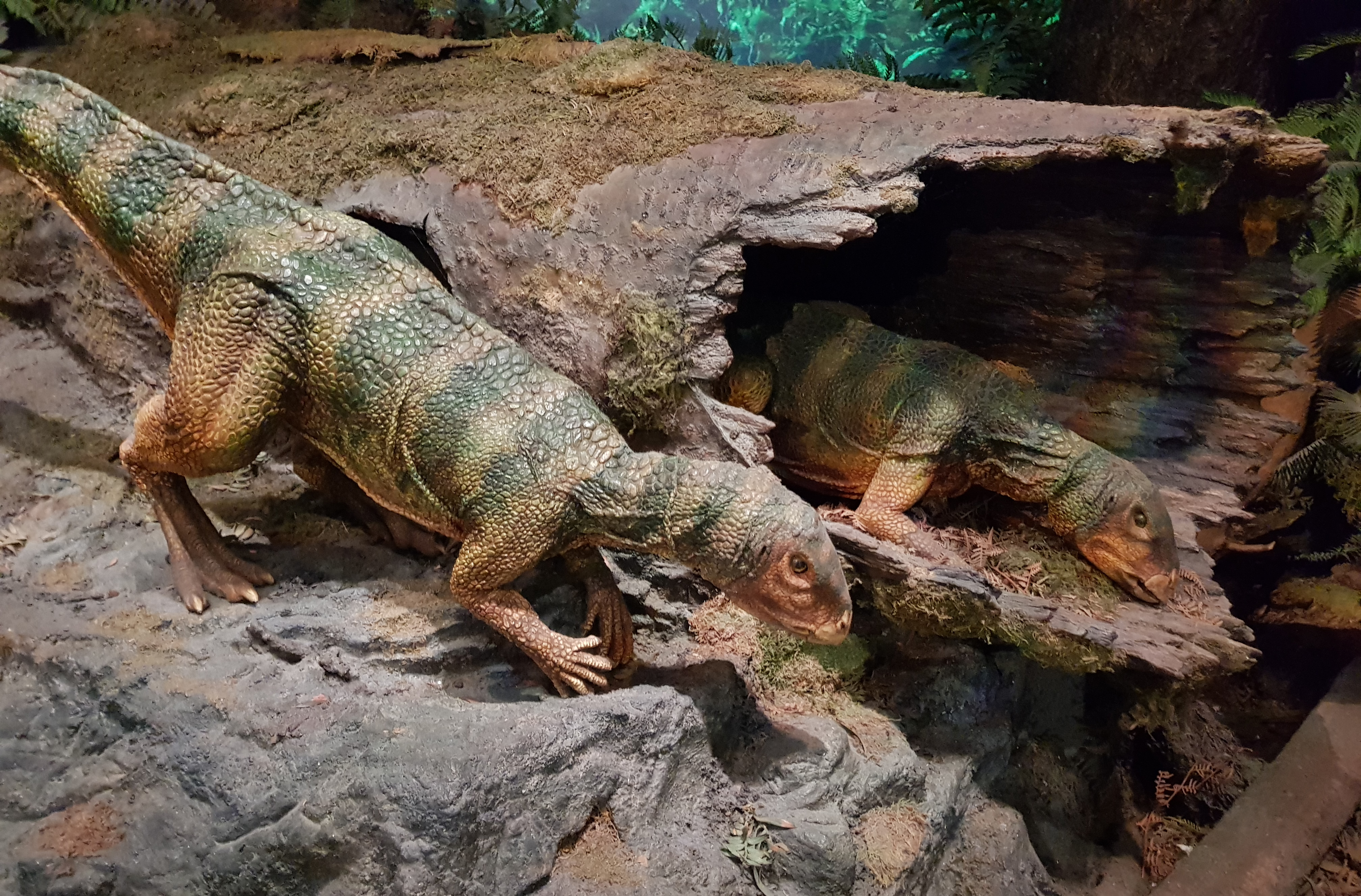
Model of Qantassaurus at the Melbourne Museum

The holotype of Qantassaurus was discovered on 27 February 1996, during the third annual field season of the Dinosaur Dreaming project, a dig jointly run by Monash University and the National Museum of Victoria. The dig occurred on the beach of the Bunurong Marine Park at the intertidal site known as Flat Rocks, near Inverloch, in southeastern Victoria, Australia. The rock outcrops at this site are part of the Wonthaggi Formation of the Strzelecki Group, which during the Barremian stage were deposited in floodplains with braided river channels. The holotype specimen, NMV P199075, a fifty-six millimetres long single left dentary of the lower jaw, containing ten teeth (three unerupted), was found by Nicole Evered, a long time participant of the dig. Two other jaws, specimens NMV P198962, a left dentary, and NMV P199087, a right dentary, found at the same site the same year have also been tentatively associated with, or referred to, the species.

It was named Qantassaurus intrepidus by Patricia Vickers-Rich and Tom Rich in 1999, in honor of the Qantas, which shipped fossils around the country as part of the Great Russian Dinosaurs Exhibit between 1993 and 1996, and sponsored expeditions to South America and Eastern Europe. Qantas is an acronym, which is why a u does not follow the q in Qantassaurus. The specific name means "intrepid" in Latin, referring to the climatic challenges the small dinosaur had to face.

== See also ==
- Qantas (Australian airline)
