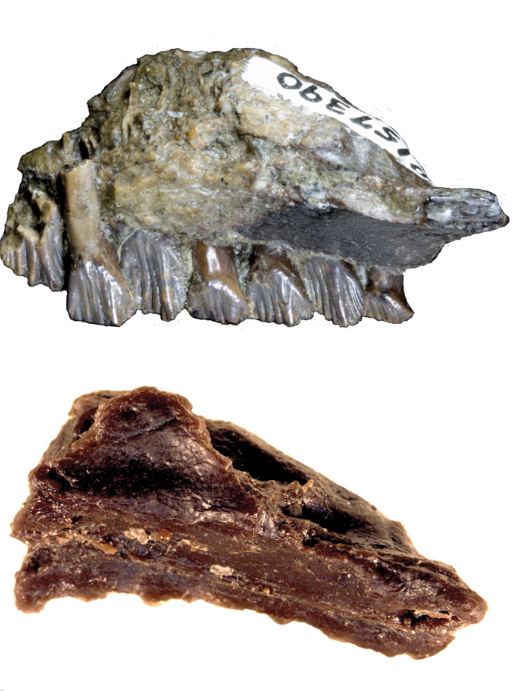
- NMV P157390, a referred maxilla of A. loadsi (top), and NMV P166409, a cast of the holotype maxilla of A. loadsi (bottom)

Scientific classification
- Kingdom: Animalia
- Phylum: Chordata
- Class: Reptilia
- Clade: Dinosauria
- Clade: †Ornithischia
- Clade: †Ornithopoda
- Genus: †Atlascopcosaurus; Rich & Vickers-Rich, 1989
- Species: †A. loadsi

Binomial name
- †Atlascopcosaurus loadsi Rich & Vickers-Rich, 1989

= Atlascopcosaurus =

Atlascopcosaurus Temporal range: Early Cretaceous ~114 Ma

Extinct genus of dinosaurs

Atlascopcosaurus (/ˌætləsˌkɒpkəˈsɔːrəs/) is a genus of herbivorous basal iguanodont dinosaur from the Early Cretaceous Eumeralla Formation of Australia.

== Discovery and naming ==
The type specimen, NMV P166409, was found in 1984 at the Dinosaur Cove East site on the coast of Victoria, in layers of the Eumeralla Formation dating from the early Cretaceous, Aptian-Albian. The holotype consists of a piece of the upper jaw, a partial maxilla with teeth, and referred specimens include teeth, another maxilla, and dentaries. Although the rest of the skeleton is unknown it can be inferred from closely related species that the genus represents a small bipedal herbivore.

The type species, Atlascopcosaurus loadsi, was named and described by Tom Rich and Patricia Vickers-Rich in 1989. The generic name refers to the Atlas Copco Company which had provided equipment for the dig that discovered this dinosaur in 1984. The project revealed 85 fossil bone fragments of various species. This opened the door for more excavation and, along with other companies, Atlas Copco helped over ten years excavate about sixty metres of tunnel in a cliff wall at the sea shore. The specific name, loadsi, honours William Loads, the state manager for Atlas Copco at the time, who assisted during the dig.

== Description ==
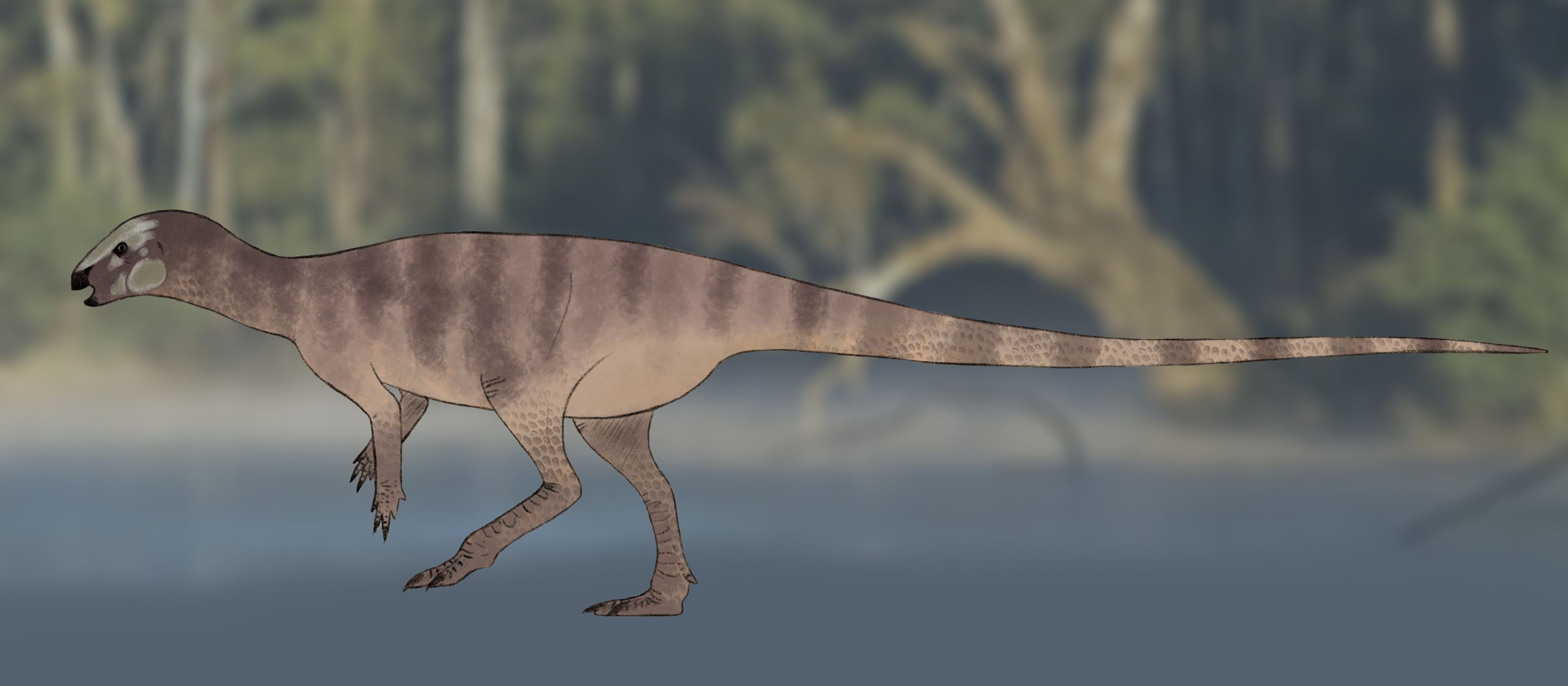
Reconstruction

By extrapolation it has been estimated that Atlascopcosaurus loadsi was about two to three metres (6.5–10 ft) long and weighed approximately 125 kg.

== Classification ==
Despite being assigned to Hypsilophodontidae by its describers, the original classification of Atlascoposaurus was considered untenable given that Hypsilophodontidae has been recovered as paraphyletic in subsequent cladistic studies and Atlascopcosaurus was tabulated as a basal member of Ornithopoda in the second edition of the Dinosauria. Because the teeth are not species-specific and the maxilla fragment is little informative, Agnolin et al. (2010) treated it as a nomen dubium, even though they noted similarities with the elasmarians Anabisetia and Gasparinisaura from Patagonia. However, Boyd (2015) considered the genus valid and recovered it at the base of Iguanodontia in a clade with Anabisetia, Gasparinisaura, and Qantassaurus.
