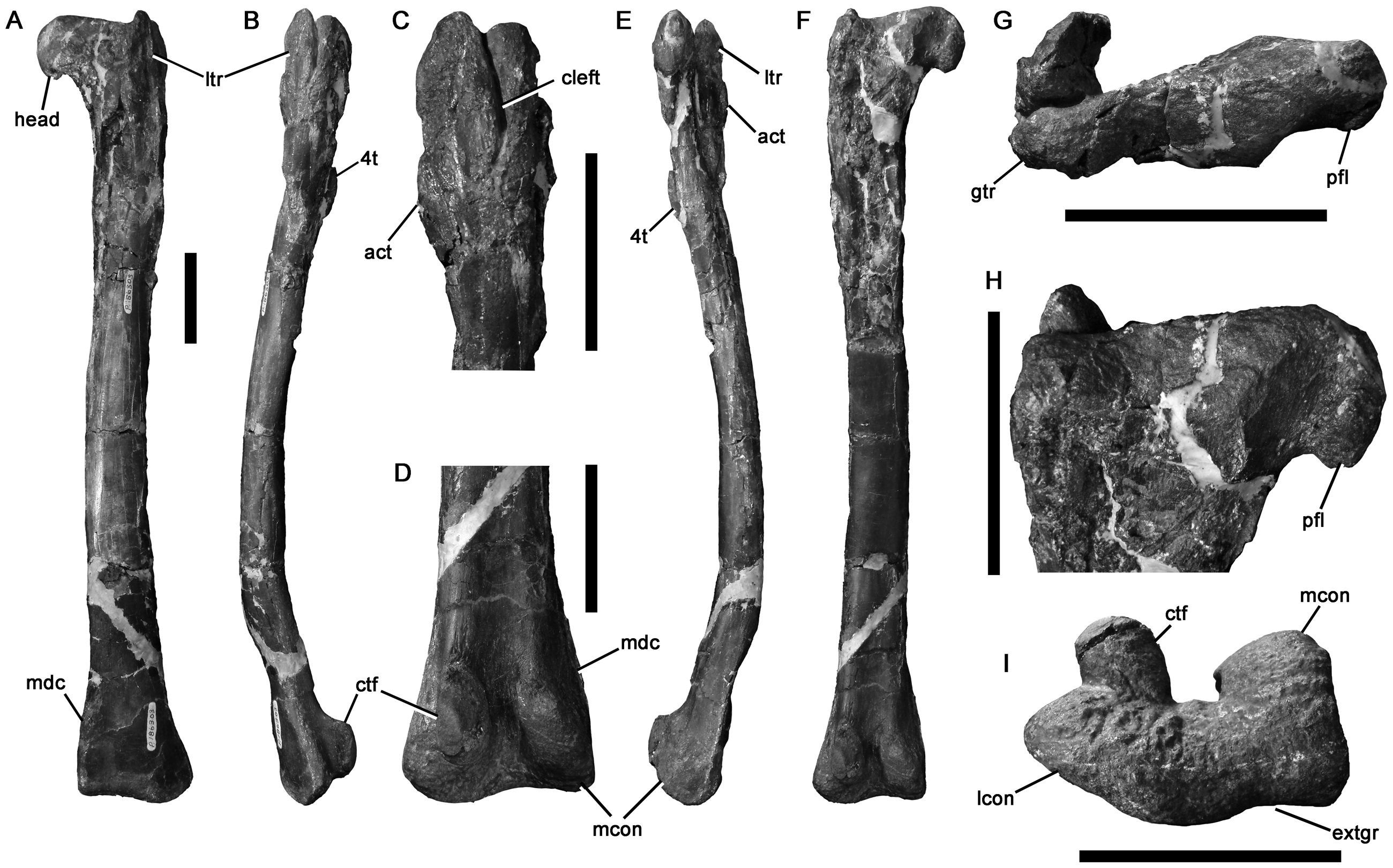
- Holotypic left femur of T. hermani, NMV P186303

Scientific classification
- Kingdom: Animalia
- Phylum: Chordata
- Class: Reptilia
- Clade: Dinosauria
- Clade: Saurischia
- Clade: Theropoda
- Genus: †Timimus; Rich & Vickers-Rich, 1993
- Species: †T. hermani

Binomial name
- †Timimus hermani Rich & Vickers-Rich, 1993

= Timimus =

Timimus Temporal range: Early Cretaceous 106 Ma

Extinct genus of dinosaurs

Timimus is a genus of small coelurosaurian theropod dinosaur from the Early Cretaceous of Australia. It was originally identified as an ornithomimosaur, but now it is thought to be a different kind of theropod, possibly a tyrannosauroid.

== Discovery and species ==
In 1991, two femora (thighbones), one from an adult and one from a juvenile, were found within a metre of each other at the Dinosaur Cove East site, in the small "Lake Copco" quarry, at the southern tip of Australia. The type species, Timimus hermani, was formally named and shortly described by Dr Thomas Rich and his wife Patricia Vickers-Rich in 1993/1994. The generic name means "Tim's Mimic" and combines the name of both the discoverers' son Timothy Rich and palaeontologist Tim Flannery with a Latin mimus, "mimic", a reference to the presumed affinity of the species with the Ornithomimosauria. The specific name honours volunteer John Herman who, for many years, assisted the Dinosaur Cove project.

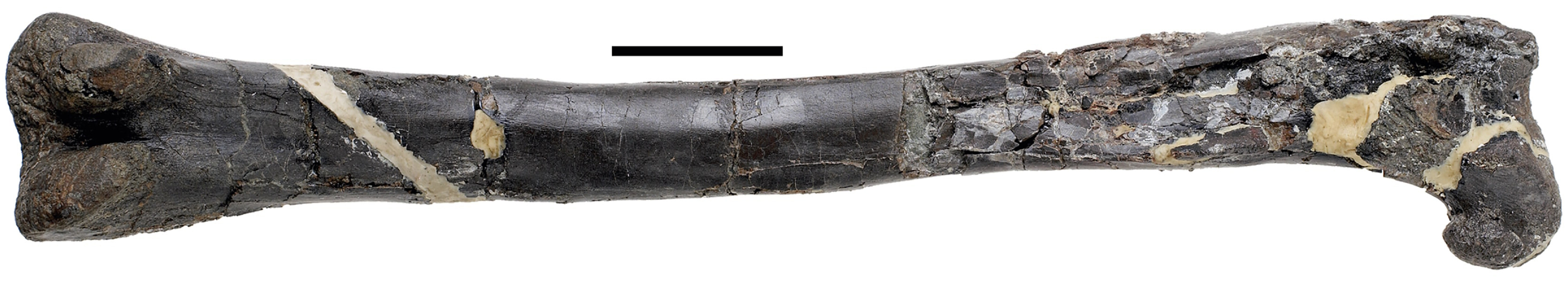
Colour photo of the left femur

The holotype specimen, NMV P186303, was found in a layer of the Eumeralla Formation, dating to the Albian faunal stage in the early Cretaceous, some 106 million years ago. It consists of a left femur of an adult individual.

In 1994, Dr. Thomas Rich commented that, while it would have been more ideal to have had the most complete specimen possible as a holotype, it was highly unlikely that future material of Timimus would be found, due to the limited nature of sites to be explored in the area. Also, the holotype would have had characteristics which both identified it as an ornithomimosaur and a new genus within that group. Thus the name would serve as a reference point for the material within paleontological literature. Rich stated: "By themselves, the names of dinosaurs are like telephone numbers - they are labels that go with specimens and the ideas that flow from the analysis of the material. Confusing labels, like an inaccurate telephone book, lead to an unworkable system, so one must be careful in putting names or labels on things. But the act of doing so is not creating those specimens or the ideas associated with them; it is merely creating a convenient "handle" for purposes of communication".

The second femur, that of a juvenile, was assigned as the paratype specimen NMV P186323. However, based on differences between the two femora that were likely unrelated to conspecific allometry or ontogeny, later researchers have suggested that the paratype femur may instead represent an indeterminate maniraptoran. Some vertebrae from the site have been referred to the also been referred to Timimus, as well as some other South Australian material.

== Description ==
Timimus restored as a tyrannosauroid, with the holotype femur shown in place

The holotype thighbone is 44 centimetres long. From this, a total length of the animal of 2.5 metres has been extrapolated. The slenderness of the bone suggest a lithe animal. The paratype femur is 19.5 centimetres long. The femora show several features that were considered diagnostic. There is no extensor groove between the condyles of the lower joint, which would have been a basal trait for an ornithomimosaur. The femoral head is anteroposteriorally flattened. The anterior trochanter is in a high position and reaches the level of the major trochanter. In 2016 the NMV P186303 specimen was estimated to be 4.3 meters (14 ft) long, and 200 kg (441 lbs) in weight.

== Phylogeny ==
In 1994, the describers assigned Timimus to the "Ornithomimosauridae", with which the Ornithomimidae were meant. Ornithomimosaur remains from Gondwana are rare and dubious; Timimus was thus presented as proof that the group was indeed present in the Southern Hemisphere and would even have originated there. Immediately, however, a position within the Ornithomimosauria was doubted by Thomas Holtz. Today, it is recognised that Timimus shares no derived traits, synapomorphies, with the Ornithomimosauria and thus any proof it would belong to this group is lacking. It perhaps belongs to some coelurosaurian group; some workers consider it a nomen dubium. A 2010 study classified Timimus within Paraves, specifically as Dromaeosauridae? indet. cf. Unenlagiinae. A 2012 study found it to be a valid tyrannosauroid, a conclusion supported by Delcourt and Grillo (2018) who recovered Timimus as a tyrannosauroid in two phylogenetic analyses but as a sister taxon of Tyrannoraptora (outside Tyrannosauroidea) in one analysis.

== Paleobiology ==
The habitat of Timimus consisted of polar forests with mild summers but cold and dark winters due to the closer proximity of the area to the South Pole during the Early Cretaceous. In 1996, Anusuya Chinsamy, an expert on the microstructure of fossil bones, examined bone material from Timimus and Leaellynasaura and discovered they exhibited different bone histology. The ornithischian showed a continuous rate of bone deposition, while the coelurosaur had a cyclical pattern of bone formation, which suggested Timimus may have hibernated in colder months. A possible Timimus hermani or related form from the Strzelecki Group near Inverloch, Victoria left a fossil of the first phalanx of its third toe with a depressed fracture on the plantar surface.
