= Dinosaur Dreaming =

Coordinates: 38°39′22″S 145°41′10″E

Dinosaur Dreaming is a paleontological site situated near Inverloch, Victoria, Australia. Remains of primitive mammals from the Cretaceous Age were first uncovered there in 1997 by researchers from Museum Victoria and the Monash University Science Centre.

The remains of early mammals, dinosaurs, and fossil bones of Cretaceous Age reptiles, birds, and fishes can be found at the Inverloch dig site. Australia's first dinosaur bone, the Cape Paterson Claw, was discovered near Inverloch in 1903 by William Hamilton Ferguson. The fossils at Inverloch date to the mid Cretaceous.

== See also ==
- Dinosaur Cove
- List of fossil sites (with link directory)
