= Thomas Rich =

Thomas Rich may refer to:

- Sir Thomas Rich, 1st Baronet (1601–1667), English politician
- Sir Thomas Rich, 5th Baronet (c.1733–1803), British naval officer and politician
- Thomas Rich (American politician) (1830–1899), English-born American politician in Iowa
- Thomas F. Rich, known as Ösel Tendzin, American-born teacher of Tibetan Buddhism
- Tommy Rich (born 1956), professional wrestler
- Sir Thomas Rich's School
- Tom Rich, Australian paleontologist
