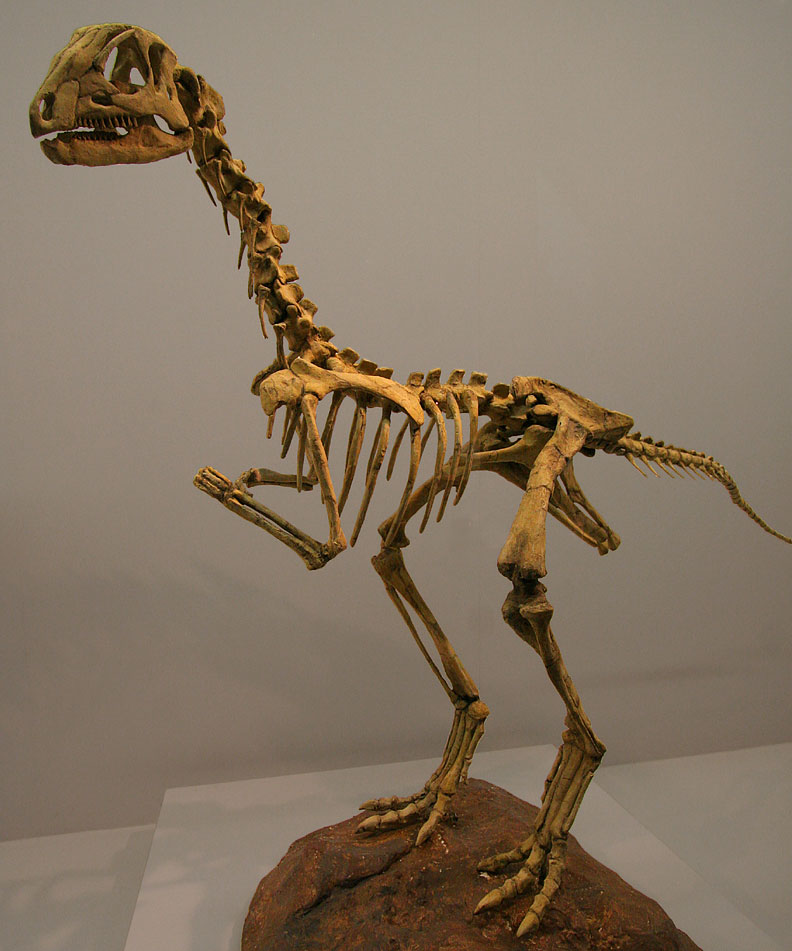
- Anabisetia

Scientific classification
- Kingdom: Animalia
- Phylum: Chordata
- Class: Reptilia
- Clade: Dinosauria
- Clade: †Ornithischia
- Clade: †Ornithopoda
- Clade: †Elasmaria; Calvo, Porfiri, and Novas, 2007

Genera
- †Anabisetia; †Atlascopcosaurus; †Chakisaurus; †Diluvicursor; †Fostoria?; †Fulgurotherium; †Galleonosaurus; †Gasparinisaura; †Isasicursor; †Iyuku?; †Kangnasaurus?; †Leaellynasaura; †Macrogryphosaurus; †Mahuidacursor; †Morrosaurus; †Muttaburrasaurus?; †Notohypsilophodon; †Qantassaurus; †Sektensaurus; †Talenkauen; †Tietasaura; †Trinisaura; †Weewarrasaurus

= Elasmaria =

Elasmarians Temporal range: Cretaceous, 127–66 Ma

Extinct clade of dinosaurs

Elasmaria is a clade of ornithopods known from Cretaceous deposits in the former Gondwana (South America, Antarctica, Australia, and possibly Africa) that contains many bipedal ornithopods that were previously considered "hypsilophodonts".

== Classification ==
Calvo et al. (2007) coined Elasmaria to accommodate Macrogryphosaurus and Talenkauen, which they recovered as basal iguanodonts distinct from other iguanodontians in having mineralized plates on the ribs. In 2016, a paper describing the genus Morrosaurus found Elasmaria to be far larger than its initial contents of two taxa, instead containing a variety of ornithopods from the Southern Hemisphere. In 2021, under the Phylocode, Madzia et al. (2021) formally defined Elasmaria as "the smallest clade containing Macrogryphosaurus gondwanicus and Talenkauen santacrucensis, provided that it does not include Hypsilophodon foxii, Iguanodon bernissartensis, or Thescelosaurus neglectus. Fonseca et al. (2024) redefined Elasmaria as "the largest clade containing Macrogryphosaurus gondwanicus and Talenkauen santacrucensis but not Dryosaurus altus, Hypsilophodon foxii, Iguanodon bernissartensis, and Thescelosaurus neglectus" so that it included more related taxa. The cladogram below follows their preferred reference phylogeny, taken from the results of their own study.

- Ornithopoda
  - Hypsilophodontidae
    - Gideonmantellia amosanjuanae
    - Hypsilophodon foxii
  - Iguanodontia
    - Rhabdodontomorpha
    - Euiguanodontia
      - Callovosaurus leedsi
      - Dryomorpha
        - Dryosauridae
          - - Elrhazosaurus nigeriensis
            - Valdosaurus canaliculatus
          - - Eousdryosaurus nanohallucis
            - - Dysalotosaurus lettowvorbecki
              - - Dryosaurus altus
                - Dryosaurus elderae
        - - CM 1949
          - - - Draconyx loureiroi
              - Oblitosaurus bunnueli
            - - Camptosauridae
                - Camptosaurus dispar
                - Uteodon aphanoecetes
              - Styracosterna
                - Cumnoria prestwichii
                - - Owenodon hoggii
                  - - Hippodraco scutodens
                    - - Ouranosaurus nigeriensis
                      - - Iguanodon bernissartensis
                        - Hadrosauroidea
      - Elasmaria
        - Iyuku raathi
        - - Weewarrasaurus pobeni
          - - Kangnasaurus coetzeei
            - - - Anabisetia saldiviai
                - Diluvicursor pickeringi
              - - - Notohypsilophodon comodorensis
                  - - Trinisaura santamartaensis
                    - Gasparinisaura cincosaltensis
                - - Galleonosaurus dorisae
                  - Mahuidacursor lipanglef
                  - Morrosaurus antarcticus
                  - Atlascopcosaurus loadsi
                  - Qantassaurus intrepidus
                  - Fostoria dhimbangunmal
                  - Isasicursor santacrucensis
                  - Muttaburrasaurus langdoni
                  - Talenkauen santacrucensis
                  - Sektensaurus sanjuanboscoi
                  - Leaellynasaura amicagraphica
                  - Macrogryphosaurus gondwanicus
