= William Rich =

William Rich may refer to:

- Sir William Rich, 2nd Baronet, (c. 1654–1711), MP
- Sir William Rich, 4th Baronet (c. 1702–1762), see Rich baronets
- William Rich (botanist), American botanist and explorer

== See also ==
- William the Rich (disambiguation)
