= Tibial condyle =

Tibial condyle can refer to:

- Medial condyle of tibia
- Lateral condyle of tibia
