= Dinosaur Cove =

- Location in Victoria

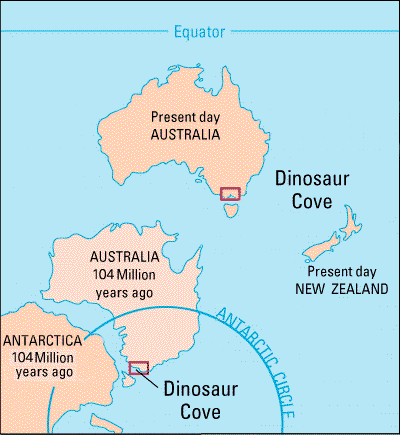
- During the Cretaceous the site (red boxes) was within the Antarctic Circle
- Location: The Otways, Victoria
- Coordinates: 38°46′48″S 143°24′18″E
- Type: Bay
- Basin countries: Australia

The Dinosaur Cove in Victoria, Australia is a fossil-bearing site in the south-east of the continent where the Otway Ranges meet the sea to the west of Cape Otway, adjacent to Great Otway National Park (map). The inaccessible ocean-front cliffs include fossil-bearing strata of the Eumeralla Formation that date back to about 106 million years ago and has provided discoveries important in the research of the natural history of dinosaurs in Australia and the Southern Hemisphere as a whole.

== Geological time-line ==
During the Early Cretaceous the location was a flood plain within a great rift valley that formed as Australia started to separate northward from Antarctica. Sand, mud and silt deposits covered and sometimes preserved the remains of dead animals and plants. As the rift valley sank, the deposits were overlaid by sediment, which turned to rock under pressure. In the last 30 million years the sediments have been uplifted to form the Otway Ranges and Strzelecki Ranges, bringing them near the surface again.

The richest find of petrified dinosaur bones is confined to narrow thin (up to 0.3 m) layers, most likely ancient stream beds serving as repositories of the bones of smaller animals.

=== History of discovery ===
In 1903, geologist William Hamilton Ferguson was mapping the rocky coastal outcrops a few kilometres west of Inverloch and uncovered the first dinosaur fossil ever discovered in Australia. 75 years later, the exploration and excavation of the Dinosaur Cove site was conducted by teams of volunteers overseen by Tom Rich and Patricia Rich. The dinosaur taxa, Leaellynasaura amicagraphica and Timimus hermani, are named for the children of the Riches', Tim and Leaellyn. Heavy mining equipment and dynamite was used to blast away overlying strata to uncover the fossiliferous rock layers in the cliff face.

Over geological time since, the rock was pushed so deep that heat and pressure hardened it much, before it came again to the surface. As a result, a common way to look for fossils in it was to break each lump with a sledgehammer, and after each blow to examine all new broken surfaces for cross-sections of bone. Any pieces that showed bone were sent to the laboratory to extract the bone by careful preparation.

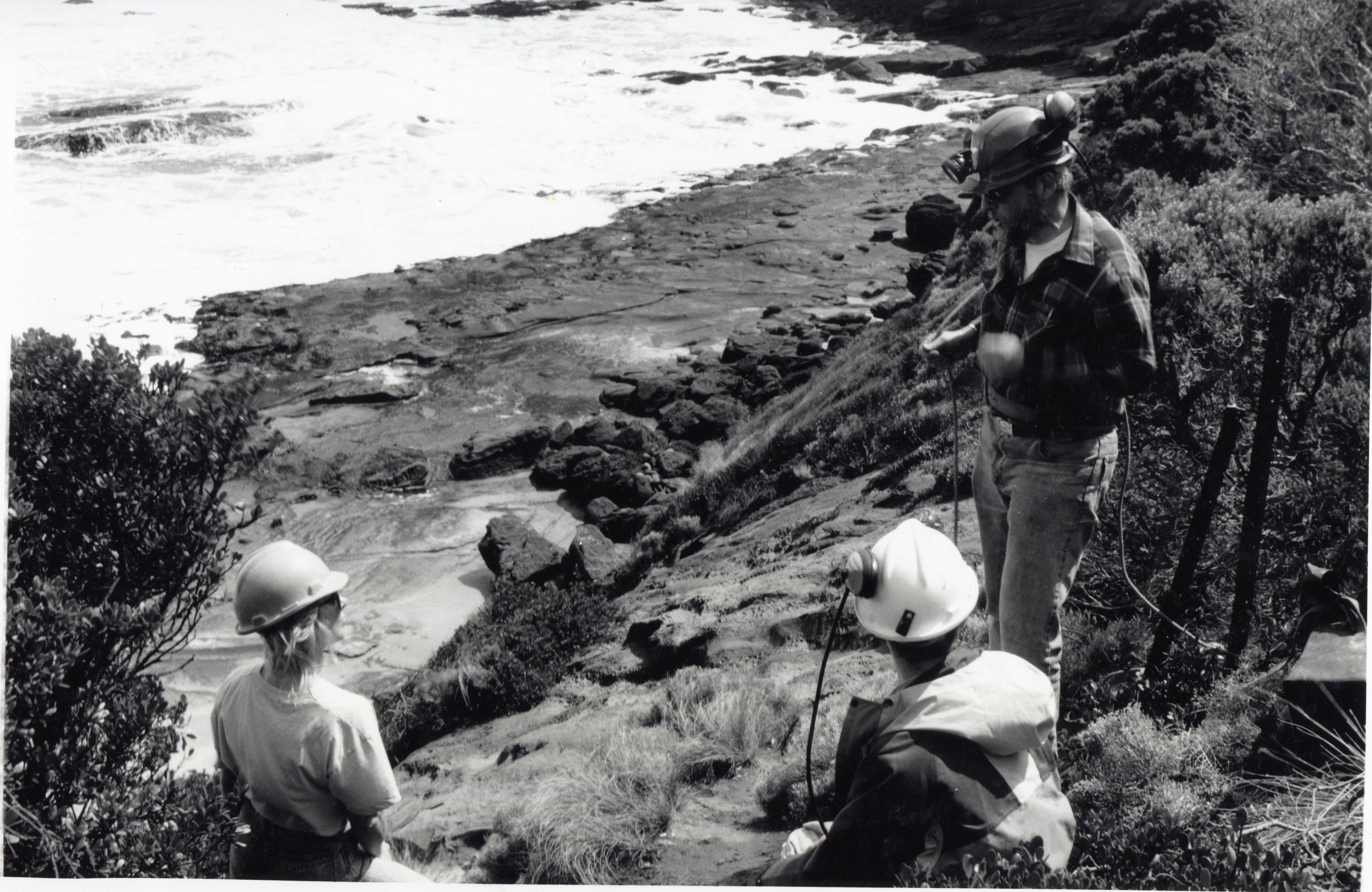
Tom Rich (right) at Dinosaur Cove, Victoria, Australia c.1995

In the 1980s and 90s Dinosaur Cove yielded hypsilophodontid-like dinosaurs as Leaellynasaura amicagraphica and Atlascopcosaurus loadsi, and a Coelurosaur, as well as fragments of what may be a caenagnathid (relatives of the Oviraptors). One fossil from this diverse taxa, collectively called the "polar dinosaurs of Australia", has been interpreted as showing possible adaptations to vision in low light conditions and possibly were warm-blooded; this has been suggested as an explanation for how some of these dinosaurs foraged for food during the polar winter months. Although these dinosaurs lived at polar latitudes, the Cretaceous climate was significantly milder than today, so temperatures within the Antarctic and Arctic Circles were vastly different from the climate at these latitudes today because the lopsided arrangements of the continents made sea currents and monsoon winds blow across the polar areas and not around them, and so stopped cold pools from developing around the poles.

== See also ==
- Dinosaur Dreaming
- List of fossil sites
