= William the Rich =

William the Rich may refer to:

- William I, Count of Nassau-Siegen (1487–1559)
- William, Duke of Jülich-Cleves-Berg (1516–1592)
- William Jennens (1701–1798) William the Miser, William the Rich, 'the richest commoner in England' who died intestate. The legal case dragged on for over 100 years.
