= Mahuidacursor =

Mahuidacursor Temporal range: Santonian ~86–83 Ma

Scientific classification
- Kingdom: Animalia
- Phylum: Chordata
- Class: Reptilia
- Clade: Dinosauria
- Clade: †Ornithischia
- Clade: †Ornithopoda
- Clade: †Elasmaria
- Genus: †Mahuidacursor; Cruzado Caballero et al. 2019

Type species
- †Mahuidacursor lipanglef Cruzado Caballero et al. 2019

Extinct genus of ornithopod dinosaur

Mahuidacursor (meaning "mountain runner", mahuida meaning "mountain" in Mapudungun) is a genus of a basal ornithopod dinosaur from the Santonian Bajo de la Carpa Formation of the Neuquén Basin in northern Patagonia, Argentina. The type and only species is M. lipanglef.
