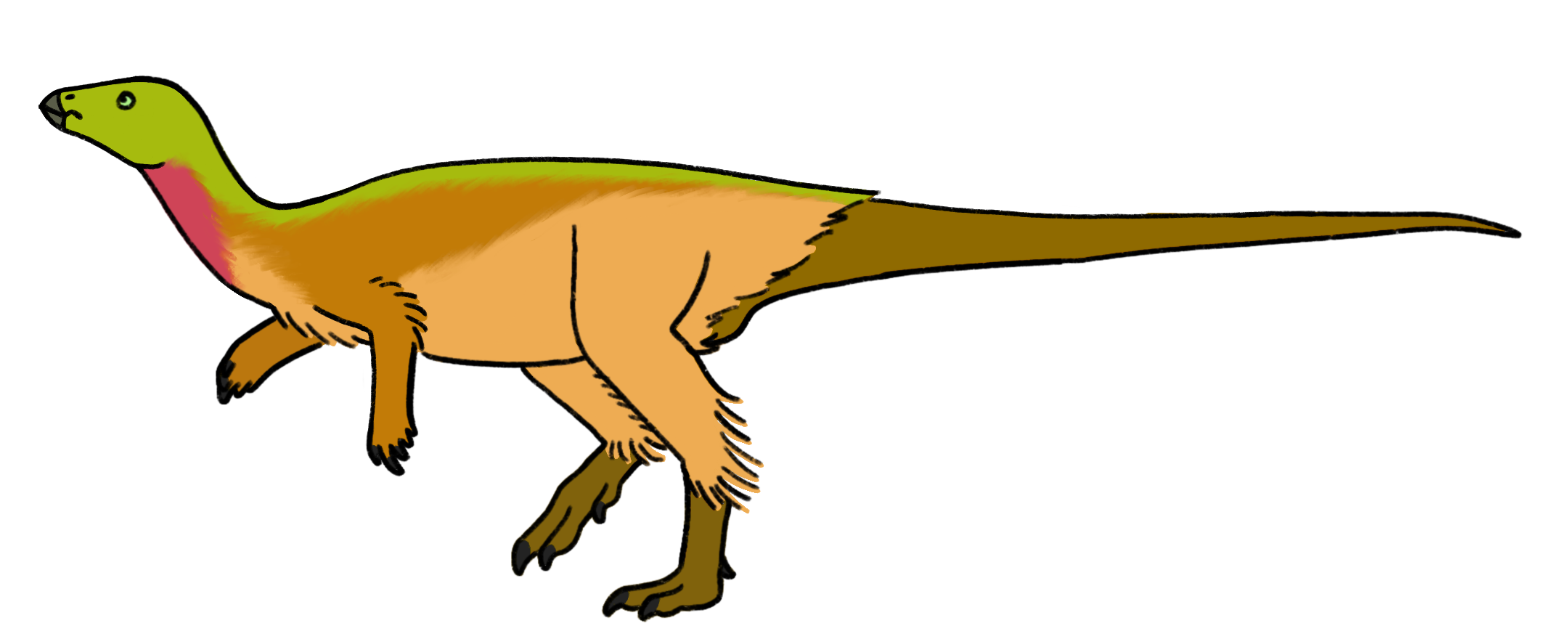
- Life restoration of Notohypsilophodon

Scientific classification
- Domain: Eukaryota
- Kingdom: Animalia
- Phylum: Chordata
- Clade: Dinosauria
- Clade: †Ornithischia
- Clade: †Ornithopoda
- Clade: †Elasmaria
- Genus: †Notohypsilophodon; Martínez, 1998
- Species: †N. comodorensis

Binomial name
- †Notohypsilophodon comodorensis Martínez, 1998

= Notohypsilophodon =

Notohypsilophodon Temporal range: Late Cretaceous, 99.6–89.8 Ma

Extinct genus of dinosaurs

Notohypsilophodon (meaning "southern Hypsilophodon") is a genus of ornithopod dinosaur from the Late Cretaceous of Argentina. It was described as the only "hypsilophodont" known from South America, although this assessment is not universally supported, and Gasparinisaura is now believed to have been a basal euornithopod as well.

== History of discovery ==
From 1985 onwards the Laboratorio de Paleovertebrados of the Universidad Nacional de la Patagonia "San Juan Bosco" organised excavations in the late Cenomanian-early Turonian-age Bajo Barreal Formation of the San Jorge Basin, northern Chubut, Patagonia. At Buen Pasto near Comodoro Rivadavia a partial juvenile skeleton lacking the skull, was found.

In 1998 this find was named and described by Rubén D. Martínez as the type species Notohypsilophodon comodorensis. The generic name combines a Greek νότος, notos, "south wind" with the name of the genus Hypsilophodon. The specific name refers to Comodoro Rivadavia.

Notohypsilophodon is based on the holotype specimen UNPSJB — PV 942, a partial skeleton including four neck, seven back, five hip, and six tail vertebrae, four rib fragments, a partial left scapula (shoulder blade), partial right coracoid, a right humerus (upper arm bone), both ulnae, and most of a left leg (minus the foot), a right fibula and astragalus, and thirteen phalanges. Because the neural arches are not fused to the bodies of the vertebrae, its describer regarded the individual as not fully grown.

== Description ==
As a "hypsilophodontid" or other basal ornithopod, Notohypsilophodon would have been a bipedal herbivore. Its size was not estimated in the describing article, but as most adult hypsilophodonts were 1 to 2 meters (3.3 to 6.6 ft) long, this genus would probably have been of similar size. In 2010 Gregory S. Paul gave an estimation of 1.3 metres (4.3 ft) for the length, 6 kilograms (13 lb) for the weight of the animal.

== Phylogeny ==
Martínez found no evidence that Notohypsilophodon was an iguanodont, and instead assigned it to the more basal Hypsilophodontidae, which made it at the time the only South American hypsilophodont. A hypsilophodontid assignment was supported by Rodolfo Coria in a 1999 review of South American ornithopods, but a more recent review of basal ornithopods found the fossil remains to be too fragmentary for classification beyond Euornithopoda, a clade within Ornithopoda including the "hypsilophodonts" and iguanodonts. Moreover, the Hypsilophodontidae are today considered to be a paraphyletic group, not consisting of directly related species forming a separate branch, but representing a series of successive branches splitting off the main euornithopod tree. A recent redescription of Notohypsilophodon found it to be basal in Ornithopoda, more primitive than Gasparinisaura. In 2015, it was found to be part of the clade Elasmaria along with other Antarctic and Patagonian ornithopods.

Cladogram based in the phylogenetic analysis of Rozadilla et al., 2015:

- - Hypsilophodon
  - - Thescelosaurus
    - Iguanodontia
      - Elasmaria
        - Gasparinisaura
        - - Morrosaurus
          - Trinisaura
          - Macrogryphosaurus
          - Notohypsilophodon
          - Talenkauen
          - Anabisetia
      - - Parksosaurus
        - - Kangnasaurus
          - - Rhabdodontidae
            - - Tenontosaurus
              - Dryomorpha
