= Tom Rich =

Australian palaeontologist

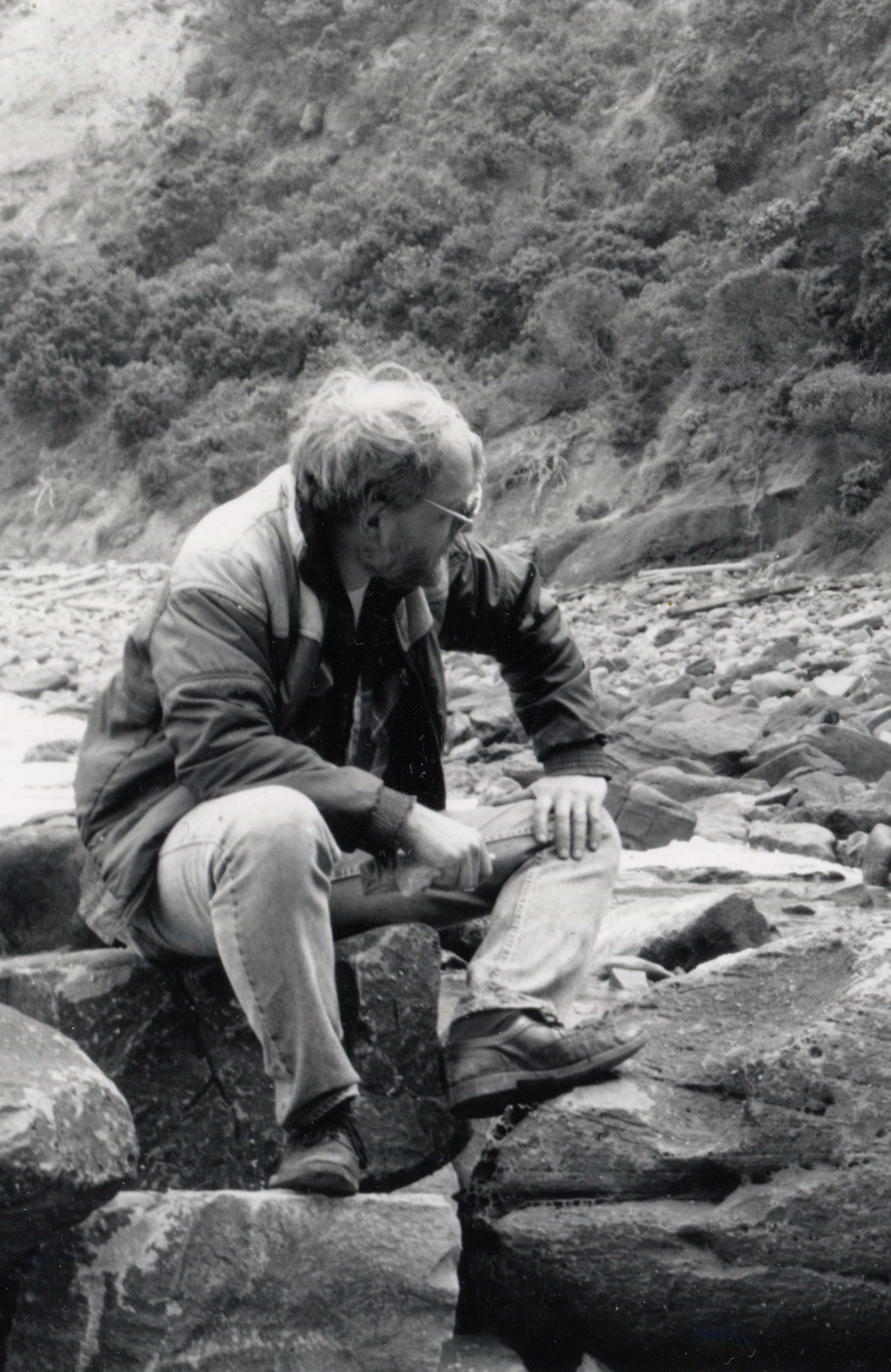
- Tom Rich at Dinosaur Cove, Australia, c. 1995
- Born: Thomas H. Rich; May 30, 1941 (age 85); United States
- Scientific career
- Institutions: Museums Victoria

Thomas H. Rich (born May 30, 1941), generally known as Tom Rich, is an Australian palaeontologist. He and his wife, Patricia Arlene Vickers-Rich headed the dig at Dinosaur Cove. He is, as of 2025, Senior Curator of Vertebrate Palaeontology at Museums Victoria.

== Education and career ==
- He was a student of Professor Ruben Arthur Stirton. This pushed him to become aware of potential in Australia to make fundamental discoveries about mammalian evolution
- Received his Bachelor of Arts degree in 1964 and his Masters in 1967 at the University of California, Berkeley
- He graduated in 1973 from Columbia University in New York City with a Ph.D. in Geology.

=== Career and professional positions ===
- Rich trained as a Vertebrate paleontologist at University of California, Berkeley and Columbia University.
- His research has revolved around finding and analyzing the Early Cretaceous Polar Dinosaurs, mammals and other tetrapods of southeastern Australia.
- His work is also known as the Ghastly Blank project, beginning in 1978 and the summaries of the field work and scientific results are recorded in the book Darkness and Dinosaurs, which he wrote with his wife.

== The dig at Dinosaur Cove ==
The dig at Dinosaur Cove took place on the Otway Coast of Victoria, Australia. Beginning in 1984, the project lasted nearly a decade, with the tunnels finally being boarded up in 1993. The dig was the culmination of the efforts of over 700 people, with a large contribution from volunteer work. This was his most important work, and it was start by both Rich and his wife and colleague, Patricia Vickers-Rich. The dig was featured on the BBC mini documentary series Walking with Dinosaurs in episode 5, Spirits of the Silent Forest, which aired in 1999.

=== Accomplishments ===
- Rich has collected more than 85 percent of all the known Mesozoic Mammal fossils in Australia
- He was the first to recognize the pseudotribosphenic condition and its significance in mammals.
- He found and described the only multituberculates and tribosphenic Masozoic mammals known from Australia.
- He excavated the first two tunnels to be cut for the sole purpose of recovering fossils.
- He recognized the first features of a non-avian dinosaur, adapted specifically for a polar environment.

== Publications ==
- Three decades, 37 bones: the long hunt for Victorian Dinosaurs. Thomas H. Rich and Roger Benson
- Dinosaurs of Darkness. Thomas H. Rich and Patricia Arlene Vickers-Rich
- Dinosaurs of Darkness: In search of the Lost Polar World. Thomas H. Rich and Patricia Arlene Vickers-Rich
- The Artist and the Scientists: Bringing Prehistory to Life. Peter Trusler, Thomas H. Rich and Patricia Arlene Vickers-Rich

== Personal life ==
Thomas H. Rich was born on May 30, 1941, in the United States. Rich is married to palaeontologist Patricia Arlene Vickers-Rich. Together the couple described the dinosaur genera Leaellynasaura and Timimus, naming them after their daughter and son, Leaellyn and Tim Rich, respectively.

In 2012, Thomas Rich was diagnosed with Macular Degeneration, an eye disease that causes loss of vision. In an effort to treat his condition, he became the first Australian to use IrisVision.

Thomas Rich is also honored in the epithet of the ancient thylacinid species Nimbacinus richi.
