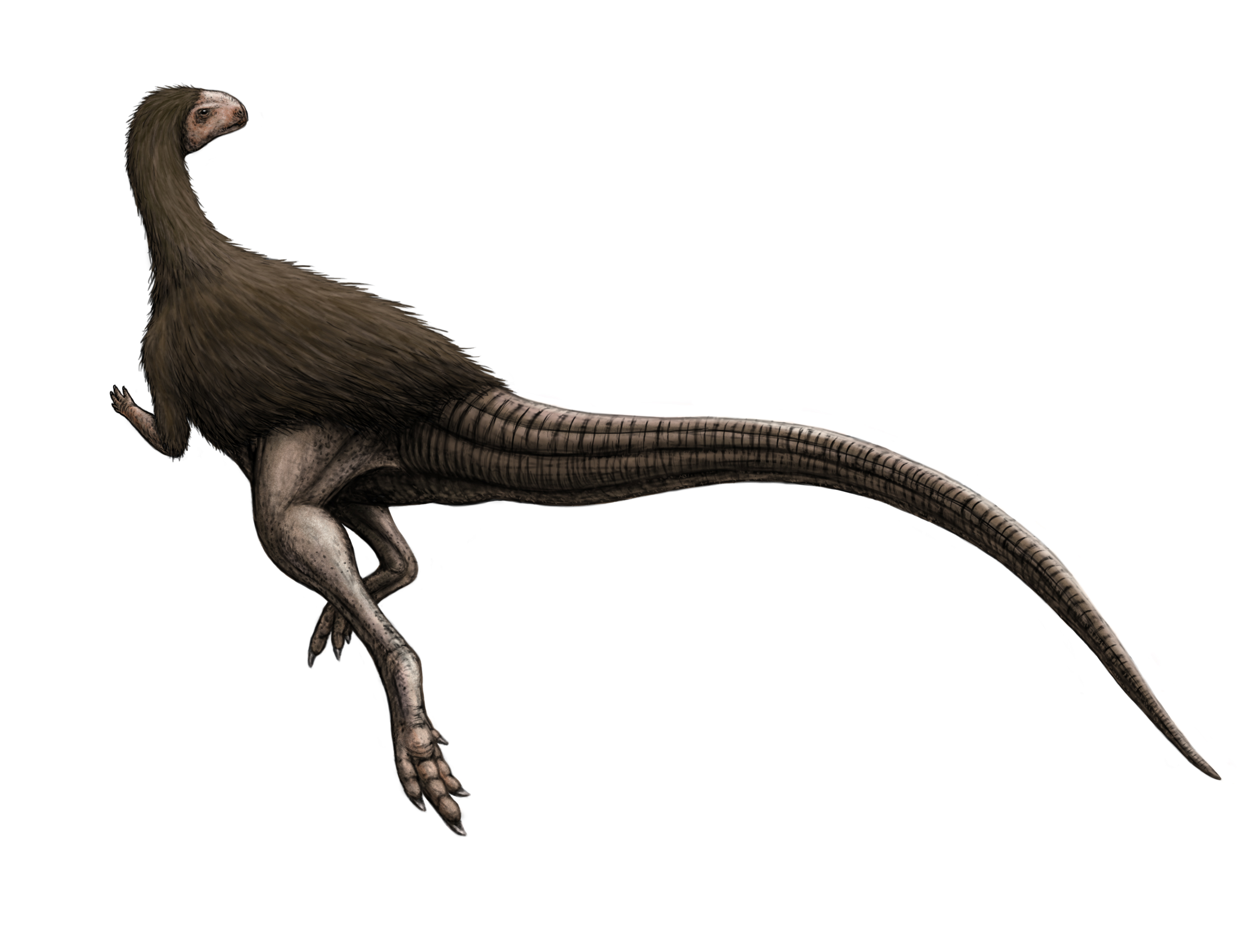
- Life restoration

Scientific classification
- Kingdom: Animalia
- Phylum: Chordata
- Class: Reptilia
- Clade: Dinosauria
- Clade: †Ornithischia
- Clade: †Ornithopoda
- Clade: †Elasmaria
- Genus: †Morrosaurus; Rozadilla et al., 2016
- Species: †M. antarcticus

Binomial name
- †Morrosaurus antarcticus Rozadilla et al., 2016

= Morrosaurus =

Morrosaurus Temporal range: Maastrichtian ~70–66 Ma

Extinct genus of dinosaurs

Morrosaurus is an extinct genus of herbivorous elasmarian dinosaur that lived in the late Cretaceous in Antarctica. The only known species is the type Morrosaurus antarcticus.

== Discovery ==
In 2002, the Argentine paleontologist Fernando Novas reported the discovery of a partial skeleton of a euornithopod in Antarctica. In 2016 these remains were the basis for naming the type species Morrosaurus antarcticus, named and described by Sebastian Rozadilla, Federico Lisandro Agnolin, Fernando Emilio Novas, Alexis Rolando Aranciaga Mauro, Matthew J. Motta, Juan Manuel Lirio Marcelo, and Pablo Isasi. The genus name refers to the site of El Morro on James Ross Island, where the remains of the species were found. The specific name refers to Antarctica.

The holotype specimen MACN Pv 197, was found in a layer of the Snow Hill Island Formation (Cape Lambe, previously assigned to the López de Bertodano Formation), dating to the Maastrichtian age. The remains consists in a right hind leg, including the top of the femur, the lower end of the femur, the upper part of the tibia, the underside of the tibia, the upper half of the foot, the bottom of the midfoot and the top of the first joint of the third toe.

== Description ==
The only known specimen, thought to represent an adult, is estimated to have belong to an individual 4.5–5 metres (15–16 ft) in length. This makes it larger and more robust in skeletal build than many of its relatives, including the fellow Antarctic genus Trinisaura, only 1.5 metres (4.9 ft) in length. The fragmentary nature of the material precludes saying much about the preserved regions. It is united anatomically with other elasmarians by the strongly compressed outer front edge of the greater trochanter, lacking the distinct cleft and thick edge seen in other types of ornithopod. Other uniting traits of elasmarians seen in the humerus and vertebrae cannot be evaluated in Morrosaurus due to their lack of preservation in the genus. The femur seems to have been rather gracile, though more stout than in Trinisaura, as was the elongate foot, with the central third metatarsal being larger than the others.

A series of distinctive features characterizes the genus. Two of these are autapomorphies, completely unique traits acquired by the taxon. In bottom view, the greater trochanter near the top of the femur forms an S-shape, with the back edge thick across and the front edge thin, similar to the condition seen in other elasmarians Anabisetia, Notohypsilophodon, and Gasparinisaura but displayed to a more extreme extent. The fourth metatarsal bone has a prominent rearward projection that wraps around the third metatarsal, likewise similar but more developed to the condition seen in Gasparinisaura as well as Kangnasaurus, a genus with overall similar morphology and proportions to Morrosaurus. In addition, there is a unique combination of two features that by themselves are not unique features. In the femur, the lesser trochanter is positioned forward and to the outside of the greater trochanter. In the tibia, medial malleolus has a triangular shape from the front and a concave surface from the same angle.

== Phylogeny ==
Morrosaurus was classified in the group Iguanodontia, as a basal member of Euiguanodontia. This in turn formed a clade with other ornithopods of Patagonia and Antarctica, particularly Trinisaura, Gasparinisaura, Anabisetia, Notohypsilophodon, Talenkauen and Macrogryphosaurus in a group called Elasmaria, whose members are distinguished by their adaptation to a running lifestyle which would be reflected by the narrow foot with a thin fourth metatarsal which indicates a high speed running; subsequently expanded chevrons, a feature that is associated with a greater surface area for attachment of the lateral muscles of the tail, which would give good control of the movements of this; and a curved humerus which demonstrates the absence of a deltopectoral ridge and therefore that the front leg was not used for walking. It cannot be determined, however, if Morrosaurus itself possessed these characteristics due to their limited remains. The existence of this clade may indicate that Patagonia, Antarctica and Australia shared the same type of fauna. The exact phylogenetic relationships within this clade could not be identified, except for Gasparinisaura, which proved to be the most basal member of group.

Cladogram based in the phylogenetic analysis of Rozadilla et al., 2016:

- - Hypsilophodon
  - - Thescelosaurus
    - Iguanodontia
      - Elasmaria
        - Gasparinisaura
        - - Morrosaurus
          - Trinisaura
          - Macrogryphosaurus
          - Notohypsilophodon
          - Talenkauen
          - Anabisetia
      - - Parksosaurus
        - - Kangnasaurus
          - - Rhabdodontidae
            - - Tenontosaurus
              - Dryomorpha

== Palaeobiology ==
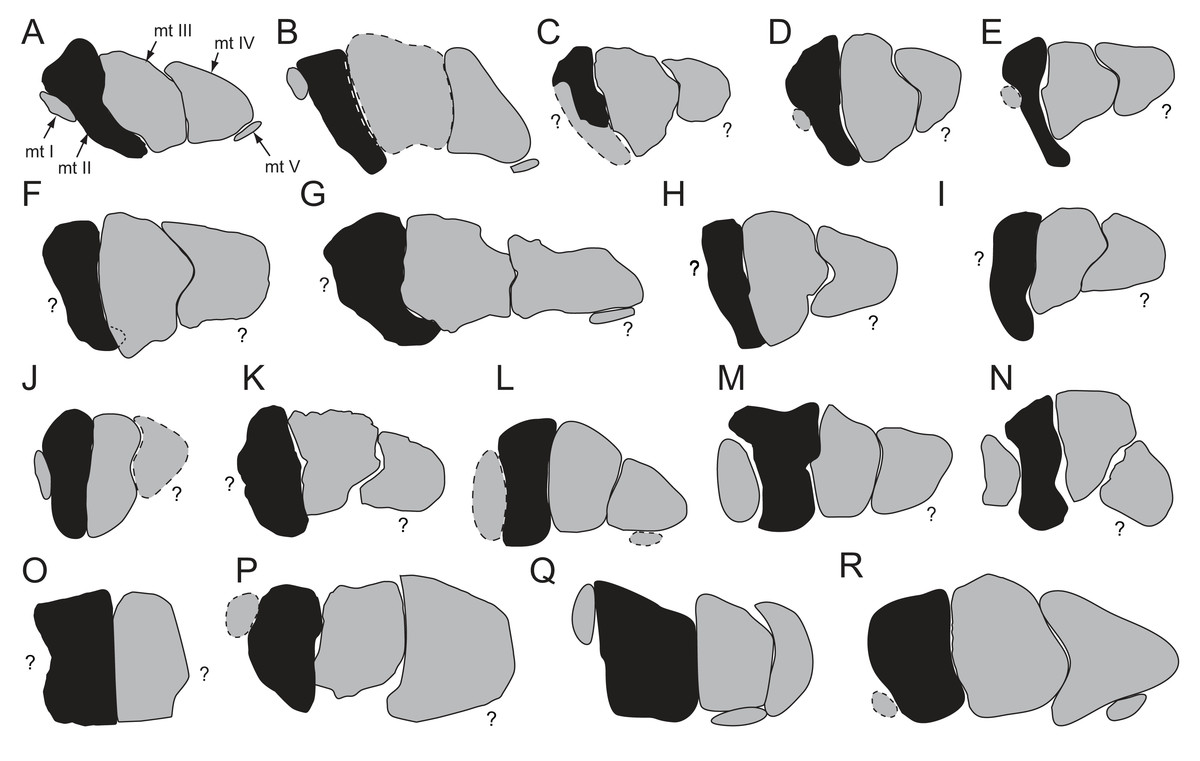
Metatarsals of ornithopods from above; these bones in Morrosaurus (C) and other elasmarians (A, B, D, E, P) demonstrate their developed running abilities and have been studied to evaluate their growth rates

The hindlimb anatomy of Morrosaurus and other elasmarians, such as the slim shape of the metatarsus, indicates they had adept running abilities compared to other herbivores in their ecosystem. Though unpreserved in Morrosaurus, fossils of its relatives show traits such an expanded chevrons and distinctive bony plates (intercostal plates) placed along the sides of the torso that would have granted them beneficial running traits such as strong balance, muscle control, and breathing efficiency. Though more primitive relatives such as Hypsilophodon were also strong runners, elasmarians show greater development in tail musculature and other running-associated traits than other ornithopods.

Study of the histological properties of thin bone slices from the fibula and fourth metatarsal of Morrosaurus and the related Antarctic genus Trinisaura indicate they had similar growth strategies to South American relatives such as Gasparinisaura, which lived outside of the Antarctic Circle. This conforms to previous studies of Antarctic dinosaurs, but contrasts with those from the polar regions of the North Hemisphere (such as Edmontosaurus and Pachyrhinosaurus) that show distinct histology from relatives that lived in less extreme temperatures. Morrosaurus, Trinisaura, and Gasparinisaura all show variation in growth signs, with typical rapid growth intermittently interrupted and a trend towards slower growth towards age. This strategy of rapid growith but interruptions would have been a beneficial adaptation in the Antarctic region where resource availability varied throughout the year. Other more distantly related ornithopods and dinosaurs at much lower latitudes show similar cyclical growth strategies. Thus, elasmarians appear to have ancestrally possessed adaptations that allowed them to thrive at low latitudes rather than having acquired adaptations specifically for this geographic range. Growth rates were higher Morosaurus than Trinisaura, consistent with its larger body size. The only known specimen was a subadult that had reached sexual maturity but not completely ceased its growth (somatic maturity), a pattern seen in many dinosaurs. Fossils of newborns from Australia have been interpreted as strong evidence that elasmarians bred and resided in high latitude conditions year-round rather than migrating north for part of the year, as had been assumed by some in the past.

== Palaeobiogeography ==
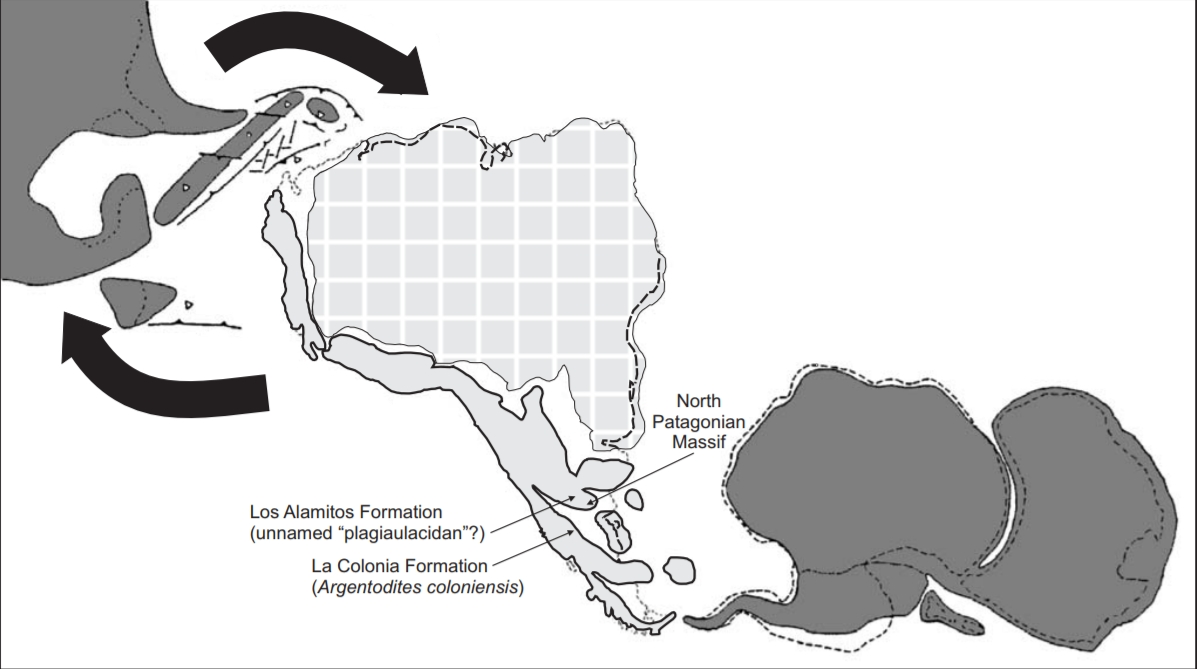
Proximity of the southern continents when Morrosaurus lived allowed faunal interchange

The biogeographic nature of dinosaur faunas in the Southern Hemisphere was traditionally unclear. It had long been clear that Gondwana, compromising the modern southern continents, had a distinct fauna from Laurasia, the northern ones. Less evident, however, were signs of connections between the dinosaurs between these southern continents that would signify unifying biogegraphic exchange. Those found in Brazil and North Africa were distinct from those in Patagonia, India and Madagascar, and each differed from those in Australia and Antarctica, which seemed more similar to one another. Some authors had also suggested the southern continents acted as a refugium of primitive animals that had declined elsewhere in the world. Flora and marine invertebrate fauna, contrastingly, showed clear links across southern Gondwana, contiguous through Patagonia, Antarctica, Australia, and New Zealand. Together they form what is termed the Weddelian Bioprovince.

Recognition of Antarctic taxa such as Morrosaurus and Trinisaura as being closely related to other elasmarians in South American demonstrated links between the dinosaurs on these continents. Later studies would expand the elasmarian group with Australian taxa as well as Kangnasaurus and Iyuku from Africa, expanding a distribution across Gondwana. Other groups of dinosaurs such as megaraptoran theropods, diamantinasaurian sauropods, and parankylosaurian ankylosaurs have more recently shown similar patterns of distribution. In particular, the dinosaurs of James Ross Island all appear to possess close relatives in the Patagonian region of South America. It is possible that, similar to what is seen with plants and marine reptiles, this terrestrial fauna extended to East Antarctica, Australia, and New Zealand, but Late Cretaceous fossils are incredibly sparse in these regions and their dinosaurian fauna remains largely unknown.

== See also ==
- South Polar region of the Cretaceous
- 2016 in paleontology
