= Patricia Vickers-Rich =

Australian palaeontologist and ornithologist

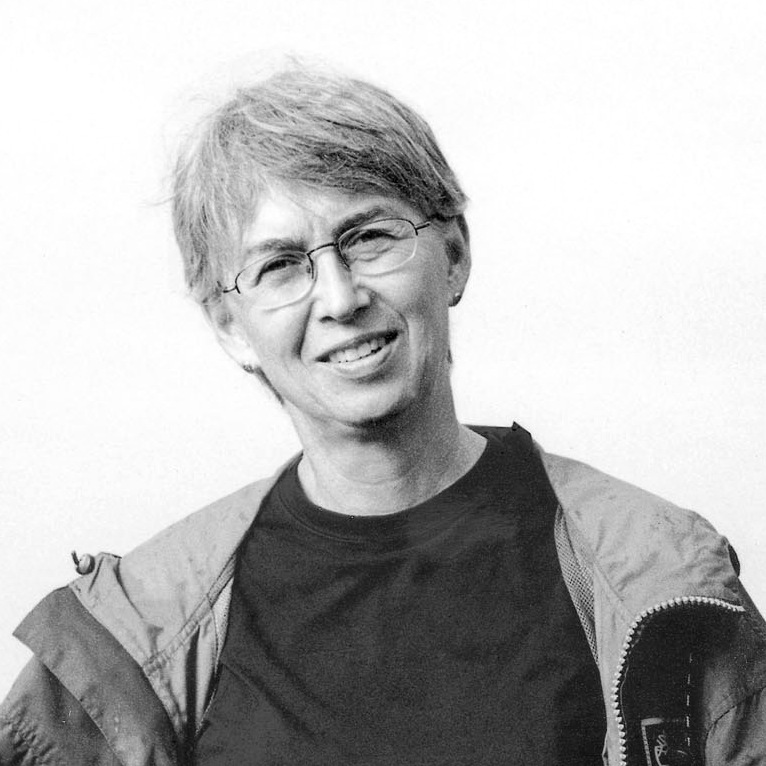
- Patricia Vickers-Rich in the field, 2021
- Born: July 11, 1944 (age 81); United States
- Known for: expert in the origin and evolution of Australasian vertebrates and their environments
- Spouse: Tom Rich
- Awards: Officer of the Order of Australia
- Scientific career
- Fields: Palaeontology and Palaeobiology

Patricia Arlene Vickers-Rich AO (born 11 July 1944), also known as Patricia Rich, is an Australian Professor of Palaeontology and Palaeobiology, who researches the environmental changes that have impacted Australia (including the ancient super continent, Gondwana) and how this shaped the evolution of Australia’s fauna and flora.

== Education ==
Vickers-Rich was born and educated in the United States. In her early career, she worked as a zooarchaeologist at the Nevada State Museum and research assistant in palaeontology while she obtained a Bachelor of Arts in paleontology at the University of Berkeley. She completed a Master of Arts in geology at Columbia University in 1969, and obtained a Doctorate of Philosophy from Columbia University in 1973.

== Career ==
Early in her career, Vickers-Rich worked as a field ecologist at the Organization of Tropical Studies in Costa Rica, as a palaeontologist at the American Museum of Natural History in New York, and as assistant professor and associate curator at the Texas Tech University and Museum.

In 1976, Vickers-Rich took up a position as lecturer in earth sciences at Monash University, Melbourne, Australia. During a long tenure, her significant roles at Monash University included deputy head of earth sciences and professor and personal chair of palaeontology, and currently as emeritus professor in palaeontology.

She was the founding director of the Monash Science Centre (now PrimeSCI! at Swinburne University of Technology), where she continues as a director. She is also a professor of palaeobiology at the Swinburne University of Technology, and associate professor in palaeontology at Deakin University.

In addition to her roles at Monash, between 1976 and 2021, Vickers-Rich has held positions as vice president and president of the Australian Association of Palaeonologists, research associate at the Queen Victoria Museum in Launceston, research associate in vertebrate palaeontology and ornithology at the Museums Victoria and research associate in the Laboratory of Precambrian Organisms at the Paleontological Institute in Moscow.

Vickers-Rich has curated scientific exhibitions of Australian and Gondwanan biota, including at Singapore Science Centre, ArtScience Museum and the Cape Otway Lightstation.

== Research ==
Vickers-Rich is an expert in the origin and evolution of Australasian vertebrates and their environments over the past 400 million years. She has special interest in Australian avian fossils, and has led research teams to investigate the origin and development of terrestrial vertebrates and birds around the world, including in Africa, Southeast Asia, South Pacific Islands, Antarctica, Russia, South America, and Saudi Arabia.

She, along with husband Tom Rich, has led a major effort since the 1970s to locate new fossil localities in her home state of Victoria, Australia. Together the couple described the dinosaur genera Leaellynasaura and Timimus, naming them after their daughter and son, Leaellyn and Tim Rich, respectively. Their field work in Victoria informs their research on interpreting changing climate and biogeographic affinity of the biota of Gondwana during the past 120 million years.

== Selected publications ==
- 1985 – Kadimakara: Extinct Vertebrates of Australia. Pioneer Design Studio. ISBN 978-0909674267
- 1987 – A Chinese-English and English-Chinese Dictionary of Vertebrate Palaeontology Terms. Monash University: Melbourne.
- 1989 – The Fossil Book: A Record of Prehistoric Life. (With Thomas Hewitt Rich, Mildred Adams Fenton and Carroll Lane Fenton). Doubleday. ISBN 0-385-19327-0
- 1991 – Vertebrate Palaeontology of Australia. (With J.M. Monaghan, R.F. Baird, and T.H. Rich (eds)). Monash University: Melbourne. ISBN 0-909674-36-1
- 1992 – Australia Long, Long Ago (The Southeast, Victoria): a Geological Story. (With Leaellyn Rich and Kerrie Auslebrook). Paleoscriptis: Melbourne.
- 1993 – Wildlife of Gondwana: Dinosaurs and Other Vertebrates from the Ancient Supercontinent. (With Thomas Hewitt Rich). Indiana University Press: Bloomington. ISBN 0-253-33643-0
- 1994 – The ICI Australia catalogue of the Great Russian Dinosaurs Exhibition 1993-1995. (With Thomas H. Rich). ICI Australia: North Melbourne. ISBN 0-7326-0503-2
- 1996 – Australia's Lost World: A History of Australia's Backboned Animals. (With Leaellyn Suzanne Rich and Thomas Hewitt Rich). Kangaroo Press: Sydney. ISBN 0-86417-798-4
- 1997 – Fossil collector's guide. (With J. Reid Macdonald, Mary Lee Macdonald, Leaellyn S. V. Rich, and Thomas H. Rich). Kangaroo Press: Sydney. ISBN 086417845X
- 2000 – Dinosaurs of Darkness. (With Thomas Hewitt Rich). Indiana University Press: Bloomington. ISBN 0-253-33773-9
- 2003 – A Century of Australian Dinosaurs. (With Thomas H. Rich). Queen Victoria Museum & Art Gallery Publications: Launceston. ISBN 0-9586203-6-9
- 2003 – Magnificent Mihirungs: The Colossal Flightless Birds of the Australian Dreamtime. (With Peter Murray). Indiana University Press: Bloomington. ISBN 0253342821
- 2007 – The Rise And Fall Of The Ediacaran Biota. (With P. Komarower). Geological Society, London, Special Publications, 286. ISBN 978-1-86239-233-5
- 2008 – The Rise of Animals: Evolution and Diversification of the Kingdom Animalia. (With Mikhail A. Fedonkin, James G. Gehling, Kathleen Grey and Guy M. Narbonne). Johns Hopkins Press. ISBN 0-8018-8679-1
- 2010 – The Artist and the Scientists: Bringing Prehistory to Life. (With Thomas Hewitt Rich and Peter Trusler). Cambridge University Press. ISBN 0-521-16299-8
- 2012 – The Flight: Boris S. Sokolov. Natural History and Paleontology in the Changing Landscape of 20th and Early 21st Century Russia. (with B. S. Sokolov) Paleontological Society of India, Lucknow.

== Awards and honours ==
In 2016, Vickers-Rich was awarded an Officer of the Order of Australia for distinguished service to the Earth Sciences, particularly palaeontology, as an academic, to education curriculum development, and to international scientific organisations.

Vickers-Rich's scientific literary works have attracted the Victorian Premier's Award for Science Writing (2007-2009) and Queensland Premier's Award for Science Writing (2007-2008) for The Rise of Animals; the Eureka Prize (1993 and 2000) for Wildlife of Gondwana and Dinosaurs of Darkness; Michael Daley Award for Excellence in Science Technology and Engineering Journalism (1993); and the Whitley Medal (1994 and 2004) for best book on the natural history of Australian animals for Wildlife of Gondwana and Magnificent Mihirungs. Additionally, Vickers-Rich is the recipient of the Roy Wheeler Medallion for Excellence in Field Ornithology (2005), the National Geographic/Toyota Field Vehicle Award (2002), Chairman's Award from the National Geographic Society (2000), the Crosbie Morrison Medal (1998), and she received the Key to the City of Mesa, Arizona, for the Great Russian Dinosaurs Exhibition (1995).

Vickers-Rich's work has gained her election to numerous prestigious organisations. In 2015 she was elected as a Bragg member of the Royal Institute of Australia, she was made a member of the Explorers Club, New York, in 1998, and elected a member of the International Academy of Sciences of Nature and Society Moscow Branch in 1996.
