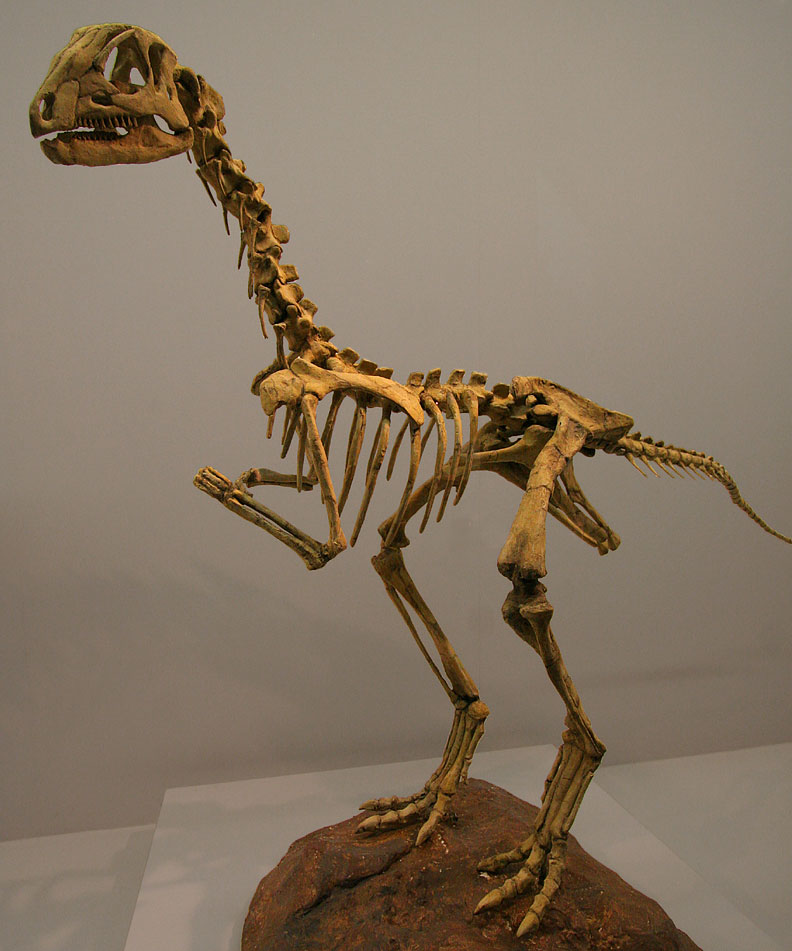
- Reconstructed skeleton cast

Scientific classification
- Domain: Eukaryota
- Kingdom: Animalia
- Phylum: Chordata
- Clade: Dinosauria
- Clade: †Ornithischia
- Clade: †Ornithopoda
- Clade: †Elasmaria
- Genus: †Anabisetia; Coria & Calvo, 2002
- Species: †A. saldiviai

Binomial name
- †Anabisetia saldiviai Coria & Calvo, 2002

= Anabisetia =

Anabisetia Temporal range: Late Cretaceous, 95–92 Ma

Extinct genus of dinosaurs

Anabisetia (/ˌɑːnəbiːˈsɛtiə/ AH-nə-bee-SET-ee-ə) is a genus of ornithopod dinosaur from the Late Cretaceous Period of Patagonia, South America. It was a small bipedal herbivore, around 2 metres (6 ft 7 in) long.

== Discovery ==
Argentine paleontologists Rodolfo Coria and Jorge Orlando Calvo named Anabisetia in 2002. The generic name honors the late Ana Maria Biset, an influential archeologist from Neuquén Province in Argentina, where the remains of this animal were found. The one named species is called A. saldiviai, after Roberto Saldivia Blanco, a local farmer who had discovered the fossils in 1985 and brought them to the attention of science in 1993. The finds had already been reported in the scientific literature in 1996.

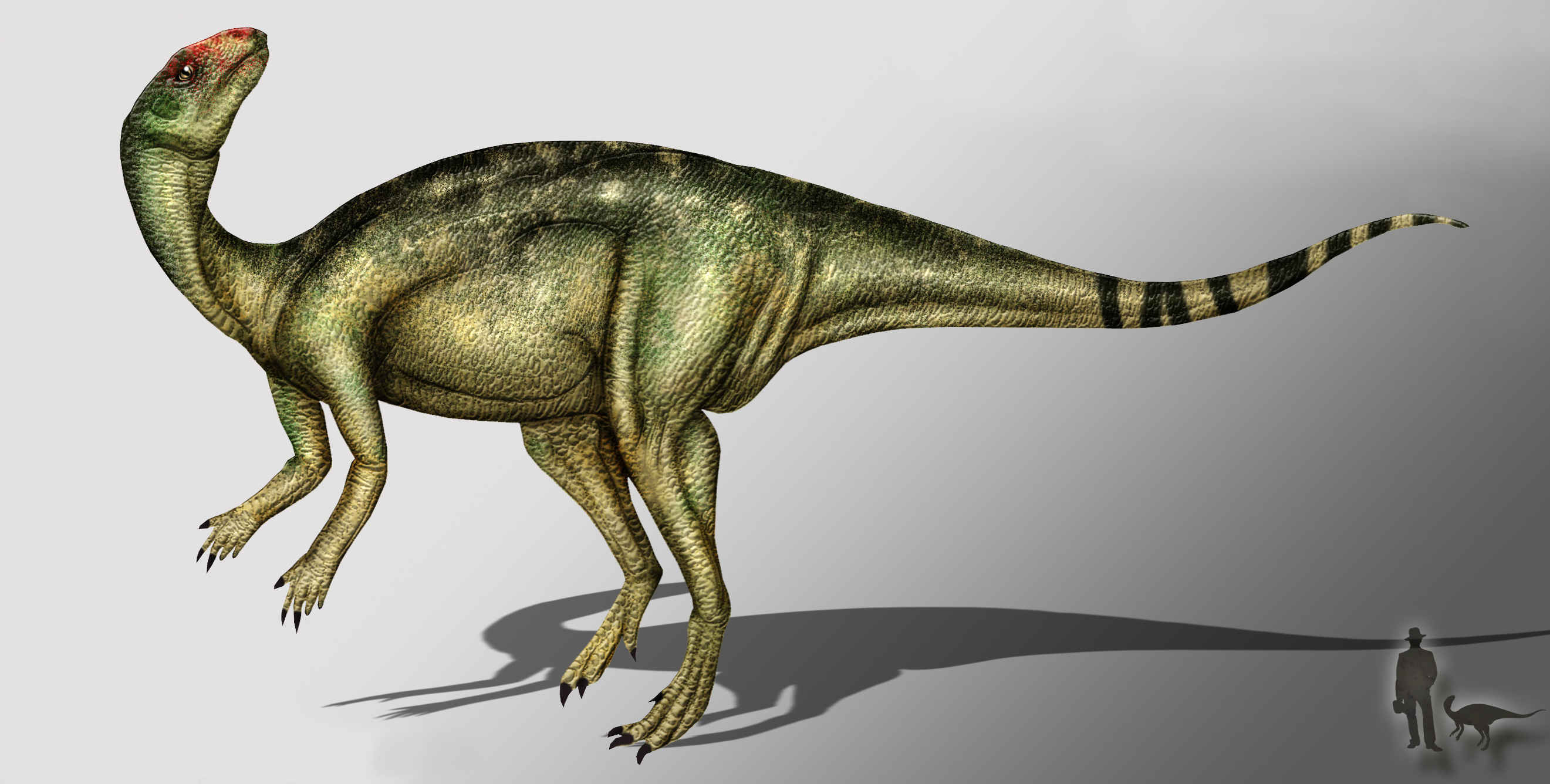
Artist's impression of Anabisetia

There are four specimens known, all listed in the original 2002 description. The holotype, MCF-PVPH 74, is the most complete of the four. It consists of fragmentary skull material, including a partial braincase and both dentary (lower jaw) bones, as well as a complete forelimb from shoulder to hand, a complete hindlimb and foot, and representative vertebrae from all sections of the spinal column. The other three specimens are less complete, but include elements not seen in the holotype, including more vertebrae, a complete pelvis and a nearly complete, articulated tail. Two specimens are the paratypes, MCF-PVPH-75 and MCF-PVPH-76. The fourth, MCF-PVPH-77, is referred to the species. When all four specimens are considered, the skeleton is more or less completely known except for the skull. These specimens are housed at the Museo Carmen Funes in Plaza Huincul, Argentina.

All four specimens were discovered at a locality called Cerro Bayo Mesa, thirty kilometers south of Plaza Huincul in the Neuquén province of Argentina. This locality is part of the Cerro Lisandro Formation, which is a geologic formation within the Rio Limay subgroup of the Neuquén Group. The sediments in this formation preserve a swamp which existed from the late Cenomanian through early Turonian stages of the Late Cretaceous Period, or about 95 to 92 million years ago.

== Description ==
Anabisetia was a small bipedal herbivore. In 2010 Gregory S. Paul estimated its length at two meters, its weight at twenty kilograms. The describers established several unique traits of the species. At the back of the head, the connection with the neck, the occipital condyle, pointed rather downwards. The shoulder blade had an extension on its upper lower rim, the acromial process, that relatively was the largest ever found in the Euornithopoda. In the hand the fifth metatarsal was flattened with straight edges, instead of rounded in cross-section. In the pelvis, the ilium had a front blade that accounted for more than half of the total ilium length and extended in front of the prepubis. The ischium had a shaft that in the upper part was triangular in cross-section and in the lower part quadrangular. In the ankle the fibula touched the astragalus.

== Classification ==
This dinosaur is thought to be closely related to another Patagonian ornithopod, Gasparinisaura, although the lack of skull material makes it difficult to place with precision. When originally described, Gasparinisaura and Anabisetia were thought to be basal iguanodontians, more derived than Tenontosaurus and members of the clade Euiguanodontia, and seen as endemic remnants of an early dispersion of basal iguanodontians on Pangea. Relatively recent cladistic analyses performed by Coria and others indicated that Gasparinisaura lies just outside of Iguanodontia, closer to North American ornithopods like Thescelosaurus and Parksosaurus. Anabisetia may fall in a similar position. However, in 2015, both taxa were found to be part of the clade Elasmaria along with other Antarctic and Patagonian ornithopods.

Cladogram based in the phylogenetic analysis of Rozadilla et al., 2015:

- - Hypsilophodon
  - - Thescelosaurus
    - Iguanodontia
      - Elasmaria
        - Gasparinisaura
        - - Morrosaurus
          - Trinisaura
          - Macrogryphosaurus
          - Notohypsilophodon
          - Talenkauen
          - Anabisetia
      - - Parksosaurus
        - - Kangnasaurus
          - - Rhabdodontidae
            - - Tenontosaurus
              - Dryomorpha
