= List of other ornithischian type specimens =

Specimens not in other lists

This list of other ornithischian type specimens is a list of fossils serving as the official standard-bearers for inclusion in the species and genera of the dinosaur clade Ornithischia that are not members of the clades Ornithopoda, Marginocephalia, or Thyreophora. These organisms include early ornithischians such as the heterodontosaurids and neornithischians such as thescelosaurids and jeholosaurids, close relatives of the ornithopods and marginocephalians. Type specimens are definitionally members of biological taxa and additional specimens can only be "referred" to these taxa if an expert deems them sufficiently similar to the type.

== The list ==
Species	Genus	Nickname	Catalogue Number	Institution	Age	Unit	Country	Notes	Images
Abrictosaurus consors	Abrictosaurus		NHMUK RU B54	Natural History Museum, London	Upper Triassic	Red Beds Formation, Stormberg Series	Lesotho		Holotype skull of Abrictosaurus consors
Agilisaurus louderbacki	Agilisaurus		ZDM T6011	Zigong Dinosaur Museum	Bajocian?	Lower Shaximiao Formation	China		
Albertadromeus syntarsus	Albertadromeus		TMP 2009.037.0044	Royal Tyrrell Museum of Palaeontology	Campanian	Oldman Formation	Canada		
Alocodon kuehnei	Alocodon		IPFUB P X 1		Oxfordian	Cabaços Formation	Portugal		Illustration of the holotype tooth of Alocodon kuehnei
Amtosaurus magnus	Amtosaurus		PIN 3780/2	Paleontological Institute of Russia	Cenomanian-Turonian	Baynshirenskaya Svita	Mongolia		
Brachypodosaurus gravis	Brachypodosaurus				Late Cretaceous		India	Nomen dubium	
Changchunsaurus parvus	Changchunsaurus		JLUM L0403-j–Zn2	Jilin University Geological Museum	Aptian–Cenomanian	Quantou Formation	China		
Claorhynchus trihedrus	Claorhynchus						United States	Nomen dubium	
Drinker nisti	Drinker		CPS 106	University of Colorado Museum of Natural History	Late Jurassic	Morrison Formation	United States	Junior synonym ofNanosaurus	
Echinodon becklesii	Echinodon		NHMUK 48209-48214	Natural History Museum, London	Lower Cretaceous	Purbeck Beds	United Kingdom	Syntypes	Syntype dentary of Echinodon becklesii
Eocursor parvus	Eocursor		SAM-PK-K8025	Iziko South African Museum	Norian?	Lower Elliot Formation	South Africa		
Fabrosaurus australis	Fabrosaurus		MNHN LES9	Muséum National d'Histoire Naturelle	Hettangian-Sinemurian	Upper Elliot Formation	Lesotho	Possibly a nomen dubium and referrable to Lesothosaurus	
Ferganocephale adenticulatum	Ferganocephale		ZIN PH 34/42	Zoological Institute, Russian Academy of Sciences	Callovian	Balabansai Svita	Kyrgyzstan	Possibly a nomen dubium	
Fruitadens haagarorum	Fruitadens		LACM 15747	Natural History Museum of Los Angeles County	Early Tithonian	Brushy Basin Member, Morrison Formation	United States		Holotype maxilla of Fruitadens haagarorum
Geranosaurus atavus	Geranosaurus		SAM-PK-K1871	Iziko South African Museum	Lower Jurassic	Clarens Formation	South Africa	Nomen dubium	Illustration of the holotype dentary of Geranosaurus atavus
Gongbusaurus shiyii	Gongbusaurus		IVPP 9069	Institute of Vertebrate Paleontology and Paleoanthropology	Late Jurassic	Xiaximiao Formation	China		
Gongbusaurus wucaiwanensis	Gongbusaurus		IVPP V8303	Institute of Vertebrate Paleontology and Paleoanthropology	Late Jurassic	Shishugou Formation	China		
Haya griva	Haya		IGM 100/2017	Institute of Geology, Mongolia	Late Cretaceous	Javkhlant Formation	Mongolia		
Heterodontosaurus tucki	Heterodontosaurus		SAM-PK-K337	Iziko South African Museum	Upper Triassic	Clarens Formation	South Africa		
Hexinlusaurus multidens	Hexinlusaurus		ZDM T6001	Zigong Dinosaur Museum	Bajocian?	Lower Shaximiao Formation	China		
Hypsilophodon foxii	Hypsilophodon		NHM R197	Natural History Museum, London	Late Barremian	Wealden Formation	United Kingdom		
Jeholosaurus shangyaunensis	Jeholosaurus		IVPP V 12529	Institute of Vertebrate Paleontology and Paleoanthropology	Early Cretaceous	Yixian Formation	China		
Koreanosaurus boseongensis	Koreanosaurus		KDRC-BB2	Korea Dinosaur Research Center	Late Cretaceous	Seonso Conglomerate	South Korea		Holotype of Koreanosaurus boseongensis
Kulindadromeus zabaikalicus	Kulindadromeus		INREC K3/109	Royal Belgian Institute of Natural Sciences	Middle-Late Jurassic	Ukureyskaya Formation	Russia		
Laosaurus celer	Laosaurus		YPM 1874	Peabody Museum of Natural History	Upper Jurassic	Morrison Formation	United States	Nomen dubium	
Laquintasaura venezuelae	Laquintasaura		MBLUZ P.1396	Museo de Biología de la Universidad del Zulia	Lower Jurassic	La Quinta Formation	Venezuela		
Leaellynasaura amicagraphica	Leaellynasaura		NMV P185991	Museums Victoria	Lower Albian	Eumeralla Formation	Australia		Holotype dentary of Leaellynasaura amicagraphica
Lesothosaurus diagnosticus	Lesothosaurus		NHMUK RUB17, RUB23, R11956	Natural History Museum, London	Lower Jurassic	Upper Elliot Formation	Lesotho		
Lycorhinus angustidens	Lycorhinus		SAM-PK-K3606	Iziko South African Museum	Lower Jurassic	Upper Elliot Formation	South Africa		Cast of the holotype of Lycorhinus angustidens
Manidens condorensis	Manidens		MPEF-PV 3211	Museo Paleontológico Egidio Feruglio	Aalenian–Early Bathonian	Cañadón Asfalto Formation	Argentina		
Nanosaurus agilis	Nanosaurus		YPM 1913a	Peabody Museum of Natural History	Upper Jurassic	Morrison Formation	United States		Type specimen of Nanosaurus agilis (left) and a cast of the type (right)
Nevadadromeus schmitti	Nevadadromeus				Cenomanian	Willow Tank Formation	United States		
Notoceratops bonarellii	Notoceratops			Museo de Ciencias Naturales, Universidad Nacional de San Juan	Santonian	Bajo Barreal Formation	Argentina	Type specimen is missing	
Orodromeus makelai	Orodromeus		MOR 294	Museum of the Rockies	Late Campanian?	Two Medicine Formation	United States		Holotype skeleton of Orodromeus makelai
Oryctodromeus cubicularis	Oryctodromeus		MOR 1636a	Museum of the Rockies	Mid-Cretaceous	Blackleaf Formation	United States		
Parksosaurus warreni	Parksosaurus		ROM 804	Royal Ontario Museum	Campanian-Maastrichtian	Horseshoe Canyon Formation	Canada		
Pegomastax africana	Pegomastax		SAM-PK-K10488	Iziko South African Museum	Hettangian-Sinemurian	Elliot Formation	South Africa		Holotype of Pegomastax africana
Peishansaurus philemys	Peishansaurus				Campanian-Maastrichtian	Minhe Formation	China	Possibly an indeterminate thyreophoran	
Sanxiasaurus modaoxiensis	Sanxiasaurus		CLGPR V00003	Chongqing Laboratory of Geoheritage Protection and Research	Middle Jurassic	Xintiangou Formation	China		
Serendipaceratops arthurcclarkei	Serendipaceratops		NMV P186385	Museums Victoria	Early Cretaceous		Australia2		
Taveirosaurus costai	Taveirosaurus		CEGUNL-TV 10	Centro de Estudos Geológicos da Universidade Nova de Lisboa	Maastrichtian		Portugal		
Thescelosaurus assiniboiensis	Thescelosaurus		RSM P 1225.1	Royal Saskatchewan Museum	Maastrichtian	Frenchman Formation	Canada		
Thescelosaurus garbanii	Thescelosaurus		LACM 33542	Natural History Museum of Los Angeles County	Maastrichtian	Hell Creek Formation	United States		
Thescelosaurus neglectus	Thescelosaurus		USNM 7757	National Museum of Natural History	Upper Cretaceous	Lance Formation	United States		Reconstructed holotype skeleton of Thescelosaurus neglectus
Tianyulong confuciusi	Tianyulong		STMN 26-3	Shandong Tianyu Museum of Nature	Early Cretaceous	Jehol Group	China		Holotype specimen of Tianyulong confuciusi
Trimucrodon cuneatus	Trimucrodon				Late Jurassic	Lourinhã Formation	Portugal		
Xiaosaurus dashanpensis	Xiaosaurus		IVPP V.6730A	Institute of Vertebrate Paleontology and Paleoanthropology	Bajocian?	Lower Shaximiao Formation	China		
Yandusaurus hongheensis	Yandusaurus		GCC V20501	Museum of the Chengdu University of Technology	Oxfordian	Shaximiao Formation	China		
Zephyrosaurus schaffi	Zephyrosaurus		MCZ 4392	Museum of Comparative Zoology	Late Aptian		United States		

== See also ==
- List of non-avian theropod type specimens
- List of ornithopod type specimens
- List of marginocephalian type specimens
- List of thyreophoran type specimens
- List of Mesozoic birds
