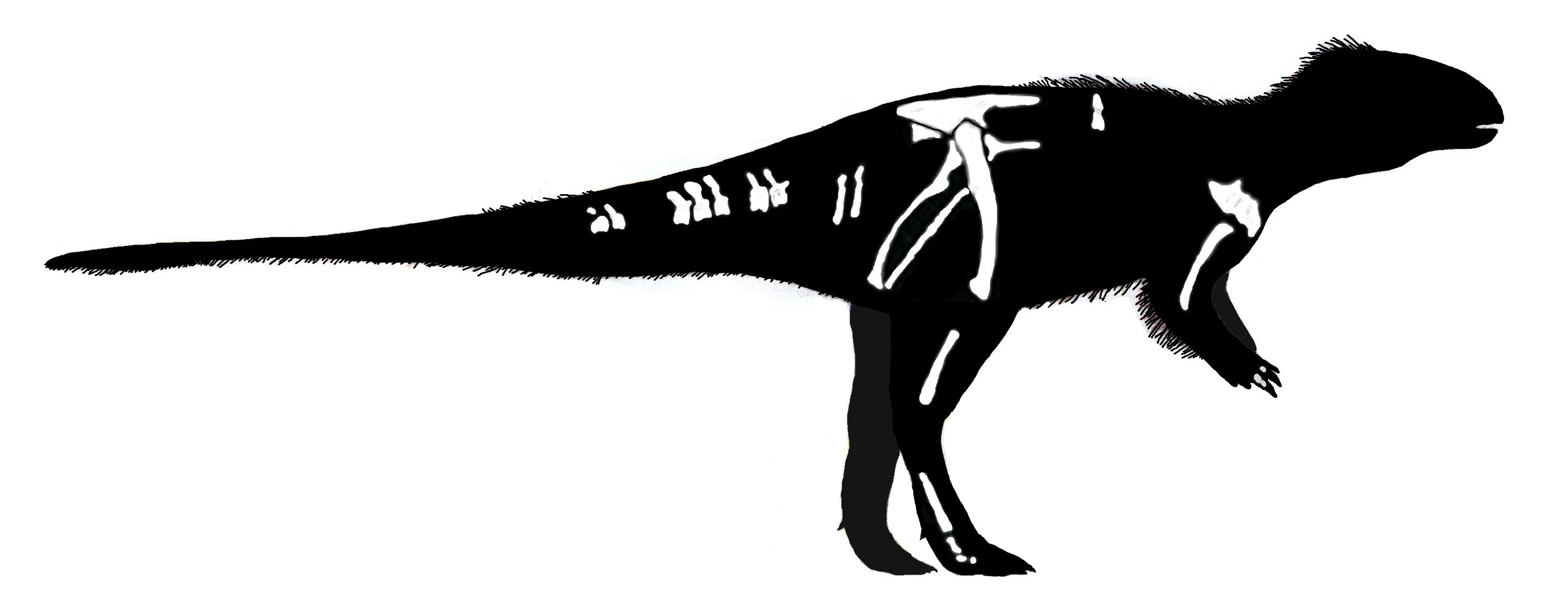
- Skeletal reconstruction of the holotype

Scientific classification
- Kingdom: Animalia
- Phylum: Chordata
- Class: Reptilia
- Clade: Dinosauria
- Clade: †Ornithischia
- Clade: †Ornithopoda
- Clade: †Elasmaria
- Genus: †Trinisaura; Coria et al., 2013
- Species: †T. santamartaensis

Binomial name
- †Trinisaura santamartaensis Coria et al., 2013

= Trinisaura =

Trinisaura Temporal range: Late Campanian ~73.4 Ma

Extinct genus of dinosaurs

Trinisaura is a genus of ornithopod dinosaur that lived during the late Campanian stage of the Upper Cretaceous, around 73 million years ago in what is now James Ross Island off the coast of northern Antarctica near Patagonia. It is known from a single, incomplete postcranial skeleton that includes several vertebrae, a partial pelvis, and nearly complete right hindlimb. The fossils were collected in 2008 by paleontologists Juan Moly and Rodolfo Coria from the sandstone of the Snow Hill Island Formation. It remained undescribed in the collections of the Museo de La Plata until its description by Coria and colleagues in 2013, being the basis of the novel genus and species Trinisaura santamartaensis. The genus name is to commemorate the efforts of Argentine geologist Trinidad "Trini" Diaz and the Latin root -sauros, meaning "lizard". The species name is after Santa Marta Cove, where the fossils were collected.

Trinisaura has been classified as a basal (early-diverging or "primitive") member of the clade Ornithopoda along with other ornithischians that had lived in the former supercontinent of Gondwana, which lived during the Cretaceous. Its only known skeleton comes from a subadult, with a small size of 1.5 metres (4.9 ft). Trinisaura was very lightly built and bipedal, with long legs built for running and a rigid tail to aid in balance during locomotion. Trinisaura is distinct from its relatives in a variety of ways, such as the shape of the ischium (back pelvic bone) and a large deltopectoral crest on the humerus (upper arm bone). Trinisaura is also noted to have a slower growth rate than genera that lived in warmer climates, an adaptation to colder temperatures of the Antarctic.

During Trinisaura's existence, Antarctica had just recently broken off from the rest of Gondwana, causing it to evolve distinct traits due to geographic isolation. It was found in the lower layers of the Gamma Member of the Snow Hill Island Formation, which preserves only one other named dinosaur, the ankylosaur Antarctopelta, in addition to a variety of aquatic animals like sharks and cephalopods. The climate during the Upper Cretaceous was much warmer than it is today, and the continent was blanketed in forests.

== Discovery and naming ==
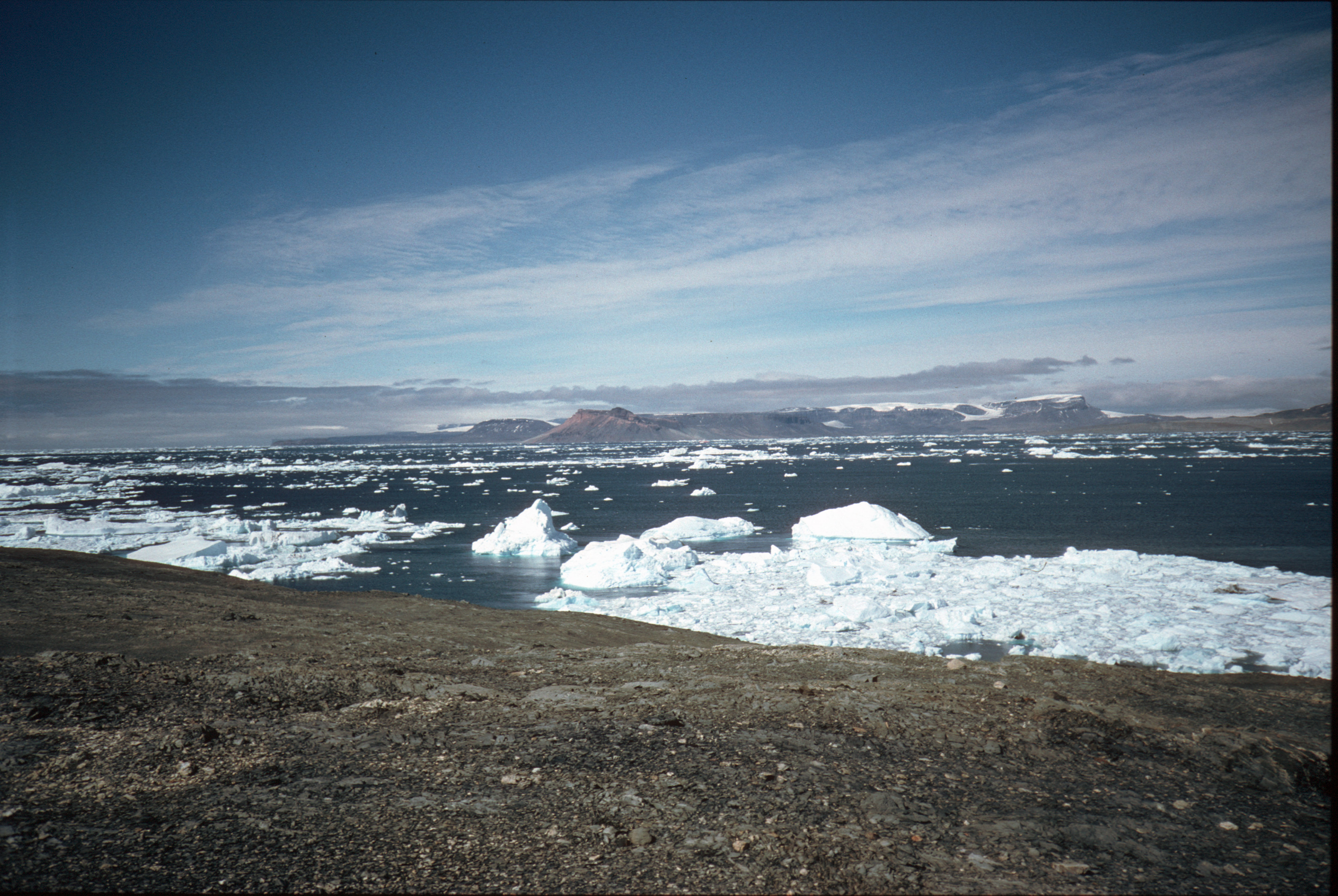
Image of James Ross Island, where Trinisaura's fossils were discovered

Fossils of Trinisaura were first collected in 2008 by Juan Moly and Rodolfo Coria, members of the Antarctic Summer Campaign that had been mounted by Instituto Antártico Argentino to the fossiliferous exposures of the Santa Marta Cove on James Ross Island, Antarctica. The layers date to the Upper Campanian stage of the Late Cretaceous, approximately at least 73.4 million years ago, coming from the base sandstone deriving from the Gamma Member of the Snow Hill Island Formation. During prior field visits in 1986, material of the dinosaur genus Antarctopelta and fragmentary fossils of a sauropod. The fossils come from a small ornithopod, consisting of a semi-articulated partial skeleton including several vertebrae (backbones), incomplete pelvis, fragmentary scapulacoracoid, right humerus, and a partial right hindlimb. Later, however, more fossils including the left scapulacoracoid and additional vertebrae were noted to be known in 2019. The ornithopod specimen was then deposited at the Museo de La Plata under catalogue number MLP-III-1-1, later the holotype, and briefly described by Coria et al. (2008), but received a complete description in 2013.

An Argentine team led by Coria described the fossils as a new genus and species of basal ornithopod dinosaur named Trinisaura santamartaensis, the generic name after geologist Trinidad "Trini" Diaz and the -saura root from the Latin word for "lizard", a commonly used epithet for dinosaurs. The specific name is after the geographic location of the holotype's discovery in the Santa Marta Cove. Several other indeterminate ornithopod remains have been described from the Snow Hill Formation, including the well preserved partial skeleton of an ornithopod from Vega Island which bears similarities to Trinisaura. The much larger Morrosaurus, named in 2016, has been suggested to be a junior synonym of Trinisaura, though several characteristics differentiate the two genera. Isolated unguals in addition to a tibia and astragalus coming from larger, unnamed ornithopods have also been described from the Snow Hill Formation of James Ross Island.

== Phylogeny ==
Trinisaura was originally found to be an indeterminate basal ornithopod related to the genera Gasparinisaura and Talenkauen, though this phylogenetic analysis was small in scope compared to other papers. Later phylogenetic analyses have found Trinisaura within the clade Elasmaria, a group of small to medium-sized herbivorous ornithopods characterized by their lithe builds and bipedal posture. They also were herbivores with rounded heads and tiny beaks in conjugation with teeth. Elasmarians were the sister group to the clade Clypeodonta, which consists of iguanodontians and hypsilophodonts according to Herne et al. (2019). In this group, many of the Gondwanan ornithopods, including the contemporary Morrosaurus, are found in and diagnosed by several traits in the postcranial anatomy. However, a 2022 phylogenetic analysis by Karen Poole of the ornithischian groups Iguanodontia and basal Neornithischia found no Elasmaria clade, instead with Trinisaura in a branch of Rhabdodontoidea containing the Patagonian genera Talenkauen and Anabisetia and the South African genus Kangnasaurus. It was theorized by Poole (2022) that this group of Gondwanan genera branched off from the ancestors of Rhabdodontidae 145 million years ago during the Late Jurassic, which overlaps with the separation of Laurasia from Gondwana via the North Atlantic Ocean.

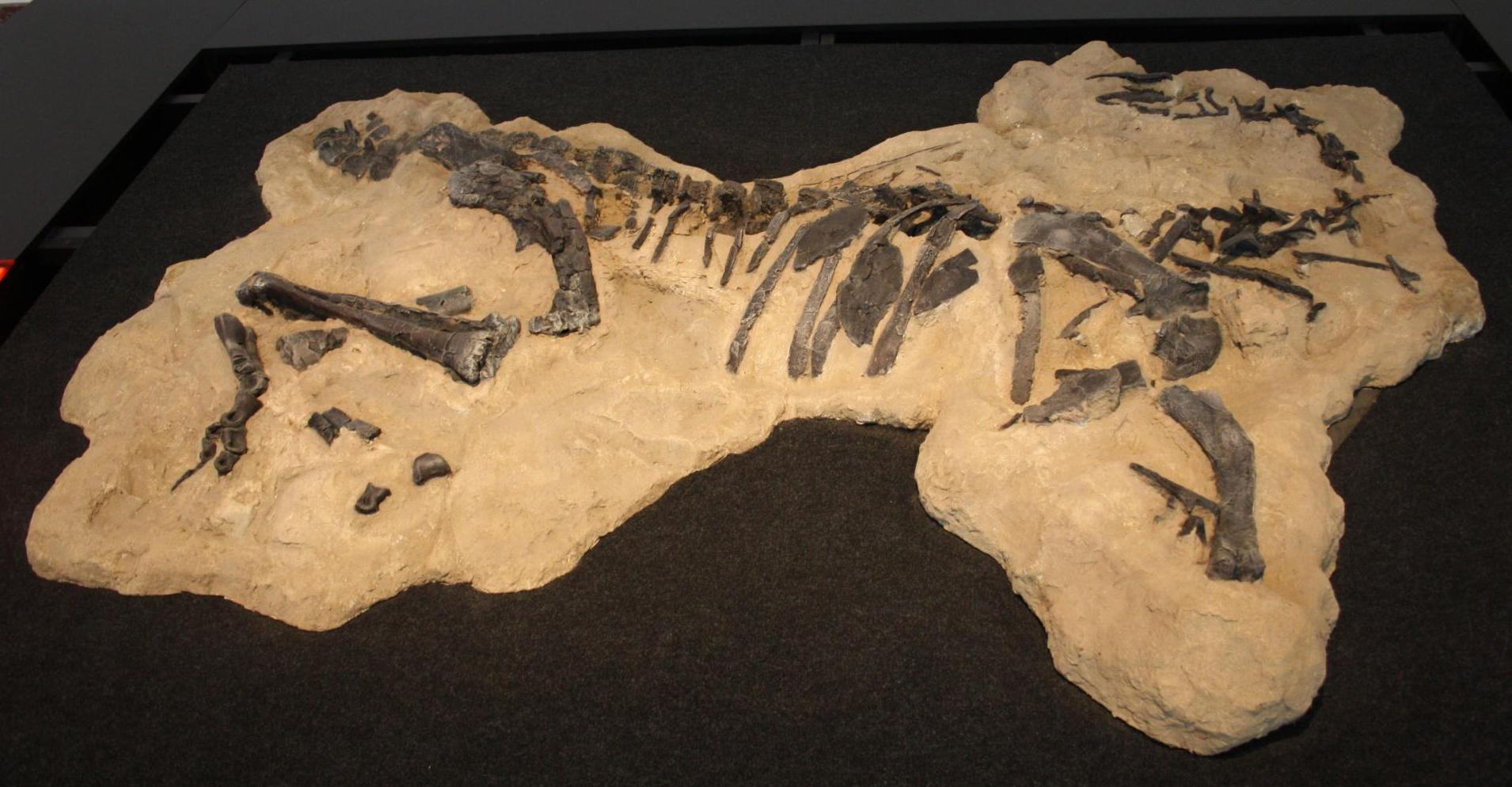
Skeleton of the closely related Talenkauen, a genus from Patagonia

In 2015, it along with several other Patagonian and Antarctic ornithopods was found to be a part of the basal group of iguanodonts, Elasmaria in polytomy with other South American ornithopods and Morrosaurus.

Cladogram based in the phylogenetic analysis of Rozadilla et al. (2015):

- - Hypsilophodon
  - - Thescelosaurus
    - Iguanodontia
      - Elasmaria
        - Gasparinisaura
        - - Morrosaurus
          - Trinisaura
          - Macrogryphosaurus
          - Notohypsilophodon
          - Talenkauen
          - Anabisetia
      - - Parksosaurus
        - - Kangnasaurus
          - - Rhabdodontidae
            - - Tenontosaurus
              - Dryomorpha

In 2022, Karen Poole recovered it along with the Patagonian ornithopods Anabisetia and Talenkauen and Kangnasaurus from South Africa in their own clade at the base of the Rhabdodontoidea, instead of in the Elasmaria. All of these taxa were from the supercontinent Gondwana, but while Talenkauen, Anabisetia and Trinisaura all come from the Upper Cretaceous, Kangnasaurus dates to the earlier part of the period. Below is her phylogenetic hypothesis.

- Stormbergia
- Neornithischia
  - - Agilisaurus
    - Hexinlusaurus
  - Clypeodonta
    - - Nanosaurus
      - - - Jeholosaurus
          - Haya
        - - Hypsilophodontidae
          - Thescelosauridae
    - Iguanodontia
      - Rhabdodontoidea
        - - Kangnasaurus
          - - Anabisetia
            - - Talenkauen
              - Trinisaura
        - - - - Tenontosaurus
              - Muttaburrasaurus
            - Rhabdodontidae
              - Rhabdodon
              - Zalmoxes
      - Dryomorpha
        - Dryosauridae
        - - Ankylopollexia

== Description ==
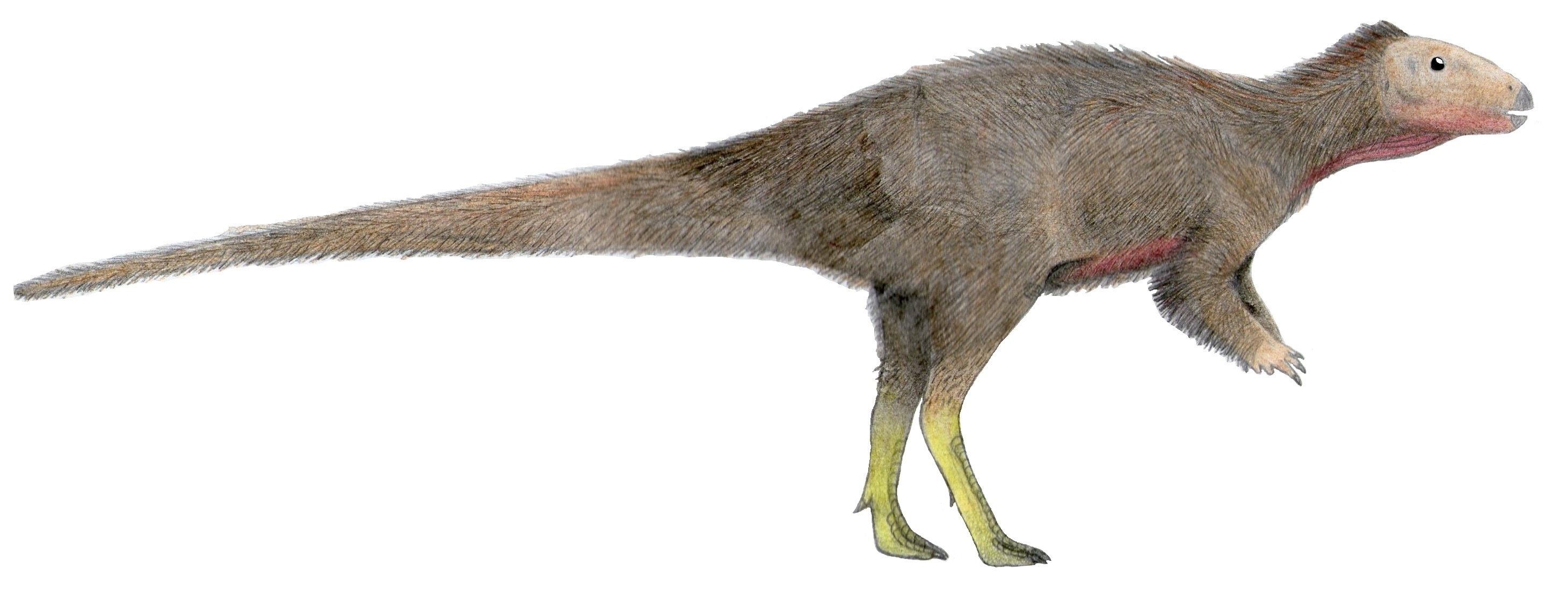
Speculative life restoration

Trinisaura is known from only a partial postcranial skeleton, leaving much of its skeletal anatomy unknown, and is from an immature individual. The size of the only specimen was estimated to be a mere 1.5 metres (4.9 ft) in length, placing it on the lower end of ornithopod sizes. This is much smaller than the only other named Antarctic ornithopod, Morrosaurus, which was around 4 metres (13 ft) long, differentiating the two in this aspect. Based on the phylogenetic position of the genus within Elasmaria and the known material, Trinisaura was herbivorous, lightly built, with a long tail for balance in addition to lithe hindlimbs and short forelimbs. The dorsum was short with an avian sternum and the neck was elongated, terminating in a small, beaked skull adapted for herbivory.

=== Vertebrae and pectoral girdle ===
The vertebral column is incompletely known, with only single, partial dorsal (trunk) vertebra, three sacral (pelvic) centra, seven caudal (tail) vertebrae, and a haemal arch of a chevron (a bone attached to the underside of the tail vertebrae) described from the column. However, several additional undescribed vertebrae exist. The dorsal vertebra is incomplete, lacking the neural spine and most of the physes, though the postzygapophyses are short and angle posteriorly. The lateral sides of the centrum are concave and bear small foramina (small, hollow pits in bone), with a ventral keel on the bottom of the centrum. The sacral centra provide little information as well, but have a similar shallow concavity. The caudal vertebrae are better preserved, with posteriorly-projected neural spines, well-developed transverse processes, and a thick prespinal lamina. The prezygapophyses are small and have an anterodorsally projected condition. The mid-caudal vertebrae are morphologically akin to other ornithopods as the transverse processes are not expanded distally. The distal caudals have dwarfed transverse processes, lower neural arches, and proportionally elongated centra. The haemal arch is compressed transversely and distally, though it is slightly expanded anteroposteriorly at the end.

The right scapulacoracoid (breastbone) is incomplete and consists only of the proximal end, though it is noted that the scapula and coracoid are firmly fused. The acromial process (process making up the lateral edge of the shoulder joint) is spike-like, with a strong, sharp lateral crest that distinguishes it from other ornithopods, though a similar condition is found in the Australian genus Fostoria. The scapular blade is only known from fragments, but is dorsoventrally narrow and much of it articulates with the glenoid surface. Here, the scapulacoracoid touches the humerus (upper arm bone). The humerus is fragmentary, missing the proximal and distal ends, but is gracile and laterally bowed. When complete, the proximal end would be enlarged transversely whereas the distal end would have two large condyles (articulation points). Two metacarpals from the end were also found with the holotype, bearing an elongate morphology with convex dorsal sides and flat ventral sides. The tendon (tissue that connects to bone) attachments would connect to deep, lateral pits divided by medial grooves.

=== Pelvis and hindlimb ===
The pelvis is incomplete, with both ilia, the right pubis, and right ischium described; the left pubis and ischium are missing. The ilium is slender, low, and elongate, a trait shared with most other basal ornithopods, with a dorsally sigmoid outline. The preacetabular process is large and makes up 50% of the iliar length and is tall, almost as tall as the pubic peduncle. The sides are flat but concave in cross-section to connect with the sacral ribs. The postacetabular process is robust and thick transversely with a concave brevis shelf. The pubis is slender and longer than the ischium, with a rod-like prepubic process that is rod-like and thin transversely. The ischium is unique compared to other elasmarians, with a slight curve along its entire length that is an example of convergent evolution with marginocephalians, the group that contains families like ceratopsids and pachycephalosaurids. The ischium's pubic process is square in shape and thin transversely. The ischium overall is fragile and thinly built, as in some other dinosaurs.

The right femur, distal right tibia, distal right metatarsal III, first phalanx of digit III, and phalanges II and III of digit IV are known from Trinisaura. The right femur is the most robust of the limb elements, with a thick shaft and wide expansions at the proximal and distal ends for articulation with the pelvis and tibia. The trochanters are well developed for muscle attachment, the fourth trochanter specifically being pendant as in other basal ornithopods. The distal end is poorly preserved, but does display the intercondylar groove used for articulation with the tibia, which is more shallow than other ornithopods like Anabisetia. The lateral (fibular) condyle extends more laterally in contrast to the medial (tibial) one, which is wider. The tibia is bowed laterally and has a transversely expanded distal end, with a shallow groove extending across its face. The metatarsus has a wide shaft transversely and is flattened and was wedged between the metatarsals II and IV for most of its length, a characteristic evident in Anabisetia as well. The phalanges are robust and bear pits for tendon connections.

== Palaeobiology ==
Based on the hindlimb anatomy of Trinisaura and other elasmarians, notably the slim metatarsus, it is thought they were very capable runners, distinguishing them from other herbivorous dinosaurs they lived alongside. The expanded chevrons of Trinisaura in addition to ossified intercortal plates along the bottom of the torso preserved in related taxa would have further aided their cursorial abilities by improving tail balance and musculature control as well as breathing efficiency. This developed tail musculature and running ability of elasmarians is noted as more developed in elasmarian taxa than in other ornithopods such as Hypsilophodon.

In 2020, a study was conducted on the growth rate of Trinisaura, and its relative Morrosaurus, through use of histological study of thin samples from the holotype long bones and third metatarsal. Ornithischian dinosaurs living in polar regions in the Northern Hemisphere (such as Edmontosaurus and Pachyrhinosaurus typically show different growth rates than relatives from lower latitudes, owing to the extreme temperatures of their environments, but studies have failed to find the same signs in Antarctic animals. The study confirmed this pattern in elasmarians, with comparison to the South American elasmarian Gasparinisaura finding incredibly similar histology to the Antarctic genera. All three show rapid growth with periodic interruptions, variation in growth marks, and changes in growth rate across their life cycle, growing slower as they aged. Similar growth strategies are reported in other ornithopods from much lower latitudes. This indicates that rather than adapting their growth physiology in response to the cold, southern environments they lived in, elasmarians were able to succeed in such ecosystems due to the existing possession of necessary adaptations to thrive there. A higher growth rate was noted in Morrosaurus as compared to Trinisaura, consistent with it being a larger species. Additionally, it was found the animals reached their sexual maturity well before their skeletal maturity, and ceased growth at a later point, consistent with other dinosaurs.

== Palaeobiogeography ==
Location of James Ross Island, where Trinisaura is known

The discovery of Trinisaura was concurrent with the first evidence of a previously hypothesized uniting clade of ornithopod dinosaurs from the continents that had comprised Gondwana. The northern supercontinent Laurasia had a separate, distinct dinosaur fauna than Gondwana, but evidence was traditionally lacking for a biogeographic link between dinosaurs on different Gondwanan regions. Brazil and northern Africa shared a fauna distinct from that of Patagonia, and each of these distinct from that of India and Madagascar; likewise, Australia, New Zealand, and Antarctic seemed connected to the exclusion of the others. This contrasted with existing recognition of links between the flora and marine invertebrate fauna found in Patagonia, Antarctica, Australia, and New Zealand, termed the Weddellian Bioprovince.

The recognition of Morrosaurus and Trinisaura as Antarctic elasmarians closely related to animals from South America constituted important evidence of such ties existing in dinosaurs on these continents as well. This was bolstered by later studies producing firmer evidence of Australian ornithopods as also belonging to the group, as well as possibly Kangnasaurus from Africa. Similar biogeographic patterns have been observed in megaraptoran theropods, diamantinasaurian sauropods, and parankylosaurian ankylosaurs. These discoveries of connected endemic Gondwanan ecosystems have overturned the traditional view of the southern continents, acting as a refugium for animals more successful elsewhere earlier in the Cretaceous.

== Paleoenvironment ==
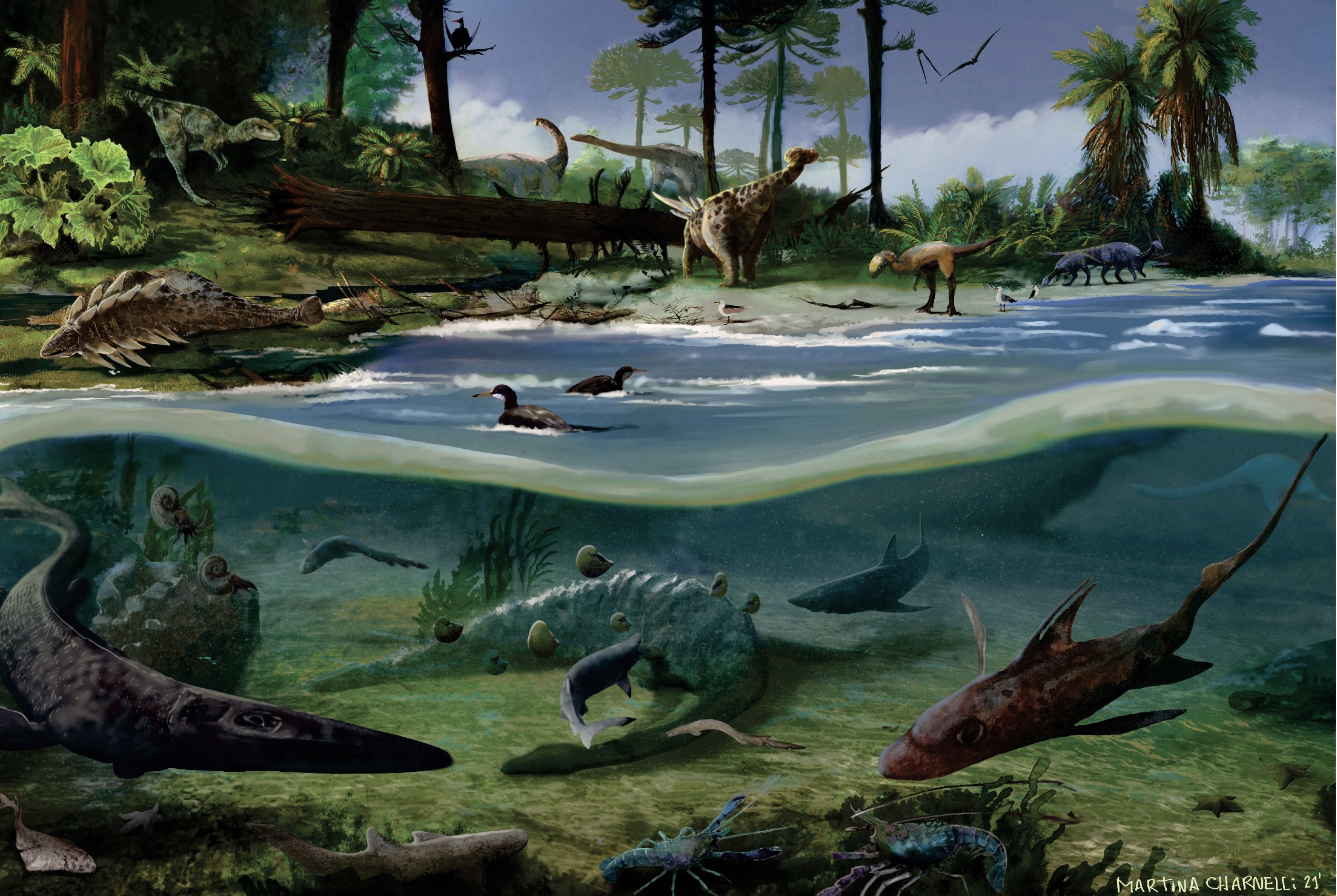
Reconstruction of the Snow Hill Island Formation's flora and fauna, with Trinisaura in the back foreground

Trinisaura is known solely from the Gamma Member of the Snow Hill Island Formation in James Ross Island, an island in the James Ross Island group on the northeastern edge of the Antarctic Peninsula. The Snow Hill Island Formation one of only two major dinosaur-bearing rock formations found on Antarctica, bearing all but two of the continent's named dinosaurs. The floral composition, habitat, and climate are of one similar to modern volcanic arches. The formation preserves a variety of habitats, such as riverine deposits (pond, river margin) and drier ones (interfluve, canopy gaps). A mean annual climate of 10–15 °C (50–59 °F) has been calculated.

Trinisaura's fossils bear some surface weathering and abrasion, which indicate that they went through minimal transport, reworking, and subaerial weathering. This is in contrast to the holotype of Antarctopelta, which likely floated out to sea and was buried by marine sediments on the ocean floor. This is due to the two taphonomic and depositional settings of the Snow Hill Island Formation, with Trinisaura found alongside other dinosaurs with little to no signs of scavenging; Trinisaura itself is clean of scavenging. In the Gamma Member, wood fragments, twigs, and leaves have been found in concretions from the locale, associated with dinosaur fossils like Trinisaura itself and apparently came with the same ocean currents that brought the dinosaur carcasses. From the Gamma Member, Asteraceae pollen grains were collected that are the oldest records of the family. Some of the environment may have been wet and similar to peat bogs, as evidenced by the presence of Sphagnaceae (peat mosses) and several other groups including the clubmoss Selaginella, the firmoss group Lycopodiaceae, and the clade Ericaceae. The Gamma Member of the formation has yielded several other fossil remains, such as the armored ankylosaur Antarctopelta, a vertebral centrum of a lithostrothian sauropod, an aquatic elasmosaurid, and the carnivorous tylosaurine mosasaurs Taniwhasaurus and Hainosaurus. As for fishes and chondrichthyes, the bony fish Enchodus and Apateodus, an indeterminate ichthyodectiformes, and several sharks such as Sphenodus, Cretalamna, and Notidanodon have all been collected. Shelled ammonites, a kind of aquatic, shelled cephalopod, are also found in the layers of the Gamma Member.
