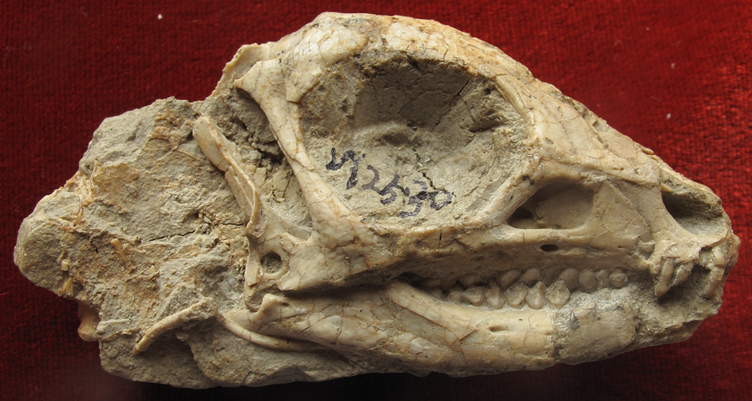
- Skull (IVPP V12530)

Scientific classification
- Kingdom: Animalia
- Phylum: Chordata
- Class: Reptilia
- Clade: Dinosauria
- Clade: †Ornithischia
- Clade: †Neornithischia
- Family: †Jeholosauridae
- Genus: †Jeholosaurus; Xu et al., 2000
- Species: †J. shangyuanensis

Binomial name
- †Jeholosaurus shangyuanensis Xu et al., 2000

= Jeholosaurus =

Jeholosaurus Temporal range: Early Cretaceous, 125.75–125.68 Ma

Extinct genus of dinosaurs

Jeholosaurus is a genus of small neornithischian dinosaur from the Early Cretaceous-aged Yixian Formation of what is now China.

== History of discovery ==
The first two Jeholosaurus specimens were found in 2000 at Lujiatun near Beipiao City, Liaoning Province, China, and named and described the same year by Xu Xing, Wang Xioalin and You Hailu. The type and only known species is Jeholosaurus shangyuanensis. The generic name Jeholosaurus means "lizard from Jehol"; Jehol is the name of a historical province situated in western Liaoning and northern Hebei. The specific name refers to the geographical area of Shangyuan where the fossil site is located.

The type specimen of Jeholosaurus, on which the genus is based, is IVPP V 12529. It was found in a layer of the early Yixian Formation, dating from the Barremian, about 126-124 million years old. The layers consist of fluvial sandstone interspersed with tuff and it is thought that an enormous volcanic eruption occurred burying everything within a fifty to sixty-mile radius. The holotype contains a compressed skull and a partial postcranial skeleton. The second specimen, IVPP V 12530, was referred to the species. It consists of a better preserved, perhaps smaller, skull and some neck vertebrae. Both specimens represent juvenile or at least subadult individuals. In 2009, 4 new well-preserved specimens were referred to Jeholosaurus: IVPP V15716, a partial skull; IVPP V15717, a complete skull; IVPP V15718, a complete skull; IVPP V15719, a partial skeleton. These specimens also have features of immaturity.

== Description ==
=== Size ===
Jeholosaurus was a small bipedal herbivore. Because the specimens are juvenile, it is hard to ascertain the adult size. The holotype is 71.1 centimetres (28.0 in) long with a 35.6 centimetres (14.0 in) long tail, nearly half the length of the complete animal. The length of the skull is 6.3 centimetres (2.5 in) and the lower jaws of the mandible are 5.9 centimetres (2.3 in) each. The forelimbs are 25.4 centimetres (10.0 in) long and the hindlimbs are 33 centimetres (13 in). The femur is 9 centimetres (3.5 in) long and the tibia is 10.7 centimetres (4.2 in).

=== Anatomy ===
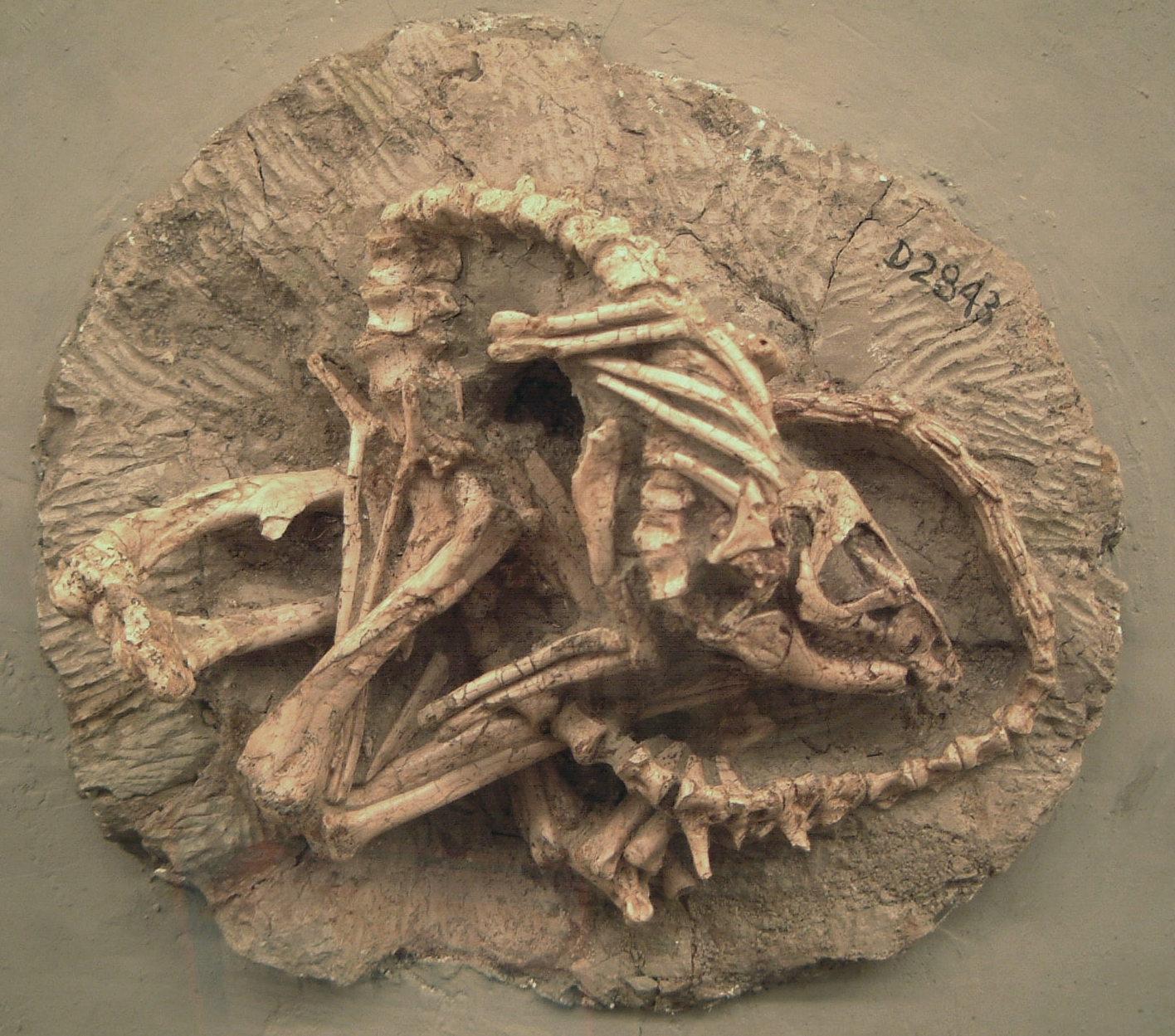
Skeleton of Jeholosaurus. The curled position raises the question as to whether this animal died in a burrow.

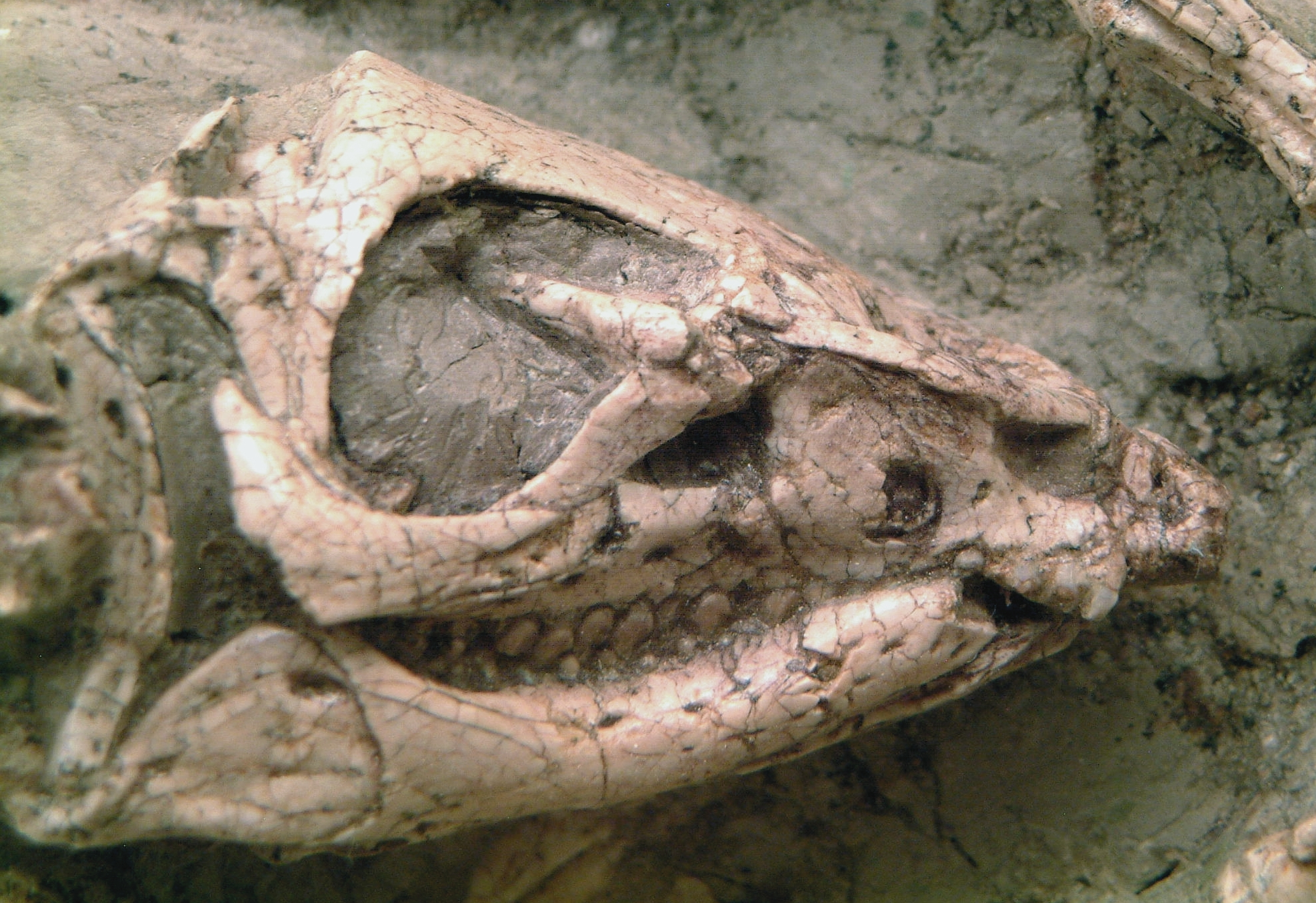
Skull of Jeholosaurus.

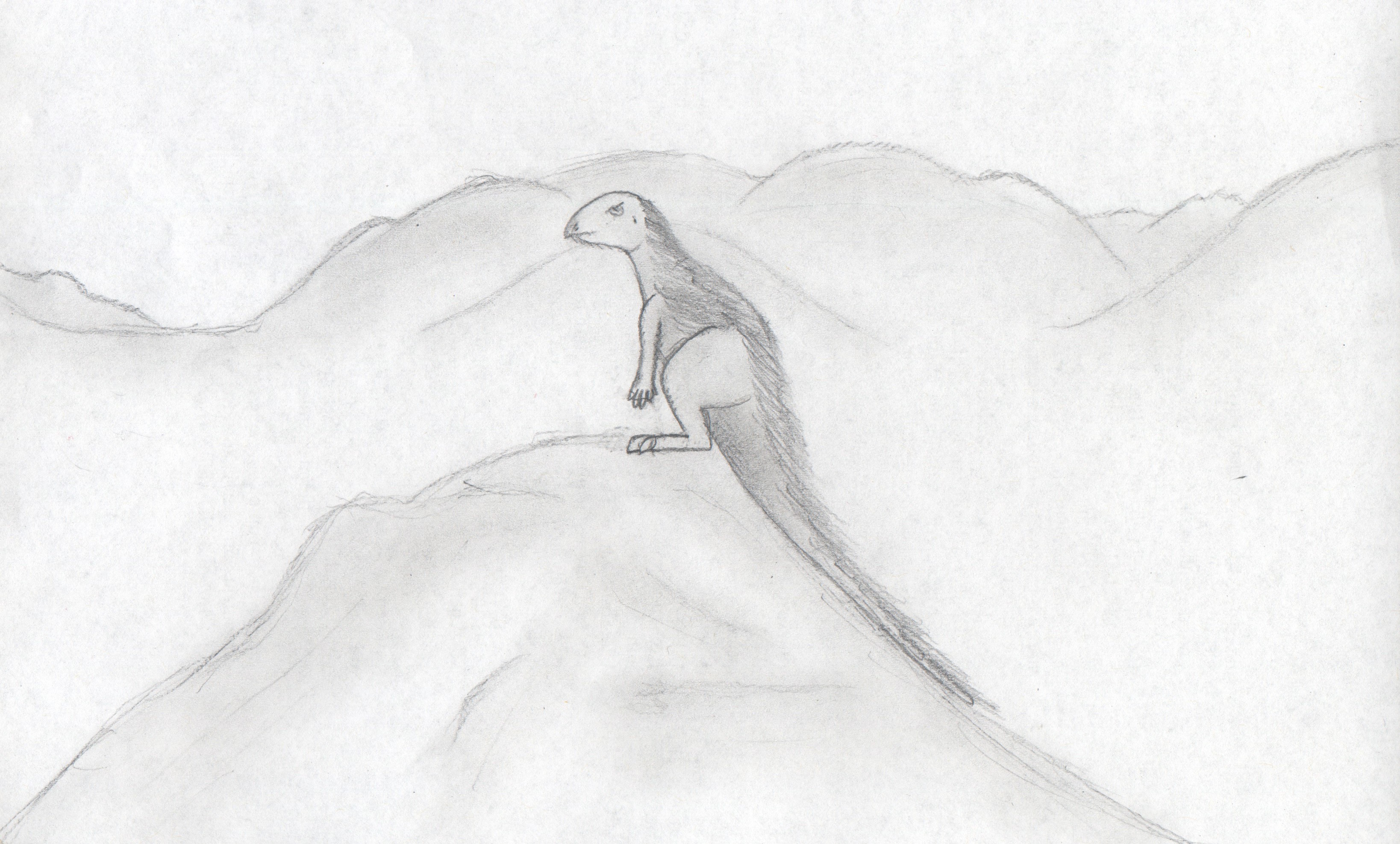
Restoration

Both skulls are incomplete and had to be partially restored. The referred specimen shows an extremely large orbit compared to the skull size, with a length of 40% of the total skull length. Its snout is short, also comprising 40% of the skull length. Both traits are indicative of a juvenile individual.

The premaxilla has six teeth and the maxilla has at least thirteen teeth. Although the back, maxillary, teeth are fan-shaped like those of a plant eater, the front premaxillary teeth are narrower and longer, more like a carnivorous dinosaur. This may mean that Jeholosaurus was omnivorous, eating both plants and animals. The deeply inset ventral margin of the maxilla suggests fleshy cheeks may have been present. The nasals have large foramina dorsolaterally and a midline fossa. No palpebrae are preserved. Though cervical vertebrae and caudal vertebrae have been preserved, their exact number is unknown. The femur is bowed and has an anterior trochanter slightly lower than the greater trochanter and a third as narrow as the latter. They are separated by a shallow cleft. Between the condyles of the lower femur, the (anterior) extensor groove is absent. The fourth trochanter is pendant and located in a rather high position. The foot has four metatarsals. The longest is metatarsal III, with a length of 5.5 centimetres (2.2 in); it is placed more anteriorly than the other metatarsals. Metatarsal I is more posterior and its upper part is transversely reduced to a splint.

Some distinguishing traits of Jeholosaurus include: a row of small foramina on the outer surface of the nasal immediately above the premaxillary articulation and parapophyses absent from dorsal vertebrae 1 and 2.

Jeholosaurus had a very rapid rate of maxillary tooth replacement at 46 days, more rapid than most basal ornithischians. As it developed ontogenetically, its premaxillary tooth replacement rate slowed from 25 days to 33 days.

== Phylogeny ==
Jeholosaurus is an ornithischian, as is shown by its ornithischian four-pronged pelvic structure with a pubis bone pointing downward and backwards, parallel to the ischium, while a forward-pointing prepubic process supports the abdomen.

The describers did not assign Jeholosaurus to any family, limiting themselves to a placement as Ornithischia incertae sedis. Using the comparative method, they pointed out some similarities to basal Euornithopoda: a small antorbital fenestra; the foramen on the quadratojugal; a large quadratic foramen; and the absence of an external fenestra in the lower jaw. However, they also noticed more derived euornithopod traits, such as the form of the greater and anterior trochanter of the thighbone, although the premaxilla not reaching the lacrimal, the high jaw joint and the premaxilla being on the same level as the maxilla, were again basal traits. The fused mandibular symphysis might indicate a relation with the Marginocephalia. Very basal ornithischian traits included the presence of six teeth in the premaxilla with only a short toothless sector in front and a short hiatus with the maxillary teeth.

Later cladistic analyses have recovered a basal position in the Ornithopoda. The following cladogram was based on analysis by Makovicky et al., 2011.

- Ornithischia
  - Pisanosaurus
  - - Heterodontosauridae
    - - Eocursor
      - Genasauria
        - Lesothosaurus
        - Thyreophora
        - Neornithischia
          - Stormbergia
          - - Agilisaurus
            - - Hexinlusaurus
              - Cerapoda
                - Marginocephalia
                - Ornithopoda
                  - Orodromeus
                  - - - Haya
                      - - Changchunsaurus
                        - Jeholosaurus
                    - - Hypsilophodon
                      - to Iguanodontia

Han et al. found a similar topology to that of Makovicky et al., 2011, in 2012, with a clade composed of Jeholosaurus, Haya, and Changchunsaurus. They named this clade Jeholosauridae.

The cladogram below results from analysis by Herne et al., 2019.

- Ornithischia
  - Heterodontosauridae
  - - Eocursor
    - - Thyreophora
      - Neornithischia
        - Lesothosaurus
        - - Agilisaurus
          - - - Hexinlusaurus
              - Yandusaurus
            - - - Nanosaurus
                - - Jeholosauridae
                    - Haya
                    - - Jeholosaurus
                      - Changchunsaurus
                  - Thescelosauridae
                    - - Orodromeus
                      - Koreanosaurus
                    - - Zephyrosaurus
                      - - Yueosaurus
                        - Thescelosaurus
              - Cerapoda
                - Marginocephalia
                - Ornithopoda
                  - Parksosaurus
                  - - Elasmaria
                      - Talenkauen
                      - - - Macrogryphosaurus
                          - Gasparinisaura
                        - - Galleonosaurus
                          - Leaellynasaura
                          - Anabisetia
                          - Diluvicursor
                    - Clypeodonta
                      - Hypsilophodon
                      - Iguanodontia
                        - Rhabdodontidae
                        - - Muttaburrasaurus
                          - - Tenontosaurus
                            - Dryomorpha
