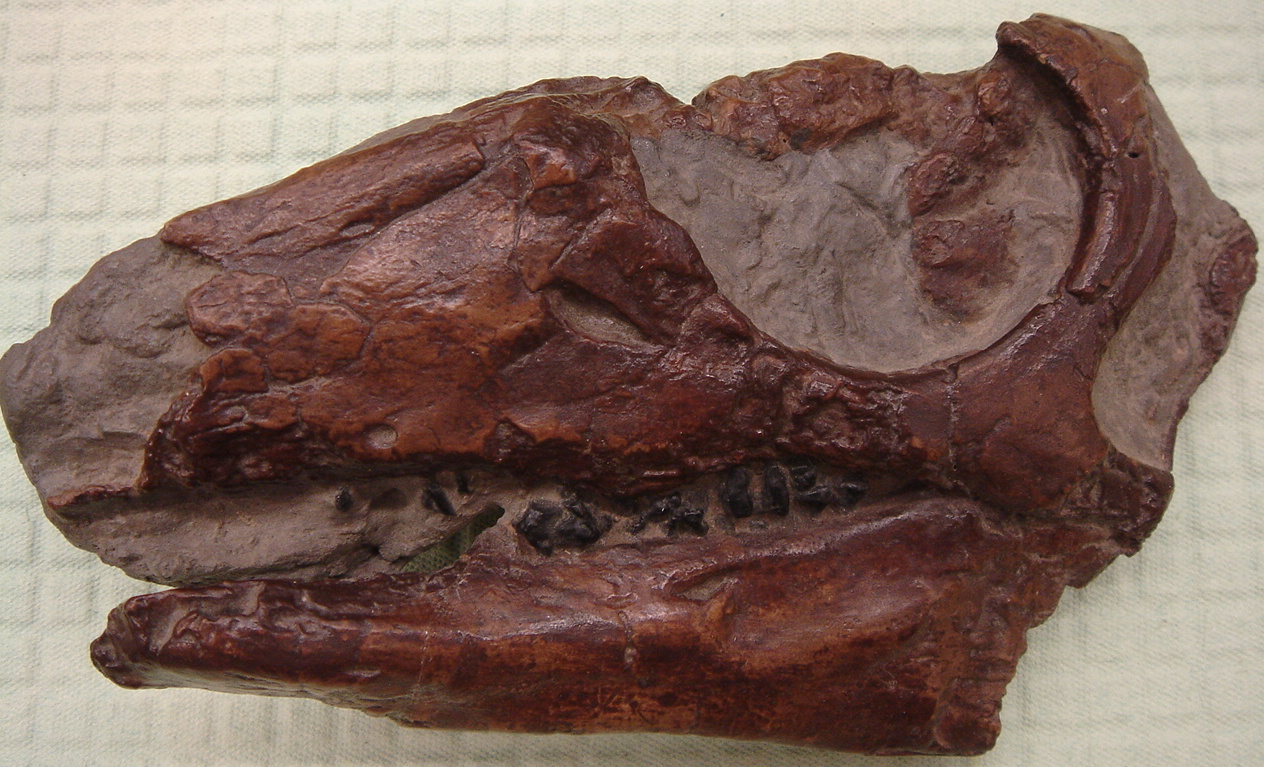
- Skull cast of Parksosaurus

Scientific classification
- Kingdom: Animalia
- Phylum: Chordata
- Class: Reptilia
- Clade: Dinosauria
- Clade: †Ornithischia
- Clade: †Pyrodontia
- Family: †Thescelosauridae
- Subfamily: †Thescelosaurinae
- Genus: †Parksosaurus; C. M. Sternberg, 1937
- Species: †P. warreni

Binomial name
- †Parksosaurus warreni (Parks, 1926 [originally Thescelosaurus])

Synonyms
- Thescelosaurus warreni Parks, 1926

= Parksosaurus =

Parksosaurus Temporal range: Late Cretaceous, 69.5 Ma

Extinct genus of dinosaurs

Parksosaurus (meaning "William Parks's lizard") is a genus of neornithischian dinosaur from the early Maastrichtian-aged (Upper Cretaceous) Horseshoe Canyon Formation of Alberta, Canada. It is based on most of a partially articulated skeleton and partial skull, showing it to have been a small, bipedal, herbivorous dinosaur. It is one of the few described non-hadrosaurid ornithopods from the end of the Cretaceous in North America, existing around 70 million years ago.

== Discovery and history ==
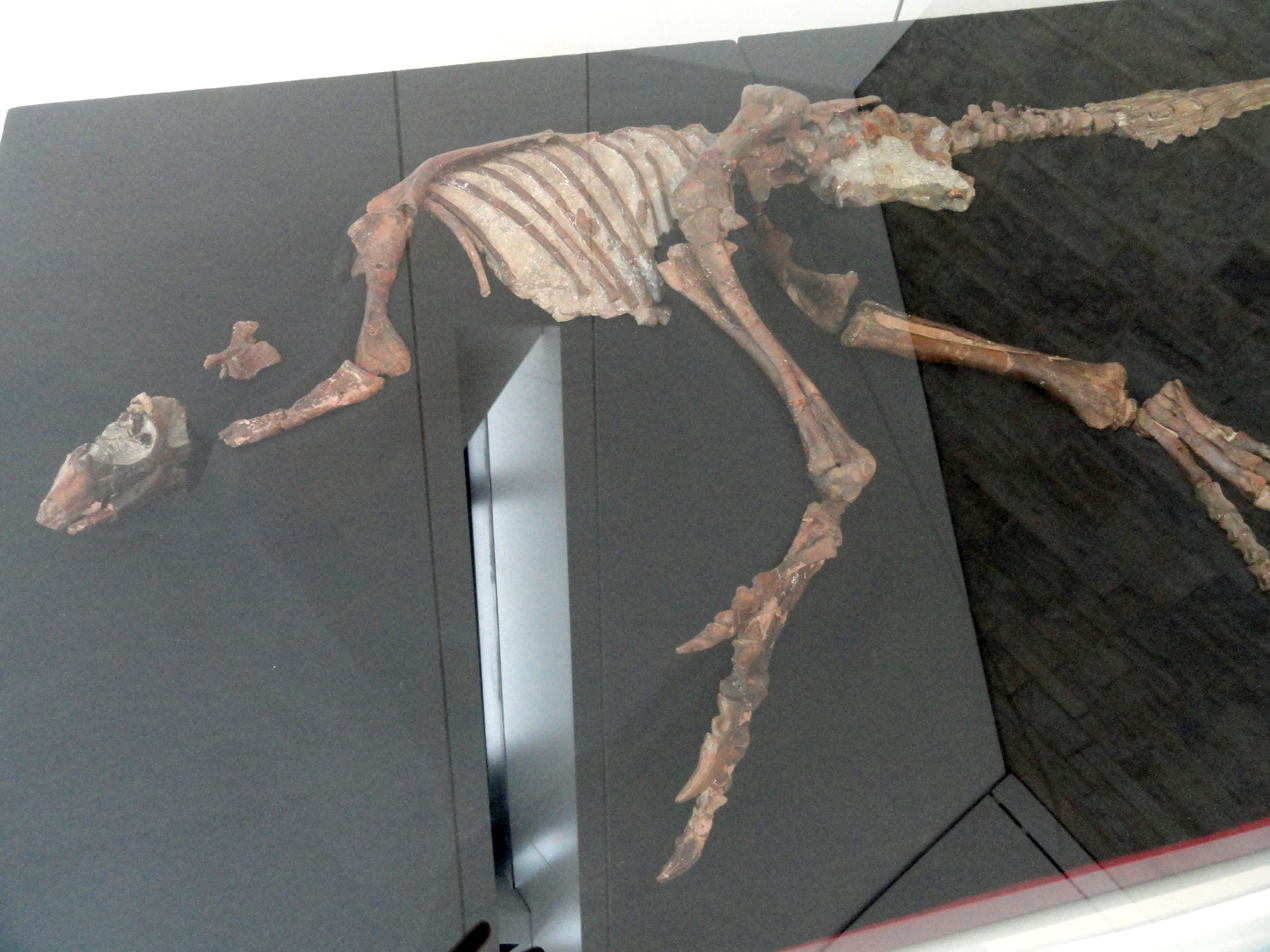
Fossil, Royal Ontario Museum

A 1922 expedition of the University of Toronto to what was then known as the Edmonton Formation (now the Horseshoe Canyon Formation) of Alberta uncovered the skeleton of a small dinosaur. The specimen was found around 0.80 km (0.5 mi) from the Red Deer River and 30 m (100 ft) above the water level, directly sound of the road that led to Rumsey Ferry. Later erosion and human activity (including the northward repositioning of the road and replacement of the ferry with Tolman Bridge) have left the original quarry position unclear. The badlands immediately south of the historic roadbed are outcrops of the Tolman Member of the Horseshoe Canyon Formation, so even though the precise location is unknown the specimen was deposited between ~69.6 and 70.9 million years ago. The animal was preserved lying on its left side within a hard, white sandstone concretion, with the head dislocated and the neck and parts of the right body scattered. Despite this, and the subsequent erosion upon exposure that heavily damaged the right side, the skull, torso, tail, and hindlimbs were recovered nearly complete. Originally identified as Field Number 2, it was assigned catalog number 5202 and later accessioned in the collections of the Royal Ontario Museum as specimen ROM 804. Prior to being described the skeleton was prepared out of the extremely hard rock by Levi Sternberg and G.E. Lindblad, and assembled for a wall mount display at the museum. Later the mount was disassembled, the skeleton and skull were prepared further, and then the skeleton was reinstalled after the museum displays were renovated.

ROM 804 was first described in 1926 by University of Toronto professor William A. Parks, where it was identified as a new species of hypsilophodontid. Parks named it as a new species of the genus Thescelosaurus at the time only known from the Lance Formation of Wyoming; Thescelosaurus warreni after Royal Ontario Museum board of trustees member H.D. Warren (Note: The species name has also been spelled warrenae as the name honours a woman.). T. warreni was described in the basis of a partially crushed skull and mandible with teeth lacking the front of the snout and the rear of the head, 16 dorsal vertebrae, a sacrum of six vertebrae, and 42 caudal vertebrae in the tail, a left pectoral girdle including the scapula and coracoid as well as the sternum and an ossified cartilate at the end of the scapula called the "supra-scapula", the left arm but without the hand, the left pelvis, and both complete legs. ROM 804 was maintained as a species of Thescelosaurus until 1937, when American palaeontologist Charles Mortram Sternberg identified a new species of Thescelosaurus, at which time he named the new genus Parksosaurus for T. warreni. The differences between Parksosaurus warreni and the two species of Thescelosaurus: T. neglectus and T. edmontonensis, were elaborated upon by Sternberg in 1940, where he resultingly placed Parksosaurus as a member of the hypsilophodontid subfamily Hypsilophodontinae while Thescelosaurus was placed in the new subfamily Thescelosaurinae.

Due to the extensive preparation since Parks initially described only the left side of the skull, in 1973 American palaeontologist Peter M. Galton redescribed the skull of Parksosaurus to compare it with other ornithopods. While the bones of the left side of the skull are articulated, those of the right side are displaced from their original positions. The remainder of the skeleton of Parksosaurus was not redescribed until the full anatomy was revisited by Hans-Dieter Sues, David C. Evans, Caleb Brown, and Galton in 2023, where both the skull and skeleton were revisited. Some elements described by Galton were reidentified, such as the "ceratobranchial" being a splenial, the "second cervical" being the right squamosal, part of the pterygoid being the vomer, the "orbitosphenoid" being the palatine, and the reidentification of teeth as from either the maxilla or dentary. As well, the axis and a middle cervical vertebra were identified for the first time. In contrast to the relative abundance of specimens of the Thescelosaurus species, only the holotype ROM 804 and an isolated tooth (Royal Tyrrell Museum of Palaeontology 2009.137.0017) from an Albertosaurus bonebed in the Horseshoe Canyon Formation are known from Parksosaurus. Both come from the Unit 4 of the formation, which is an interval of the deposition dominated by paleosols.

== Description ==
Size of Parksosaurus (center) compared to its relatives Thescelosaurus (right) and Orodromeus (left), as well as a human

Explicit estimates of the entire size of the animal are rare; in 2010 Gregory S. Paul estimated the length at 2.5 meters, the weight at forty-five kilograms. William Parks found the hindlimb of his T. warreni to be about the same length overall as that of Thescelosaurus neglectus (93.0 centimeters (3.051 feet) for T. warreni versus 95.5 centimeters (3.13 feet) for T. neglectus), even though the shin was shorter than the thigh in T. neglectus, the opposite of T. warreni. Thus, the animal would have been comparable to the better-known Thescelosaurus in linear dimensions, despite proportional differences (around 1 meter (3.3 feet) tall at the hips, 2–2.5 meters (6.6–8.2 ft) long). The proportional differences probably would have made it lighter, though, as less weight was concentrated near the thigh. Like Thescelosaurus, it had thin, partly ossified cartilaginous (intercostal) plates along the ribs. The shoulder girdle was robust. Parksosaurus had at least eighteen teeth in the maxilla and about twenty in the lower jaw; the number of teeth in the premaxilla is unknown.

== Classification ==
Parksosaurus has been considered to be a hypsilophodont since its description. Recent reviews have dealt with it with little comment, although David B. Norman and colleagues (2004), in the framework of a paraphyletic Hypsilophodontidae, found it to be the sister taxon to Thescelosaurus, and Richard Butler and colleagues (2008) found that it may be close to the South American genus Gasparinisaura. However, basal ornithopod phylogeny is poorly known at this point, albeit under study. Like Thescelosaurus, Parksosaurus had a relatively robust hindlimb, and an elongate skull without as much of an arched shape to the forehead compared to other hypsilophodonts. A 2015 study placed it as an intermediate member of Iguanodontia more derived than Elasmaria.

Cladogram based in the phylogenetic analysis of Rozadilla et al., 2015:

- - Hypsilophodon
  - - Thescelosaurus
    - Iguanodontia
      - Elasmaria
        - Gasparinisaura
        - - Morrosaurus
          - Trinisaura
          - Macrogryphosaurus
          - Notohypsilophodon
          - Talenkauen
          - Anabisetia
      - - Parksosaurus
        - - Kangnasaurus
          - - Rhabdodontidae
            - - Tenontosaurus
              - Dryomorpha

The cladogram below results from analysis by Herne et al., 2019, which placed Parksosaurus as the most basal member of Ornithopoda.

- Ornithischia
  - Heterodontosauridae
  - - Eocursor
    - - Thyreophora
      - Neornithischia
        - Lesothosaurus
        - - Agilisaurus
          - - - Hexinlusaurus
              - Yandusaurus
            - - - Nanosaurus
                - - Jeholosauridae
                    - Haya
                    - - Jeholosaurus
                      - Changchunsaurus
                  - Thescelosauridae
                    - - Orodromeus
                      - Koreanosaurus
                    - - Zephyrosaurus
                      - - Yueosaurus
                        - Thescelosaurus
              - Cerapoda
                - Marginocephalia
                - Ornithopoda
                  - Parksosaurus
                  - - Elasmaria
                      - Talenkauen
                      - - - Macrogryphosaurus
                          - Gasparinisaura
                        - - Galleonosaurus
                          - Leaellynasaura
                          - Anabisetia
                          - Diluvicursor
                    - Clypeodonta
                      - Hypsilophodon
                      - Iguanodontia
                        - Rhabdodontidae
                        - - Muttaburrasaurus
                          - - Tenontosaurus
                            - Dryomorpha

== Paleoecology and paleobiology ==
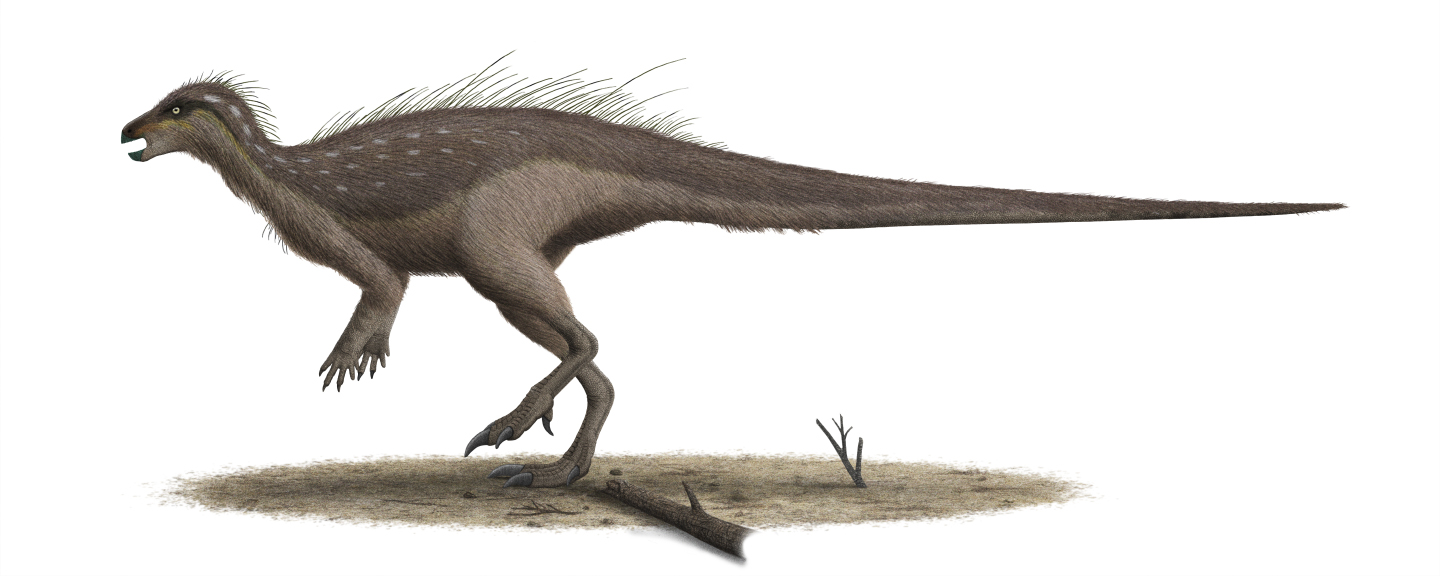
Life restoration of Parksosaurus warreni

Parksosaurus is known from the base of Unit 4 of the Horseshoe Canyon Formation, which dates to about 69.5 million years ago. Other dinosaur species from this same unit include the theropods Albertosaurus sarcophagus and Albertavenator curriei as well as the spike-crested hadrosaurid Saurolophus osborni, hollow-crested hadrosaurid Hypacrosaurus altispinus, and ankylosaurid Anodontosaurus lambei. Teeth of an unidentified ceratopsian species are known from the same stratigraphic level. The dinosaurs from this formation are sometimes known as Edmontonian, after a land mammal age, and are distinct from those in the formations above and below. The Horseshoe Canyon Formation is interpreted as having a significant marine influence, due to an encroaching Western Interior Seaway, the shallow sea that covered the midsection of North America through much of the Cretaceous.

In life, Parksosaurus, as a hypsilophodont, would have been a small, swift bipedal herbivore. It would have had a moderately long neck and small head with a horny beak, short but strong forelimbs, and long, powerful hindlimbs. Paul in 2010 suggested that the long toes were an adaptation for walking over mud or clay near rivers and that the strong arms were used for burrowing.
