= William Parks (paleontologist) =

Canadian scientist (1868–1936)

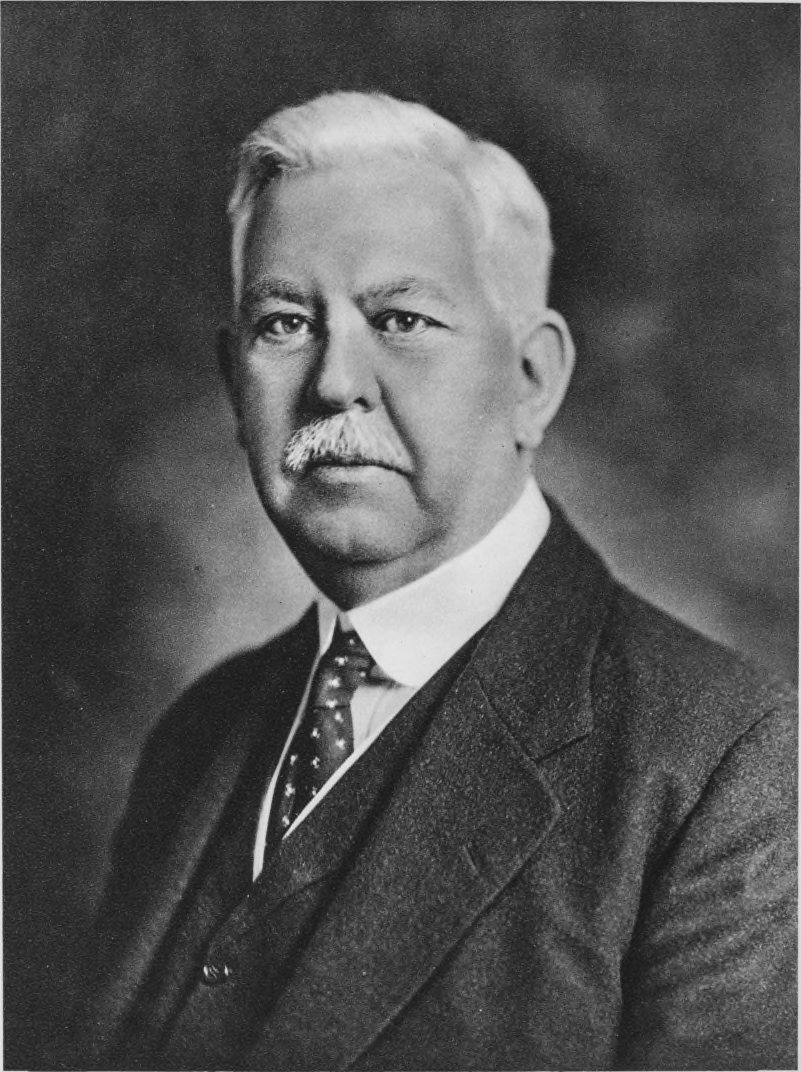
- Born: William Arthur Parks; December 11, 1868
- Died: October 3, 1936 (aged 67)
- Education: University of Toronto
- Awards: Foreign Member of the Royal Society
- Scientific career
- Workplaces: University of Toronto

William Arthur Parks (11 December 1868 – 3 October 1936) was a Canadian geologist and paleontologist, following in the tradition of Lawrence Lambe.

Parks was born in Hamilton, Ontario. After graduating with a Bachelor of Arts in 1892, Parks joined the University of Toronto's staff, where he taught geology, paleontology, and mineralogy. He went on to earn a PhD in 1900. He wrote 80 scientific papers in his lifetime. Parks died in Toronto, Ontario, in 1936.

== Named taxa ==
- 1919 Kritosaurus incurvimanus
- 1922 Parasaurolophus walkeri
- 1923 Corythosaurus intermedius
- 1923 Lambeosaurus lambei
- 1924 Dyoplosaurus acutosquameus
- 1925 Arrhinoceratops brachyops
- 1925 Neomeryx finni
- 1926 Struthiomimus brevitertius (type species of Dromiceiomimus)
- 1926 Thescelosaurus warreni (type species of Parksosaurus).
- 1928 Struthiomimus samueli
- 1928 Albertosaurus arctunguis
- 1931 Tetragonosaurus praeceps
- 1931 Tetragonosaurus erectofrons
- 1933 Struthiomimus currelli
- 1933 Struthiomimus ingens
- 1933 Ornithomimus elegans (type species of Citipes)
- 1935 Corythosaurus bicristatus
- 1935 Corythosaurus brevicristatus
- 1935 Corythosaurus frontalis

== Honors ==
Parksosaurus was named in his honor by Charles M. Sternberg in 1937.

Professional and academic associations
Preceded by John C. McLennan	President of the Royal Society of Canada; 1925–1926	Succeeded by James H. Coyne
