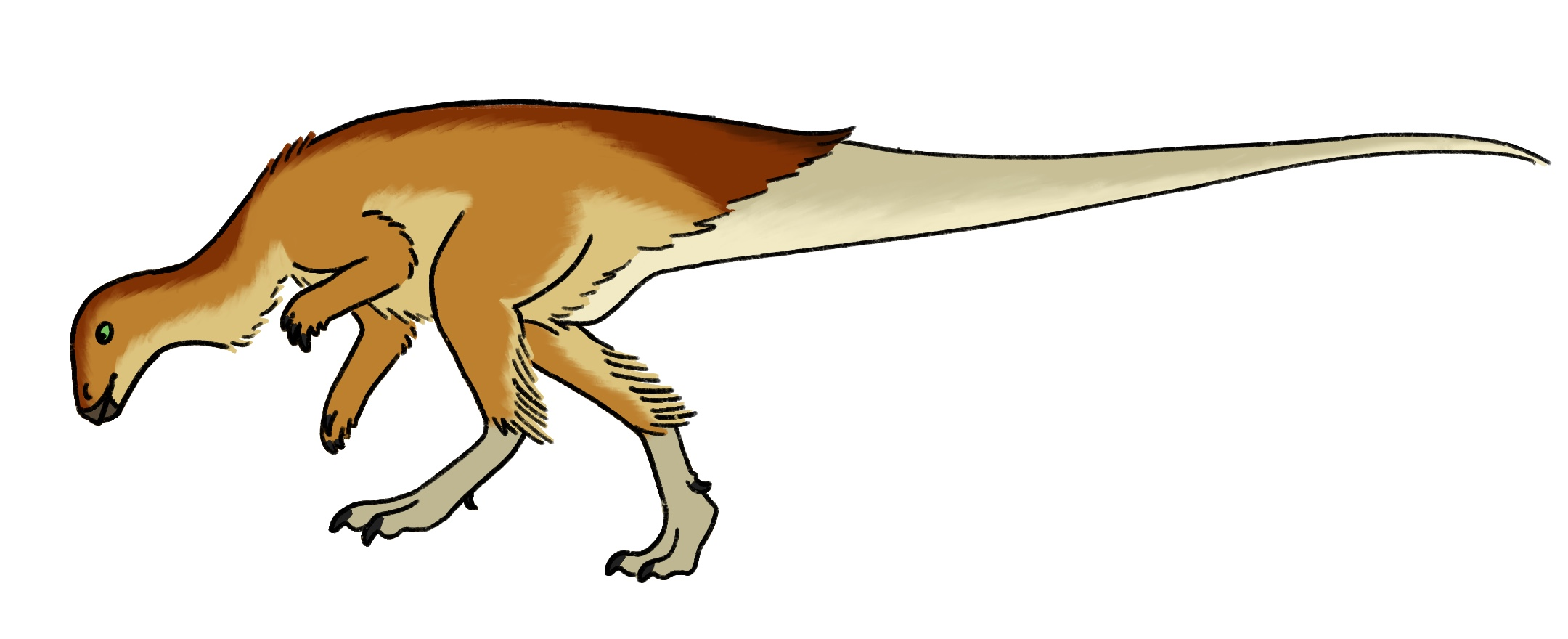
- Life reconstruction of Nevadadromeus

Scientific classification
- Domain: Eukaryota
- Kingdom: Animalia
- Phylum: Chordata
- Clade: Dinosauria
- Clade: †Ornithischia
- Family: †Thescelosauridae
- Subfamily: †Thescelosaurinae
- Genus: †Nevadadromeus; Bonde et al., 2022

Type species
- †Nevadadromeus schmitti Bonde et al., 2022

= Nevadadromeus =

Nevadadromeus Temporal range: Late Cretaceous, Cenomanian

Extinct genus of dinosaurs

Nevadadromeus (meaning "Nevada runner") is an extinct genus of small thescelosaurine ornithischian dinosaur, from the Willow Tank Formation of Nevada, United States. The genus contains a single species, N. schmitti, which represents the first non-avian dinosaur named from Nevada.

== Discovery and naming ==
The Nevadadromeus holotype specimen, NSC 2008-002 was discovered near the Valley of Fire in 2008 and the bones were prepared for an event in Henderson, Nevada in 2021. A second ornithopod from Nevada, a hadrosaur, was also leaked during the event, but it was not ready for public view until 2022. Nevadadromeus was formally published in October 2022.

In 2022, Bonde et al. described Nevadadromeus as a new genus and species of thescelosaurine. The generic name, "Nevadadromeus", combines a reference to the Nevada, the state the holotype was discovered in, with the Greek "dromeus", meaning "runner". The specific name, "schmitti", honors geologist James G. Schmitt, who initially described the geology of the Willow Tank Formation.

== Classification ==
The fossil remains of Nevadadromeus contain features of both thescelosaurines and orodromines, but the describers find it more likely to be a thescelosaurine. This makes it the oldest member of its subfamily from North America, as all other thescelosaurines date to the Maastrichtian.
