= Nasal foramina =

Openings in nasal bones

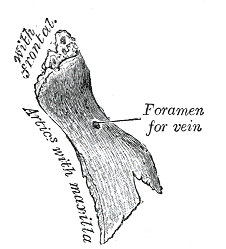
- Right nasal bone. Outer surface.

Details

Identifiers
- Latin: foramina nasalia
- TA98: A02.1.10.003
- TA2: 750
- FMA: 57653

The nasal foramina are foramina which run through the nasal bones.
