= Gongbusaurus =

Gongbusaurus Temporal range: Late Jurassic, 160–157 Ma

Scientific classification
- Kingdom: Animalia
- Phylum: Chordata
- Class: Reptilia
- Clade: Dinosauria
- Clade: †Ornithischia
- Genus: †Gongbusaurus; Dong, Zhou, & Zhang, 1983
- Species: †G. shiyii

Binomial name
- †Gongbusaurus shiyii Dong, Zhou, & Zhang, 1983

Possible species
- †G. wucaiwanensis? Dong, 1989

Synonyms
- Eugongbusaurus? Knoll, 1999

Extinct genus of dinosaurs

Gongbusaurus is a genus of ornithischian, perhaps ornithopod, dinosaur that lived between about 160 and 157 million years ago, in the Late Jurassic period. A small herbivore, it is very poorly known. Two species have been assigned to it, but as the original name is based on teeth, there is no concrete evidence to connect the two species. Its fossils have been found in China.

== Description ==
Gongbusaurus, by extrapolation from the remains of possible species "G." wucaiwanensis and other basal ornithopods, was a herbivorous bipedal animal around 1.3 to 1.5 meters (4.3 to 4.9 ft) long. The tibia of "G." wucaiwanensis is 19.5 centimetres long. It would have been a strong runner.

== Classification ==
Dong Zhiming, Zhou Shiwu, and Zhang Zicheng, who originally described the type species G. shiyii, thought it was most similar to Fabrosaurus and assigned it to the nebulous Fabrosauridae. Upon description of the second species "G." wucaiwanensis several years later, Dong elected to assign it to Hypsilophodontidae, an equally nebulous (paraphyletic) family of somewhat more derived small bipedal ornithischians, while at about the same time, David B. Weishampel and Larry Witmer found Gongbusaurus to be an indeterminate basal ornithischian. The most recent reviews also found the genus to be a dubious ornithischian, and recommended renaming the better-known second species. Peter Galton has noted that the teeth on which Gongbusaurus is based resemble those of Sarcolestes and Gastonia, so the genus may actually be an ankylosaurian.

== History ==
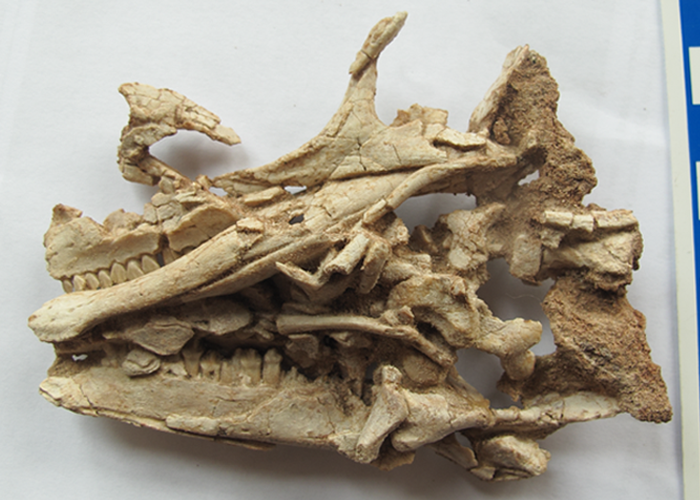
"Gongbusaurus" wucaiwanensis ("Eugongbusaurus") skull IVPP 14559

Dong and his coauthors established Gongbusaurus on two small teeth, holotype IVPP V9069: one, V9069-1, from the beak (premaxilla), and the other, V9069-2, from the cheek (maxilla). These remains came from the Oxfordian-age Upper Shaximiao Formation in Sichuan, China and were found by a unit of the Chinese aerial survey behind an elementary school in the village of Huangtong, part of the Duxin commune, in Rongxian or Rong County. The type species Gongbusaurus shiyii was named and described by Dong, Zhou, and Zhang in 1983. The generic name is derived from the imperial ministry, bu, of public works, gong, in honour of the great poet Du Fu who in Sichuan worked for that ministry after 760, in the rank of shi yi, "junior consultant", which explains the specific name. As shi yi also can mean "register of lost objects" the specific name is at the same time a pun on the fact that the teeth were later separately found among the assorted bones collected during the dig. Dong added a second species, "G." wucaiwanensis, in 1989 for a fragmentary skeleton (holotype IVPP 8302) including a partial lower jaw, three tail vertebrae, and a partial forelimb, and added another specimen (paratype IVPP 8303) consisting of two hip vertebrae, eight tail vertebrae, and two complete hind limbs. A partial foot (IVPP 8304) and four separate dorsal vertebrae and a caudal vertebra were referred. These remains came from the roughly contemporaneous Shishugou Formation of Wucaiwan, Xinjiang.

Tooth species are not well regarded in dinosaur paleontology, because dinosaur teeth are generally not distinctive enough to hold a name. Therefore, it is unsurprising that other paleontologists have suggested removing "G." wucaiwanensis. A possible replacement name, "Eugongbusaurus", has accidentally gotten to the public, but remains informal.
