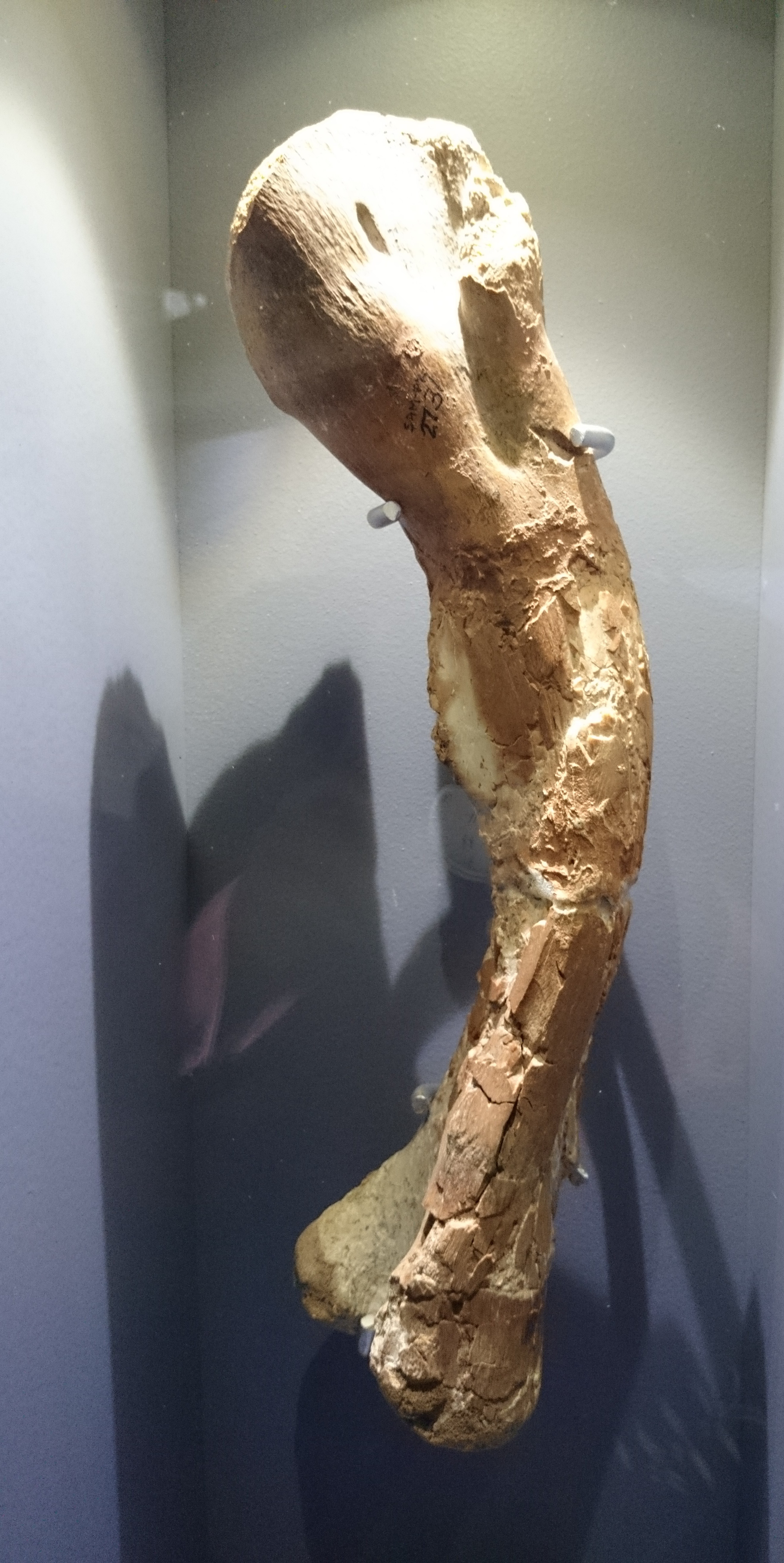
- Thigh bone of cf. Kangnasaurus

Scientific classification
- Kingdom: Animalia
- Phylum: Chordata
- Class: Reptilia
- Clade: Dinosauria
- Clade: †Ornithischia
- Clade: †Ornithopoda
- Clade: †Elasmaria
- Genus: †Kangnasaurus; Haughton, 1915
- Species: †K. coetzeei

Binomial name
- †Kangnasaurus coetzeei Haughton, 1915

= Kangnasaurus =

Kangnasaurus Temporal range: Campanian-Maastrichtian ~80–66 Ma

Extinct genus of dinosaurs

Kangnasaurus (meaning "Farm Kangnas lizard") is a genus of elasmarian ornithopod dinosaur found in Late Cretaceous rocks of South Africa. It is known from a tooth and possibly some postcranial remains dating between the middle-Campanian to Maastrichtian Kalahari Deposits Formation.

== Discovery and naming ==
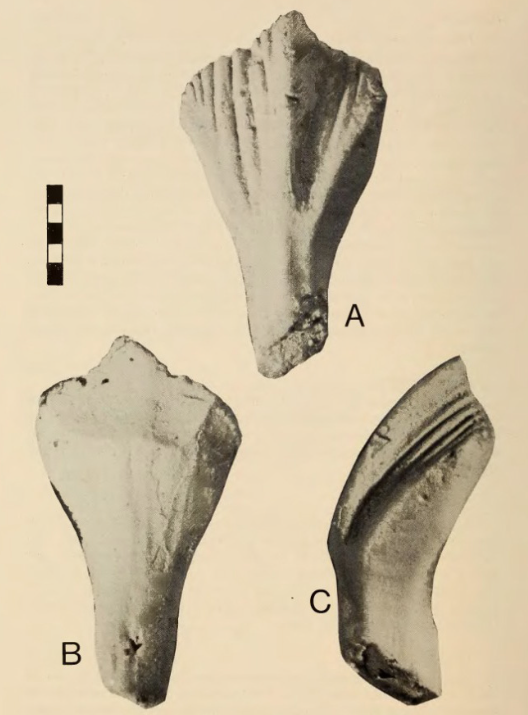
Holotype tooth of K. coetzeei (SAM 2732) as seen from three different angles; figured from Haughton (1915)

Kangnasaurus was named in 1915 by Sidney H. Haughton. The type species is Kangnasaurus coetzeei. The generic name refers to the Kangnas farm; the specific name to the farmer, Coetzee. Kangnasaurus is based on holotype SAM 2732, a tooth found at a depth of 34 metres in a well at Farm Kangnas, in the Orange River valley of northern Cape Province, South Africa. The age of these rocks, conglomerates in an ancient crater lake, was once suggested to date to the Early Cretaceous (probably early-Aptian) due to the original phylogenetic position of the taxa as a dryosaurid. But a Late Cretaceous age between the Campanian and Maastrichtian is more likely due to sedimentological analyses. Haughton thought SAM 2732 was a tooth from the upper jaw, but Michael Cooper reidentified it as a lower jaw tooth in 1985. This had implications for its classification: Haughton thought the tooth was that of an iguanodontid, while Cooper identified it as from an animal more like Dryosaurus, a more basal ornithopod.

Haughton described several other fossils as possibly belonging to Kangnasaurus. These include five partial thigh bones, a partial thigh bone and shin bone, a partial metatarsal, a partial shin and foot, vertebrae, and unidentified bones. Some of the bones apparently came from other deposits, and Haughton was not certain that they all belonged to his new genus. Cooper was also not certain, but described the other specimens as if they did belong to Kangnasaurus. Like other basal iguanodontians, it would have been a bipedal herbivore.

== Classification ==
Kangnasaurus was originally regarded as dubious, although a 2007 review of dryosaurids by Ruiz-Omeñaca and colleagues retained it as potentially valid, differing from other dryosaurids by details of the thigh bone.

The differences in interpretation between Haughton and Cooper regarding the placement of the tooth had implications for the taxon's classification: Haughton thought the tooth was indicative that of an iguanodontid when interpreted as a maxillary position, while Cooper classified it as coming from an animal more like Dryosaurus based on his assignment of the tooth to the dentary. However, more recent studies have separately uncovered a position nested within the elasmarian group.
