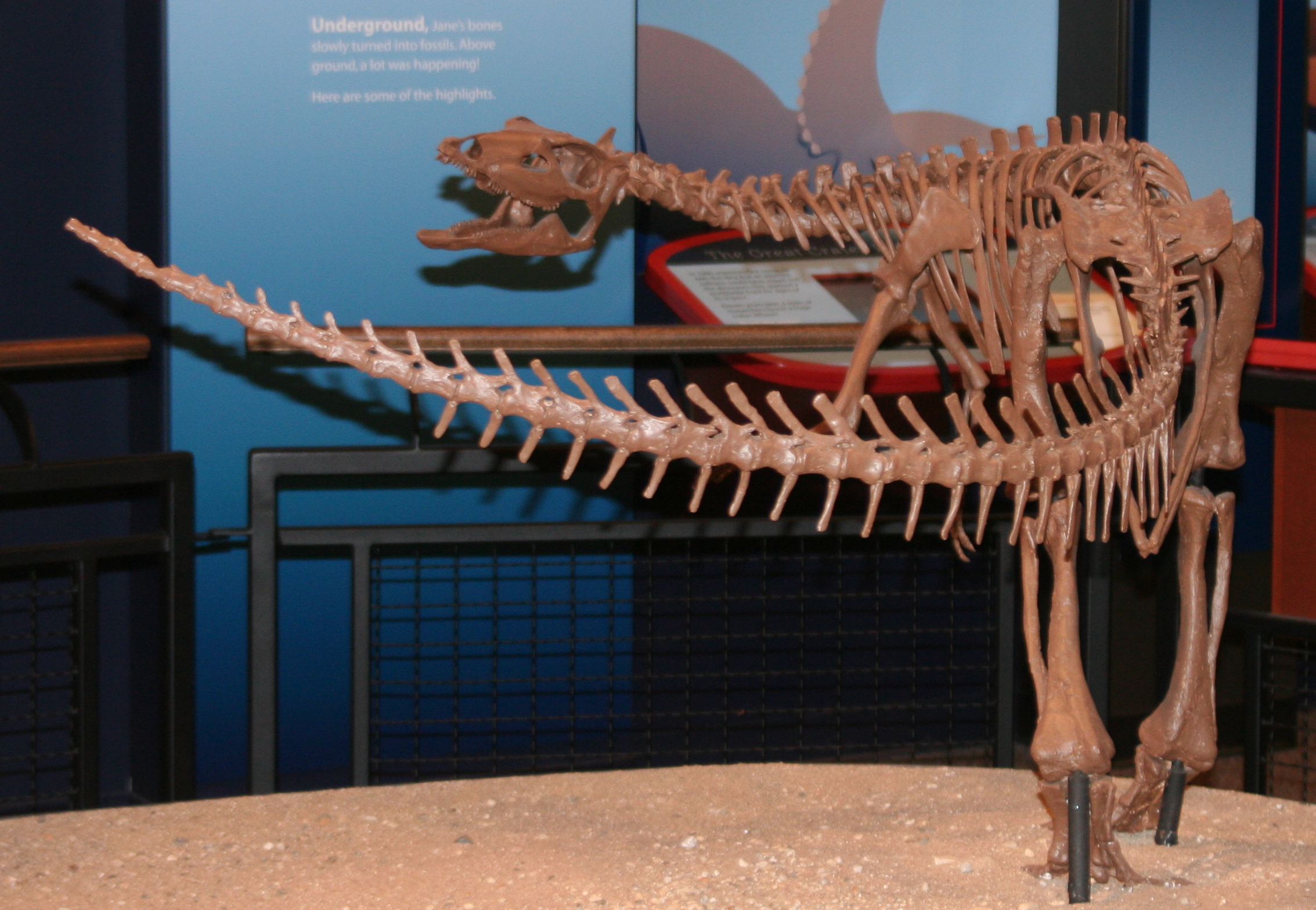
- Mounted specimen of Thescelosaurus, Burpee Museum of Natural History

Scientific classification
- Kingdom: Animalia
- Phylum: Chordata
- Class: Reptilia
- Clade: Dinosauria
- Clade: †Ornithischia
- Clade: †Pyrodontia
- Family: †Thescelosauridae; Sternberg, 1937

Subfamilies
- †Orodrominae Brown et al., 2013; †Albertadromeus; †Koreanosaurus; †Nevadadromeus?; †Orodromeus; †Oryctodromeus; †Zephyrosaurus; †Thescelosaurinae Sternberg, 1940; †Changchunsaurus?; †Changmiania?; †Doolysaurus; †Fona; †Haya?; †Jeholosaurus?; †Nevadadromeus?; †Oryctodromeus?; †Parksosaurus; †Thescelosaurus; †Yueosaurus?

Synonyms
- Parksosauridae Buchholz, 2002; Jeholosauridae? Han et al., 2012

= Thescelosauridae =

Thescelosaurids Temporal range: Early–Late Cretaceous, 130–66 Ma

Extinct family of dinosaurs

Thescelosauridae is a clade of small-medium sized bipedal neornithischians from the Cretaceous of East Asia and North America. The group was originally used as a name by Charles M. Sternberg in 1937, but was not formally defined until 2013, where it was used by Brown and colleagues as the group uniting Thescelosaurus and Orodromeus, based on their phylogenetic results.

== Taxonomic history ==
Although Hypsilophodontidae was interpreted as a natural group in the early 1990s, this hypothesis has fallen out of favor and Hypsilophodontidae has been found to be an unnatural family composed of a variety of animals more or less closely related to Iguanodontia (paraphyletic), with various small clades of closely related taxa. "Hypsilophodontidae" and "hypsilophodont" are better understood as informal terms for an evolutionary grade, not a true clade. Thescelosaurus has been regarded as both very basal and very derived among the hypsilophodonts. One issue that has potentially interfered with classifying Thescelosaurus is that not all of the remains assigned to T. neglectus necessarily belong to it. Clint Boyd and colleagues found that while the clade Thescelosaurus included the genus Bugenasaura and the species that had been assigned to that genus, there were at least two and possibly three species within Thescelosaurus, and several specimens previously assigned to T. neglectus could not yet be assigned to a species within the genus. It appears to be closely related to Parksosaurus, although this relationship has been called into question.

The dissolution of Hypsilophodontidae was followed by the recognition of the distinct family Parksosauridae by Buchholz in 2002, defined as the most inclusive clade containing Parksosaurus warreni, but not Hypsilophodon foxii, Dryosaurus altus, or Iguanodon bernissartensis. Boyd et al. (2009) and Brown et al. (2011) found North American "hypsilophodonts" of Cretaceous age to sort into two related clusters, one (Orodrominae) consisting of Orodromeus, Oryctodromeus, and Zephyrosaurus, and the other (Thescelosaurinae) consisting of Parksosaurus and Thescelosaurus. Brown et al. (2013) recovered similar results, with the addition of the new genus Albertadromeus to the Orodromeus clade (called Orodrominae) and several long-snouted Asian forms (previously described under Jeholosauridae) to the Thescelosaurus clade (called Thescelosaurinae).

During a phylogenetic revision of neornithischians by Clint Boyd in 2015, the authorship of Thescelosauridae was given to Brown and colleagues, which meant that the similar name Parksosauridae, informally defined in 2002 by Buchholz, would have had priority over Thescelosauridae. The two clades had slightly different definitions, with Parksosauridae referring to all animals closer to Parksosaurus than Hypsilophodon, but they contained the same taxa so Boyd used Parksosauridae under the assumption it had priority. However, in formalizing the clade following the regulations of the PhyloCode, Madzia, Boyd, and colleagues identified in 2021 that Sternberg was the proper authority for Thescelosauridae, giving it priority over Parksosauridae. As well, they gave Thescelosauridae the definition of the largest clade containing Thescelosaurus neglectus but not Iguanodon bernissartensis, as long as Hypsilophodon foxii was not in the group, modifying previous definitions for Thescelosauridae in order to maintain its modern use, so that the clade was not applied if Thescelosaurus fell within Hypsilophodontidae, a family that has not been recently used but may be revived if the systematic position of Hypsilophodon was solidified at some point in the future. Madzia et al. (2021) identified the analysis of Madzia et al. (2018) as the reference analysis for the name Thescelosauridae, an analysis based on a revised version of the 2015 Boyd analysis.

=== Phylogeny ===
After Madzia et al. (2018)

- Neornithischia
  - Lesothosaurus
  - - Agilisaurus
    - - - Hexinlusaurus
        - Yandusaurus
      - - Kulindadromeus
        - - Jeholosauridae
            - Jeholosaurus
            - Yueosaurus
          - - Nanosaurus
            - - - Hypsilophodon
                - Cerapoda
              - Thescelosauridae
                - Thescelosaurinae
                  - Notohypsilophodon
                  - Parksosaurus
                  - Thescelosaurus assiniboiensis
                  - Thescelosaurus garbanii
                  - Thescelosaurus neglectus
                - Orodrominae
                  - - Haya
                    - Changchunsaurus
                  - - - Koreanosaurus
                      - Oryctodromeus
                    - - Albertadromeus
                      - Kaiparowits orodromine
                      - Orodromeus
                      - Zephyrosaurus

== Description ==
Size comparison of several thescelosaurids to humans, including two Thescelosaurus species (right), Parksosaurus (center) and Orodromeus (left),

Thescelosaurids were small to medium sized bipedal ornithischians. Members of the subfamily Thescelosaurinae are characterised by relatively short forelimbs, cheek teeth that are leaf shaped, an elongate snout tipped with a horny beak and ribs overlain by ossified plates. Thescelosauridae as a whole is characterised by a number of synapomorphies, including a concave area in the posterior of the premaxilla near the maxilla contact.

== Paleoecology ==
Thescelosaurids were highly selective browsers that would have fed mainly on soft, pulpy foods. It has been suggested that at least some thescelosaurids, particularly orodromines, though perhaps even large thescelosaurines like Thescelosaurus, engaged in burrowing, as is known for Oryctodromeus which was found in burrows, based upon the packing of their bones in situations where they typically would have been scattered.
