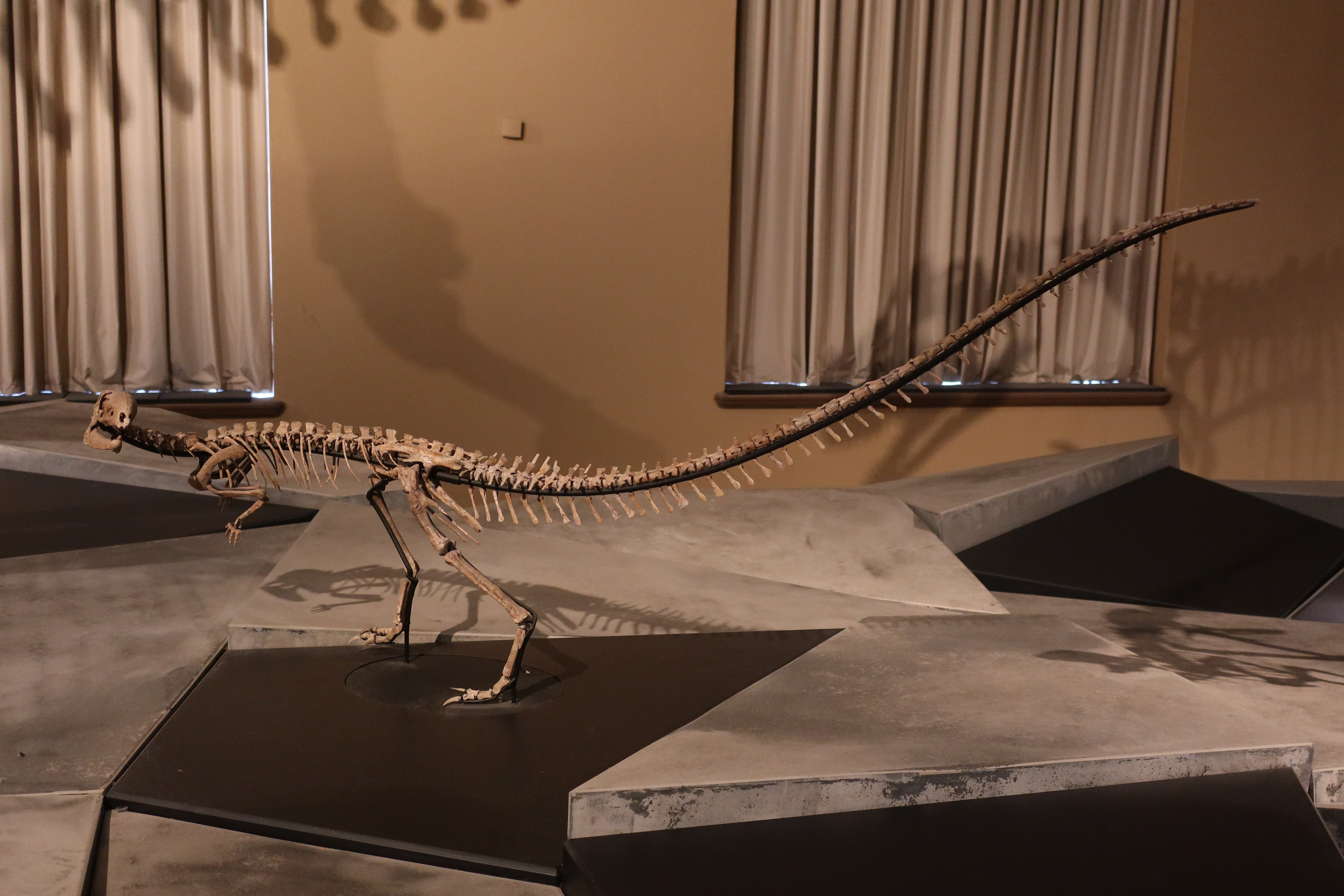
- Mounted skeleton, Natural History Museum of Berlin

Scientific classification
- Kingdom: Animalia
- Phylum: Chordata
- Class: Reptilia
- Clade: Dinosauria
- Clade: †Ornithischia
- Family: †Thescelosauridae
- Subfamily: †Orodrominae
- Genus: †Zephyrosaurus; Sues, 1980

Type species
- †Zephyrosaurus schaffi Sues, 1980

= Zephyrosaurus =

Zephyrosaurus Temporal range: Early Cretaceous, ~113 Ma

Extinct genus of dinosaurs

Zephyrosaurus (meaning "westward wind lizard") is a genus of orodromine ornithischian dinosaur based on a partial skull and postcranial fragments discovered in the Early Cretaceous (Aptian-Albian) Cloverly Formation of Carbon County, Montana, USA. New remains are under description, and tracks from Maryland and Virginia, also in the US, have been attributed to animals similar to Zephyrosaurus.

== Discovery and history ==
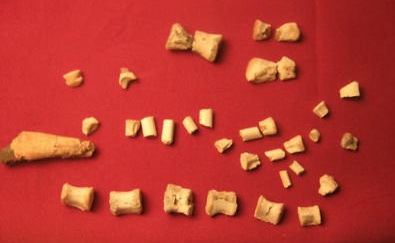
Fragmentary juvenile specimen of Z. schaffi from the Cloverly Formation

Hans-Dieter Sues named his new genus in recognition of the fossil being found in western North America, and Charles R. Schaff, who found the specimen. MCZ 4392, the type specimen, is composed of jaw fragments, the braincase and associated bones, several partial vertebrae, and rib fragments. He found the new genus to represent a previously unknown lineage of hypsilophodont (a taxon now considered not natural), similar in some respects to Hypsilophodon.

Because of the fragmentary nature of the type, and lack of additional remains, Zephyrosaurus had not attracted much attention until recently, when two separate events brought it more recognition. First, Martha Kutter, in a 2003 abstract, reported on new remains of this genus under study at the Sam Noble Oklahoma Museum of Natural History, including the remains of at least seven individuals with bones from all regions of the body.

Then, Stanford et al. (2004) published on dinosaur tracks from the Patuxent Formation of Maryland and Virginia, which they named Hypsiloichnus marylandicus and attributed to an animal akin to Zephyrosaurus based on the proportions of the hands and feet.

== Description ==
Zephyrosaurus is still very incompletely known. Among other distinctive characteristics, it had a steep face, a raised knob on the upper jaw, and a larger knob on the cheekbone. Some of the bones may have allowed movement within the skull (cranial kinesis) as well. Like other orodromines, it had beak teeth.

== Classification ==
Several studies have suggested that Zephyrosaurus and Orodromeus are closely related, mostly by virtue of both having bosses on their cheeks. Other studies have had difficulty classifying it, due to the sparseness of the original material. Oryctodromeus also shares several characteristics with Zephyrosaurus and Orodromeus, some of which may be related to burrowing. Phylogenetic analysis in the 2010s has classified Zephyrosaurus as part of the Thescelosauridae family.

== Paleobiology ==
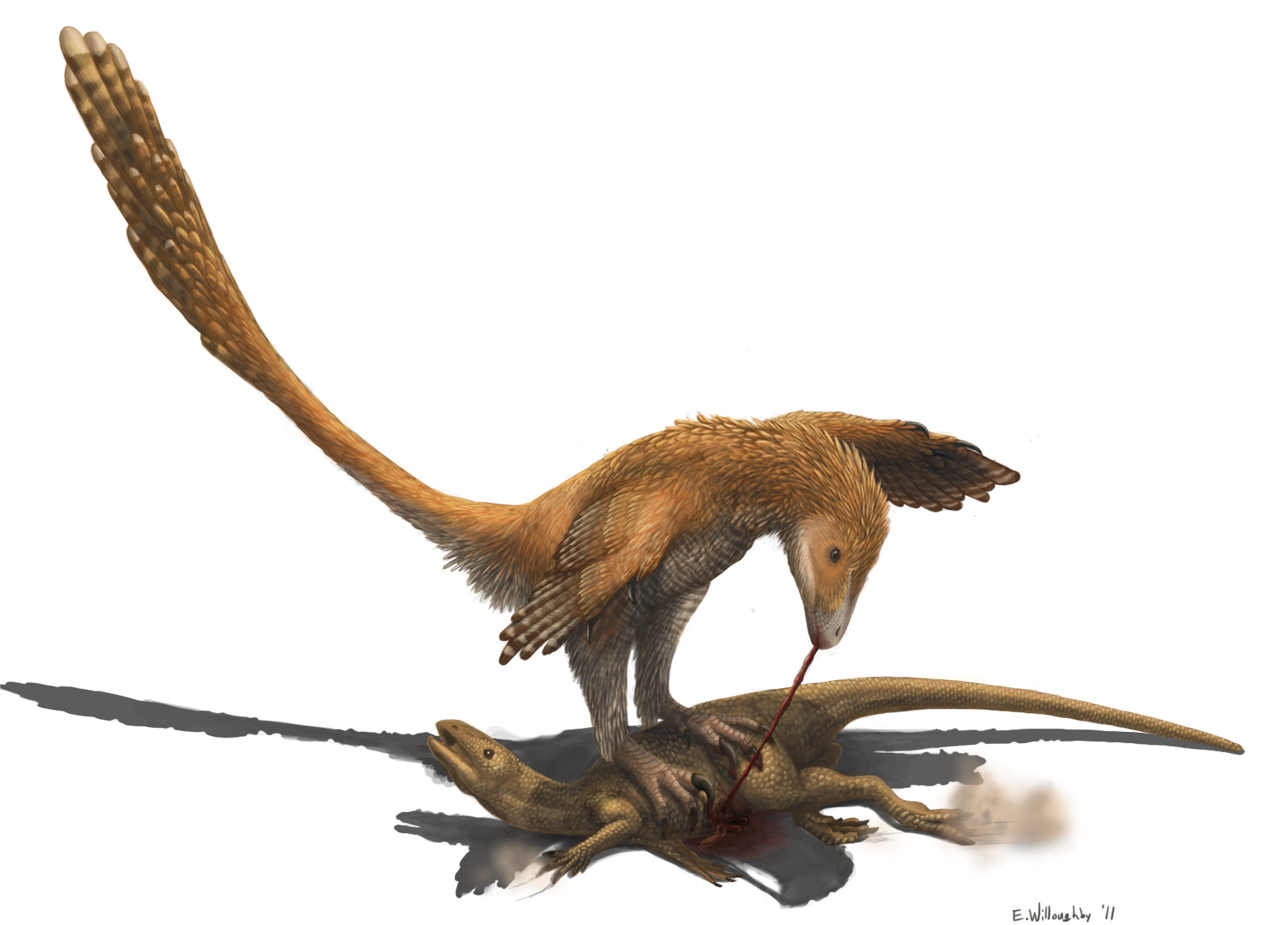
Restoration of Zephyrosaurus being attacked by a Deinonychus

Zephyrosaurus would have been a small, swift, bipedal herbivore. Like Orodromeus and Oryctodromeus, it may have burrowed as well.
