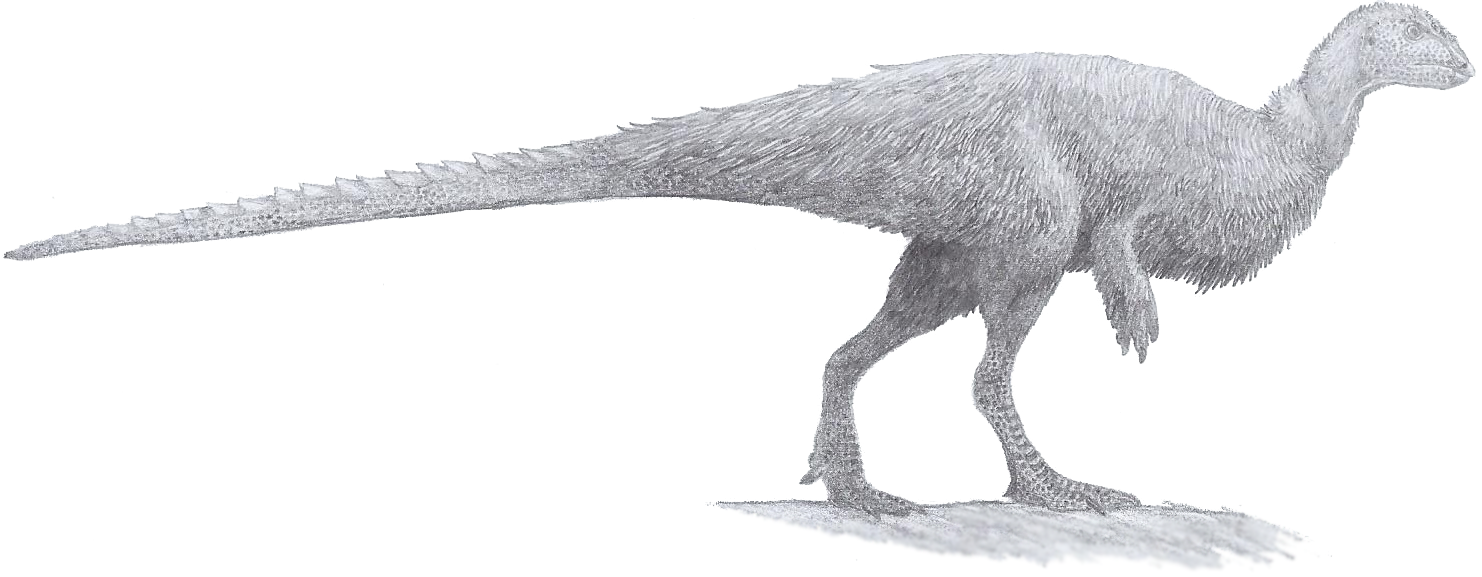
- Orodromeus makelai

Scientific classification
- Kingdom: Animalia
- Phylum: Chordata
- Class: Reptilia
- Clade: Dinosauria
- Clade: †Ornithischia
- Family: †Thescelosauridae
- Subfamily: †Orodrominae
- Genus: †Orodromeus; Horner & Weishampel, 1988
- Species: †O. makelai

Binomial name
- †Orodromeus makelai Horner & Weishampel, 1988

= Orodromeus =

Orodromeus Temporal range: Late Cretaceous, 76.9-75 Ma

Extinct genus of dinosaurs

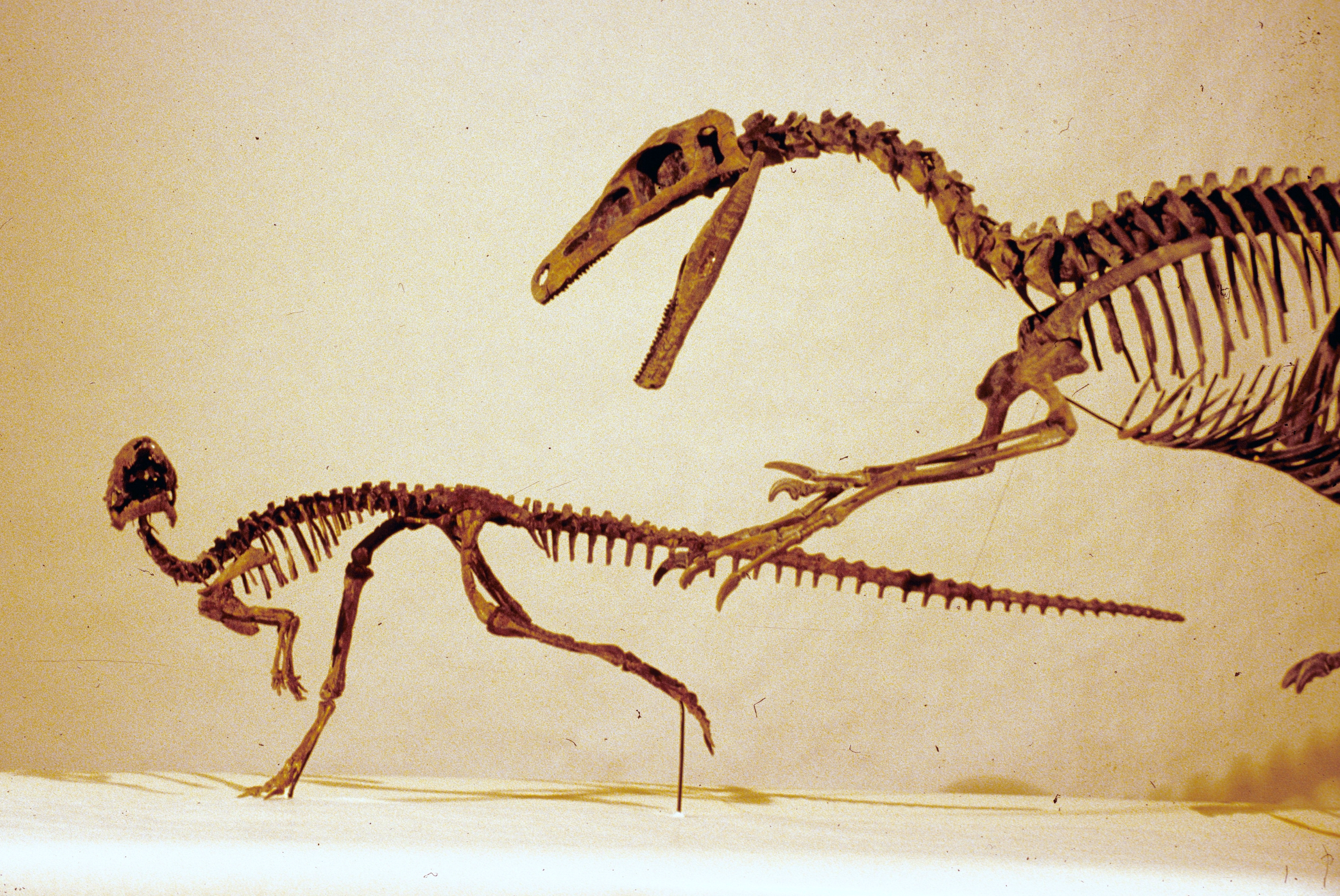
Reconstruction of the Orodromeus skeleton

Orodromeus (meaning "Mountain Runner") is a genus of herbivorous orodromine thescelosaurid dinosaur from the Late Cretaceous of North America. Only one species is known, the type species Orodromeus makelai.

== Discovery and naming ==
Size of known individuals of Orodromeus (left) compared to its relatives Thescelosaurus (right) and Parksosaurus (center), as well as a human

The remains of Orodromeus were discovered by Robert Makela during the excavation in Teton County, Montana, of the Egg Mountain brooding colony of a much larger relative, Maiasaura. The type species, Orodromeus makelai, was named and shortly described by Jack Horner and David B. Weishampel in 1988. The generic name is derived from Greek ὄρος, oros, "mountain", in reference to the Egg Mountain site, and δρομεύς, dromeus, "runner", referring to the cursorial habits of the animal. The specific name honoured the late Makela, who had died in a car accident in 1987 shortly after he discovered the first remains of the animal.

The holotype specimen, MOR 294, was found in a layer of the Two Medicine Formation, dating from the Campanian stage, about 75 million years ago. It consists of a partial skeleton with skull. The paratypes are MOR 246, a clutch of nineteen eggs, some with embryos; PP 22412, a set of hindlimbs; MOR 331, a partial skeleton; MOR 248, a skeleton with skull; and MOR 403, a braincase. A full published description is still lacking, though an unpublished thesis on Orodromeus exists. However, MOR 246 and other eggs from Egg Mountain are now considered to belong to a troodontid which may be Stenonychosaurus.

== Description ==
Orodromeus was a small fast bipedal herbivore that probably coexisted with dinosaurs such as Daspletosaurus and Einiosaurus. Its length was estimated by Horner & Weishampel at 2.5 metres.

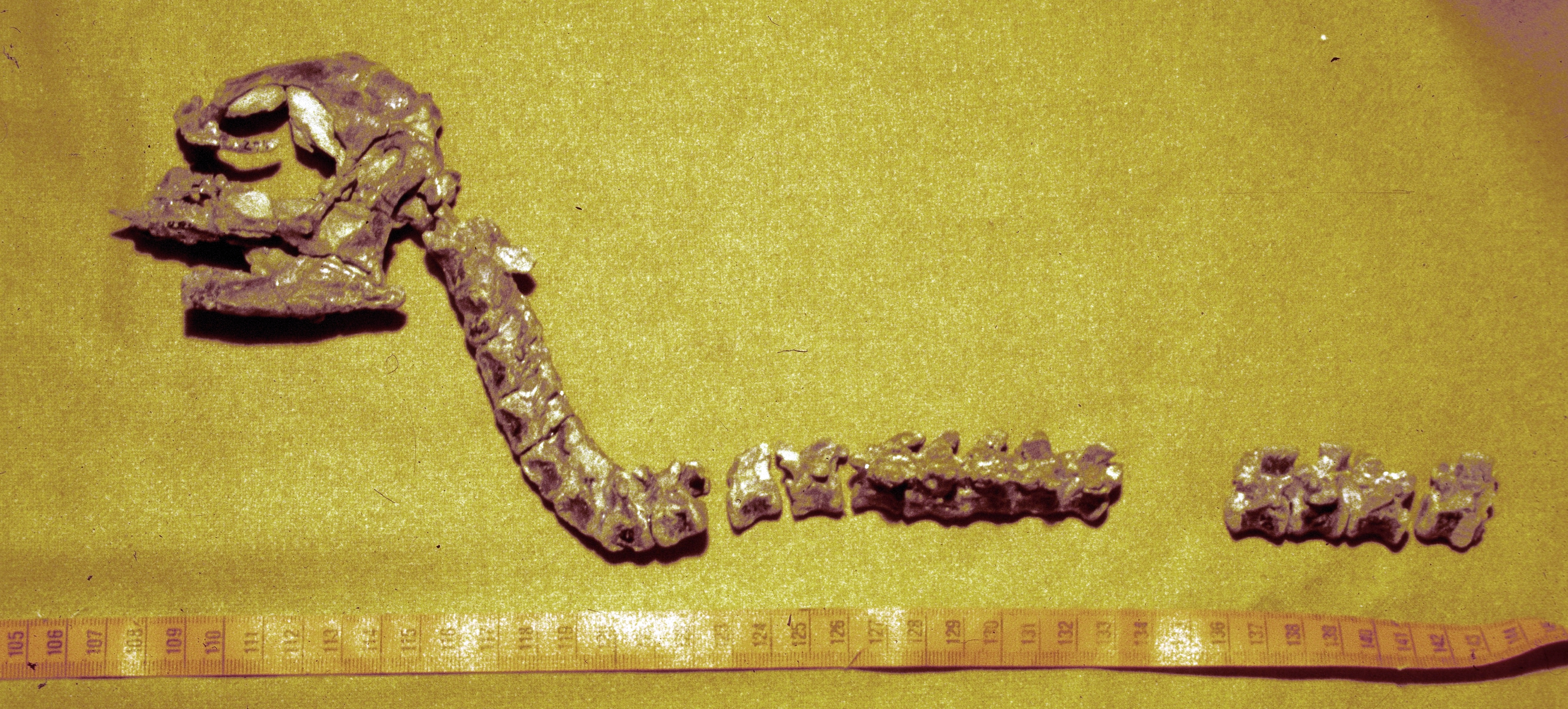
Skull and partial vertebral column of Orodromeus MOR 294

Orodromeus is distinguished by a palpebral that is at its back attached to the postorbital; a boss on the jugal; a non-fused wrist; and triangular maxillary and dentary teeth with a superficial flat occlusion.

== Phylogeny ==
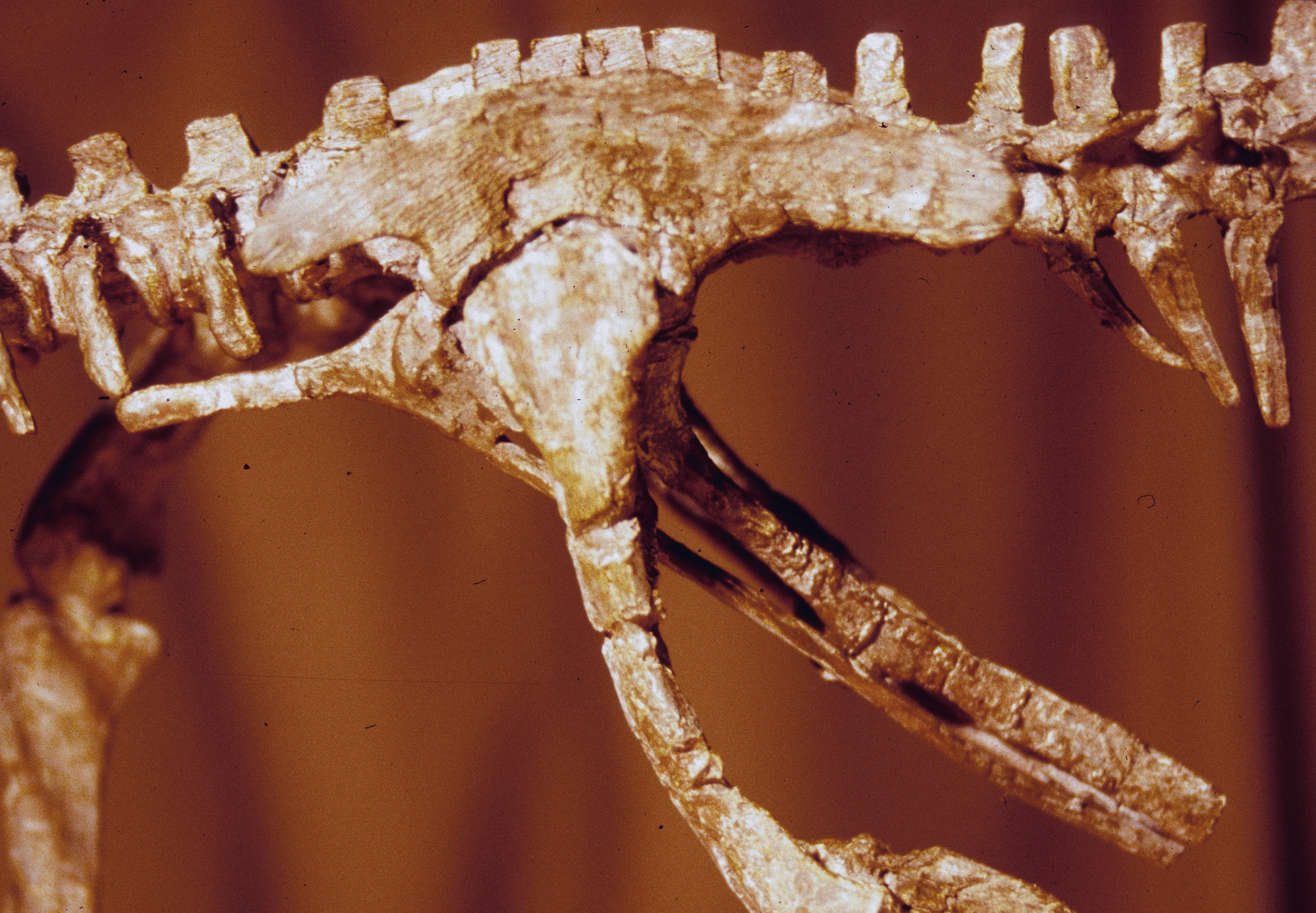
Reconstructed pelvis of Orodromeus.

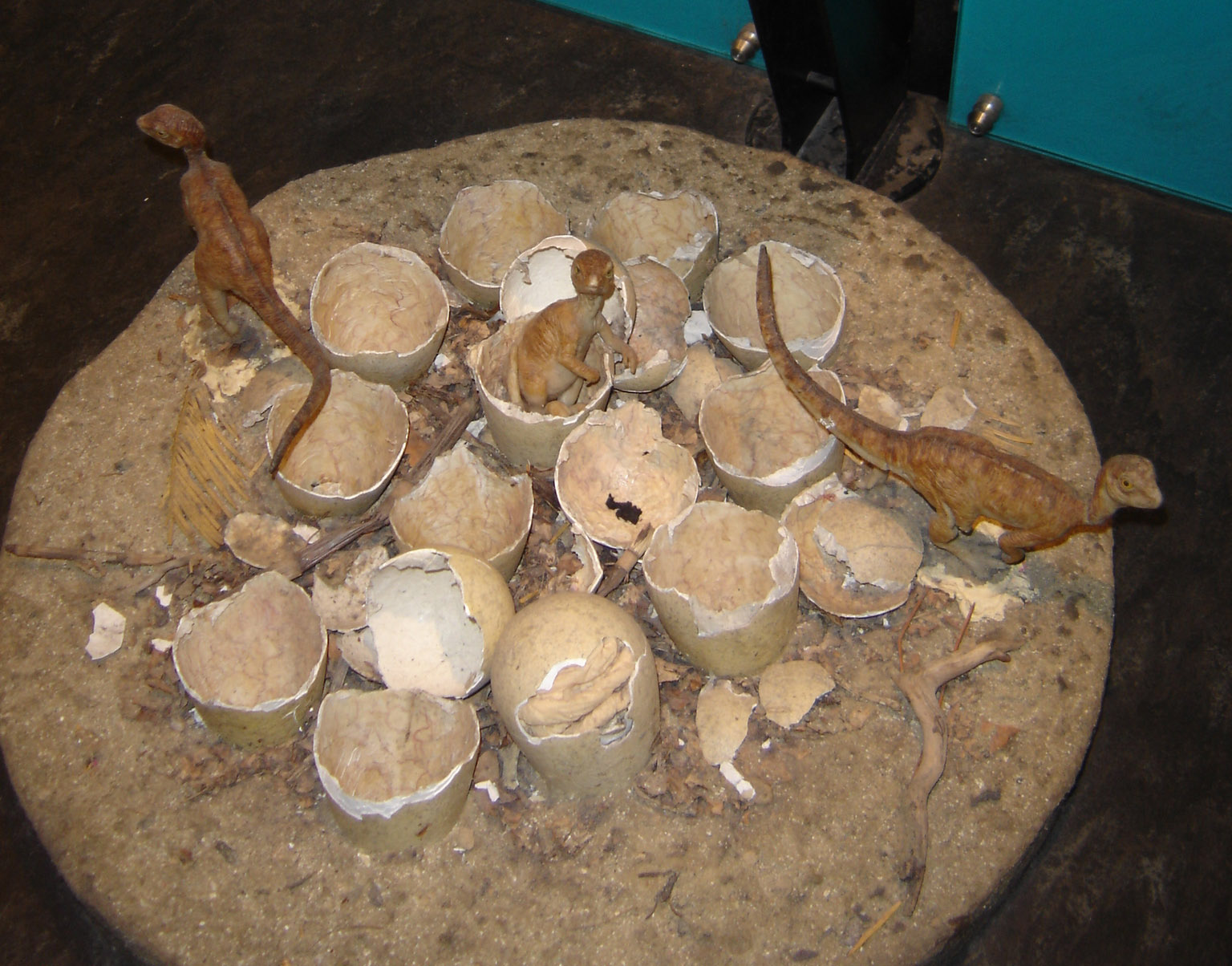
Model nest and hatchlings of Orodromeus makelai

Orodromeus was by Horner & Weishampel assigned to the Hypsilophodontidae, as the youngest known member. Today these are seen as an unnatural, paraphyletic, group, and Orodromeus is simply considered to be a basal member of the Euornithopoda. Brown et al. (2013) put it in the family Thescelosauridae and named a new subfamily (Orodrominae) after it.

== Palaeobiology ==
Because of the advanced development of the bones and teeth of the embryos, Horner concluded that the young of Orodromeus were precocial.

It has been speculated that this animal may have burrowed much like its relative Oryctodromeus, based upon the packing of their bones in situations where they typically would have been scattered.

Mallon et al. (2013) examined herbivore coexistence on the island continent of Laramidia, during the Late Cretaceous. It was concluded that small ornithischians like Orodromeus were generally restricted to feeding on vegetation at, or below the height of 1 meter.
