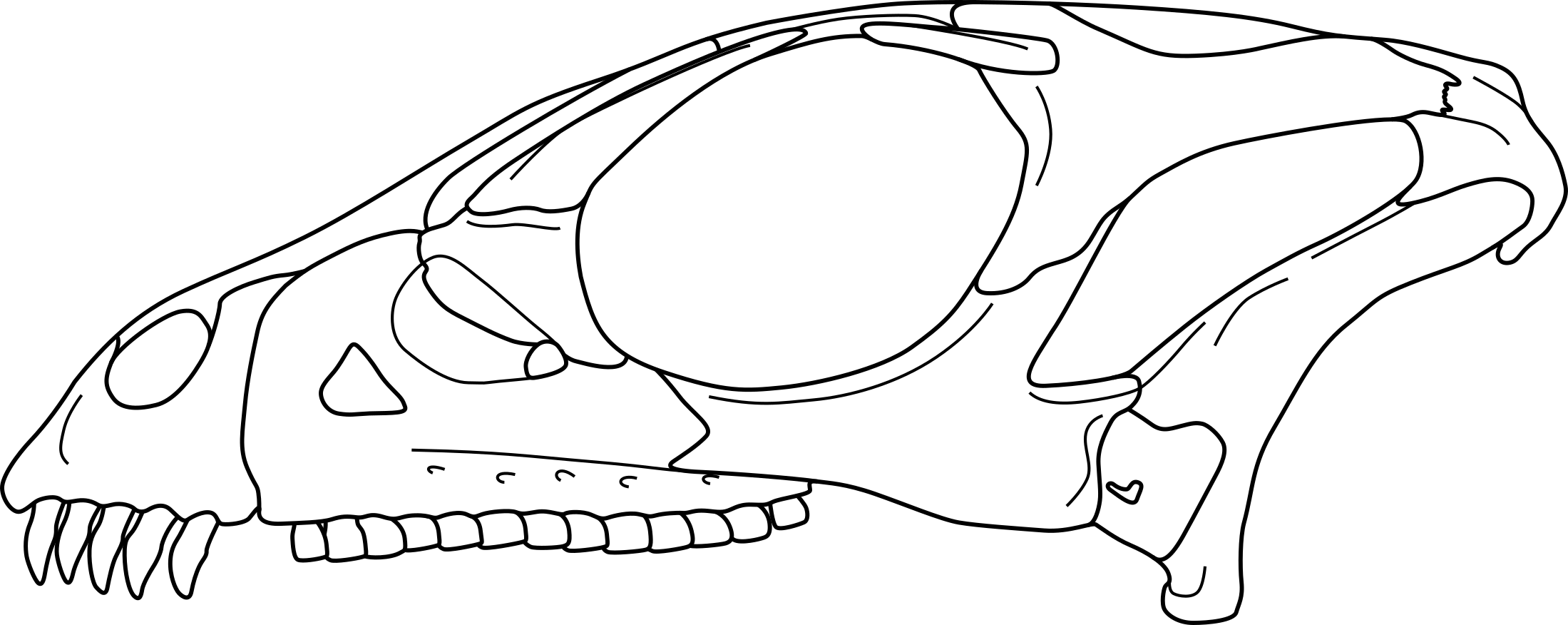
- Reconstructed skull of Haya specimen IGM 100/2017

Scientific classification
- Kingdom: Animalia
- Phylum: Chordata
- Class: Reptilia
- Clade: Dinosauria
- Clade: †Ornithischia
- Clade: †Pyrodontia
- Family: †Thescelosauridae
- Subfamily: †Thescelosaurinae
- Genus: †Haya; Makovicky et al., 2011
- Species: †H. griva

Binomial name
- †Haya griva Makovicky et al., 2011

= Haya griva =

Haya griva Temporal range: Late Cretaceous: Santonian-Campanian

Extinct genus of dinosaurs

Haya is an extinct genus of basal neornithischian dinosaur known from the Late Cretaceous of Mongolia.

== Description ==
Haya is known from several well-preserved specimens which collected in the Khugenetslavkant locality by the joint Mongolian Academy of Sciences from 2002 to 2007, from the Javkhlant Formation and a few from the Zos Canyon locality of the Gobi Desert. Both localities probably date to the Santonian-Campanian stages of the Late Cretaceous. The holotype IGM 100/2017 is composed of a complete and well preserved skull with some postcranial elements associated to it. Referred materials include IGM 100/1324, isolated left femur, IGM 100/2013, postcranial elements, IGM 100/2014, a crushed skull and postcranial elements, IGM 100/2015, a nearly complete postcranial skeleton, IGM 100/2016, a partial juvenile skull, IGM 100/2018, an isolated mandible with some teeth, IGM 100/2019, a nearly complete skull and skeleton and IGM 100/2020, postcranial fragments. One skeleton of Haya, IGM 100/2015, preserves a large mass of gastroliths.

== Etymology ==
Haya was first named by Peter J. Makovicky, Brandon M. Kilbourne, Rudyard W. Sadleir and Mark A. Norell in 2011 and the type species is Haya griva. The generic name and the specific name are both derived from the Sanskrit for the "Hayagriva" avatar of the Hindu god Vishnu, depicted with a horse head. This name refers to the elongate horse-like skull of Haya and the appearance of this deity in the Buddhist art of Mongolia.

== Phylogeny ==
A cladistic analysis found it to form a clade with Jeholosaurus and Changchunsaurus within Ornithopoda. Han et al. named this clade "Jeholosauridae" in 2012. The cladogram below from a 2019 study by Herne et al. shows Haya's placement within Jeholosauridae, as well as relationships to similar neornithischians.

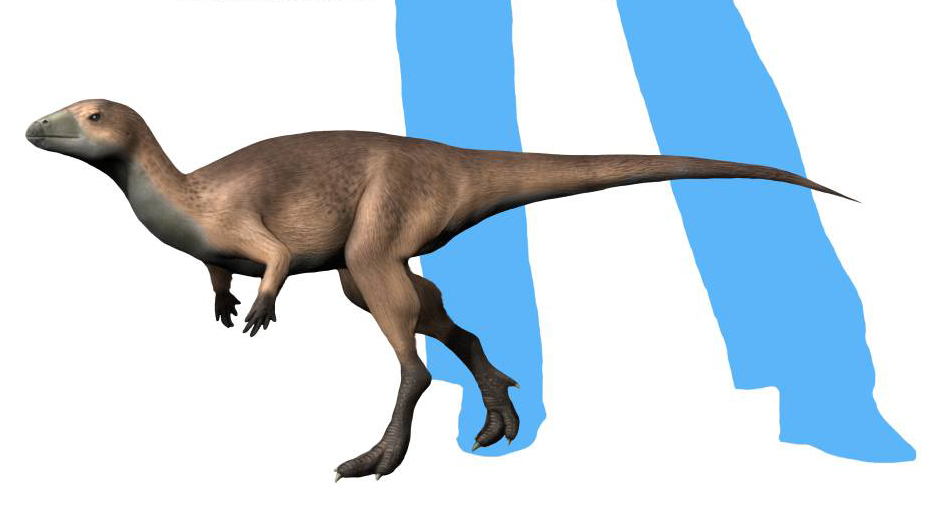
Life restoration

- Ornithischia
  - Heterodontosauridae
  - - Eocursor
    - - Thyreophora
      - Neornithischia
        - Lesothosaurus
        - - Agilisaurus
          - - - Hexinlusaurus
              - Yandusaurus
            - - - Nanosaurus
                - - Jeholosauridae
                    - Haya
                    - - Jeholosaurus
                      - Changchunsaurus
                  - Thescelosauridae
                    - - Orodromeus
                      - Koreanosaurus
                    - - Zephyrosaurus
                      - - Yueosaurus
                        - Thescelosaurus
              - Cerapoda
                - Marginocephalia
                - Ornithopoda
                  - Parksosaurus
                  - - Elasmaria
                      - Talenkauen
                      - - - Macrogryphosaurus
                          - Gasparinisaura
                        - - Galleonosaurus
                          - Leaellynasaura
                          - Anabisetia
                          - Diluvicursor
                    - Clypeodonta
                      - Hypsilophodon
                      - Iguanodontia
                        - Rhabdodontidae
                        - - Muttaburrasaurus
                          - - Tenontosaurus
                            - Dryomorpha

In 2021, Daniel E. Barta and Mark A. Norell carried out a detailed analysis of the phylogenetic position of Haya, recovering Haya outside of Jeholosauridae, and instead as part of Thescelosauridae.
