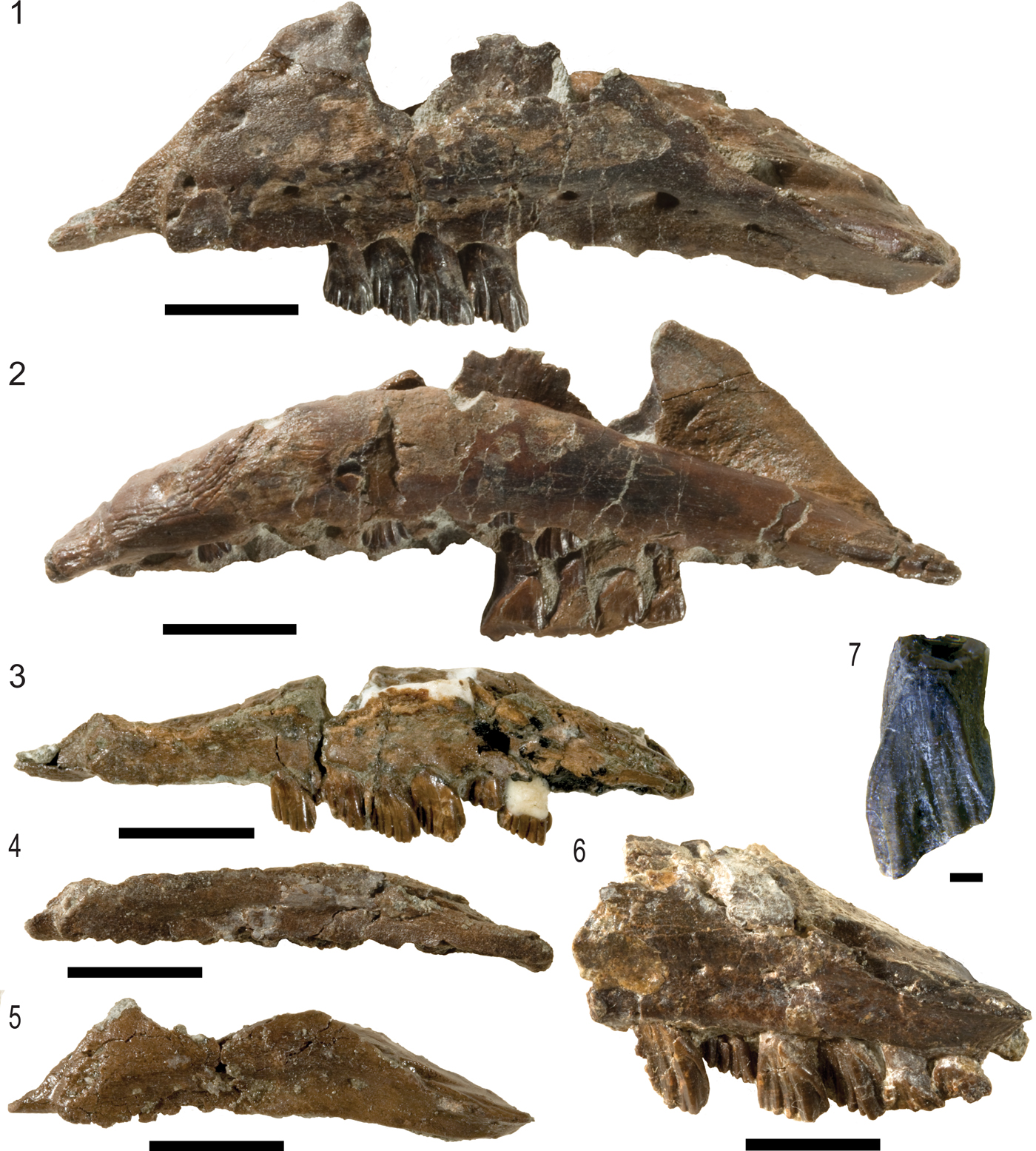
- Several maxillae and teeth specimens of Galleonosaurus

Scientific classification
- Kingdom: Animalia
- Phylum: Chordata
- Class: Reptilia
- Clade: Dinosauria
- Clade: †Ornithischia
- Clade: †Ornithopoda
- Clade: †Elasmaria
- Genus: †Galleonosaurus; Herne et al., 2019

Type species
- †Galleonosaurus dorisae Herne et al., 2019

= Galleonosaurus =

Galleonosaurus Temporal range: Early Cretaceous 125–112 Ma

Extinct genus of dinosaurs

Galleonosaurus (meaning "galleon lizard" as the upper jaw bone resembles an upturned galleon) is a genus of basal ornithopod dinosaur from the Wonthaggi Formation of the Gippsland region of Victoria, Australia. The type and only species is Galleonosaurus dorisae.

== Discovery and naming ==
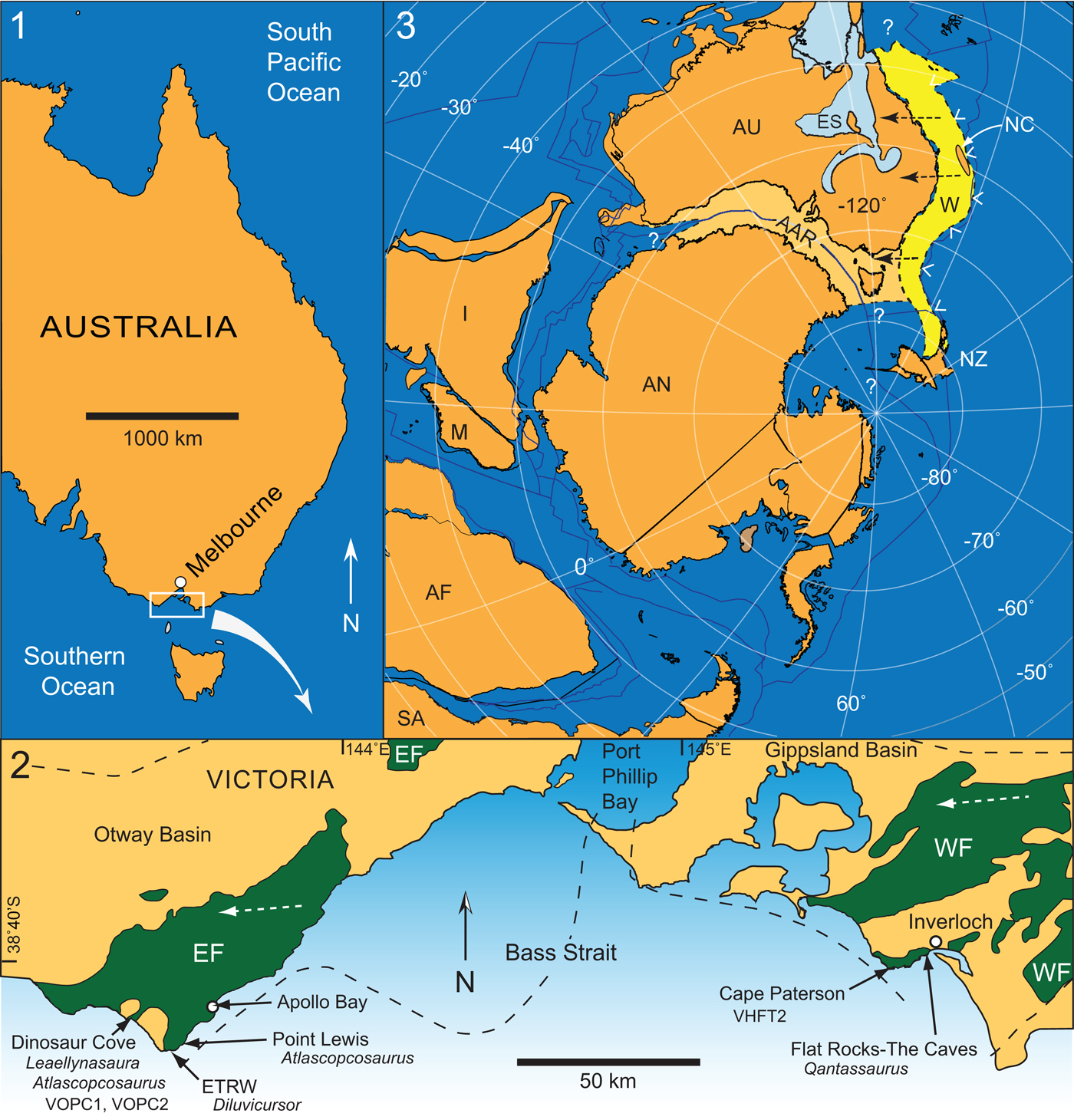
Map showing the location of the Flats Rocks and ETRW localities in Victoria

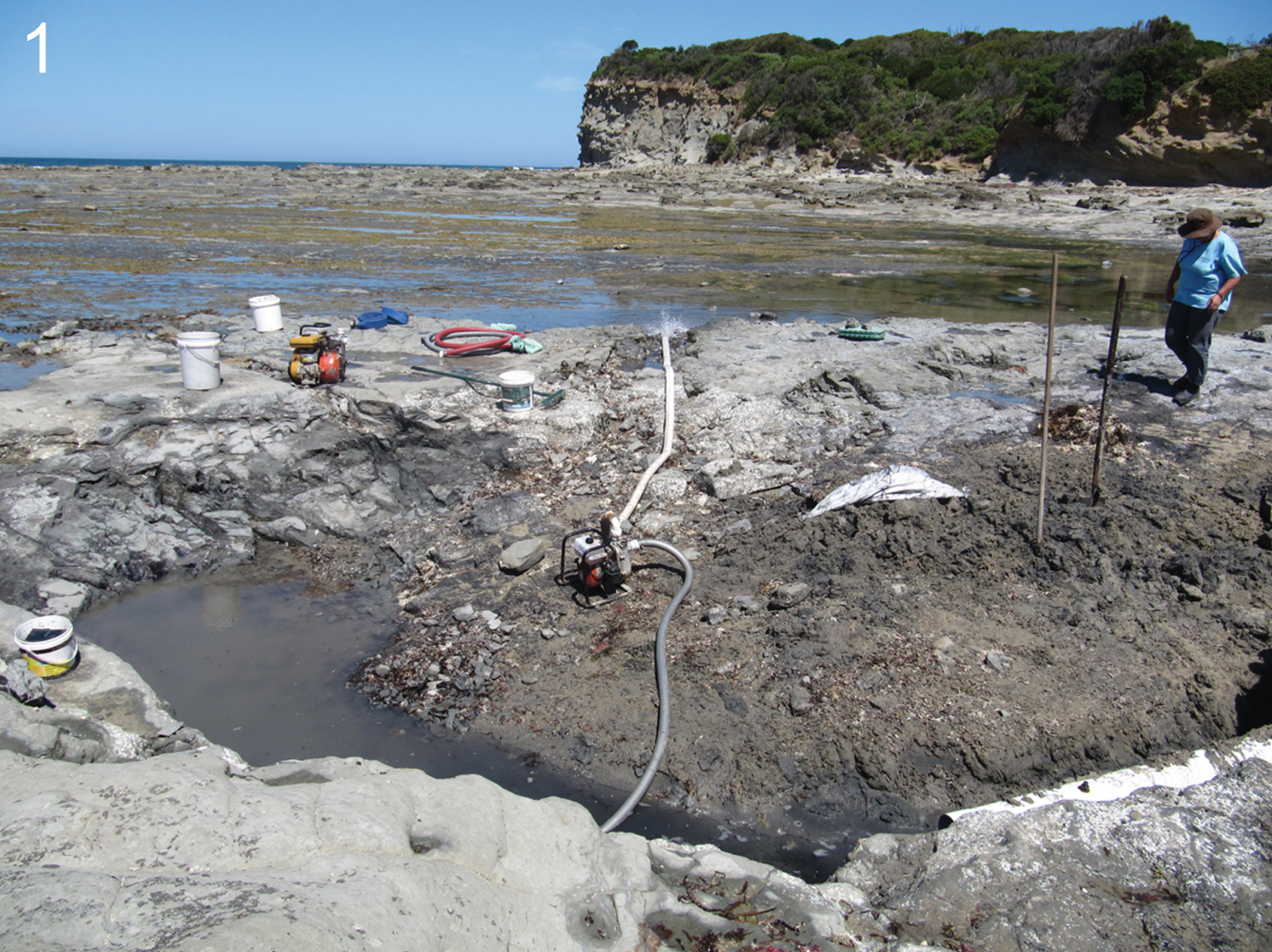
The Flats Rocks locality where the holotype was found

The original specimen that would form the basis for Galleonosaurus was discovered at the Flat Rocks locality of the Wonthaggi Formation in 2008 by palaeontologist Gerry Kool. This was the same site that the related Qantassaurus, named nine years earlier in 1999, had been found. Flat Rocks is thought to have been deposited 125 million years ago in the late Barremian age of the Cretaceous, and is today located near Inverloch, Victoria within the Bunurong Marine National Park, on a shoreline rock platform. During the Cretaceous, the area would've been at a far higher latitude than today, within the Antarctic Circle. After discovery, specimen was catalogued at the Melbourne Museum and studied by Matthew C. Herne. Some of the remains were first described in an unpublished thesis by Herne in 2014, where they considered to potentially represented a second species of the genus Leaellynasaura. He and colleagues would go on to instead name the specimen as the new genus and species Galleonosaurus dorisae in 2019, in a paper published in the Journal of Paleontology. It is the fifth named ornithopod from Victoria, following Atlascopcosaurus, Leaellynasaura, Qantassaurus, and Diluvicursor.

The generic name is derived from "galleon" (a type of large sailing ship) and "saurus" (New Latin from the Greek sauros for lizard), in reference to the appearance of the maxilla to the upturned hull of a galleon. The specific name dorisae was given in recognition of Doris Seegets-Villiers for her geological, palynological, and taphonomic work on the Flat Rocks fossil vertebrate locality. The holotype specimen is NMV P229196, a complete left maxilla with partial dentition. In addition to this specimen, several other specimens from Flat Rocks were referred to Galleonosaurus. These include: NMV P212845, a partial left maxilla lacking erupted dentition; NMV P208178, a partial left maxilla with erupted dentition; NMV P208113, a worn right maxillary tooth; NMV P208523, worn left maxillary tooth; and NMV P209977, partial left maxilla, lacking erupted dentition. In addition, the specimen NMV P186440, collected from the nearby locality The Caves, was referred to the taxon. It consists of a posterior portion of the left maxilla, left palatine, and a fragment of the left lacrimal.

Additional remains have been suggested to belong to Galleonosaurus. Multiple types of dentary have been recovered from the Wonthaggi Formation, one of which is designated as Victorian Ornithopod Dentary morphotype 3, or VOD3. These dentaries possesses an elongate form and a large number of tooth positions (alveoli), and was therefore tentatively considered likely to belong to Galleonosaurus; however, without overlapping material it is impossible to confirm. Additionally, specimens resembling both Galleonosaurus maxillae and VOD3 dentaries are known from the Eric The Red West (ETRW) fossil site of the Eumeralla Formation, also hailing from Victoria but dating to several million years later. These were described by Ruairidh J Duncan and colleagues in 2021, in a study attempting to better catalogue the diversity of ornithopods known from cranial remains at the site. The two left maxillae, NMV P252568 and NMV P233966, were discovered in 2016 and 2013 respectively and were assigned to cf. Galleonosaurus dorisae, designating them as a tentative rather than confident assignment. The unprecedented gap in time between the two localities prevent definite assignment, but the remains were so similar to previous Galleonosaurus remains that they weren't considered grounds to name a new species. Three distinct postcranial morphotypes are also known from Eumerella, including the holotype of Diluvicursor; it is considered very likely one of the three represents Galleonosaurus, but without overlapping remains it is unknown which.

== Description ==
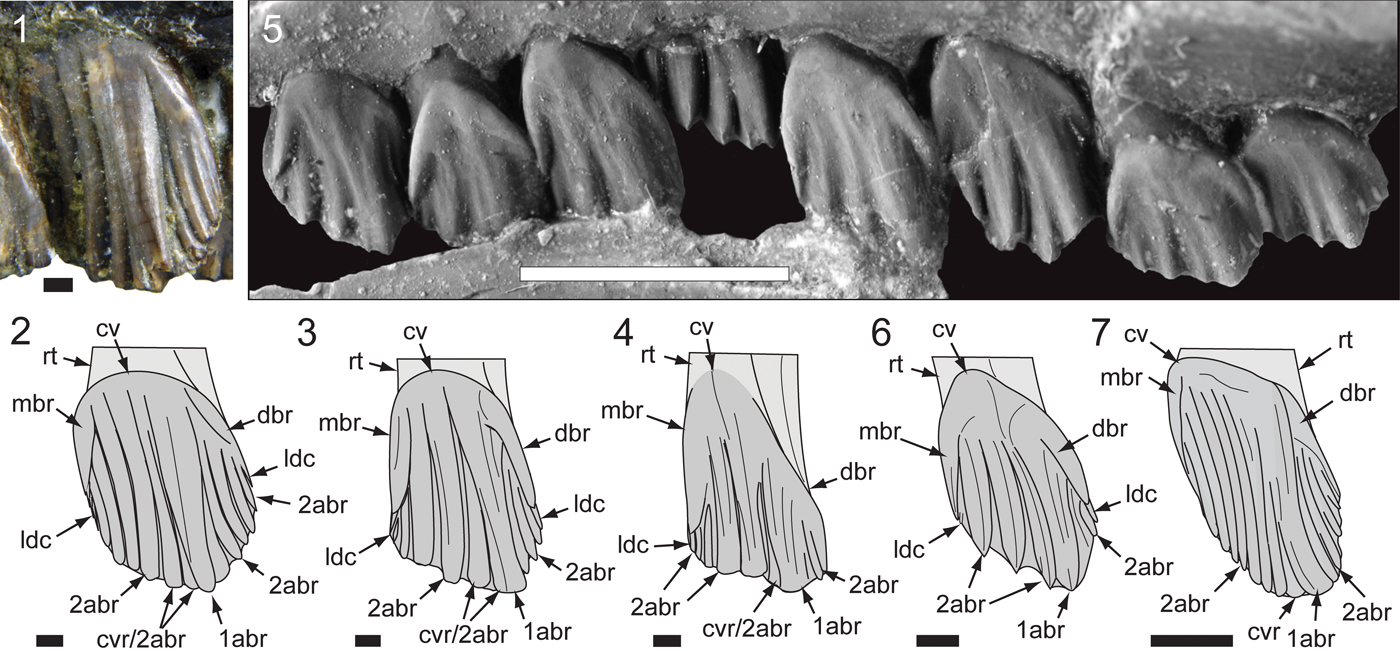
Comparison between the tooth anatomy of Galleonosaurus, 4, and related ornithopods

Galleonosaurus would have been a small, bipedal animal. It is characterised by five potential autapomorphies: ascending ramus of the maxilla has two slot-like foramina on the anterior (front) margin that communicate with the neurovascular tract; neurovascular tract bifurcates internally to exit at two anteroventral (front, on the bottom) maxillary foramina; lingual (inner) margin of maxillary tooth roots in midregion of tooth row form an S-bend at their bases; posterior third of maxilla on some, but not all, specimens deflects posterolaterally (backwards, to the side) at an abrupt kink; and lateral end of palatine lateral ramus forms a hatchet-shaped flange. Part of the lacrimal bone is known, but unlike the maxilla it is too fragmented to determine much of its anatomy.

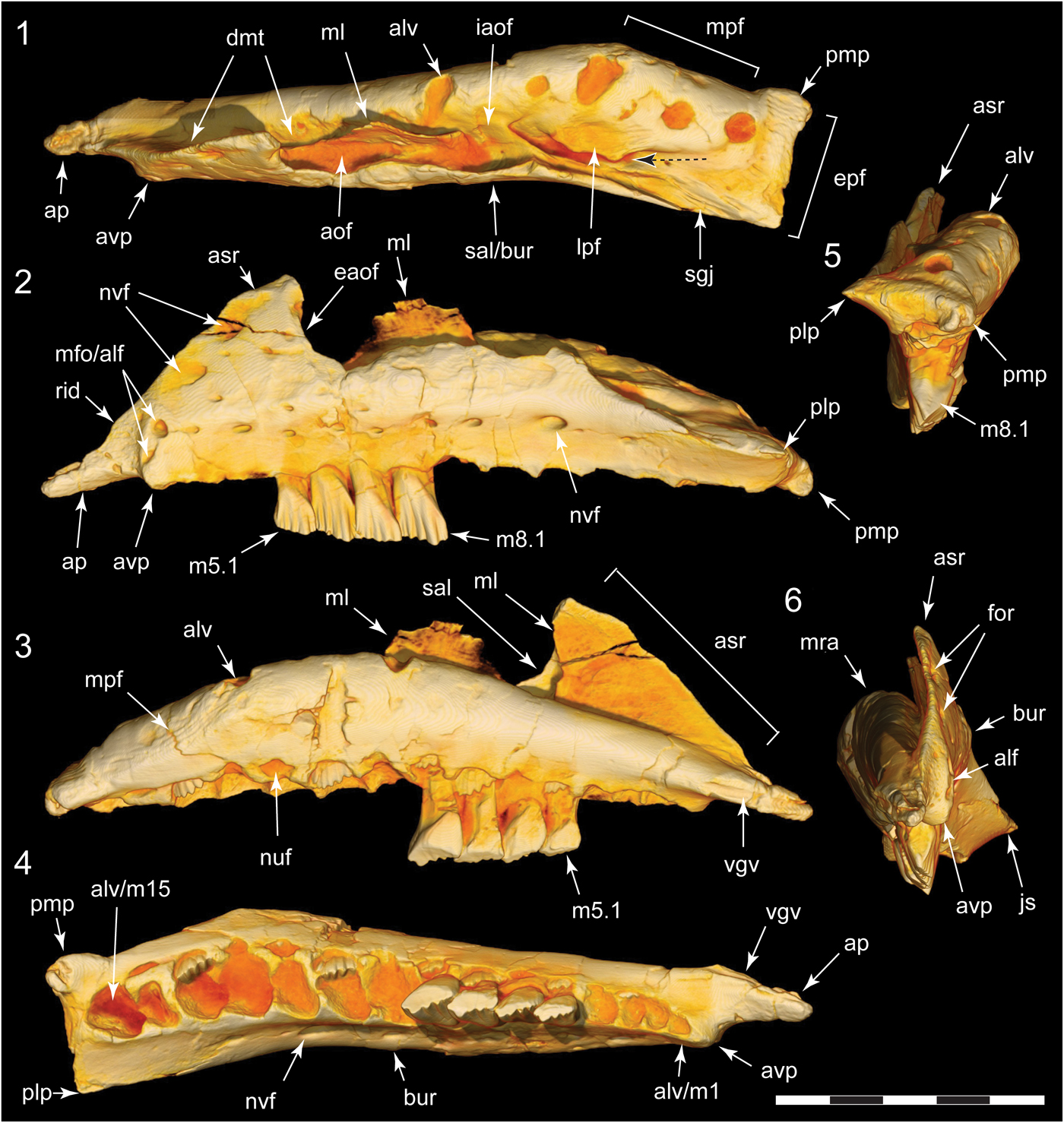
Holotype maxilla specimen of Galleonosaurus, rendered as a 3D model at several angles.

Among the known specimens of Galleonosaurus, a small degree of variation has been observed. Some specimens including the holotype have fifteen alveoli, or tooth positions, whereas others have thirteen or fourteen, though show indications of small or developing ones. The teeth themselves also demonstrate some variation, though it is only minor. Additionally, an abrupt kink in the jawbone is present on some but all specimens; likewise, one specimen has a pyramid-shaped peak on the top edge, whereas the others are smooth and rounded in this area. The latter two traits do not differ along lines of age, and so it has been suggested it may represent evidence of subspecific variation in the species or sexual dimorphism. Neither hypothesis, however, can be clearly tested, leaving the nature of the morphological variation unclear.

== Classification ==
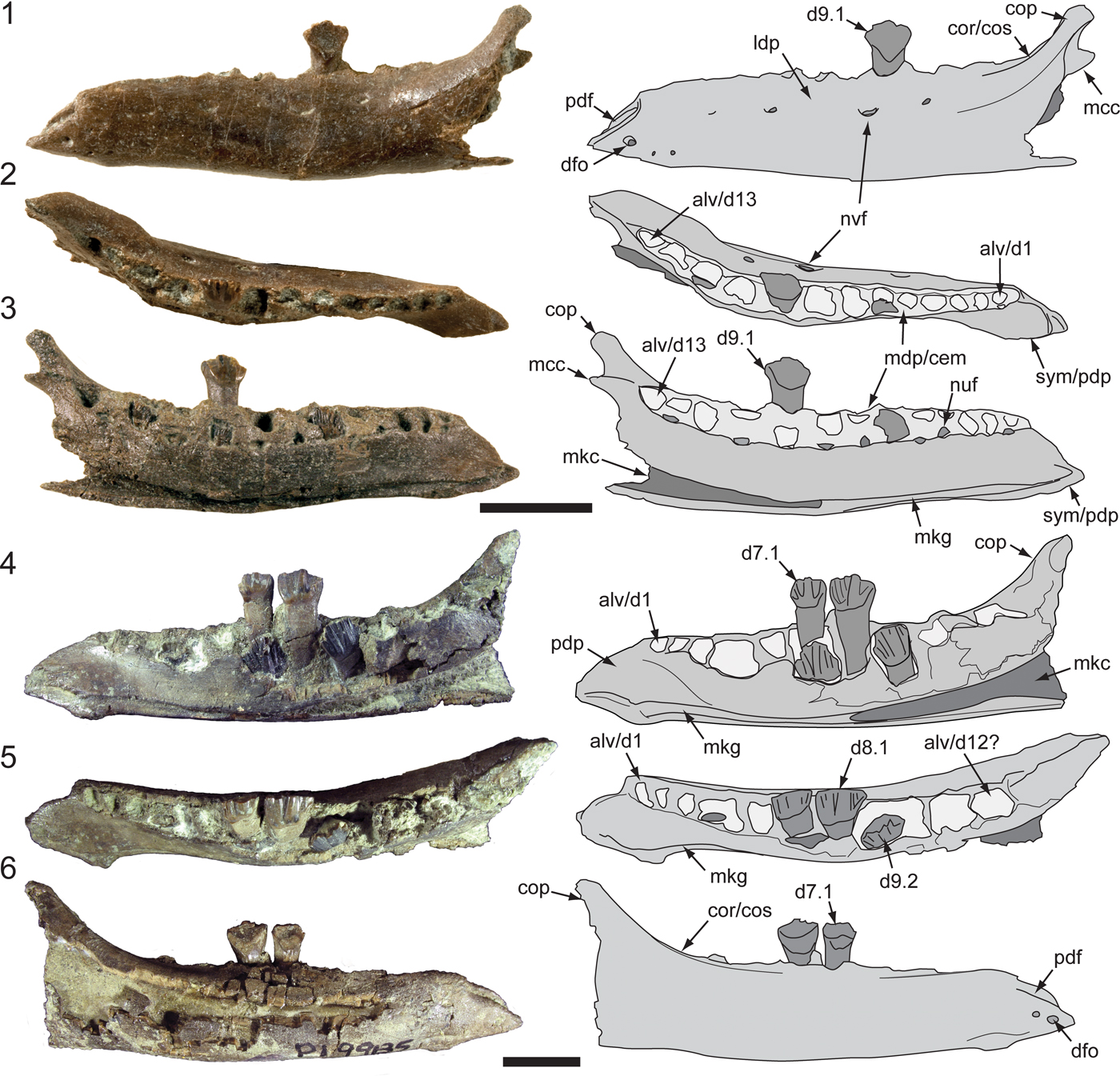
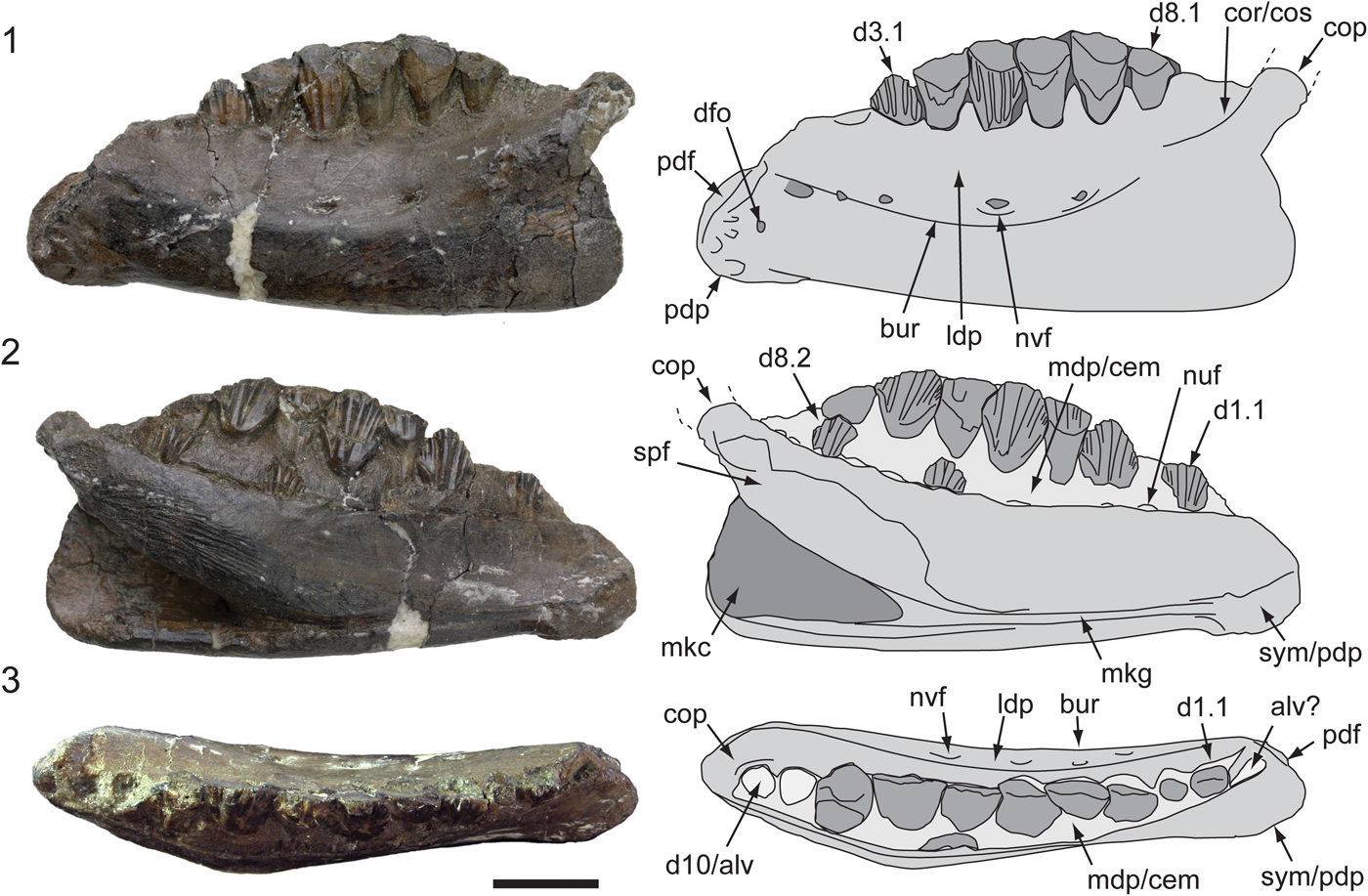
Dentaries of the VOD3 morphotype (left) and Qantassaurus (right); either could belong to Galleonosaurus, but VOD3 is thought to match its maxilla more closely

The systematics of Victorian ornithopods remains complicated. In the Wonthaggi Formation, two types of maxilla are known (Galleonosaurus and VOM4) alongside three types of dentary (Qantassaurus, VOD2, and VOD3), while in the Eumeralla Formation three types of maxillae are known (Leaellynasaura, Atlascopcosaurus, and Galleonosaurus) alongside two types of dentary (VOD3 and VOD4) and three types of postcrania (Diluvicursor, VOPC1, and VOPC2). It is likely that the dentaries and postcrania belong to the same species known from the maxillae; however, which match up is impossible to know without overlapping remains. Thus, it is possible that either of Qantassaurus or Diluvicursor merely represent other parts of the same animal as Galleonosaurus. Additionally, it has been noted that Galleonosaurus and Leaellynasaura are so anatomically similar that they could be considered two species within a single genus, or even simply variation within a single species.

To assess the phylogenetic position of Galleonosaurus, the 2019 study by Herne and colleagues performed a phylogenetic analysis. This found Galleonosaurus to be a member of the clade Elasmaria, being related to other Gondwanan ornithopods. This result was supported by the observation of multiple shared anatomical traits between the elasmarian taxa. The material proved too fragmentary, however, to resolve more precise relationships between these species, though dental similarities indicate a potential close relationship to Leaellynasaura and Atlascopcosaurus. The latter conclusion was supported by the 2021 study of additional remains from all three genera by Duncan and colleagues, finding all three to be relatively similar.

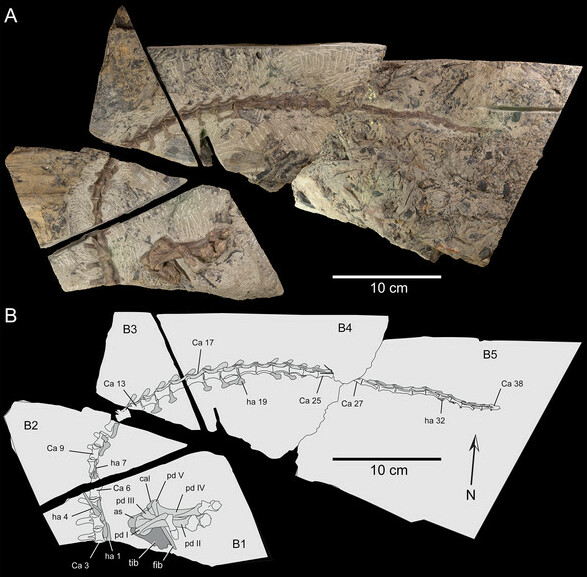
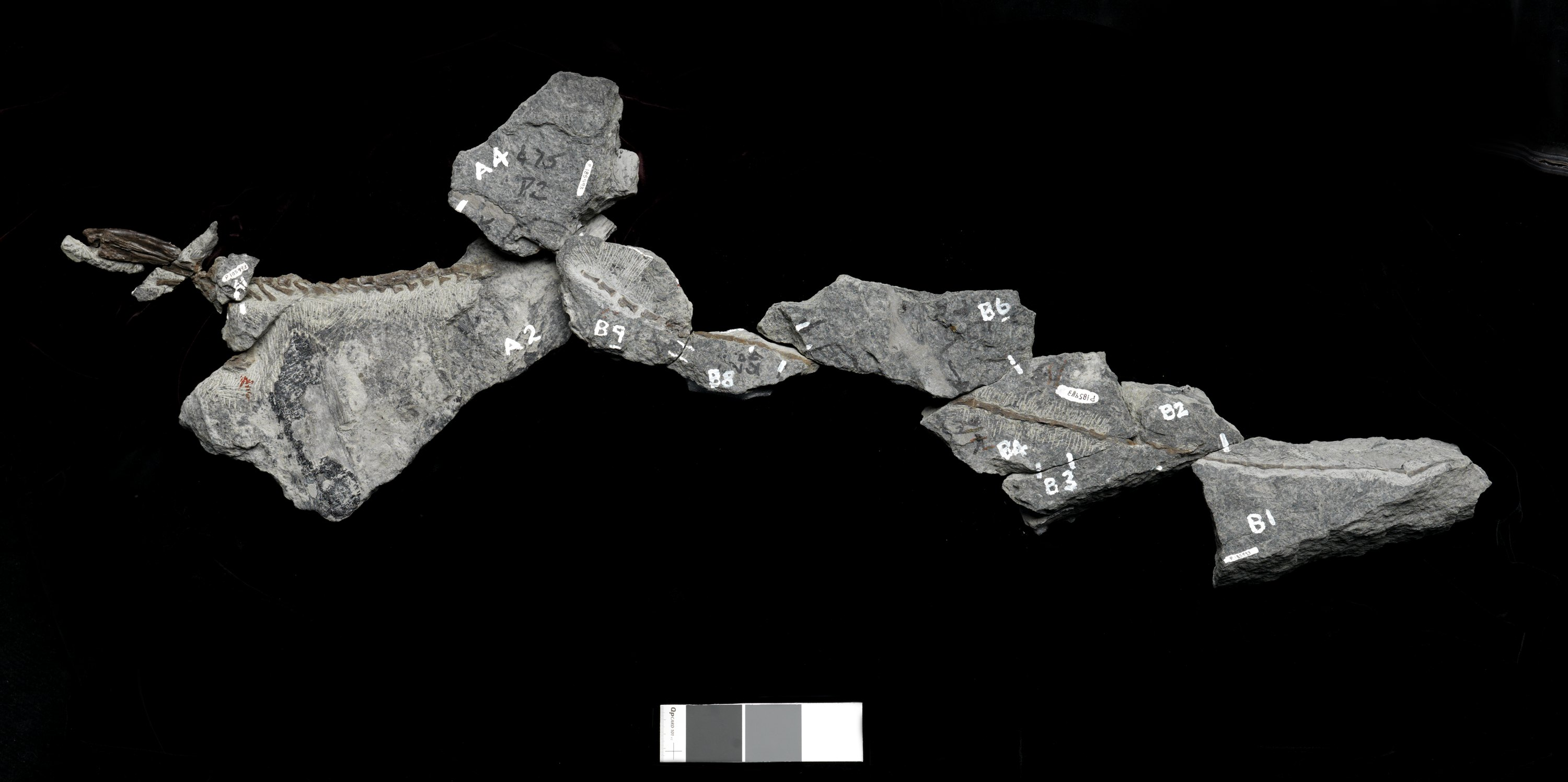
Postcrania of multiple species are known from the Eumeralla Formation, including the holotype of Diluvicursor (left) and the long tailed VOPC1 morphotype (right); either may belong to Galleonosaurus in lack of overlapping remains

The cladogram below shows results from the analysis by Herne et al., 2019:

- Ornithischia
  - Heterodontosauridae
  - - Eocursor
    - - Thyreophora
      - Neornithischia
        - Lesothosaurus
        - - Agilisaurus
          - - - Hexinlusaurus
              - Yandusaurus
            - - - Nanosaurus
                - - Jeholosauridae
                  - Thescelosauridae
              - Cerapoda
                - Marginocephalia
                - Ornithopoda
                  - Parksosaurus
                  - - Elasmaria
                      - Talenkauen
                      - - - Macrogryphosaurus
                          - Gasparinisaura
                        - - Galleonosaurus
                          - Leaellynasaura
                          - Anabisetia
                          - Diluvicursor
                    - Clypeodonta
                      - Hypsilophodon
                      - Iguanodontia

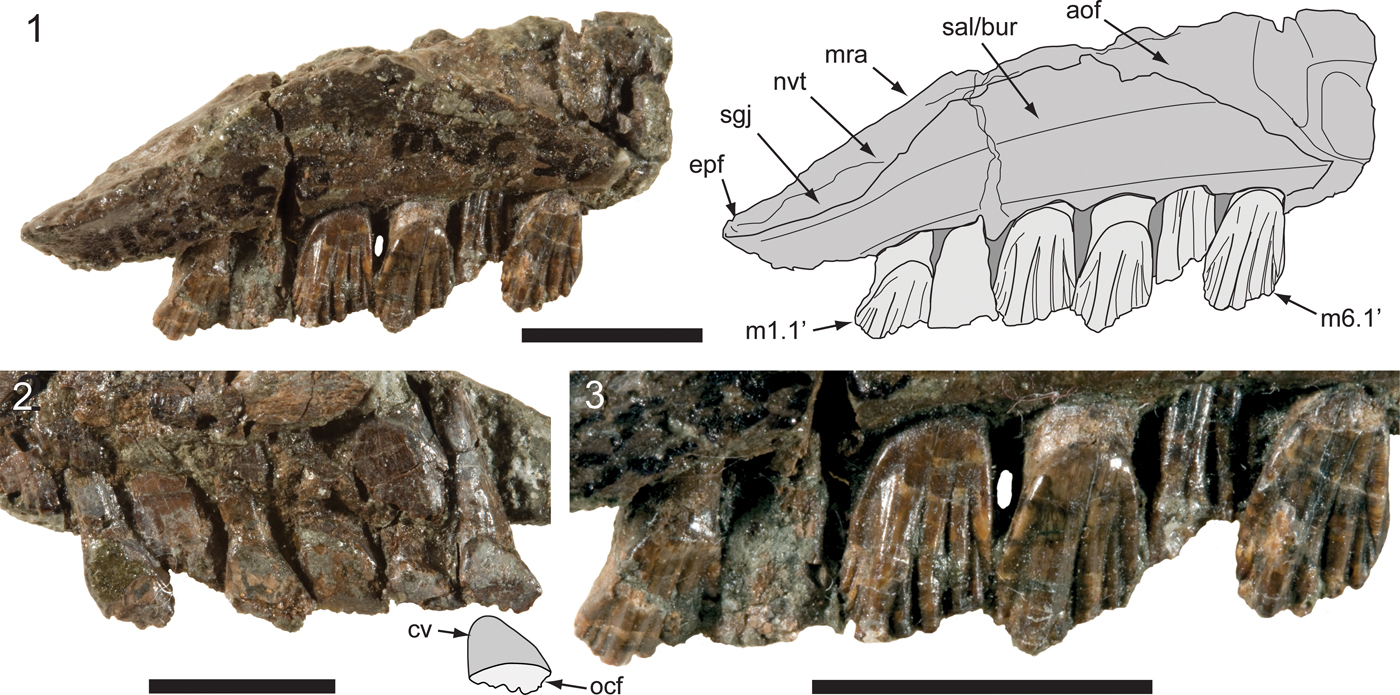
Maxilla specimen designated as VOM4; it may indicate a recent common ancestry of Atlascopcosaurus and Galleonosaurus

Inferences have been made about the evolution of Victorian ornithopods, including Galleonosaurus. The apparent presence of the genus in multiple formations, in addition to other potentially overlapping taxa like Qantassaurus and Atlascopcosaurus, indicates a remarkably conservative morphology in the 25 million year timespan represented by the Strzelecki Group (including the Wonthaggi Formation) and Eumerella Formation, something generally unexpected in the fossil record. This is indicative of a lacking degree of adaptive pressure upon the organisms to change in response to the environment, in spite of evidence of significant floral change in the time between both deposits. Another factor may have been harsh polar conditions constraining anatomical diversity. In addition to these broad trends, possible scenarios of speciation have been proposed. A maxilla specimen from the Wonthaggi Group, designated as VOM4, shows a mixture of traits known from Atlascopcosaurus and Galleonosaurus. Though considered somewhat more similar to the former, it may indicate the lineages of both genera had only very recently diverged from a common ancestor in the Late Barremian. Likewise, the extreme similarity of Leaellynasaura and cf. Galleonosaurus in the Eumerella, as well as the lack of remains resembling the former in earlier rocks, could indicate that Leaellynasaura had only recently split from the Galleonosaurus lineage in the time between that represented by the two geologic units.

== Palaeoecology ==
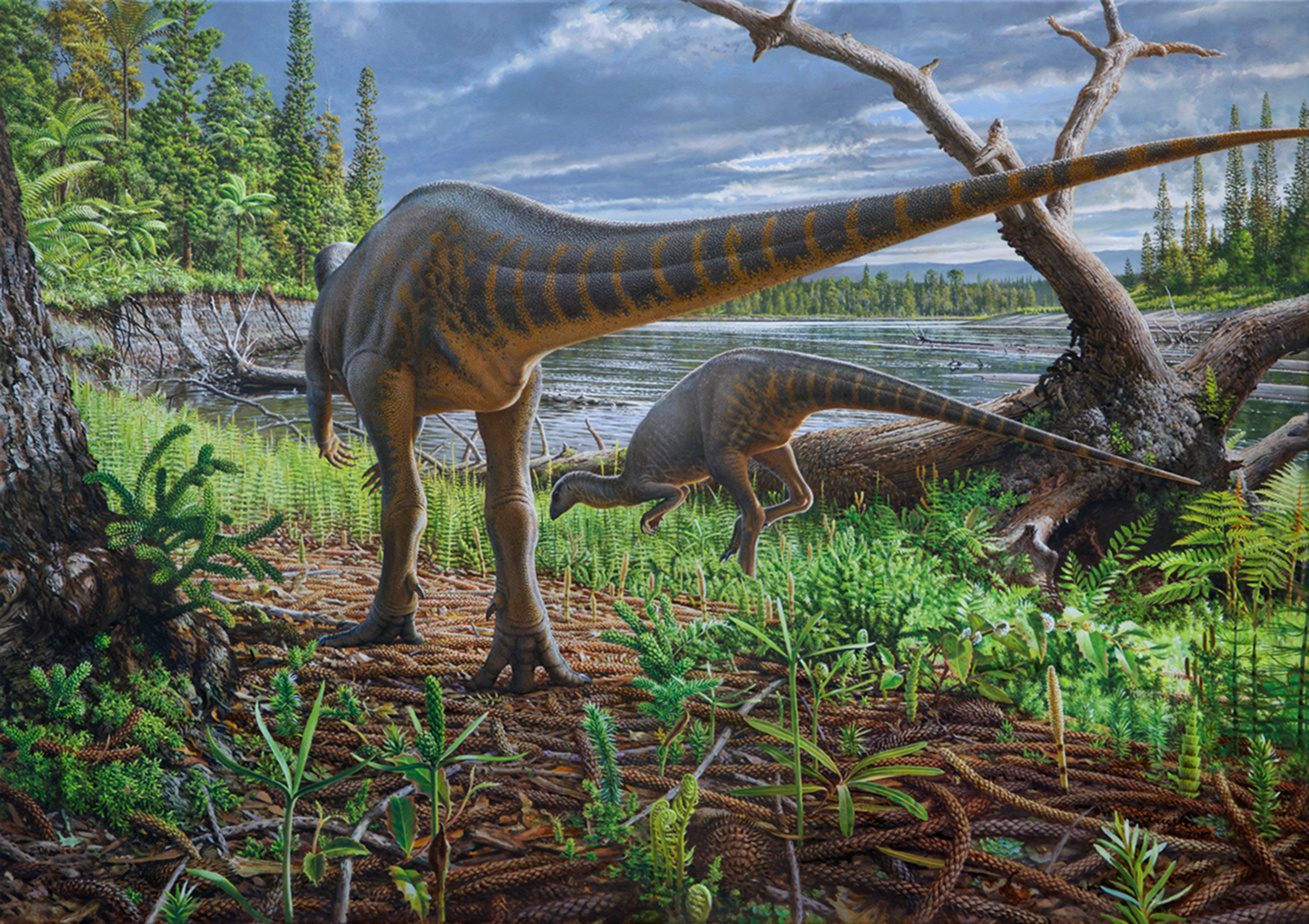
Reconstruction of ornithopods in the Victorian rift valley of the Early Cretaceous

Galleonosaurus remains have been found in both the late Barremian Wonthaggi Formation of the Strzelecki Group as well as the Albian aged Eumeralla Formation, around twelve million years or more later. During the Early Cretaceous period, the area of Victoria these units hail from would have been part of a rift valley between the continents of Australia and Antarctica, and would have been a much higher latitude, within the Antarctic Circle. Volcanic activity from the shifting continents fed a cool, temperate ecosystem of rivers and shallow lakes isolated from the rest of the Australian continent. Large changes in the flora of Victoria would have occurred across this timescale, with gymnosperms and deciduous seed ferns common in the Strzelecki Group declining in favour of broadleaf plants and dominant angiosperms (flowering plants) by the time of the Eumeralla formation. Local ornithopods such as Galleonosaurus appear to have been able to survive these large changes in their ecosystem, as they remain speciose and conservative in morphology across a vast span of time.

Isolation from the rest of the continent and the globe, aside from Antarctica, created an unusual fauna. During the earlier Wonthaggi fauna, Galleonosaurus would've lived with fellow small ornithopod Qantassaurus, a potential an early representative of the genus Atlascopcosaurus (itself a possible synonym of Qantassaurus), and a larger species of ornithopod represented by an isolated femur. Other taxa include the giant temnospondyl Koolasuchus, an aquatic predator and the last member of a lineage that had long since gone extinct elsewhere in the world, the possible ankylosaur Serendipaceratops, and several species of primitive mammal. A more complete picture of the fauna is known from the Eumeralla Formation. Koolasuchus appears to have gone extinct, replaced by crocodyliform reptiles, and dinosaurs include predatory megaraptorans and herbivorous elaphrosaurs. Conspicuously absent are large herbivores such as sauropods or large bodied ornithopods as are known from further North in Australia; though it is possible they simply haven't been found, or were subject to a preservational bias, the lack of even fragments such as teeth indicate they may have simply been absent from the ecosystem altogether. It has been suggested that the short growing season of the polar region may have prevented larger herbivores from surviving in the ecosystem.
