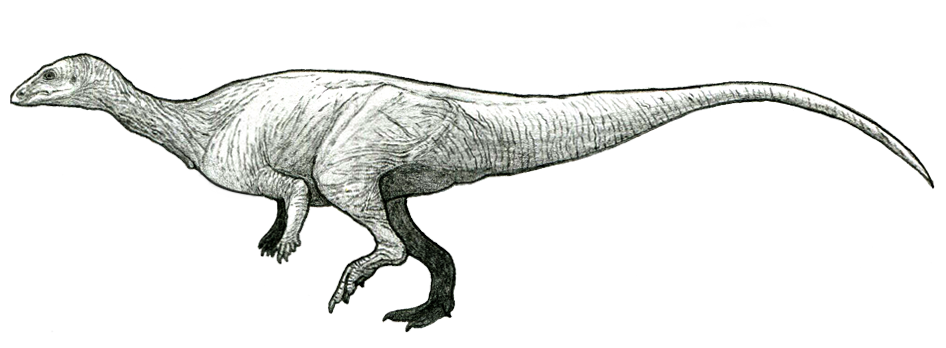
- Life reconstruction

Scientific classification
- Kingdom: Animalia
- Phylum: Chordata
- Class: Reptilia
- Clade: Dinosauria
- Clade: †Ornithischia
- Clade: †Ornithopoda
- Clade: †Elasmaria
- Genus: †Macrogryphosaurus; Calvo et al. 2007
- Species: †M. gondwanicus

Binomial name
- †Macrogryphosaurus gondwanicus Calvo et al. 2007

= Macrogryphosaurus =

Macrogryphosaurus Temporal range: Coniacian ~93–89 Ma

Extinct genus of dinosaurs

Macrogryphosaurus (meaning "big enigmatic lizard") is a genus of elasmarian dinosaur from the Coniacian-aged (Upper Cretaceous) Sierra Barrosa Formation (Neuquén Group) of Argentina in Patagonia. It was described by Jorge Calvo and colleagues in 2007, with M. gondwanicus as the type and only species.

== Discovery and naming ==
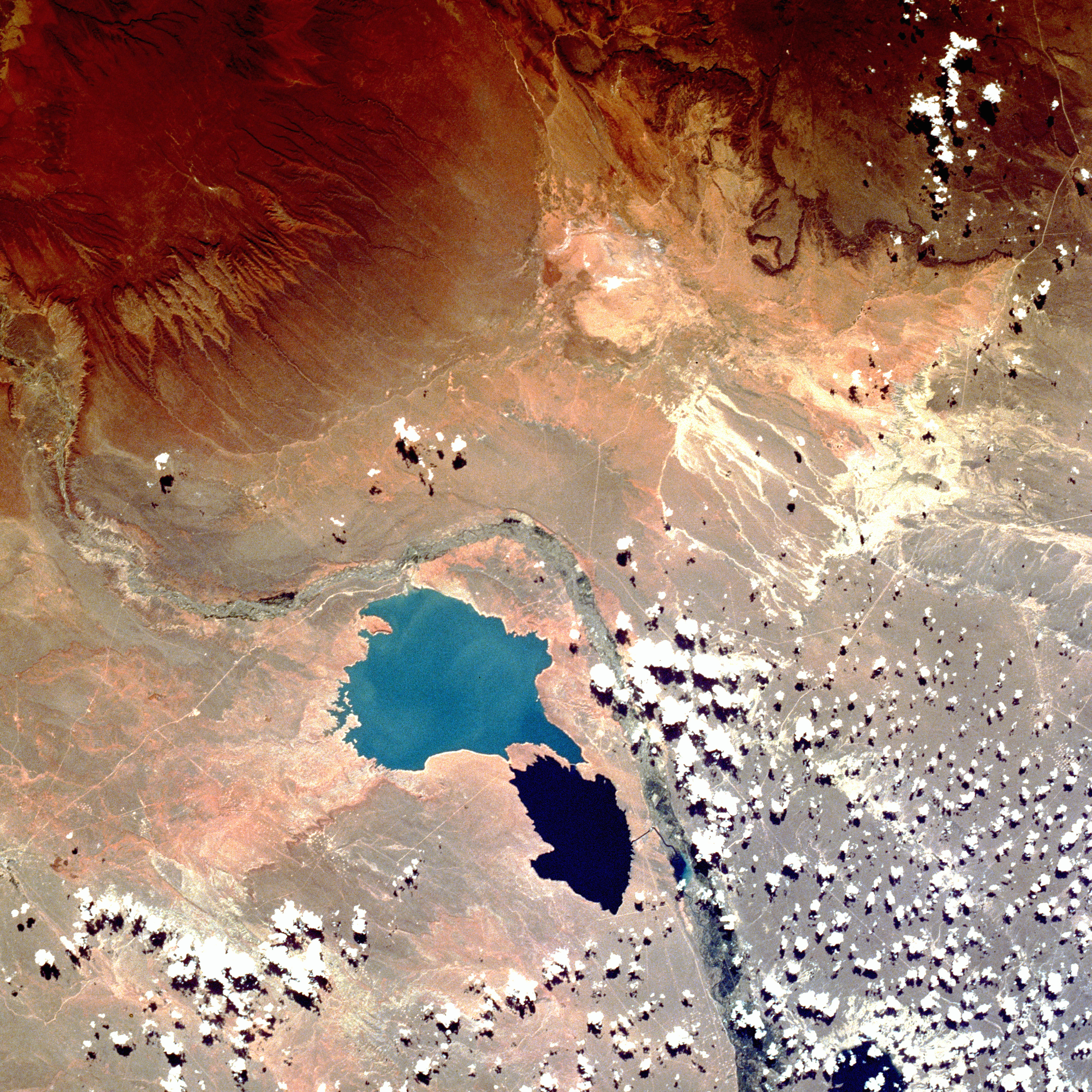
Satellite image of the terrain of the Neuquén Group, the geologic unit Macrogryphosaurus is from

In May 1999, during field work at Mari Menuco Lake, Argentina (sixty kilometres northwest of Neuquén) conducted by the National University of Comahue, an articulated, nearly complete dinosaur skeleton was discovered and excavated. It was brought to the attention of the palaeontologists by young boy Rafael Moyano, who had discovered it. Originally reported to hail from the Portezuelo Formation of the Neuquén Group, its locality was later revised to be in the Sierra Barrosa Formation of the same geologic group. This unit is dated to the Coniacian age of the Late Cretaceous. Noted for bony plates on its thorax, it was identified as a large species of ornithopod.

The species would be described and named Macrogryphosaurus gondwanicus in 2007, in a study authored by Jorge O. Calvo, Juan D. Porfiri, and Fernando E. Novas. Its generic name was derived from the Greek macro, meaning large, grypho, meaning enigmatic, and saurus, meaning lizard. The specific epithet gondwanicus refers to the ancient continent of Gondwana. The holotype specimen, MUCPv-32, consists of an essentially complete set of vertebra, a number of ribs, four mineralized thoracic plates, both sides of the pectoral girdle, and a sternum. The individual is considered to have been an adult. The preservation of the fossil was described by Dr. Stephen F. Poropat as "amazing" in nature.

Subsequent research has not referred any other specimens to the species. However, in 2016, a study was published on MAU-Pv-PH-458, a fragmentary dorsal neural arch from the Plottier Formation of northern Argentina. The bone is the northernmost record of an ornithopod in South America. It was not determined to belong to a Macrogryphosaurus, but noted to be from an animal of similar size and anatomy, and from approximately the same geographic and stratigraphic location, though it lived at a slightly earlier time. Other indeterminate ornithopod specimens from Argentina similarly indicate animals of similar size to the taxon. M. gondwanicus received a complete osteology in 2020, a study published in Cretaceous Research by Sebastián Rozadilla, Penélope Cruzado-Caballero, Jorge O. Calvo. This described the anatomy of the species in much more thoroughly and investigating its classification and biomechanics under a more modern lens. They considered the genus to be of importance, due to being the largest known elasmarian species, and for the completeness of its known remains, informing on the anatomy of the group.

== Description ==
Size comparison

Macrogryphosaurus has been noted for its large size compared to other South American ornithopods. It has been estimated to have been around 6 metres (20 ft) in length, though the only known individual may not have been fully grown. Gregory S. Paul estimated the length of this specimen at 5 m (16 ft) in length and 300 kg (660 lb) in body mass. As such, it is the largest species of South American ornithopod outside of Hadrosauridae, and the largest species of elasmarian. Approaching the size of many more derived iguanodontian ornithopods, it is, compared to these derived taxa, much more graceful and lightly built in form. One of the most remarked upon features of the taxon is its mineralized thoracic plates, also referred to as intercostal plates. These are a series of plates along the side of the torso, shared with a handful of other ornithischians such as Talenkauen, Thescelosaurus, and Hypsilophodon. Along with a fused, birdlike sternum, its short torso would have been rather stiff in nature. This, alongside its relatively elongate neck and coelurosaur-like tail, gave it a rather unique form compared to that documented in other ornithischian dinosaurs.

== Classification ==
Phylogenetic analysis indicates that it is related to Talenkauen, and Calvo and colleagues proposed a new clade, Elasmaria, for the two genera.

The cladogram below results from analysis by Herne et al., 2019.

- Ornithischia
  - Heterodontosauridae
  - - Eocursor
    - - Thyreophora
      - Neornithischia
        - Lesothosaurus
        - - Agilisaurus
          - - - Hexinlusaurus
              - Yandusaurus
            - - - Nanosaurus
                - - Jeholosauridae
                    - Haya
                    - - Jeholosaurus
                      - Changchunsaurus
                  - Thescelosauridae
                    - - Orodromeus
                      - Koreanosaurus
                    - - Zephyrosaurus
                      - - Yueosaurus
                        - Thescelosaurus
              - Cerapoda
                - Marginocephalia
                - Ornithopoda
                  - Parksosaurus
                  - - Elasmaria
                      - Talenkauen
                      - - - Macrogryphosaurus
                          - Gasparinisaura
                        - - Galleonosaurus
                          - Leaellynasaura
                          - Anabisetia
                          - Diluvicursor
                    - Clypeodonta
                      - Hypsilophodon
                      - Iguanodontia
                        - Rhabdodontidae
                        - - Muttaburrasaurus
                          - - Tenontosaurus
                            - Dryomorpha
