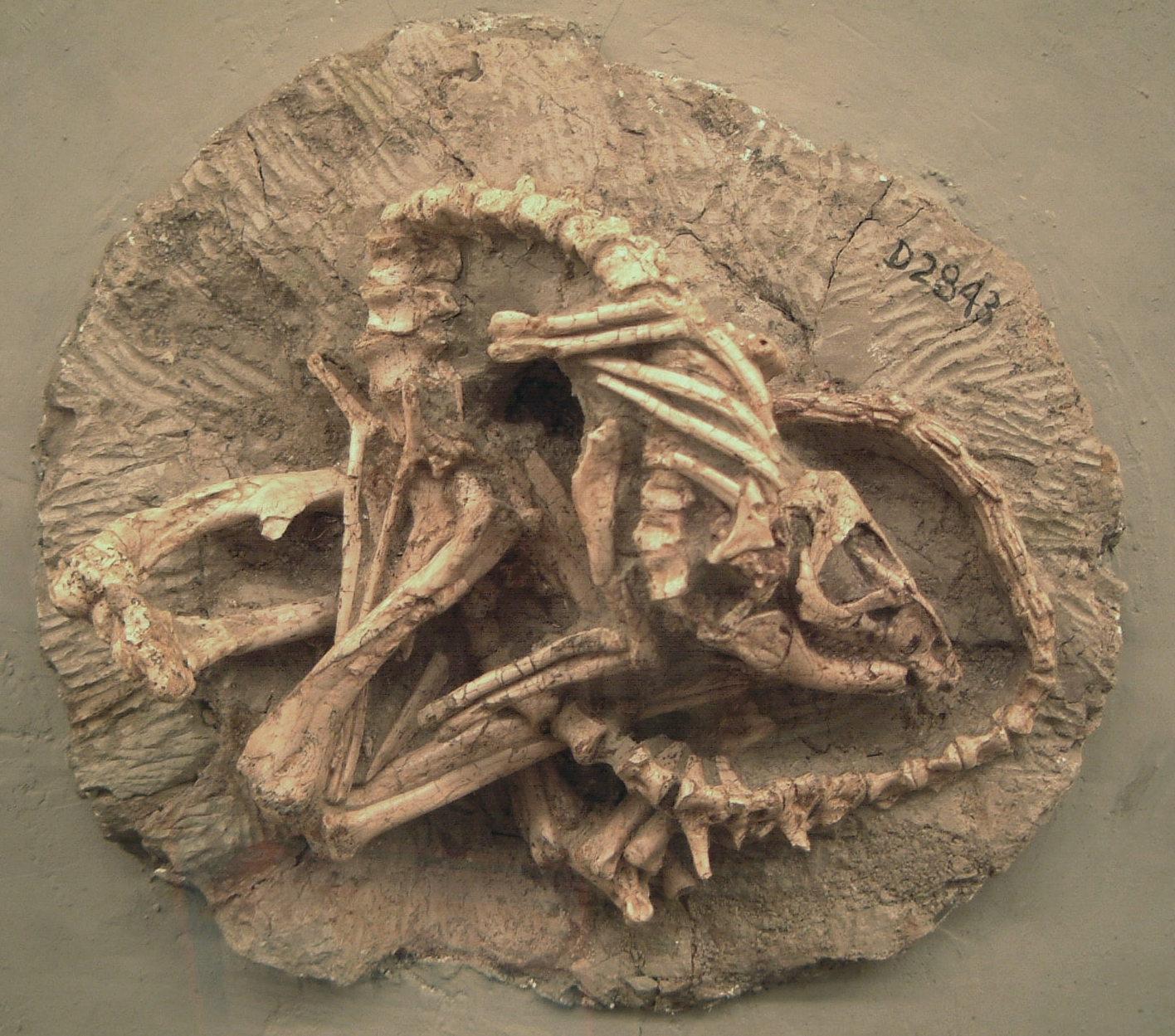
- Skeleton of Jeholosaurus

Scientific classification
- Kingdom: Animalia
- Phylum: Chordata
- Class: Reptilia
- Clade: Dinosauria
- Clade: †Ornithischia
- Clade: †Neornithischia
- Family: †Jeholosauridae; Han et al., 2012

Genera
- †Jeholosaurus; †Yueosaurus?; †Changchunsaurus?; †Haya?

= Jeholosauridae =

Jeholosauridae Temporal range: Early to Late Cretaceous, Aptian–Cenomanian

Extinct family of dinosaurs

Jeholosauridae is an extinct group of herbivorous neornithischian dinosaurs from the Cretaceous Period (Aptian - Cenomanian). The family was first proposed by Han et al. in 2012. The jeholosaurids were defined as all neornithischians more closely related to Jeholosaurus shangyuanensis than to Hypsilophodon foxii, Iguanodon bernissartensis, Protoceratops andrewsi, Pachycephalosaurus wyomingensis, or Thescelosaurus neglectus. The Jeholosauridae includes the type genus Jeholosaurus, and also possibly Yueosaurus, Changchunsaurus, and Haya.

The cladogram below results from analysis by Herne et al., 2019, which added Changchunsaurus and Haya to Jeholosauridae, but moved Yueosaurus to the sister family Thescelosauridae.

- Ornithischia
  - Heterodontosauridae
  - - Eocursor
    - - Thyreophora
      - Neornithischia
        - Lesothosaurus
        - - Agilisaurus
          - - - Hexinlusaurus
              - Yandusaurus
            - - - Nanosaurus
                - - Jeholosauridae
                    - Haya
                    - - Jeholosaurus
                      - Changchunsaurus
                  - Thescelosauridae
                    - - Orodromeus
                      - Koreanosaurus
                    - - Zephyrosaurus
                      - - Yueosaurus
                        - Thescelosaurus
              - Cerapoda
                - Marginocephalia
                - Ornithopoda
                  - Parksosaurus
                  - - Elasmaria
                      - Talenkauen
                      - - - Macrogryphosaurus
                          - Gasparinisaura
                        - - Galleonosaurus
                          - Leaellynasaura
                          - Anabisetia
                          - Diluvicursor
                    - Clypeodonta
                      - Hypsilophodon
                      - Iguanodontia
                        - Rhabdodontidae
                        - - Muttaburrasaurus
                          - - Tenontosaurus
                            - Dryomorpha
