= Wonthaggi Formation =

Geological formation in Victoria, Australia

- Stratigraphic range: Valanginian–Barremian
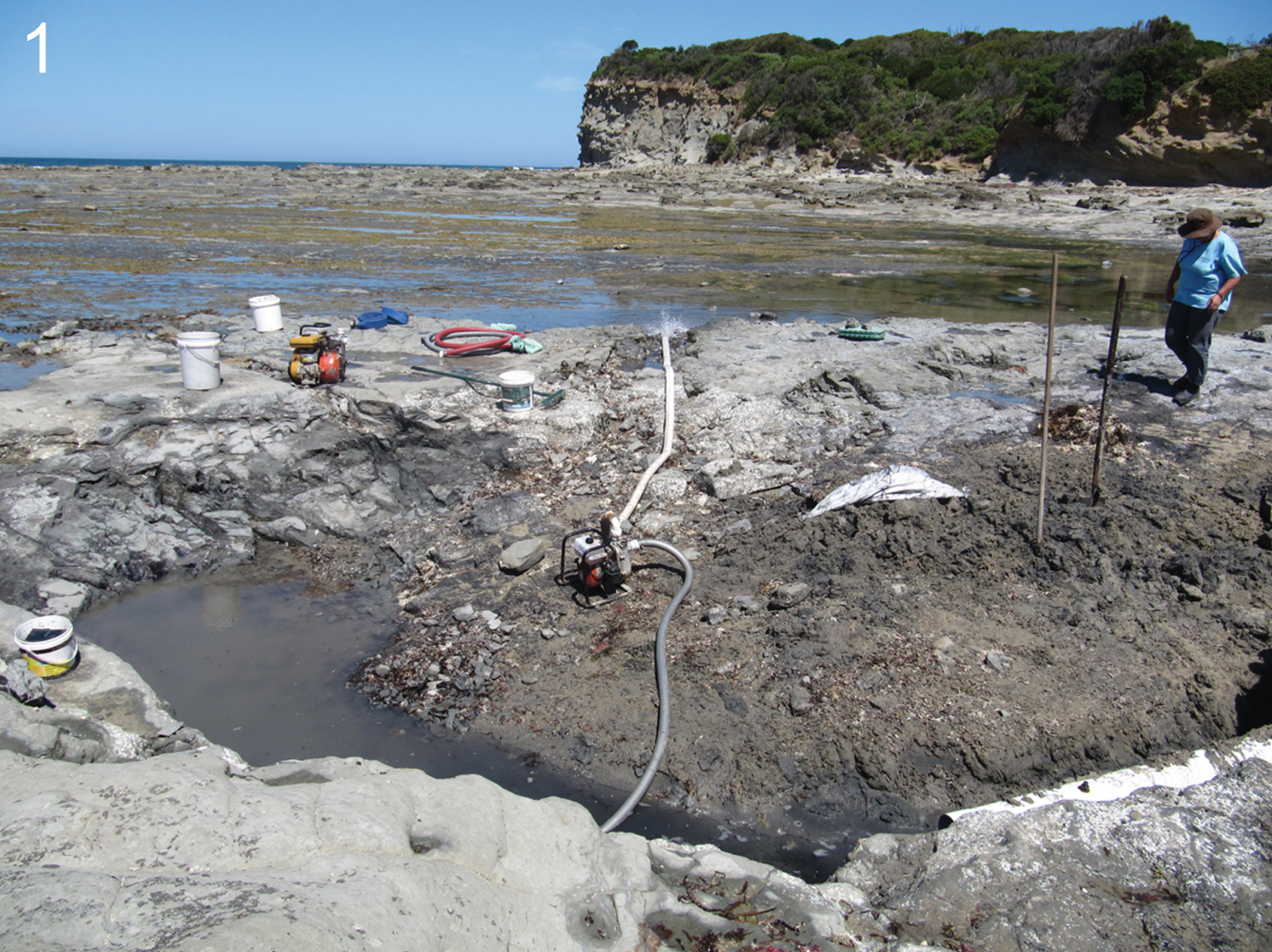
- Flat rocks locality
- Type: Geological formation
- Unit of: Strzelecki Group
- Underlies: Unconformity with Wombat Volcanics & Kersop Arkose
- Overlies: Paleozoic basement
- Thickness: Up to 2,500 m (8,200 ft)

Lithology
- Primary: Volcaniclastic sandstone, siltstone
- Other: Conglomerate, coal

Location
- Coordinates: 38.7°S 145.7°E
- Approximate paleocoordinates: 77.0°S 117.5°E
- Region: Victoria
- Country: Australia
- Extent: Gippsland Basin
- Wonthaggi Formation (Australia) Wonthaggi Formation (Victoria)

The Wonthaggi Formation is an informal geological formation in Victoria, Australia whose strata date back to the Early Cretaceous. It is part of the Strzelecki Group within the Gippsland Basin. Dinosaur remains are among the fossils that have been recovered from the formation. It is one of the three major fossiliferous stratigraphic units of the Victorian Lower Cretaceous alongside the Eumeralla Formation and Koonwarra Fossil Bed.

== Geology ==
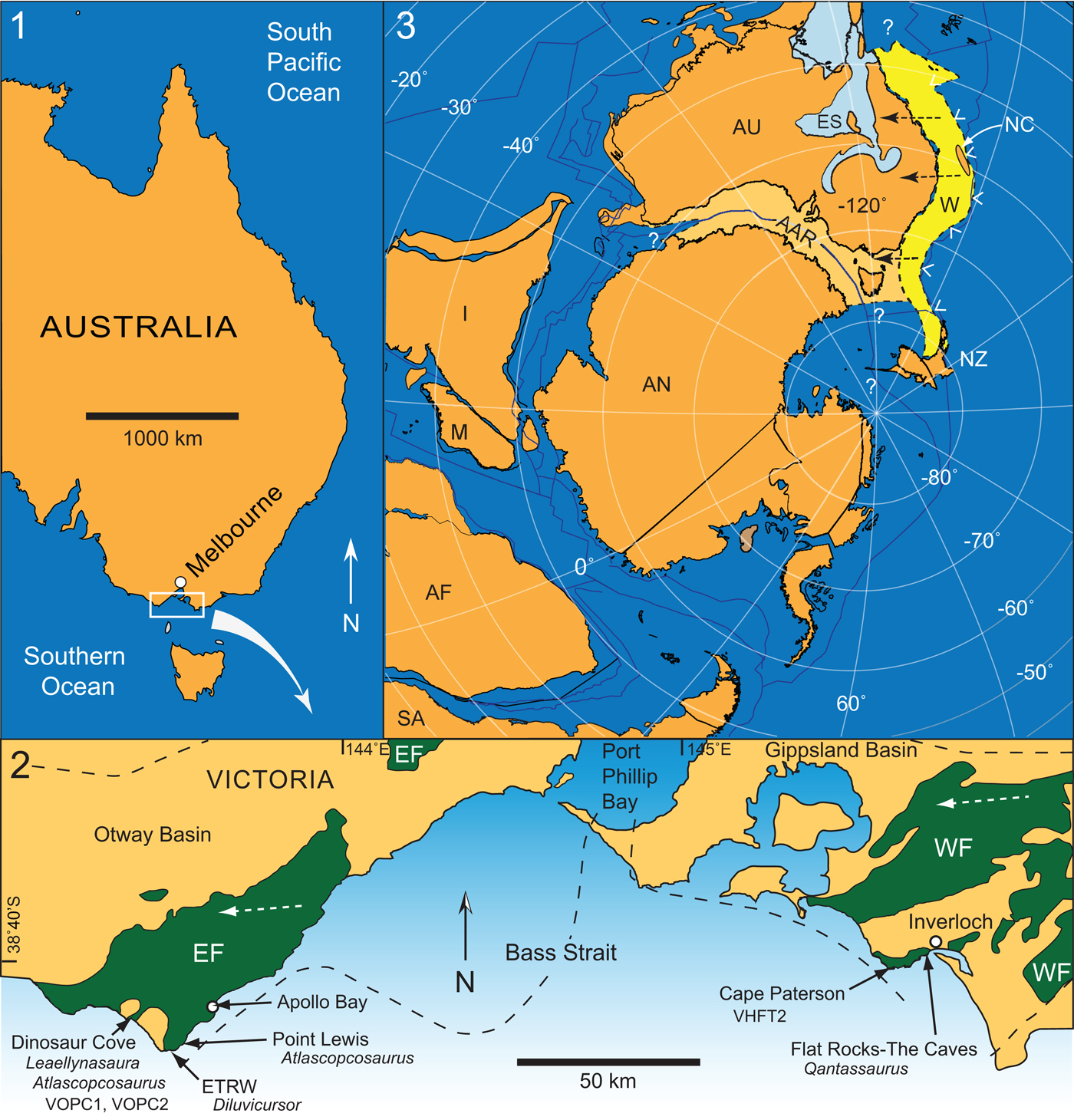
Exposure of Wonthaggi Formation green in bottom-right

The Wonthaggi Formation was deposited within Gippsland Basin, which formed part of a extensional rift valley system between Australia and Antarctica. The lithology primarily consists of fluvially deposited siliciclastics derived from volcanic rocks of the Whitsunday Silicic Large Igneous Province to the East, with suggestions that the sediments either originated from braided river and sheet flood deposits, or meandering river systems on vegetated floodplains. The age of the formation is thought to be Valanginian to Barremian, with the Flat Rocks site being late Barremian (~125 Ma) in age, older than the sediments from also fossiliferous Eumeralla Formation and Koonwarra Fossil Bed, which are thought to be Aptian-Albian in age.

=== Permafrost ===
Paleosol facies in the Wonthaggi have recorded periglacial cryoturbation structures. Unusual soft sediment deformation has been observed at the Flat Rocks and Kilcunda localities, representing cryogenic hummocks. At Kilcunda, clastic dykes representing thermal contraction cracks have been identified. In the coal seams of the Wonthaggi, stone rolls are interpreted as products of a distinct form of periglacial deformation in aapa mires. Periods of warmer, temperate climate conditions are recorded as Ultisols in the Valanginian interval of the sedimentary unit.

== Fossil content ==
Indeterminate ornithopod remains are present in Victoria, Australia. Indeterminate megaraptorid remains are present in Victoria, Australia.

Color key: Taxon / Reclassified taxon / Taxon falsely reported as present / Dubious taxon or junior synonym / Ichnotaxon / Ootaxon / Morphotaxon

Notes
Uncertain or tentative taxa are in small text
~~crossed out~~ taxa are discredited.

=== Dinosaurs ===
==== Ornithischians ====
Ornithischians of the Wonthaggi Formation
Genus	Species	Location	Stratigraphic position	Material	Notes	Image
Ankylosauria indet.	Indeterminate	Flat Rocks		Teeth, dorsal vertebra, ribs, osteoderms		
cf. Atlascopcosaurus	cf. A. loadsi	Flat Rocks		known as "Victorian ornithopod maxillary morphotype 4", consists of a partial right maxilla	A elasmarian ornithopod	Atlascopcosaurus
Galleonosaurus	G. dorisae	Flat Rocks		Known from a maxilla	A elasmarian ornithopod	
Qantassaurus	Q. intrepidus	Flat Rocks		"[Three] dentaries and teeth."	A elasmarian ornithopod	Qantassaurus
Qantassaurus	Q. ?intrepidus	Flat Rocks		"[Three] dentaries and teeth."	A elasmarian ornithopod	Qantassaurus
Serendipaceratops	S. arthurclarkei	The Arch, Kilcunda		Single damaged ulna	A dubious ornithischian	
Ornithopoda indet.	Indeterminate	Flat Rocks		Dentaries referred to as "Victorian ornithopodan dentary morphotype 3" including P228408, NMV P231182, NMV P199135 and isolated teeth	Different from Q. intrepidus.	
Ornithopoda indet.	Indeterminate	Cape Paterson		Single femur	An indeterminate ornithopod	

==== Theropods ====
Theropods of the Wonthaggi Formation
Genus	Species	Location	Stratigraphic position	Material	Notes	Image
Aves Indet.	Indeterminate	Possibly also present at the Eumeralla Formation (footprints).		Single furcula.		
Megaraptora indet.	Indeterminate	Flat Rocks		Numerous isolated teeth, and a left astragalus	Originally referred to "Allosaurus" robustus	
Megaraptoridae indet.	Indeterminate	Shack Bay		a complete frontal, attached to a partial parietal		
Noasauridae Indet.	Indeterminate	San Remo Member		NMV P221202, astragalocalcaneum	A non-elaphrosaurine noasaurid	

=== Amphibians ===
Amphibians of the Wonthaggi Formation
Genus	Species	Location	Stratigraphic position	Material	Notes	Image
Koolasuchus	K. cleelandi	Tree Trunk Point, Dwyers Hill, San Remo			A chigutisaurid temnospondyl	

=== Mammals ===
Mammals of the Wonthaggi Formation
Genus	Species	Location	Stratigraphic position	Material	Notes	Image
Ausktribosphenos	A. nyktos	Flat Rocks		Partial dentary with teeth	ausktribosphenid australosphenidan	
Bishops	B. whitmorei	Flat Rocks		Partial dentary with teeth	A ausktribosphenid australosphenidan	
Corriebaatar	C. marywaltersae	Flat Rocks		"NMV P216655, a fragment of a left dentary bearing a complete plagiaulacoid p4 and the anterior root of m1"	A corriebaatarid multituberculate	
Kryoparvus	K. gerriti	Flat Rocks		Partial dentary with teeth	A ausktribosphenid australosphenidan	
Teinolophos	T. trusleri	Flat Rocks		Partial dentary with teeth	A teinolophid monotreme	

== See also ==
- List of dinosaur-bearing rock formations
- South Polar region of the Cretaceous
