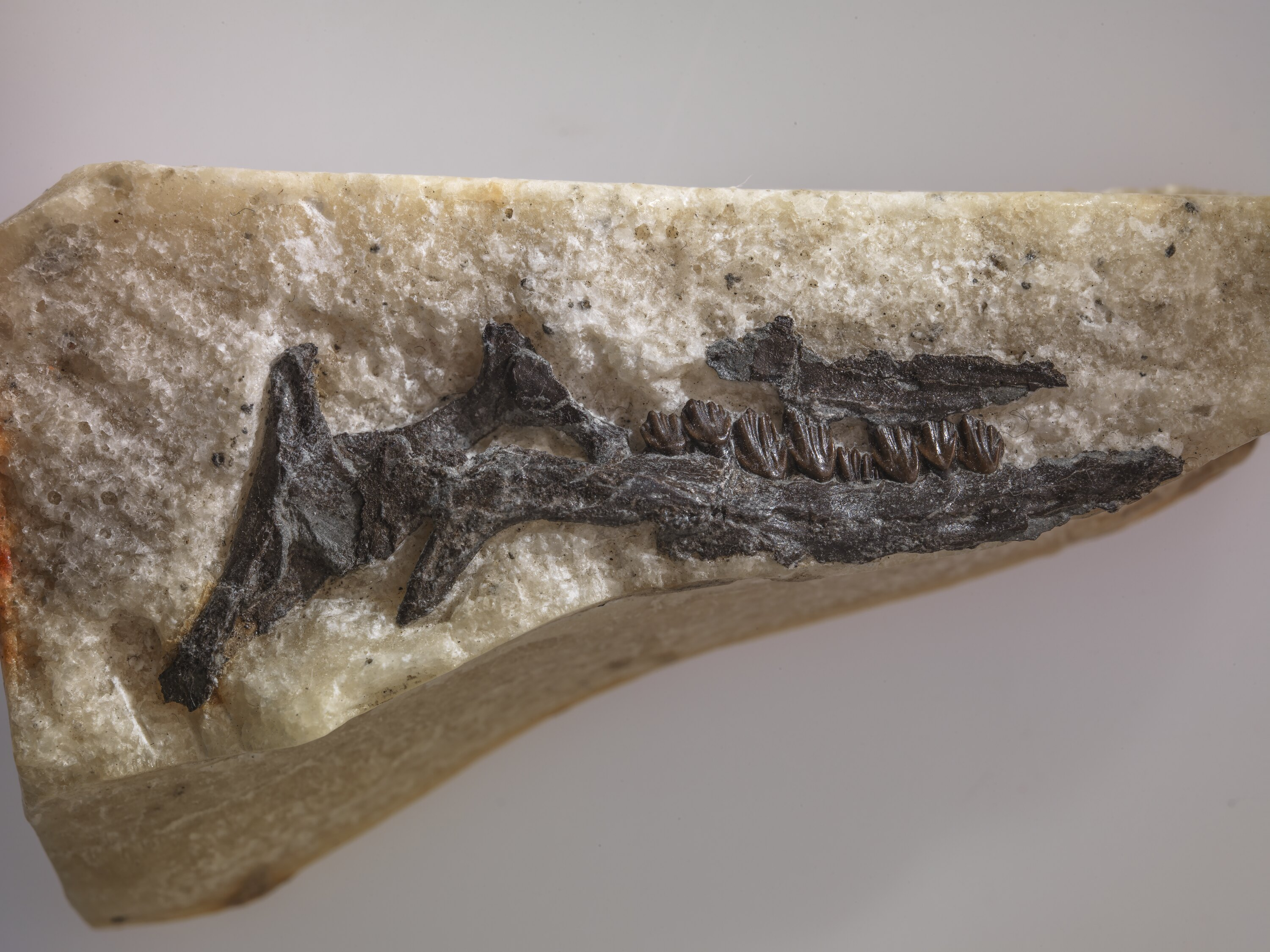
- Holotype maxilla

Scientific classification
- Kingdom: Animalia
- Phylum: Chordata
- Class: Reptilia
- Clade: Dinosauria
- Clade: †Ornithischia
- Clade: †Ornithopoda
- Clade: †Elasmaria
- Genus: †Leaellynasaura; Rich & Rich, 1989
- Species: †L. amicagraphica

Binomial name
- †Leaellynasaura amicagraphica Rich & Rich, 1989

= Leaellynasaura =

Leaellynasaura Temporal range: Aptian-Albian 118–110 Ma

Extinct genus of dinosaurs

Leaellynasaura (meaning "Leaellyn's lizard") is a genus of small herbivorous ornithischian dinosaurs from the late Aptian to early Albian stage of the Early Cretaceous, around 118-110 million years ago. It was first discovered in Dinosaur Cove, Australia. The only known species is Leaellynasaura amicagraphica. It was described in 1989, and named after Leaellyn Rich, the daughter of the Australian palaeontologist couple Tom Rich and Patricia Vickers-Rich who discovered it. The specific name, amicagraphica, translates to "friend writing" and honours both the Friends of the Museum of Victoria and the National Geographic Society for their support of Australian paleontology.

== Description ==
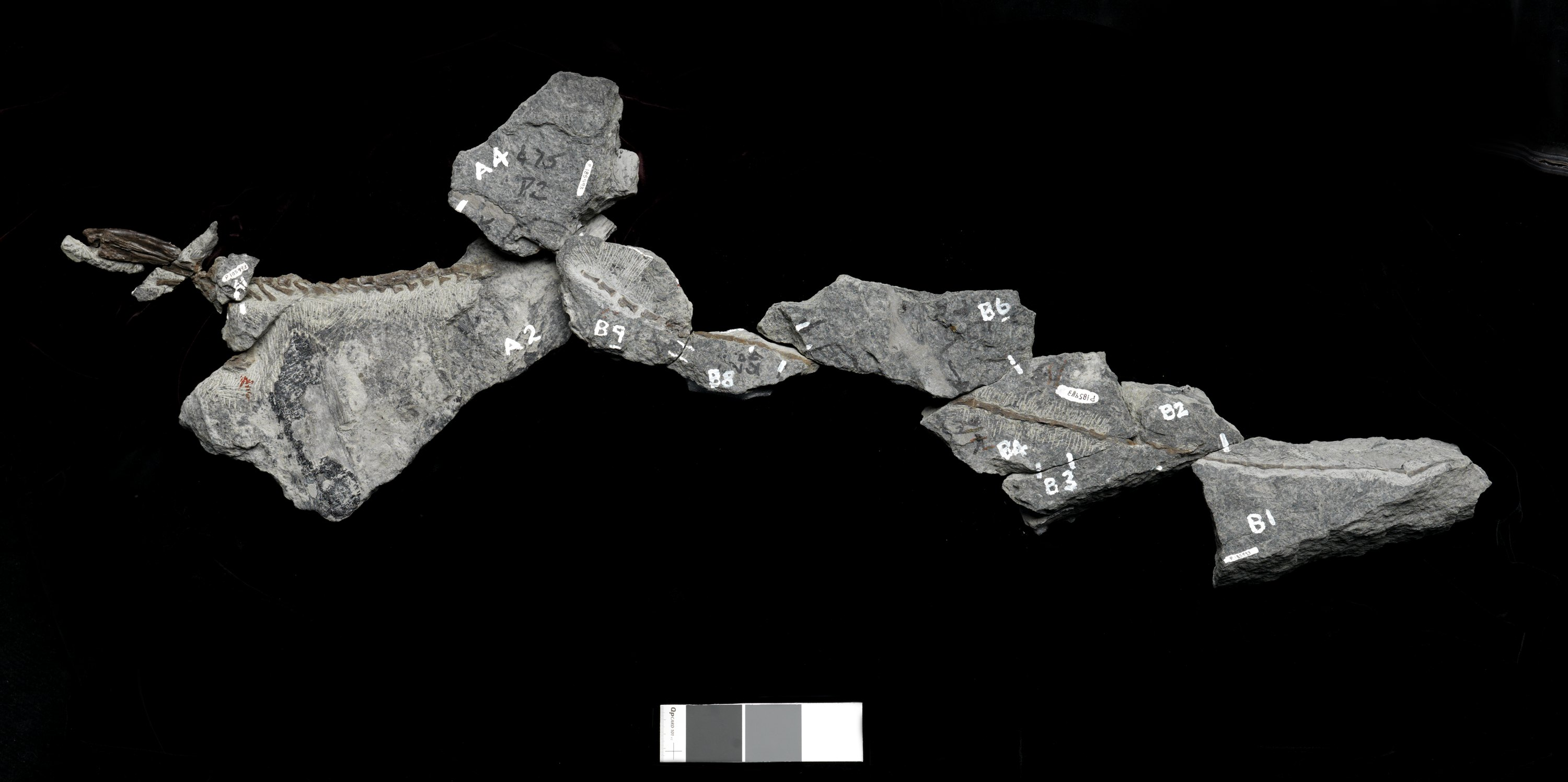
Partial long tailed ornithopod skeleton originally attributed to Leaellynasaura

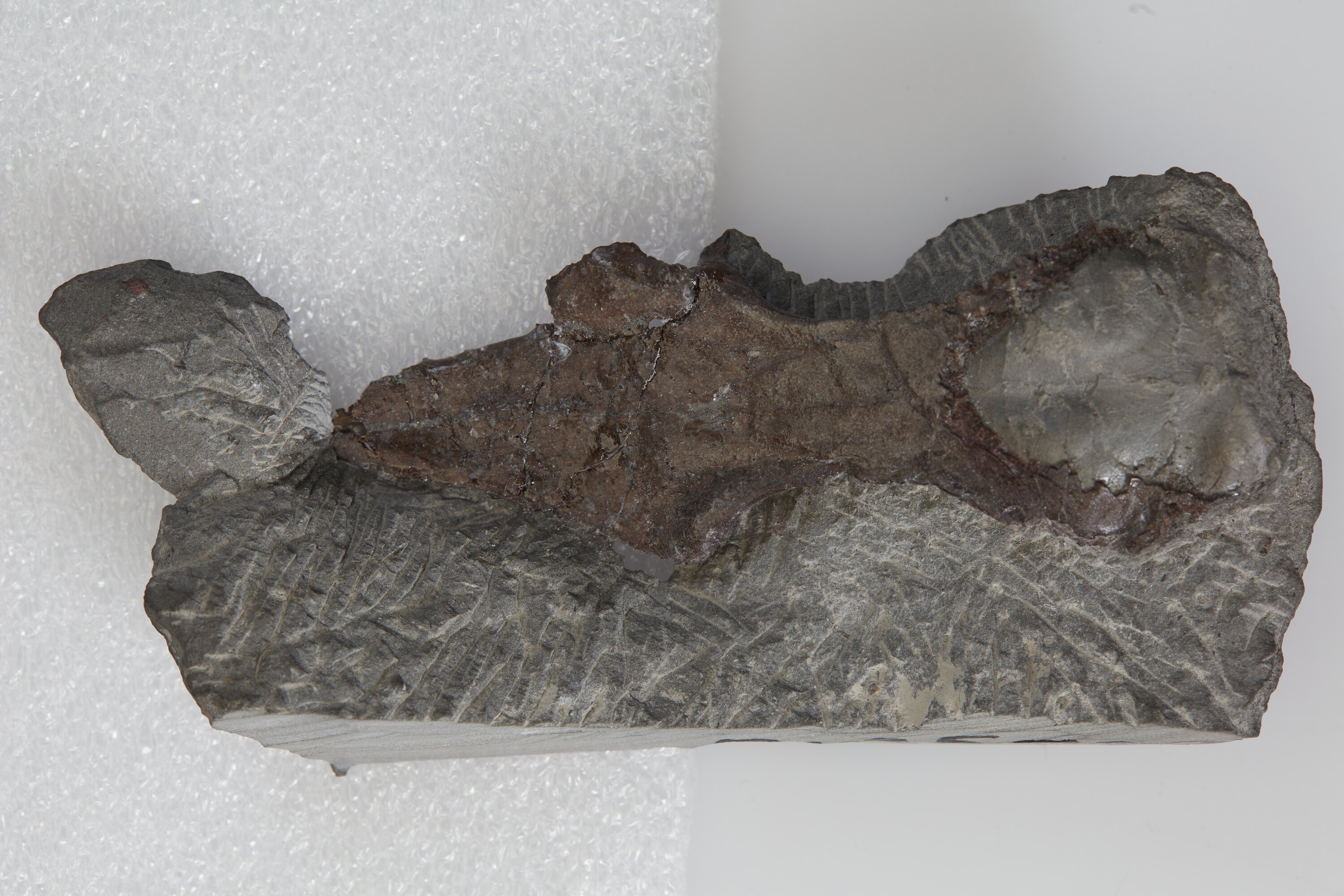
Skull attributed to Leaellynasaura

Leaellynasaura was a relatively small dinosaur. Recent estimates put its body length at roughly 180 cm including the tail. It is known from several specimens including two nearly complete skeletons and two fragmentary skulls. Herne (2009) argued that, unlike more advanced ornithischians, Leaellynasaura lacked ossified tendons in its tail. He also argued that the tail is noteworthy as among the longest relative to its body size of any ornithischian: the tail was three times as long as the rest of the body combined; it also has more tail vertebrae than any other ornithischians except for some hadrosaurs. However, in a subsequent revision of fossil material attributed to Leaellynasaura Herne (2013) could not confidently assign the postcranial skeletons with long tails (or indeed any fossils other than the holotype incomplete cranium MV P185991, right maxilla MV P186352 and left maxillary tooth MV P186412, all from late Aptian-early Albian Eumeralla Formation) to Leaellynasaura amicagraphica.

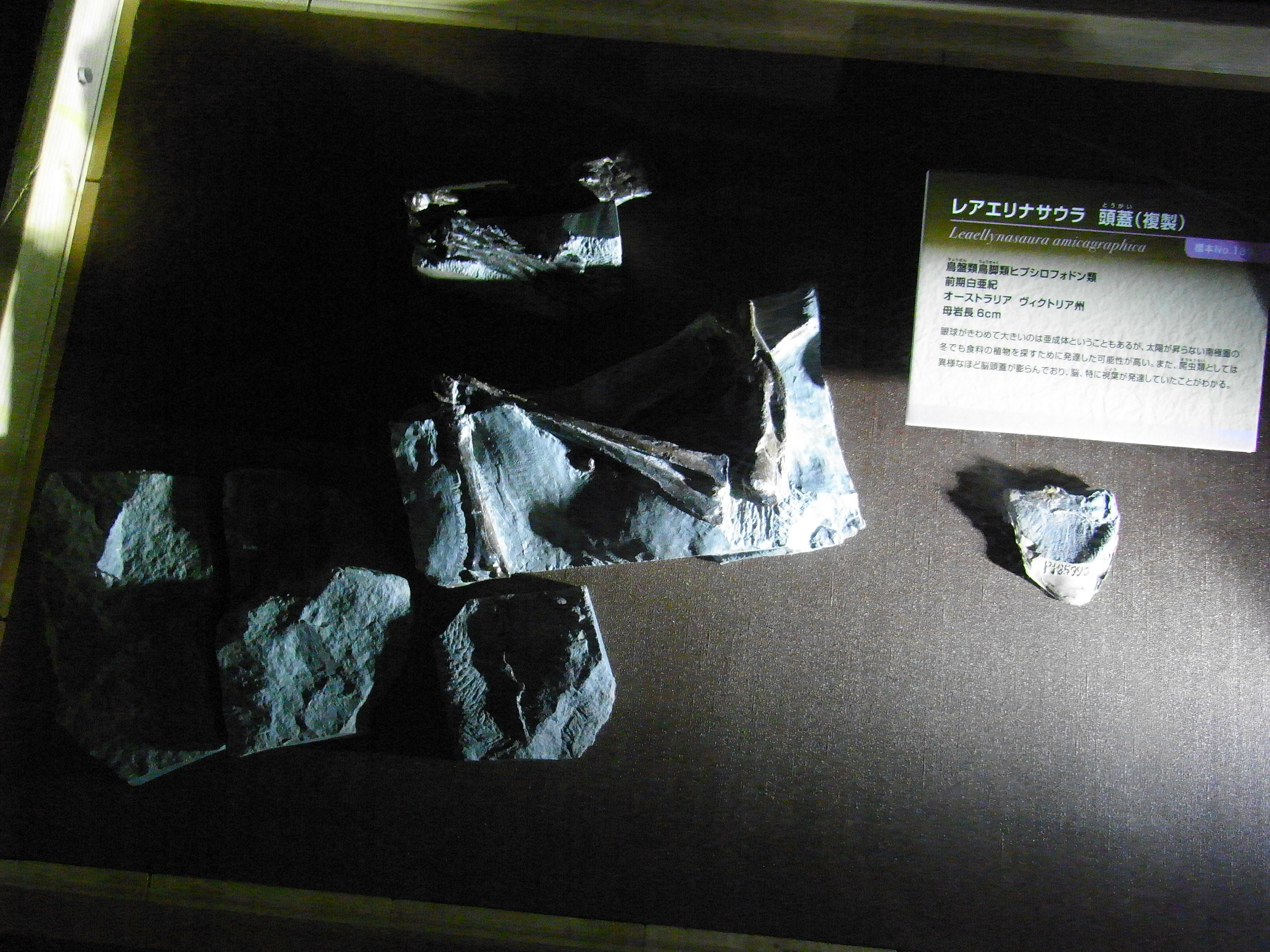
Fossils

== Classification ==
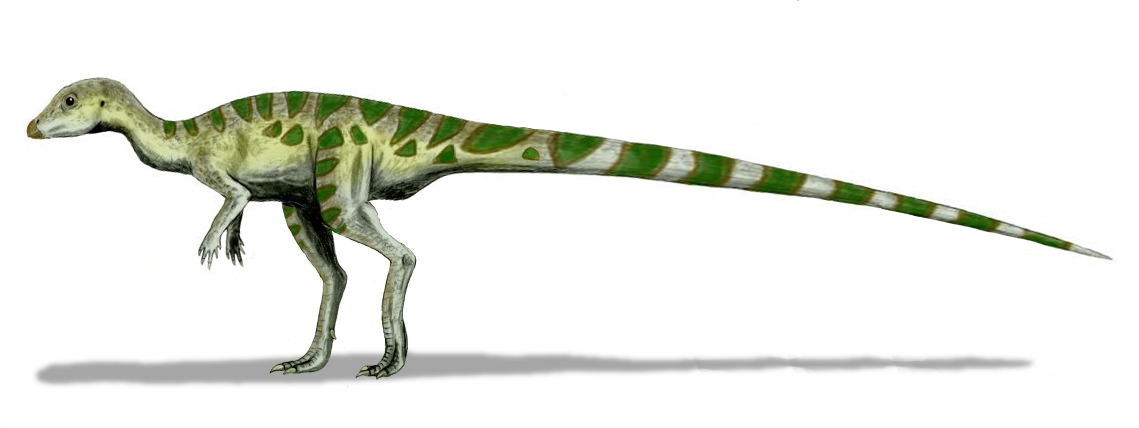
Reconstruction depicting Leaellynasaura with hypothetical scaly skin

Leaellynasaura has been variously described as a hypsilophodontid, a primitive iguanodontian or a primitive ornithischian (Genasauria). Recent studies have not found a consensus; some analyses describe it as a non-iguanodontian ornithopod, whereas others describe it as a basal neornithischian. A 2019 study recovered it as a member of Elasmaria.

Position according to Herne et al., 2019:

- Ornithischia
  - Heterodontosauridae
  - - Eocursor
    - - Thyreophora
      - Neornithischia
        - Lesothosaurus
        - - Agilisaurus
          - - - Hexinlusaurus
              - Yandusaurus
            - - - Nanosaurus
                - - Jeholosauridae
                  - Thescelosauridae
              - Cerapoda
                - Marginocephalia
                - Ornithopoda
                  - Parksosaurus
                  - - Elasmaria
                      - Talenkauen
                      - - - Macrogryphosaurus
                          - Gasparinisaura
                        - - Galleonosaurus
                          - Leaellynasaura
                          - Anabisetia
                          - Diluvicursor
                    - Clypeodonta
                      - Hypsilophodon
                      - Iguanodontia

== Biology and ecology ==
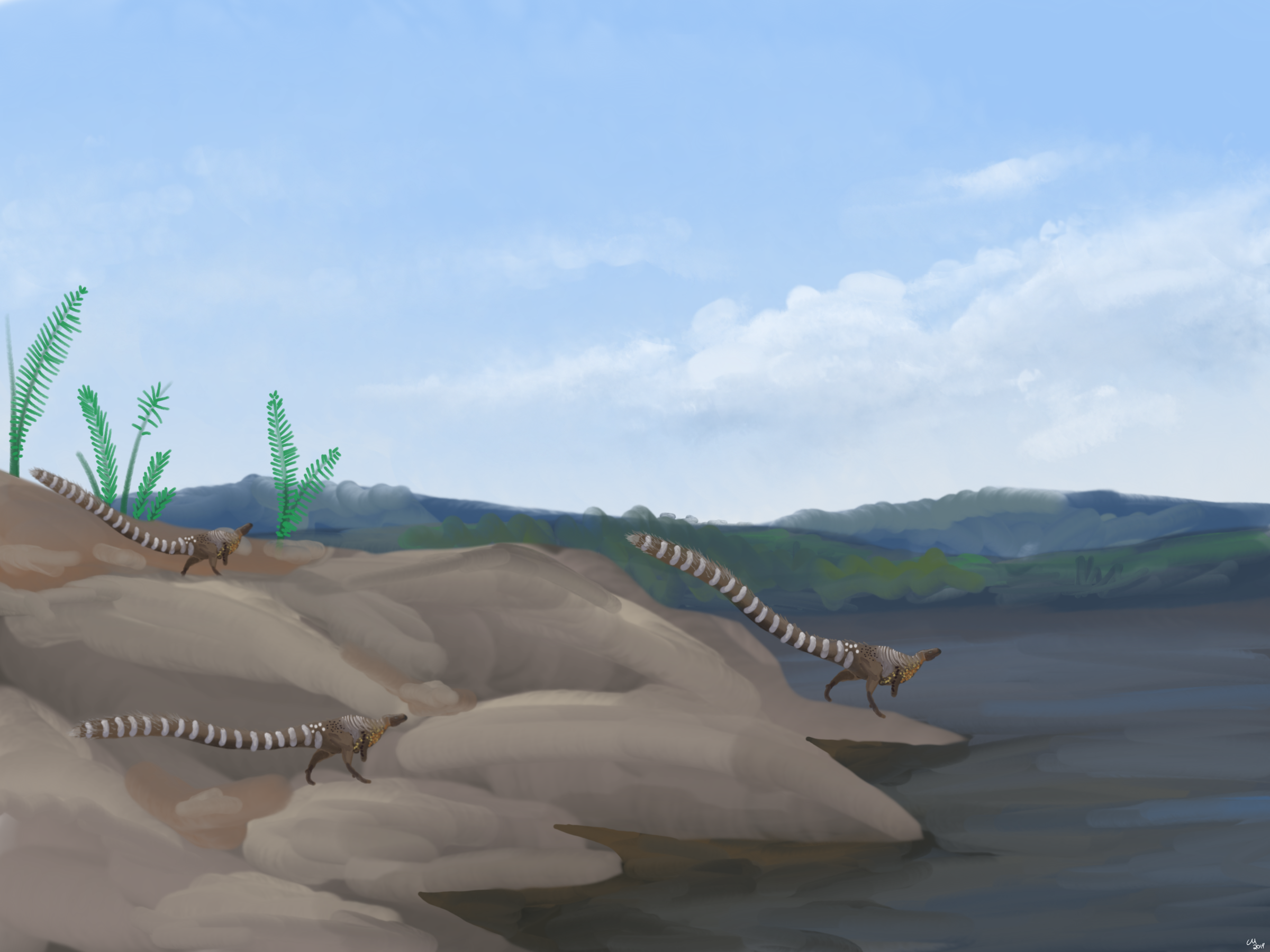
Restoration of three Leaellynasaura with hypothetical protofeathers

Leaellynasaura was an Australian polar dinosaur. At this period in time, Victoria would have been within the Antarctic Circle. Although this latitude is very cold today, it was significantly warmer during the mid-Cretaceous. Because of the Earth's tilt, Leaellynasaura and its contemporaries would still have been living under conditions with extended periods of both daylight and night. Depending on latitude, it is possible that the sun might not have risen for several weeks or months in the winter, which means that Leaellynasaura would have had to live in the dark for perhaps months at a time. A skull fragment interpreted as being from Leaellynasaura has been reported as showing enlarged eyes and the suggestion of proportionally large optic lobes, implying an adaptation to low-light conditions. However, the relatively large orbits of this specimen were more recently interpreted as representing characteristically large eyes of a juvenile individual, rather than any low-light adaptation. Its diet consisted of plants that grew low to the ground, like horsetails, cycads, and ferns.
