= Eumeralla Formation =

Geological formation in Victoria, Australia

- Stratigraphic range: Aptian–Albian
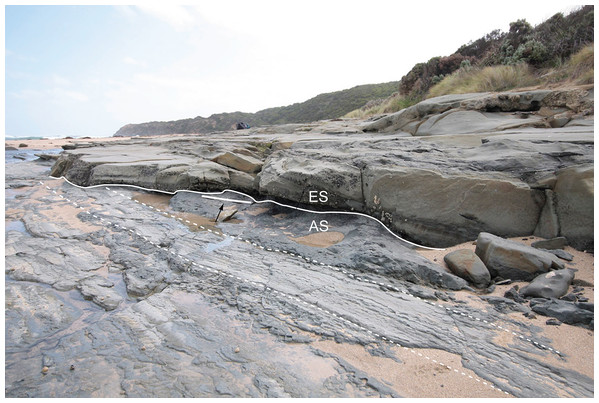
- Eric the Red West fossil locality, with AS and ES representing Anchor Sandstone and ETRW Sandstone, respectively
- Type: Geological formation
- Unit of: Otway Group
- Sub-units: Windermere Sandstone Member, Heathfield Sandstone Member
- Underlies: Sherbrook Group
- Overlies: Katnook Sandstone, Laira Formation (Crayfish Subgroup)
- Thickness: Up to 3,000 m (9,800 ft)

Lithology
- Primary: Volcanilithic sandstone, siltstone, mudstone, conglomerate

Location
- Coordinates: 38.8°S 143.3°E
- Approximate paleocoordinates: 74.8°S 115.8°E
- Region: Victoria
- Country: Australia
- Extent: Otway Basin

Type section
- Named for: Eumeralla River
- Named by: Reynolds, M.A
- Year defined: 1971
- Eumeralla Formation (Australia) Eumeralla Formation (Victoria)

The Eumeralla Formation is a geological formation in Victoria, Australia whose strata date back to the Early Cretaceous. It is Aptian to Albian in age. Dinosaur remains are among the fossils that have been recovered from the formation, particularly from the Dinosaur Cove locality. It is one of the three major fossiliferous stratigraphic units of the Victorian Lower Cretaceous alongside the Wonthaggi Formation and Koonwarra Fossil Bed.

== Geology ==
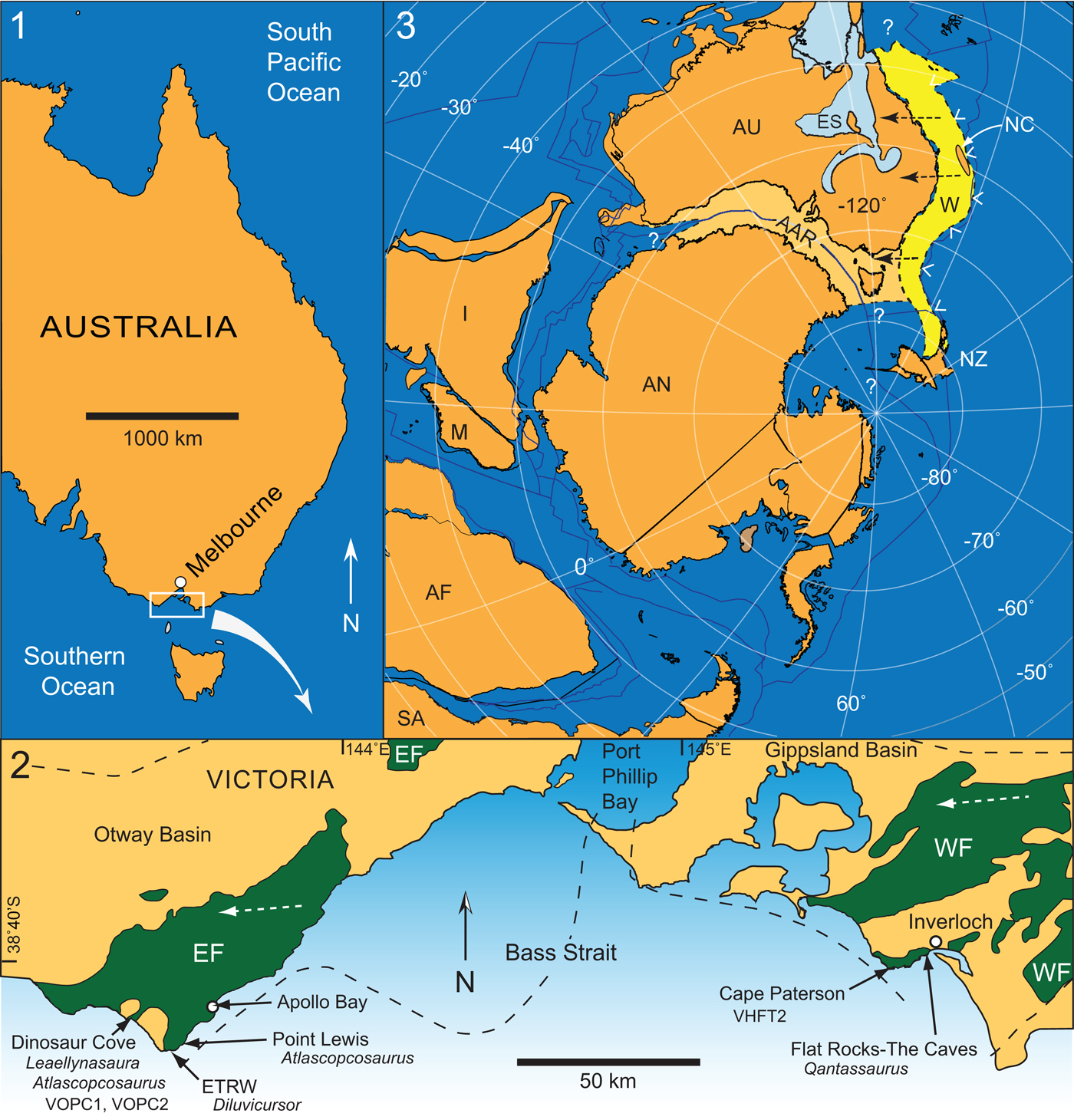
Exposure of the Eumeralla Formation in green at the bottom-left

The Eumeralla Formation was deposited within the Otway Basin, which at the time of deposition was part of an extensional rift valley system formed between Australia and Antarctica. The lithology primarily consists of fluvially deposited siliciclastics derived from volcanic material. The strata of the Eumeralla Formation are folded as a result of northwest–southeast crustal compression during the Neogene, which also reactivated some Cretaceous aged normal faults. It is one of three major fossiliferous deposits in Victoria dating to the Early Cretaceous, including the older Wonthaggi Formation and the Koonwarra Fossil Bed (which some authors have considered part of the Eumeralla Formation).

=== Paleoclimate ===
Paleosol facies in the Eumeralla Formation record climate fluctuations between warm and cool intervals. Warm, temperate periods are represented by Ultisols while cooler intervals at the Cape Paton locality record associated thin, gleyed Inceptisols and Entisols, which are characteristic of modern boreal forests.

== Fossil content ==
Invertebrate traces named as Skolithos sp. and Arenicolites sp., as well as indeterminate ornithischian tracks are present in Victoria, Australia. Indeterminate ornithopod remains are present at Eric the Red West locality and Elliot River, including material that possibly belongs to a new taxon. Indeterminate theropod and possible indeterminate dromaeosaurid remains are present in Victoria, Australia. An indeterminate unenlagiine is known from the formation.

Color key: Taxon / Reclassified taxon / Taxon falsely reported as present / Dubious taxon or junior synonym / Ichnotaxon / Ootaxon / Morphotaxon

Notes
Uncertain or tentative taxa are in small text
~~crossed out~~ taxa are discredited.

=== Dinosaurs ===
==== Ornithischians ====
Ornithischians of the Eumeralla Formation
Genus	Species	Location	Stratigraphic position	Material	Notes	Image
Ankylosauria Indet.	Indeterminate	Dinosaur Cove		Dorsal vertebra		
Atlascopcosaurus	A. loadsi	Dinosaur Cove, Eric the Red West locality		"Maxilla [and] teeth."	A elasmarian ornithopod	
Diluvicursor	D. pickeringi	Eric the Red West locality		Partial postcranial skeleton.	A elasmarian ornithopod	
cf.Galleonosaurus	G. dorisae	Eric the Red West locality		Maxillae	A elasmarian ornithopod	
Leaellynasaura	L. amicagraphica	Dinosaur Cove, Eric the Red West locality		Skull fragments, teeth, maxillae. Postcranial remains associated with the taxon cannot be confidently referred to it	A elasmarian ornithopod	

==== Theropods ====
Theropods of the Eumeralla Formation
Genus	Species	Location	Stratigraphic position	Material	Notes	Image
cf. Australovenator	cf. A. wintonensis	Eric the Red West locality		"two teeth, two manual unguals, and a right astragalus"	A megaraptorid theropod	
Avialae Indet.	Indeterminate			Footprints belonging to a crane-sized bird, determined to be an ornithurine or enantiornithe.	Possibly from a species also found at the Wonthaggi Formation (single furcula).	
Carcharodontosauria Indet.	Indeterminate			"Isolated, distal end of a right tibia"	First probable record of carcharodontosaurian theropod in Australia	
Elaphrosaurinae Indet.	Indeterminate	Eric the Red West locality		Single cervical vertebra		
Megaraptora Indet.	Indeterminate	Dinosaur Cove		Known from a left ulna.	Probably a megaraptorid. Previously referred to Megaraptor.	
Megaraptoridae Indet.	Indeterminate	Eric the Red West locality		Known from a single cervical vertebra.	Previously thought to be a Baryonyx-related spinosaurid.	
Timimus	T. hermani	Dinosaur Cove		Femur	A possible tyrannosauroid theropod	
Unenlagiinae Indet.	Indeterminate			Proximal portion of right femur	Probable record of unenlagiine dromaeosaurid in Australia	

=== Pterosaurs ===
Pterosaurs of the Eumeralla Formation
Genus	Species	Location	Stratigraphic position	Material	Notes	Image
Pterosauria Indet.	Indeterminate	Dinosaur Cove				

=== Crocodylomorphs ===
Crocodylomorphs of the Eumeralla Formation
Genus	Species	Location	Stratigraphic position	Material	Notes	Image
Mesoeucrocodylia Indet.	Indeterminate	Dinosaur Cove			Distinct from other known Australian crocodilians	

=== Plesiosaurs ===
Plesiosaurs of the Eumeralla Formation
Genus	Species	Location	Stratigraphic position	Material	Notes	Image
Plesiosauria Indet.	Indeterminate	Dinosaur Cove				

=== Turtles ===
Turtles of the Eumeralla Formation
Genus	Species	Location	Stratigraphic position	Material	Notes	Image
Otwayemys	O. cunicularius	Dinosaur Cove			A meiolaniform turtle	

=== Fish ===
Fishes of the Eumeralla Formation
Genus	Species	Location	Stratigraphic position	Material	Notes	Image
Ceratodus	C. nargun				A ceratodontid lungfish	Ceratodus

=== Mammals ===
Mammals of the Eumeralla Formation
Genus	Species	Location	Stratigraphic position	Material	Notes	Image
Kryoryctes	K. cadburyi	Dinosaur Cove			A kollikodontid monotreme	
Sundrius	S. ziegleri				A kollikodontid monotreme	

== See also ==
- List of dinosaur-bearing rock formations
- South Polar region of the Cretaceous
