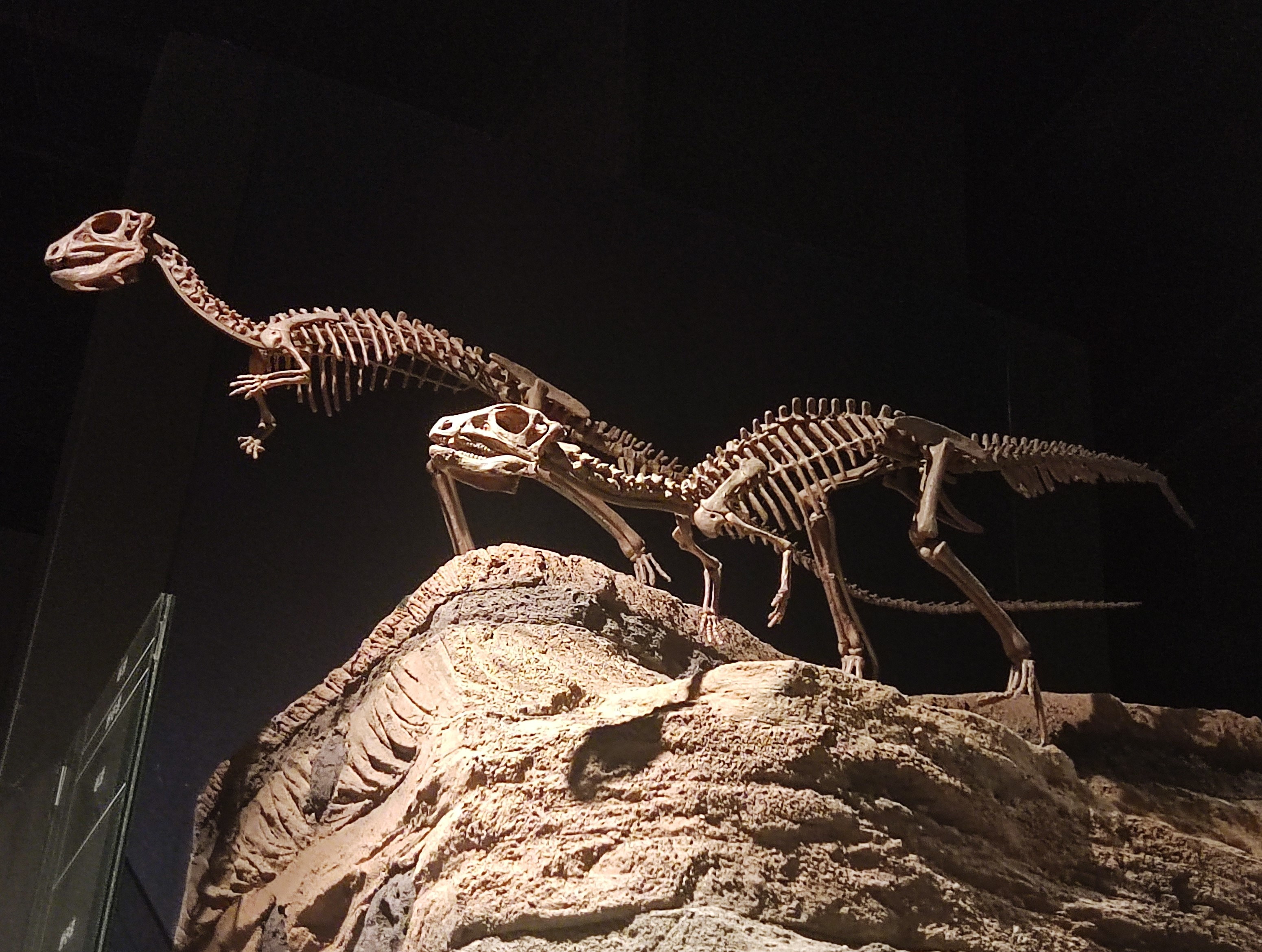
- Reconstructed skeletons in Zhejiang Geological Museum

Scientific classification
- Kingdom: Animalia
- Phylum: Chordata
- Class: Reptilia
- Clade: Dinosauria
- Clade: †Ornithischia
- Family: †Thescelosauridae
- Subfamily: †Thescelosaurinae
- Genus: †Yueosaurus; Zheng et al., 2012
- Species: †Y. tiantaiensis

Binomial name
- †Yueosaurus tiantaiensis Zheng et al., 2012

= Yueosaurus =

Yueosaurus Temporal range: Cretaceous, Albian–Cenomanian

Extinct genus of dinosaurs

Yueosaurus is an extinct genus of basal neornithischian dinosaur known from Zhejiang Province, China.

== Discovery ==
Yueosaurus was first named by Wenjie Zheng, Xingsheng Jin, Masateru Shibata, Yoichi Azuma and Fangming Yu in 2012 and the type species is Yueosaurus tiantaiensis. The generic name is derived from "Yue", the ancient name for Zhejiang, and the specific name refers to the Tiantai, where the holotype was discovered.

== Description ==
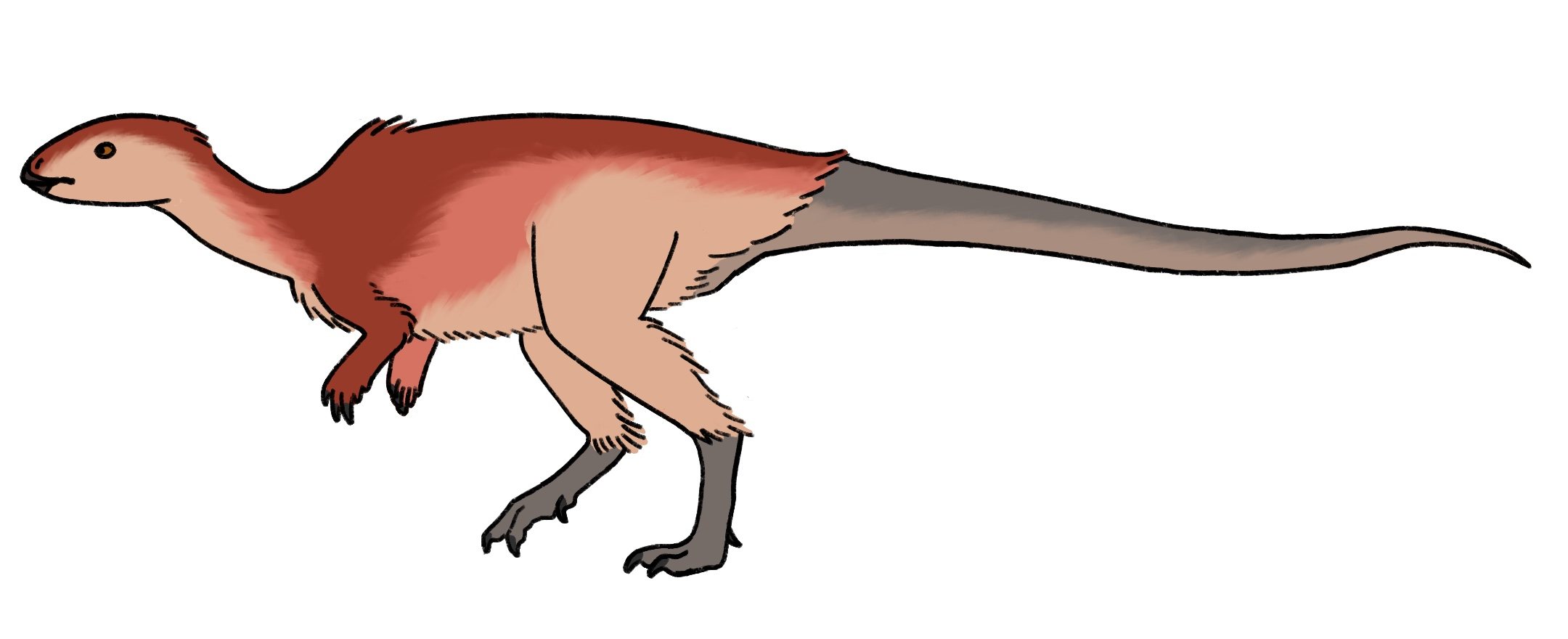
Life restoration

Yueosaurus is known only from the holotype ZMNH M8620, an articulated, partial but well preserved postcranial skeleton which includes cervical, dorsal (back) and caudal vertebrae, scapula, rib, hip bones, partial forelimb and partial hindlimb. It was collected in Tiantai locality from the Liangtoutang Formation, dating to the Albian-Cenomanian stages of the latest Early Cretaceous and the earliest Late Cretaceous. Yueosaurus represents the southernmost basal ornithopod dinosaur from Asia, and the first one from China. It differs from other ornithischians by a combination of characters. Han et al. found it plausible that Yueosaurus might be a member of Jeholosauridae or closely related to it.
