= Halibut Oil Field =

Oil field in Victoria, Australia

Halibut Field
- Location within Australia Location within Victoria
- Country: Australia
- Region: Southeastern Australia
- Location: Gippsland Basin
- Offshore/onshore: Offshore
- Coordinates: 38°23′56″S 148°18′59″E
- Operator: ExxonMobil Australia
- Partners: Exxon

Field history
- Discovery: 1967
- Start of development: 1967
- Start of production: 1970

The Halibut Field is an oil field, within the Gippsland Basin offshore of the Australian state of Victoria. The oil field is located approximately 64 km offshore of southeastern Australia. The total area of this field is 26.9 km^{2} and is composed of 10 mappable units.

== Geologic history ==
During the late Jurassic, a rift complex forms between the Australian Plate/Tasman Fold Belt, and the Antarctic Plate. This rifting continues through the early Cretaceous, and in the middle Cretaceous, begins to assist in the separation of Gondwana (In is what now southern Australia). During this same time, ocean crust is created to the west of Tasmania, and the separation of the Australian Plate from New Zealand, the Antarctic Plate, and the Campbell Plateau occurs. During the late Cretaceous, more extension occurs in this region, which creates syn-rift troughs. This extension forms the central depression, which is an integral part of the petroleum system, and is the location of nearly all of the oil/gas fields in the Gippsland Basin. Also during the late Cretaceous, volcanism occurred due to the Tasman Sea rifting. From the Eocene to the middle Miocene, a compressional tectonic period begins, and forms a series of anticlines, as well as nearly all of the structural features present today.

== Stratigraphy ==
=== Strzelecki Group ===
The Strzelecki Group is a geologic group present in the Halibut Field area. The group was mainly deposited in the early Cretaceous. It is mainly composed of continental and lacustrine clastics. The lithology is predominantly nonmarine greywackes, and mudstones, with minor layers of sandstone, conglomerate, coals, and volcanoclastics. Depositional environments of this group include lakes, swamps, and floodplains. This group is the economic basement of the Halibut Field, meaning it is the stratigraphically lowest group for hydrocarbon production potential. This is known due to burial of 8 km or more in the offshore portion of the basin, which places the group in the overmature range. There is currently research being done on potential hydrocarbon reserves in the onshore portion of the Gippsland Basin.

=== Golden Beach Group ===
The Golden Beach Group lies unconformably above the Strzelecki Group, and was deposited in the late Cretaceous. The lithology of this group is shale, and sandstone. In addition to these major lithologic groups, there are also volcanic flows of andesitic-basaltic composition present. The depositional environments represented by this group are deep water lakes, and floodplains. The Kipper Shale Formation within this group is a 1,0000 m thick lacustrine shale. Though this would typically make a good source rock, it is believed that oxidation of organic matter inhibited the generation of hydrocarbons.

=== Latrobe Group ===
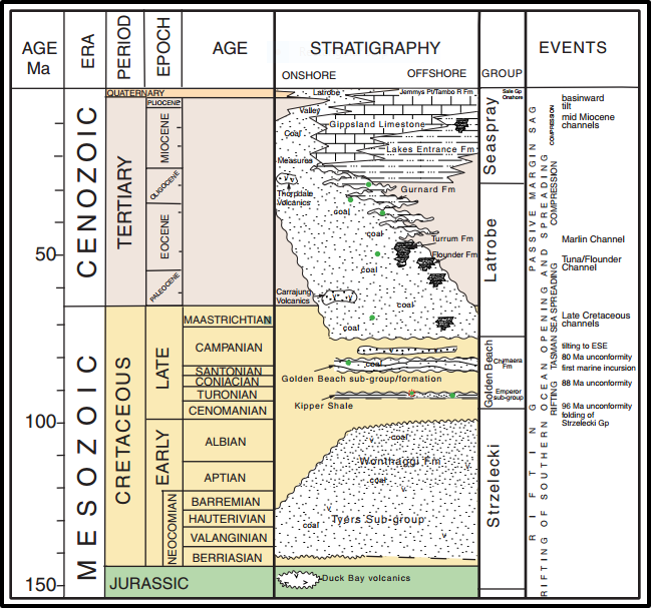
Stratigraphic Column of the Halibut Field, Australia

The Latrobe Group is stratigraphically above the Golden Beach Group, and was deposited in the late Cretaceous to the Eocene. This group is the most valuable for hydrocarbon production, since it makes up the majority of the source rocks, and the reservoir rocks. The major rock types include sandstone, siltstone, mudstone, shale, coals, and volcanic rocks. These rock types are representative of alluvial, shoreline, and shallow shelf marine depositional environments. The coals and shales of this group are the main source rock in this field, and throughout the basin. Sandstone from this group makes up the reservoir rocks, and exhibits a porosity of 20-25%, and a permeability of 5000-7000 millidarcies. This group has been subjected to much research due to its hydrocarbon implications. This has allowed researchers to reconstruct paleoshorelines, and paleoflow directions. Multiple transgressions and regressions are recorded in the rocks from the upper Paleocene to the Eocene. Throughout the area, the surrounding sandstones display a high amount of dolomite cement present, which drastically decreases porosity (it can make up to 30% of the total rock volume). Dissolution of this cement in hydrocarbon bearing sandstones, has not been completely understood by researchers. The small amount of research done on this phenomenon has pointed to hydrocarbon emplacement as the reason for dissolution. This is only due to the lack of evidence for other common causes of dolomite dissolution.

=== Seaspray Group ===
The Seaspray Group lies unconformably above the Latrobe Group, and was deposited in the Oligocene to the Miocene. This group makes up the majority of the seals in the region due to the unconformity with the Latrobe Group, as well as the low permeability of the rock types, which include shales, marls, limestones, calcareous claystones, siltstones, and sandstones. The typical depositional environments of these rock types, are low energy marine environments.

== Petroleum geology ==
=== Source rocks ===
The majority of the source rocks are coals, and coaly shales originating from the Latrobe group. The hydrocarbon formation is due to the high heat flow, and subsidence that occurred in the late Cretaceous through the early Paleocene. The shales of the Latrobe Group display Total Organic Carbon (TOC) values of 1-3% wt.

=== Reservoir rocks ===
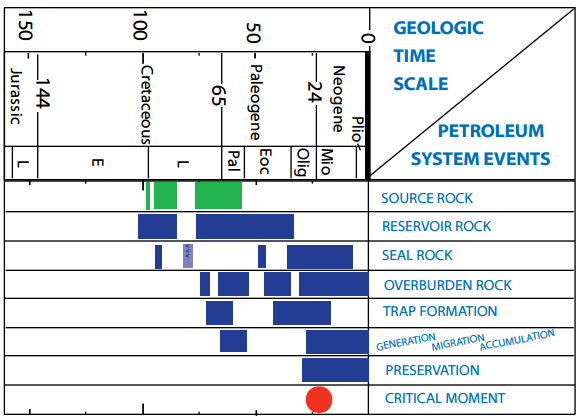
Critical Moment of the Halibut Field, Australia

The reservoir rocks in this field are primarily sandstones from the Latrobe Group. The secondary porosity accounts for the majority of the porosity, and therefore its ability to contain hydrocarbons. The reason for this is due to the high amount of dolomite cement which filled up the pores, and then was dissolved by the hydrocarbons migrating into the pores. The porosity of the sandstones are 20-25%, and the permeability is 5000-7000 md.

=== Seals ===
The seals in this region are mainly marl, limestone, and sandstone from the Seaspray Group. These rock types are aided by being deposited on the Latrobe unconformity. This unconformity is due to the anticlines that formed in the Latrobe group being eroded, and then the Seaspray group being deposited on top of this erosional surface.

=== Traps ===
The traps in this oil field, are mainly late Eocene to middle Miocene in age. The traps were formed due to a small compressional event associated with the opening of the Tasman Sea. This is why anticlines, along with faults are the predominant trapping mechanism throughout the basin. The Halibut Field is located directly on an anticline, which serves as the trap.

=== Migration ===
Migration of the hydrocarbons is mainly vertical. Oil migration occurs from depths of 4–5 km, while gas migration occurs from depths of 5–6 km.

== Production ==
The field was discovered in 1967, and has been producing oil and gas since 1970. The water depth is 73 m, and there are 14 producing wells. The oil water contact is located at approximately 2399 m depth. The porosity is 22%, and the permeability is 5000-7000 millidarcy. The oil gravity is 43.3, and is paraffinic. From 1970-2008 approximately 840,000,000 barrels of oil or approximately $105,000,000,000 (calculated with a price of $125.00 per barrel) was produced. The field is being produced by ExxonMobil Australia, which is a subsidiary of ExxonMobil. The Gippsland Basin as a whole was Australia's largest petroleum producing basin from the mid 1960s when it was discovered until 1996 when the North West Shelf surpassed it. The basin was integral in Australia becoming a self sufficient petroleum producing country.
