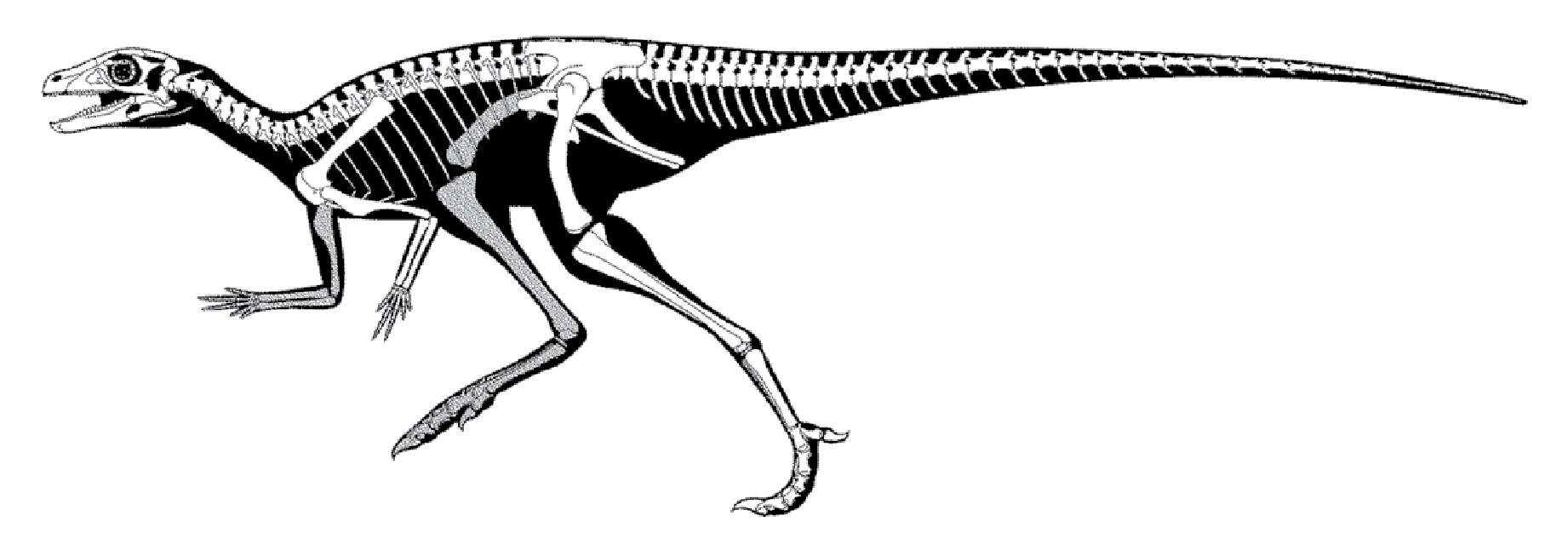
- Reconstructed skeleton

Scientific classification
- Kingdom: Animalia
- Phylum: Chordata
- Class: Reptilia
- Clade: Dinosauria
- Clade: †Ornithischia
- Genus: †Eocursor; Butler, Smith & Norman, 2007
- Species: †E. parvus

Binomial name
- †Eocursor parvus Butler, Smith & Norman, 2007

= Eocursor =

Eocursor Temporal range: Early Jurassic, 201.3–191 Ma

Extinct genus of dinosaur from early Jurassic South Africa

Eocursor (meaning "dawn runner") is genus of basal ornithischian dinosaur that lived in what is now South Africa during the Early Jurassic. Remains of this animal have been found in the Upper Elliot Formation and it is among the most completely known early ornithischians, shedding new light on the origin of the group.

The exact age of this taxon has been the subject of uncertainty. It was originally interprereted as living during the Late Triassic (Norian age), around 210 million years ago; however, Olsen, Kent & Whiteside (2010) stated that there is no independent geochronological support for its assumed age, and the available data makes it impossible to conclusively determine whether Eocursor is of Triassic or Early Jurassic (potentially as young as Sinemurian) age. Eocursor was subsequently interpreted as a taxon of Early Jurassic age by McPhee et al. (2017), who identified the specimen as having originated from the Upper (not Lower) Elliot Formation.

Fossils of Eocursor were originally collected in 1993, but were not formally described until fourteen years later. The type species, Eocursor parvus, was described in 2007 by Richard J. Butler, Roger M. H. Smith, and David B. Norman. Eocursor was one of the earliest known ornithischians, and sheds some light on early dinosaur relationships because early dinosaurs are known from mostly incomplete skeletons. Eocursor is known from partial skeletal elements, including skull fragments, spinal elements, pelvis, long leg bones, and unusually large grasping hands.

== Discovery and naming ==
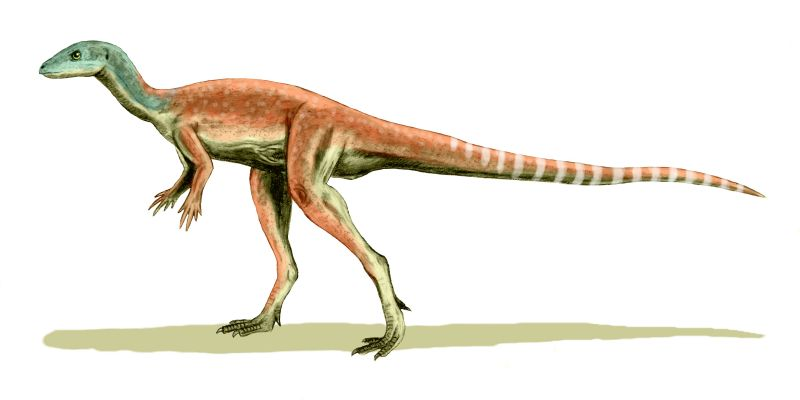
Speculative life restoration

In 1993, the holotype specimen of Eocursor (SAM-PK-K8025) was collected from the Upper Elliot Formation in Free State, South Africa. The skeleton, although only partially complete, is one of the best-preserved early ornithischian skeletons ever found. The fossils include a partial skeleton: portions of the skull, lower jaw, vertebrae, and limbs.

In June 2007, the fossils were formally described by an international team of paleontologists: Richard Butler of the Natural History Museum, London, and the University of Cambridge, David Norman of the University of Cambridge, and Roger M. H. Smith of the Iziko South African Museum. The fossils were named Eocursor parvus, from the Greek word eos (meaning "dawn"), and the Latin words cursor (meaning "runner") and parvus ("little"), "in reference to the early occurrence of this ornithischian, its apparent locomotory abilities and its small size."

== Description ==
Size comparison

Eocursor was a lightly built bipedal dinosaur with an estimated length of about 1 m (3 ft). The general aspect of the animal resembles that of the early Jurassic ornithischians such as Lesothosaurus and Scutellosaurus. Its large hands resembled those of the Heterodontosauridae, a clade of primitive ornithischians. The morphology of the triangular teeth, not unlike those of an iguana, suggests partial herbivory. The tibia was significantly longer than the femur, indicating it was a swift runner.

== Classification ==
Eocursor was an early ornithischian, one of the first so-called "bird-hipped" dinosaurs, a group which would eventually give rise to animals such as Stegosaurus, Triceratops, and Iguanodon. Butler et al. consider Eocursor more primitive than Lesothosaurus and Heterodontosauridae, but more derived than the Pisanosaurus, as a basal ornithischian forming a sister clade of Genasauria.
