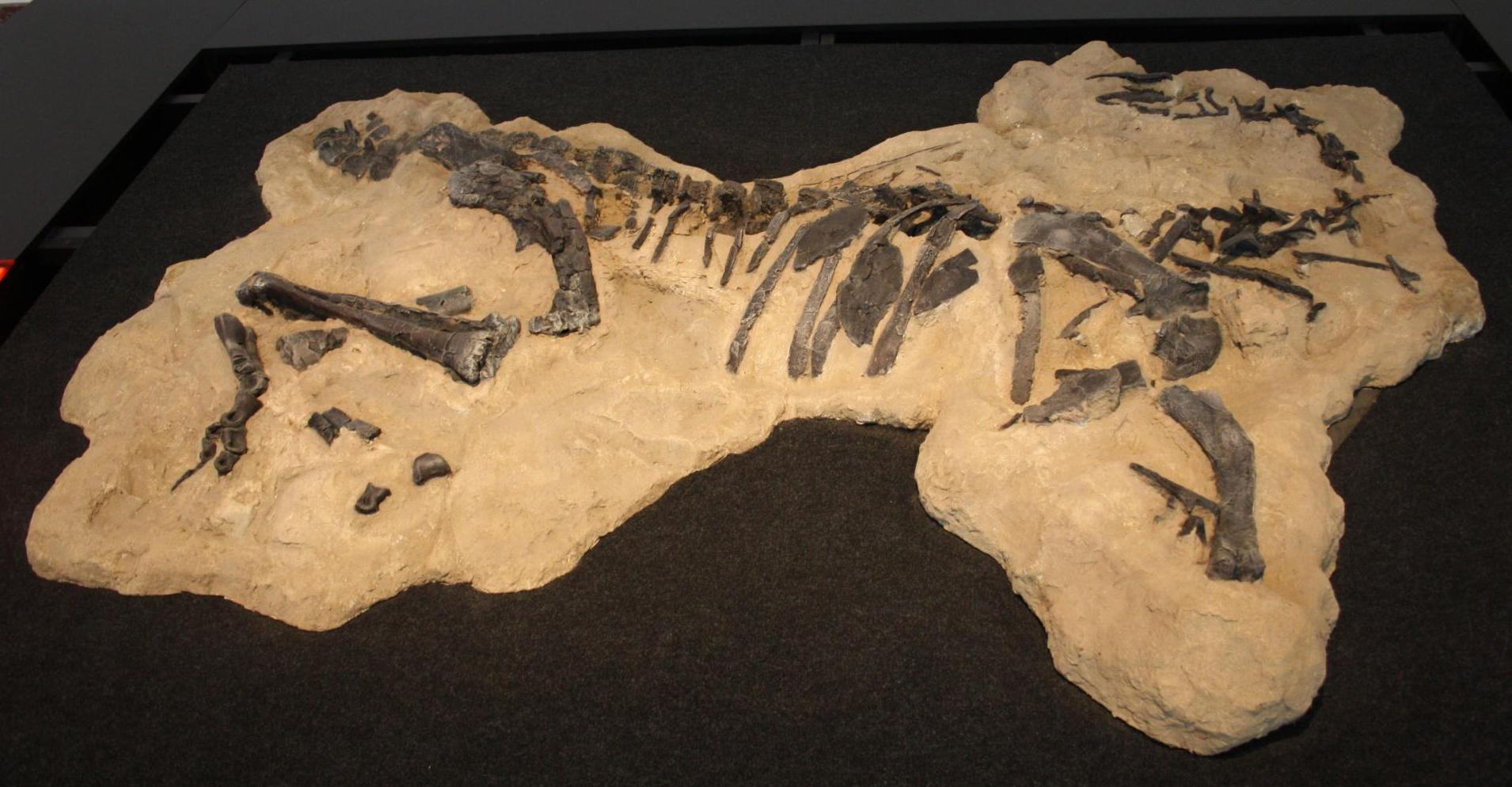
- Holotype MPM-10001

Scientific classification
- Kingdom: Animalia
- Phylum: Chordata
- Class: Reptilia
- Clade: Dinosauria
- Clade: †Ornithischia
- Clade: †Ornithopoda
- Clade: †Elasmaria
- Genus: †Talenkauen; Novas et al. 2004
- Species: †T. santacrucensis

Binomial name
- †Talenkauen santacrucensis Novas et al. 2004

= Talenkauen =

Talenkauen Temporal range: Campanian-Maastrichtian 76–70 Ma Late Cretaceous

Extinct genus of dinosaurs

Talenkauen is a genus of basal iguanodont dinosaur from the Campanian or Maastrichtian age of the Late Cretaceous Cerro Fortaleza Formation, formerly known as the Pari Aike Formation of Patagonian Lake Viedma, in the Austral Basin of Santa Cruz, Argentina. It is based on MPM-10001A, a partial articulated skeleton missing the rear part of the skull, the tail, and the hands. The type and only species is Talenkauen santacrucensis.

== Discovery and naming ==
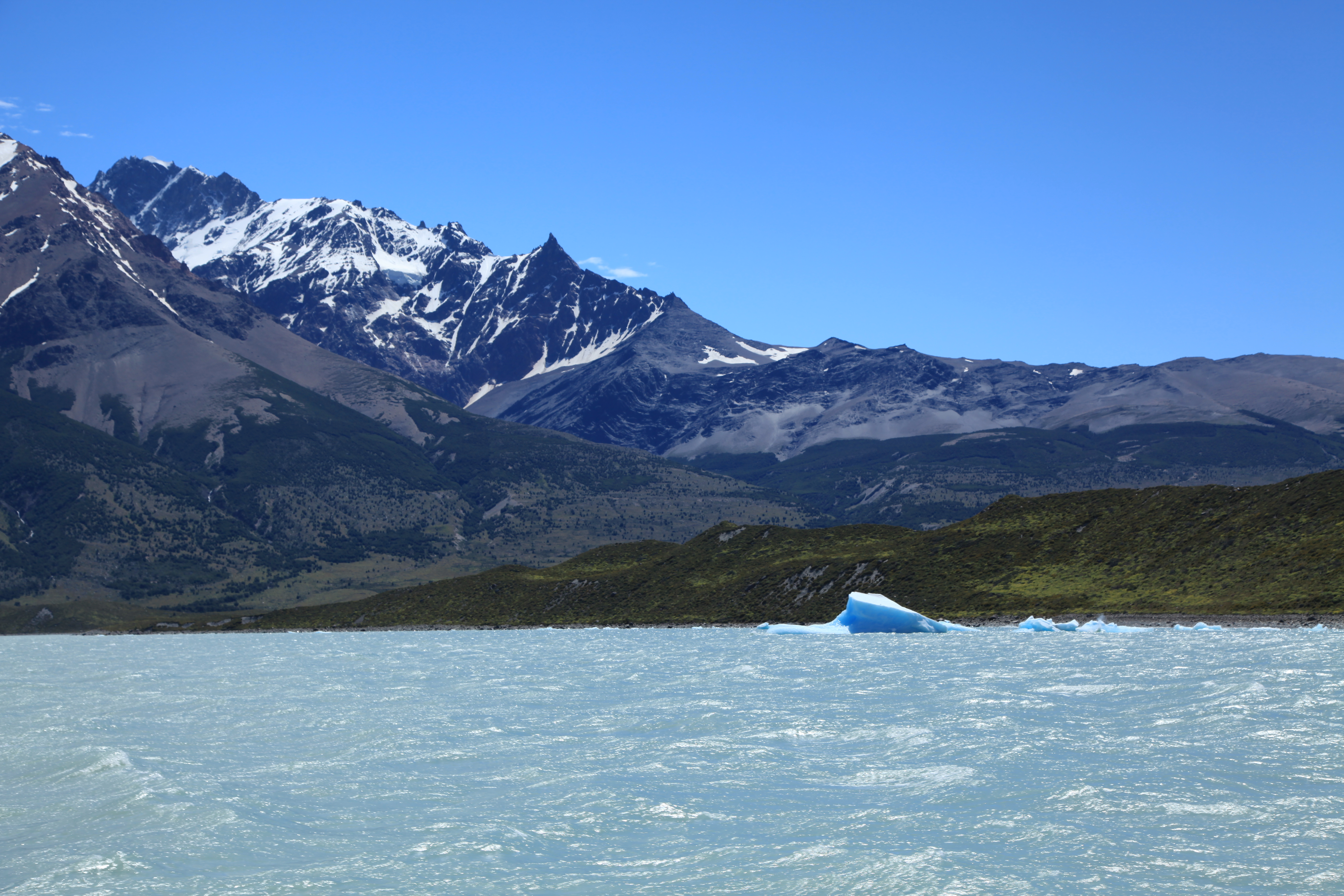
Lake Viedma, where the only known specimen of Talenkauen was found

One among a string of discoveries of ornithopods in South America, following taxa such as Gasparinisaura and Anabisetia, the specimen that would become Talenkauen was collected in February 2000 and would later be described and named in a short 2004 paper by Fernando E. Novas and colleagues. It was discovered on Los Hornos Hill on the coast of Viedma Lake, in the Santa Cruz Province region of Argentina. Geologically, it hails from the Cerro Fortaleza Formation. (Note: Talenkauen was originally reported as being from the "Pari Aike Formation" and later reported as instead being from the Mata Amarilla Formation. Geological studies found several names were being used for the same rock layers and advised use of the name Ceroo Fortaleza Formation over the former two as they were associated with incorrect dates or also used for other units.) The holotype specimen is MPM–10001A, a relatively complete and articulated skeleton. The name Talenkauen is derived from the words "Talenk, meaning small, and kauen, meaning skull, both from the Aonikenk language. The specific name santacrucensis refers to the province of Argentina where it was found. Following its original, preliminary description, the taxon was described more thoroughly described in an unpublished PhD dissertation in 2007 by Andrea V. Cambiaso. In 2020 an extensive description was published by Sebastián Rozadilla and colleagues.

It has been recognized that, nestled amongst the rock matrix of the holotype specimen, are a collection of minuscule bone fragments and teeth. Identifiable as the teeth of some degree of ornithopod, and associated with the adult specimen, this is considered to be a neonatal, or recently hatched, baby specimen of Talenkauen. It was described in a 2013 paper, which separated the specimen number MPM–10001 into MPM–10001A, for the adult specimen, and MPM–10001B, for the neonate. The specimen is one of only very few embryonic or hatchling ornithopod specimen, and was the very first discovered from the southern hemisphere. Wear on the tiny, 1.7mm wide tooth crowns indicate the individual had fed, meaning it was not an embryo and had hatched, but only recently before death. It was noted as possible that the adult had been practicing parental care due to the individuals being found together, but that more concrete evidence would be needed to confidently make such an assertion.

== Description ==
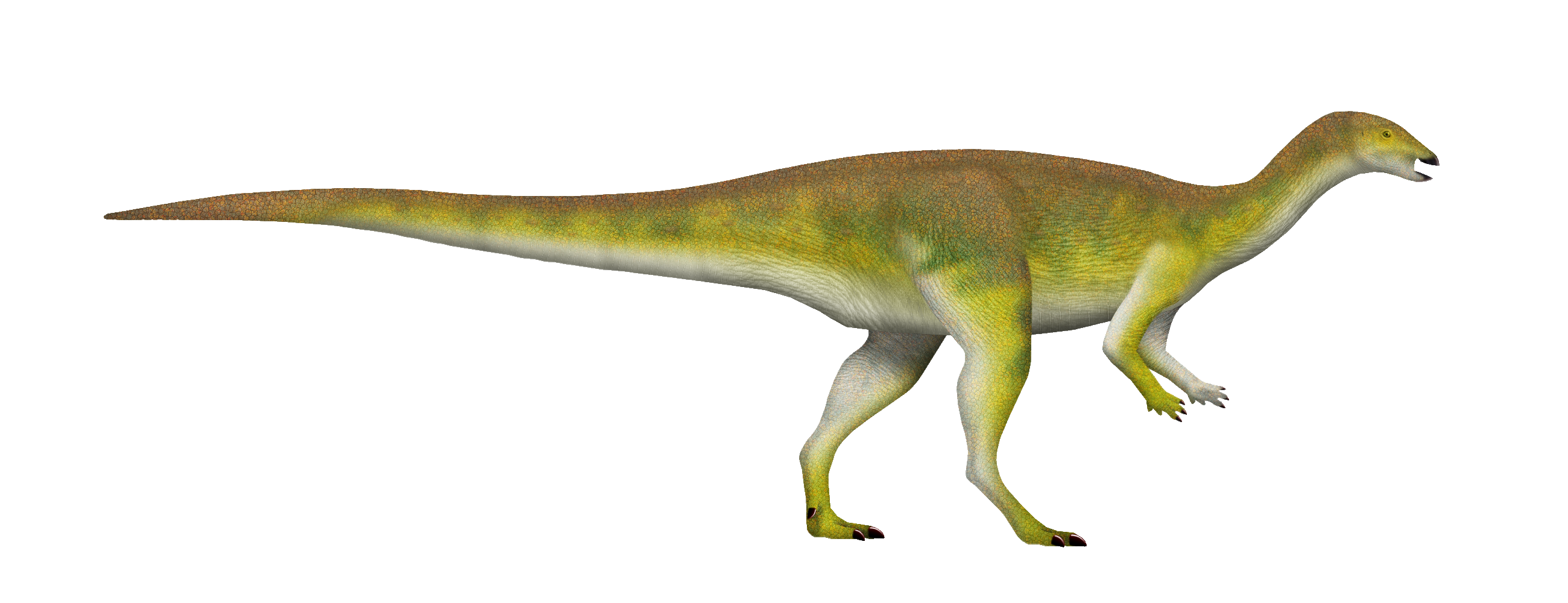
Life restoration

Talenkauen was rather like Dryosaurus in shape and build, but with a proportionally longer neck. The full length of the body is estimated at no more than 4 meters (13 feet). However, Gregory S. Paul gave a higher estimate of 4.7 m (15 ft) in length and 300 kg (660 lb) in body mass. Unlike more derived iguanodontians, it still had teeth in the tip of the beak (premaxillary teeth), and a first toe. More derived iguanodonts lose this toe, retaining only the three middle toes. The humerus has reduced areas for muscle attachment, a featured shared with other South American ornithopods like Notohypsilophodon and Anabisetia. This and other similarities to South American ornithopods suggests that there may have been a distinct Southern Hemisphere ornithopod group, but at the time the authors cautioned that such an interpretation was not entirely justified. In 2015, the describers of Morrosaurus found that such a clade did indeed exist.

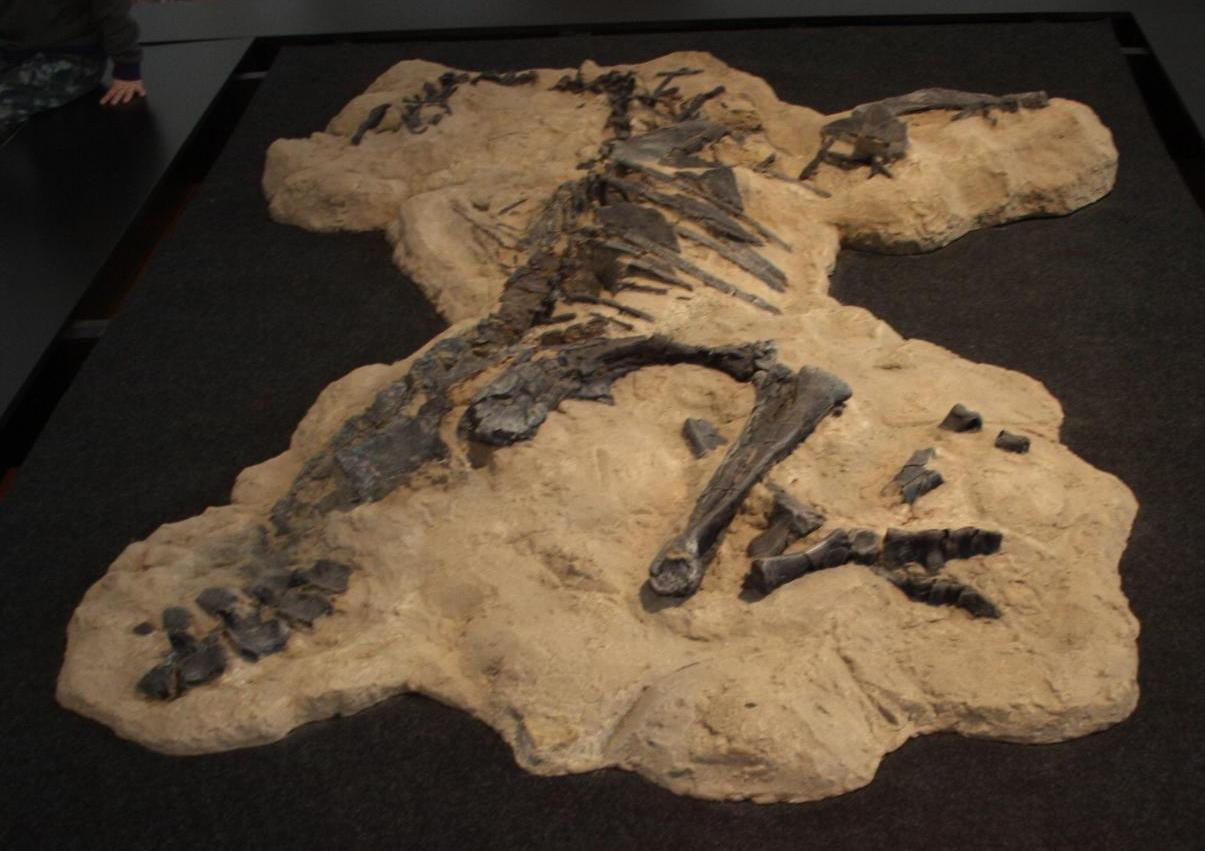
Alternate view of the holotype, MPM-10001

Talenkauen is most noted for a set of smooth, ovoid plates found along the side of the rib cage. These plates can be long (180 millimeters, or 7.1 in), but are very thin (only 3 millimeters thick [0.1 in]). They were present with at least the first eight ribs, attaching along the middle portion of a rib and lying flat. Several other dinosaurs are known to have had similar plates, including Hypsilophodon, Nanosaurus, Parksosaurus, Thescelosaurus, and Macrogryphosaurus (also from Argentina, but from somewhat older rocks), which may have been related. Because of the fragility of the plates, and the fact that they may not have always turned to bone in the living animal, they may have been more widespread than currently known. Novas and colleagues suggested that the plates may be homologous to uncinate processes, strip-like bony projections found on the ribs of a variety of animals including the tuatara, crocodiles, birds, and some maniraptoran theropod dinosaurs. In birds, uncinate processes help to ventilate the lungs, working with rib cage muscles, and Novas and colleagues proposed a similar function for the plates of Talenkauen. This homology was rejected in a more recent study by Richard Butler and Peter Galton because of the plates' form. The plates were too thin and limited in location to have been very useful as defensive devices.

== Classification ==
Through cladistic analysis, it was found to be more basal than Dryosaurus and Anabisetia, but more derived than Tenontosaurus and Gasparinisaura. More recently, the describers of Macrogryphosaurus found their genus and Talenkauen to be related, and coined the clade Elasmaria for the two genera. In 2015, several other Patagonian and Antarctic ornithopods were also found to be related.

The simplified cladogram below results from analysis by Rozadilla et al., 2019, showing all members of Elasmaria forming a polytomy.

- Clypeodonta
  - Hypsilophodon
  - - Elasmaria
      - Fulgurotherium
      - Trinisaura
      - Gasparinisaura
      - Qantassaurus
      - Notohypsilophodon
      - Morrosaurus
      - Kangnasaurus
      - Anabisetia
      - Atlascopcosaurus
      - Macrogryphosaurus
      - Talenkauen
    - Dryomorpha

== Palaeoecology ==
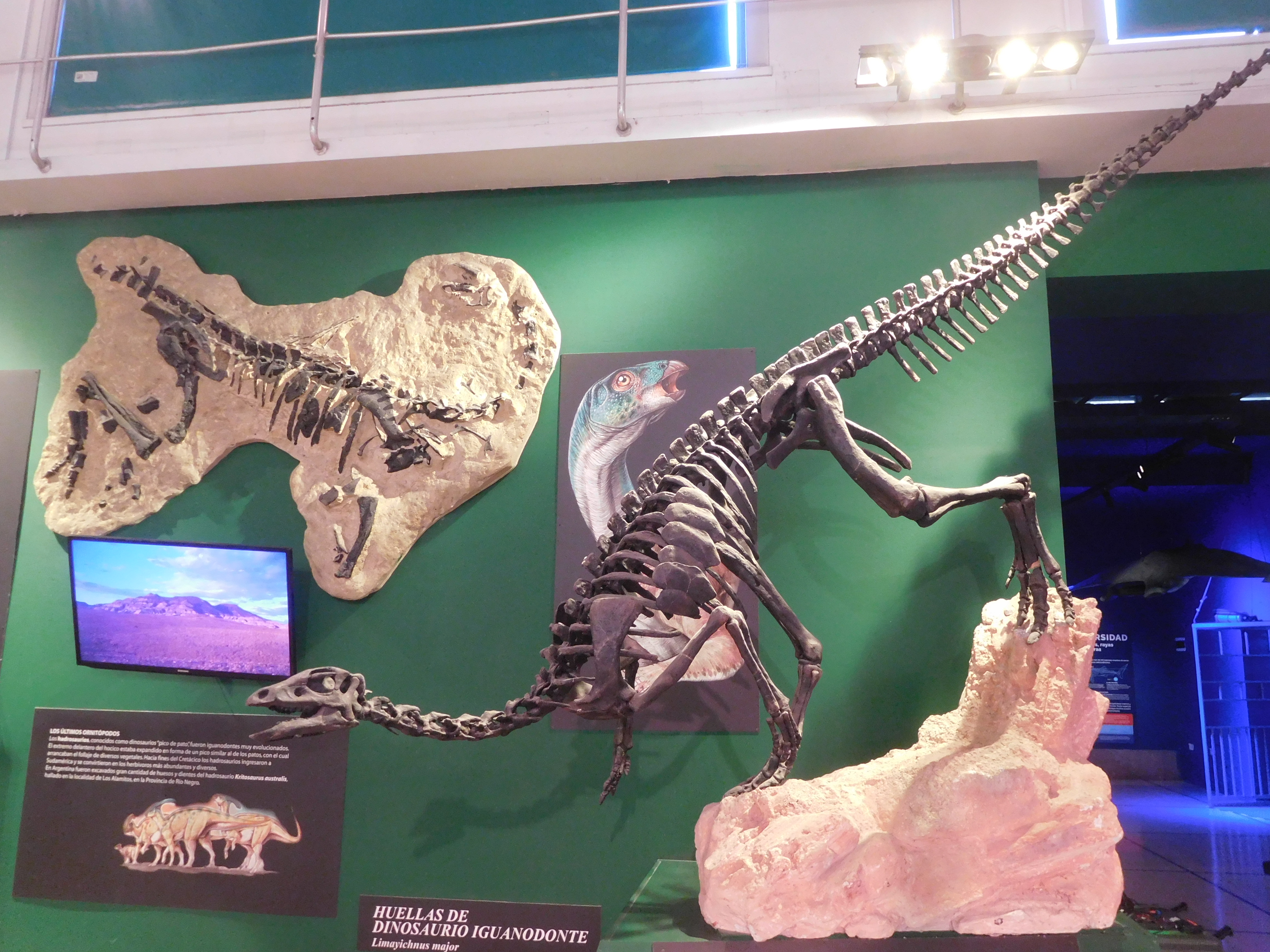
Reconstructed skeleton

Talenkauen, as a basal ornithopod, would have been a small, bipedal herbivore. Other dinosaurs from the Pari Aike Formation include the giant titanosaurid Puertasaurus and Dreadnoughtus and the large predatory theropod Orkoraptor.
