= Coihaique Group =

Geological formations in Patagonia

- Stratigraphic range: Late Jurassic–Aptian
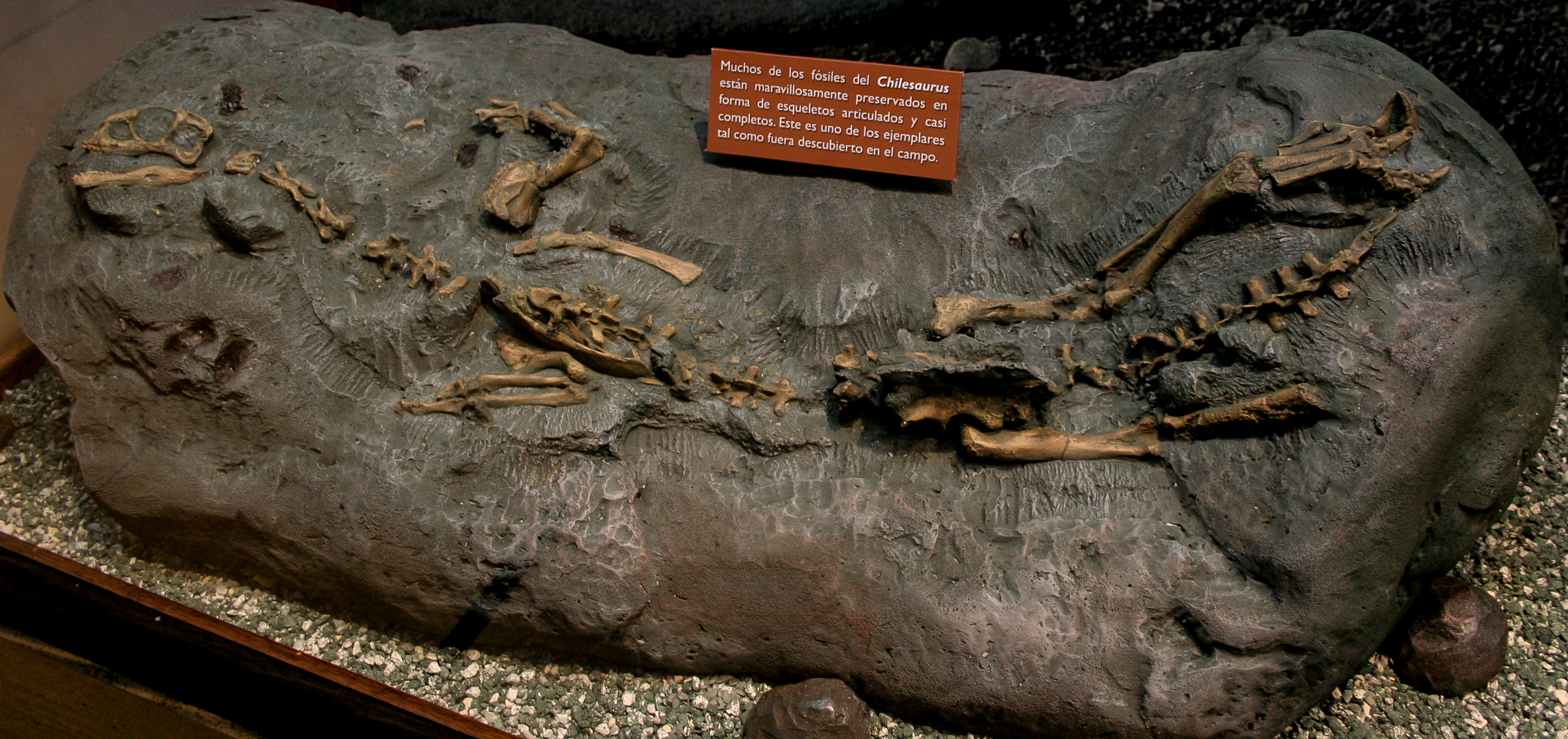
- Toqui Formation with Chilesaurus fossils
- Type: Geologic group
- Unit of: Aysén Basin
- Sub-units: Apeleg Formation; Katterfeld Formation; Toqui Formation
- Underlies: Divisadero Group
- Overlies: Ibáñez Formation

Lithology
- Primary: Shale, volcaniclastic rocks, sandstone
- Other: Turbidite

Location
- Region: Aysén Region, Patagonia
- Country: Chile

The Coihaique Group is a group of geological formations in northwestern Patagonia. From top to bottom the formations that make the group are Apeleg, Katterfeld and Toqui. The contact between the formations of the group are diachronous with Katterfeld Formation interfingering with the formations on top and below it. The lower and upper boundaries of the group are unconformities formed by erosion. The older parts of Coihaique Group represent a marine transgression while the younger parts evidences a return to non-marine conditions.

== Fossils in Toqui Formation ==
The rock formation preserves fossils from the Late Jurassic period of the Mesozoic Era.

Fossils of Chilesaurus (147 Ma) were found in the Aysén Region of Patagonia. It is an extinct genus of theropods in the family Tetanurae. The fossil record also comprises a sauropod Titanosaur, a Camarasaur and a Diplodocid.

== See also ==
- Geology of Aysén Region
- Geology of Chile
- Tobífera Formation
