= Cordillera Darwin Metamorphic Complex =

Geological unit in Tierra del Fuego

- Stratigraphic range: Cretaceous
- Type: Complex
- Underlies: Tobífera Formation

Lithology
- Primary: Metasediments, metavolcanics, orthogneiss

Location
- Coordinates: 54.75°S 69.5°W
- Region: Magallanes Region, Tierra del Fuego Province (Argentina)
- Country: Chile

Type section
- Named for: Cordillera Darwin
- Cordillera Darwin Metamorphic Complex (Chile)

The Cordillera Darwin Metamorphic Complex is a geologic complex composed chiefly of metamorphic rocks located in southern Tierra del Fuego. It has been suggested that the Cordillera Darwin Metamorphic Complex is analogous to the Eastern Andes Metamorphic Complex. The Cordillera Darwin Metamorphic Complex is the only metamorphic complex in the southern Andes known to have amphibolite facies rocks containing kyanite and sillimanite which evidences high-grade metamorphism. High-grade metamorphism took place during the Cretaceous purportedly in association with the closure of the Rocas Verdes Basin.

The protoliths of Cordillera Darwin Metamorphic Complex are unrelated to Tierra del Fuego Igneous and Metamorphic Complex despite present-day proximity.
