= Cardiel Formation =

Geologic formation in Argentina

- Stratigraphic range: Maastrichtian
- Type: Geological formation
- Underlies: Slogget & San Julián Formations
- Overlies: Divisadero & Kachaike Formations

Lithology
- Primary: Sandstone, conglomerate
- Other: Tuff

Location
- Coordinates: 49.0°S 71.4°W
- Approximate paleocoordinates: 50.9°S 60.9°W
- Region: Santa Cruz Province
- Country: Argentina
- Extent: Austral Basin

Type section
- Named for: Lake Cardiel
- Named by: Russo & Flores
- Year defined: 1971
- Cardiel Formation (Argentina)

The Cardiel Formation is a Maastrichtian geologic formation of the Austral Basin in Santa Cruz Province, Argentina. The formation comprises sandstones and conglomerates with abundant tuff beds. The formation is overlain by the Slogget and San Julián Formations and overlies the Divisadero and Kachaike Formations. Dinosaur remains diagnostic to the genus level are among the fossils that have been recovered from the formation.

== Paleofauna ==
- Clasmodosaurus spatula - Teeth - (sauropod indet)
- "Loncosaurus argentinus" (ornithopod indet.) - Femur. This genus may have also been found in the Matasiete Formation.

== See also ==
- List of dinosaur-bearing rock formations
  - List of stratigraphic units with few dinosaur genera
- Allen Formation
