= Choapa Metamorphic Complex =

Geologic complex in Chile

- Type: Complex

Lithology
- Primary: Quartz micaschist, phyllite, amphibolitic schist

Location
- Region: Coquimbo Region
- Country: Chile

Type section
- Named for: Choapa River

The Choapa Metamorphic Complex or ChMC is a large coherent but varied group of metamorphic rocks—in other words, a geologic complex—that crops out in the Chilean Coast Range in northern Chile. The rocks of the formation have been metamorphosed under greenschist facies metamorphism. After the main phase of metamorphism the rocks of the complex were heated by plutons in the Jurassic. It has been suggested that the protoliths of the formation were similar and equivalent to the Paleozoic-aged Puerto Manso Formation.

The complex is named after Choapa River.
