= Río Belgrano Formation =

Geologic formation in southern Argentina

- Stratigraphic range: Barremian-Aptian
- Type: Geological formation
- Unit of: Pueyrredón Group
- Underlies: Río Tarde Formation
- Overlies: Río Mayer Formation

Lithology
- Primary: Sandstone

Location
- Coordinates: 48.0°S 72.0°W
- Approximate paleocoordinates: 48.0°S 35.5°W
- Region: Santa Cruz Province
- Country: Argentina
- Extent: Austral Basin
- Río Belgrano Formation (Argentina)

The Río Belgrano Formation is a Barremian to Aptian geologic formation of the Austral Basin in Patagonia, southern Argentina. Among others, pterosaur and ichthyosaur fossils have been recovered from the formation.

== Fossil content ==
The following fossils have been recovered from the formation:

- Hatchericeras patagonense
- Palaeastacus terraereginae
- Platypterygius hauthali
- Sanmartinoceras africanum
- Tonohamites aequicingulatus
- ?Anhangueridae indet.

== See also ==
- List of pterosaur-bearing stratigraphic units
