= Tierra del Fuego Igneous and Metamorphic Complex =

Tierra Igneous and Metamorphic Complex
- Stratigraphic range: Cambrian
- Type: Complex
- Underlies: Tobífera Formation

Lithology
- Primary: Orthogneiss

Location
- Coordinates: 54.5°S 67.16°W
- Region: Magallanes Region; Tierra del Fuego Province
- Country: Chile, Argentina

Type section
- Named for: Tierra del Fuego
- Tierra del Fuego Igneous and Metamorphic Complex (Chile)

Tierra del Fuego Igneous and Metamorphic Complex is a geological basement complex known from boreholes in northern Tierra del Fuego. The complex is made up of foliated igneous rocks of Cambrian age including orthogneiss. It underlies unconformably the Jurassic Tobífera Formation. The protoliths of Cordillera Darwin Metamorphic Complex are unrelated to Tierra del Fuego Igneous and Metamorphic Complex despite present-day proximity.
