= Colorado Formation =

Colorado or Colorados Formation may refer to:

== Argentina ==
- Colorado Formation, Argentina, a Campanian geologic formation of La Pampa Province
- Los Colorados Formation, a Triassic geologic formation of La Rioja and San Juan Provinces
- Los Colorados Formation, Paleogene, a Paleogene geologic formation of Salta Province; see Salta Basin
- Quebrada de los Colorados Formation, an Eocene geologic formation of Salta Province; see Salta Basin
- Cañón del Colorado Formation, an Early Jurassic geologic formation of San Juan Province
- Río Colorado Subgroup, a Late Cretaceous geologic subgroup of Neuquén and Río Negro Provinces

== Elsewhere ==
- Colorado Group, a Late Cretaceous geologic unit of the United States and Canada
- Cerro Colorado Formation, an Early Cretaceous geologic formation of Chile
- Colorado Formation, Colombia, an Oligocene geologic formation of Colombia; see Middle Magdalena Valley § Third sequence
- Colorado City Formation, a Late Triassic geologic formation of Texas

== See also ==
- Chinle Formation, on the Colorado Plateau, southwestern United States
