= Eastern Andes Metamorphic Complex =

- Type: Complex

Lithology
- Primary: Deformed turbidite, limestone, metabasite

Location
- Region: Aysén Region, Magallanes Region, Santa Cruz Province
- Country: Chile, Argentina

Type section
- Named for: Position relative to the Andes

The Eastern Andes Metamorphic Complex is a large coherent but varied group of metamorphic and sedimentary rocks –in other words a geologic complex – that crops out in the eastern Patagonian Andes in Chile and Argentina. The metamorphic grade of rocks varies but does not exceed greenschist facies, the only exception to this are rocks near plutons affected by contact metamorphism. The sedimentary protoliths sedimented in the Late Paleozoic. The pressures and temperatures of metamorphism of the Eastern Andes Metamorphic Complex are different those usually expected from accretionary complexes. The sedimentary protoliths of the Eastern Andes Metamorphic Complex were likely deposited in a passive continental margin.

Cordillera Darwin Metamorphic Complex shows affinity with the Eastern Andes Metamorphic Complex albeit both complexes lie hundreds of kilometers from each other.
