= Cerro Plataforma Formation =

Geologic formation in Argentina

- Stratigraphic range: Early Miocene
- Type: Geological formation
- Underlies: Mid Miocene volcaniclastics
- Overlies: Divisadero Group
- Thickness: 130 m (430 ft)

Lithology
- Primary: Sandstone, siltstone, conglomerate

Location
- Coordinates: 42°21′29.0″S 71°48′09.6″W
- Region: Chubut Province
- Country: Argentina
- Extent: Patagonian Andes

Type section
- Named for: Cerro Plataforma
- Cerro Plataforma Formation (Argentina)

The Cerro Plataforma Formation is a sedimentary formation cropping out at Cerro Plataforma south of Puelo Lake in the Andes of Argentine Patagonia. The formation contains marine fossils of bivalves, gastropods and echinoderms.

To the southwest in Chile lies the geologically equivalent La Cascada Formation.
