= Vargas Formation =

Geologic formation in Chile

- Stratigraphic range: Late Oligocene–Early Miocene
- Type: Geological formation

Lithology
- Primary: Black shale, sandstone

Location
- Region: Los Lagos Region
- Country: Chile

Type section
- Named by: Urbina
- Year defined: 2001

The Vargas Formation is a sedimentary formation on the left bank of Palena River in the western Patagonian Andes of southern Chile. The formation is made of black shale and sandstone that deposited in the Late Oligocene or Early Miocene epoch some 26 million years ago. The formation has contact across a fault plane with granitoids of Cretaceous age of the North Patagonian Batholith.

The exposures of Vargas Formation are small and its fossils poorly preserved. Gastropods, bivalves, echinoderms, and planktic foraminifer fossils have been found in the formation.

Hans Steffen was the first to investigate Vargas Formation with his research being published in 1944.

== See also ==
- Geology of Chile
- Chaicayán Group
- Ayacara Formation
- La Cascada Formation
- Puduhuapi Formation
