= Divisadero =

Divisadero may refer to:

== Places ==
=== Mexico ===
- Divisadero, Chihuahua, a town on the Ferrocarril Chihuahua al Pacífico (Copper Canyon railroad)
- Divisaderos, Sonora

=== United States ===
- Divisadero Street, in San Francisco
- Divisadero Street, in Visalia, California

== Other ==
- Divisadero (novel), a novel by Canadian author Michael Ondaatje
- Divisadero Group, a group of geologic formation the Patagonian Andes
