= Quebrada del Carrizo Metamorphic Complex =

- Type: Complex
- Underlies: Llano Las Vicuñas ignimbrites

Lithology
- Primary: Mica schist, greenschist

Location
- Region: Atacama Region
- Country: Chile

Type section
- Named for: Quebrada del Carrizo

The Quebrada del Carrizo Metamorphic Complex is a geological complex of metamorphic rocks that crops out in Quebrada del Carrizo Creek next to the Cordillera Domeyko in the Atacama Desert of Chile. The Quebrada del Carrizo Metamorphic Complex is part of a larger accretionary complex in northern Chile that was an active accretionary wedge in the Late Paleozoic.

Most of the complex is covered by the Miocene welded tuffs of the Llano Las Vicuñas ignimbrites. The sedimentary protolith of the formation was deposited in the Late Paleozoic. The protoliths sediments arrived from the east with some lesser amounts arriving from as far as the cratons of the interior of South America.
