= La Irene Formation =

Geologic formation in Argentina

- Stratigraphic range: Maastrichtian; ~70–66 Ma
- Type: Geological formation
- Underlies: Chorrillo Formation
- Overlies: Cerro Fortaleza Formation
- Thickness: 230 m (750 ft)

Lithology
- Primary: Sandstone
- Other: Shale

Location
- Location: Patagonia
- Coordinates: 50.4°S 72.2°W
- Approximate paleocoordinates: 52.3°S 62.0°W
- Region: Santa Cruz Province
- Country: Argentina
- Extent: Austral Basin
- La Irene Formation (Argentina)

La Irene Formation is a Maastrichtian geologic formation in southern Patagonia, Argentina. The formation is 230 metres (750 ft) thick and underlies the Chorrillo Formation and rests on top of the Cerro Fortaleza Formation.

== Description ==
The formation comprises lithified, sandy sandstones and lithified, argillaceous, sandy shales deposited in a fluvial deltaic environment.

At the base of Cerro Calafate a column of about 230 metres (750 ft) in thickness was measured along the road. The 110 m below represent a succession of sandy banks clear yellowish brown color to white and dark pelitic packages fining upwards cycles are stacked to form a sequence with a clear trend growing grain and stratum. Sandy banks (coarse to fine sand) show increasing thickness from 2 m at the base to more than 9 m, whereas intercalated mudstones show an opposite trend with thickness ranging from 15 m at the base to 1 m. At the top of lower shaly packets (the thickest) are preserved carbonaceous shale intervals, thinly laminated. 120 m above correspond to a succession of amalgamated conglomeratic sandy banks where preservation is extremely rare shaly intervals.

== Fossil content ==
The formation has provided many fossil pollen of:

- Podocarpaceae
- Monocotyledoneae
- Liliidae
- Cycadopsida
- Pteridopsida
- Polypodiopsida
- Schizaeaceae
- Gleicheniaceae
- Selaginellaceae
- Lycopodiaceae
- Magnoliopsida
- Dinophyceae
