= Puduhuapi Formation =

Sedimentary formation in Chile

- Stratigraphic range: Miocene
- Type: Geological formation
- Thickness: c. 35 m (115 ft)

Lithology
- Primary: Sandstone, siltstone, conglomerate

Location
- Coordinates: 42°19′08.1″S 73°14′10.3″W
- Region: Los Lagos Region
- Country: Chile
- Extent: Puduhuapi Island

Type section
- Named for: Puduhuapi Island
- Named by: Levi et al.
- Year defined: 1966
- Puduhuapi Formation (Chile)

The Puduhuapi Formation is a sedimentary formation whose only known outcrops are on Puduhuapi Island of the Chiloé Archipelago, west of Chaitén in western Patagonia, Chile. Lithologies vary from sandstone and siltstone to conglomerate. The sediment that now forms the rock deposited during the Miocene no earlier than 23 million years ago.

== See also ==
- Geology of Chile
- Chaicayán Group
- Ayacara Formation
- La Cascada Formation
- Vargas Formation
