= La Cascada Formation =

Geologic formation in Chile

- Stratigraphic range: Late Oligocene–Early Miocene
- Type: Geological formation
- Overlies: Cretaceous granitoids Divisadero Group; Lower Jurassic volcanic rocks
- Thickness: 130 m (430 ft)

Lithology
- Primary: Sandstone, siltstone, conglomerate

Location
- Region: Los Lagos Region
- Country: Chile

Type section
- Named by: Thiele et al.
- Year defined: 1978

La Cascada Formation a sedimentary formation near Futaleufú in the western Patagonian Andes of southern Chile. Lithologies vary from sandstone, siltstone and conglomerate. The sediment that now forms the rock deposited during the Oligocene and Early Miocene epoch in shallow marine environment. The formation contain fossils of bivalves and gastropods.

The formation unconformably overlies sedimentary rock of Jurassic age, Cretaceous sedimentary rocks of Divisadero Group and Cretaceous granite plutons.

Further south in Aysén Region, the Guadal Formation is a geologically equivalent formation.

== See also ==
- Geology of Chile
- Chaicayán Group
- Ayacara Formation
- Puduhuapi Formation
- Vargas Formation
