= Laguna Colorada Formation =

Geological formation in Argentina

- Stratigraphic range: Early Jurassic <192.8 Ma
- Type: Geological formation
- Unit of: El Tranquilo Group

Lithology
- Primary: Siltstone
- Other: dolomite

Location
- Coordinates: 48.1°S 68.3°W
- Approximate paleocoordinates: 56.7°S 24.8°W
- Region: Santa Cruz Province
- Country: Argentina
- Extent: Austral Basin
- Laguna Colorada Formation (Argentina)

The Laguna Colorada Formation is a geological formation of the Austral Basin in Patagonia, Argentina. The formation belongs to the El Tranquilo Group and dates back to the Early Jurassic, with a maximum age of 192.78 ± 0.14 Ma.

== Vertebrate paleofauna ==
Dinosaur tracks geographically located in Santa Cruz Province, Argentina.

Color key: Taxon / Reclassified taxon / Taxon falsely reported as present / Dubious taxon or junior synonym / Ichnotaxon / Ootaxon / Morphotaxon	Notes; Uncertain or tentative taxa are in small text; ~~crossed out~~ taxa are discredited.

=== Dinosaurs ===
Dinosaurs of the Laguna Colorada Formation
Genus	Species	Location	Material	Notes	Images
Mussaurus	M. patagonicus	Santa Cruz Province	"More than [ten] fragmentary to complete skeletons, [four] skulls, juvenile to adult"	A anchisaurian sauropodomorph	
Heterodontosauridae indet.	Ineterminate	Santa Cruz Province			

== See also ==
- List of dinosaur-bearing rock formations
