= Chaicayán Group =

- Stratigraphic range: Miocene
- Type: Group
- Overlies: Metamorphic basement

Lithology
- Primary: Sandstone, siltstone
- Other: Conglomerate

Location
- Region: Aysén Region
- Country: Chile

Type section
- Named by: Forsythe et al., 1985

Chaicayán Group is a group of poorly defined sedimentary rock strata found in the Taitao Peninsula on the west coast of Patagonia. The most common rock types are siltstone and sandstone. Conglomerates occur but are less common.

Study of fossils and uranium–lead dating of detrital zircons indicates a Miocene age, at least for the upper sequences. The Chaicayán Group was deposited likely due to a marine transgression that drowned much of Patagonia and Central Chile in the Late Oligocene and Miocene.

The group is intruded by porphyritic stocks and sills of Pliocene age.

== See also ==
- Geology of Chile
- Ayacara Formation
- La Cascada Formation
- Puduhuapi Formation
- Vargas Formation
