= El Tranquilo Group =

- Stratigraphic range: Late Triassic; ~228–200 Ma
- Type: Geologic group
- Sub-units: Laguna Colorada Formation

Lithology
- Primary: Sandstone

Location
- Coordinates: 48.1°S 69.5°W
- Approximate paleocoordinates: 57.0°S 26.2°W
- Region: Santa Cruz Province
- Country: Argentina
- Extent: Austral Basin
- El Tranquilo Group (Argentina)

The El Tranquilo Group is a geologic group dating to roughly between 228 and 200 million years ago and covering part of the Late Triassic. The El Tranquilo Group is found in the Austral Basin of Santa Cruz Province of Argentina. Fossil flora and purported fossils of the prosauropod dinosaur Mussaurus have been recovered from the El Tranquilo Sandstone. In older publications, the group was defined as a formation. The group contains the Laguna Colorada Formation.
