= Río Mayer Formation =

Geologic formation in Argentina

- Stratigraphic range: Berriasian-Hauterivian
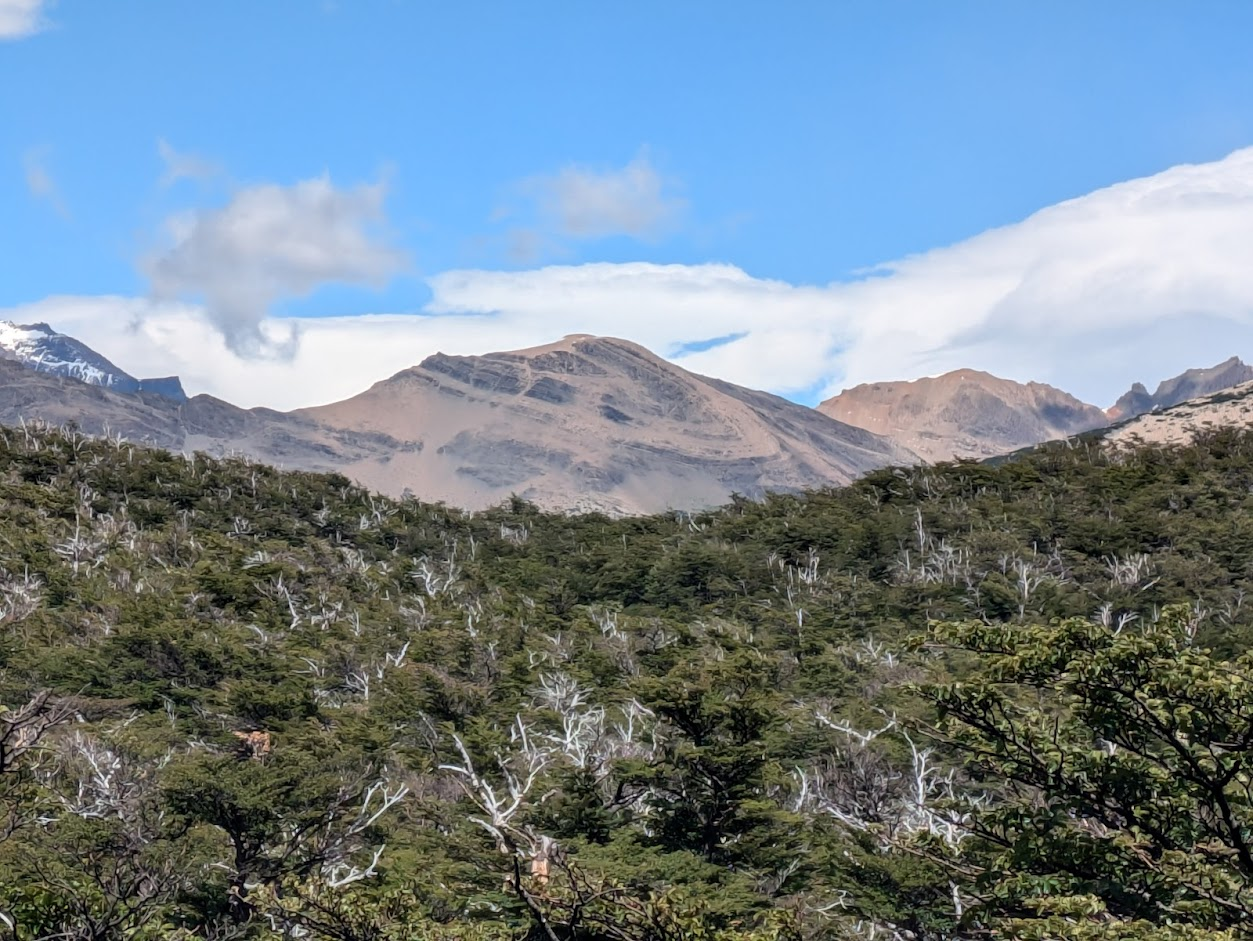
- Tightly folded Río Mayer Formation on the Loma del Pliegue Tumbado near El Chaltén, Argentina
- Type: Geological formation
- Underlies: Cerro Torro, Largo Viedma & Piedra Clavada formations
- Overlies: Tobífera & Springhill formations
- Thickness: 350 m

Lithology
- Primary: Shale
- Other: Turbiditic sandstone, pyrite

Location
- Coordinates: 49.5°S 73.0°W
- Region: Magallanes y la Antártica Chilena & Aysén Region regions Santa Cruz Province
- Country: Argentina
- Extent: Magallanes or Austral Basin

Type section
- Named for: Rio Mayer
- Río Mayer Formation (Argentina)

The Río Mayer Formation is sequence of sedimentary rocks of Early Cretaceous age that form part of the northern Magallanes Basin (Austral Basin) in Santa Cruz Province, Argentina. It is a lateral equivalent of the Zapata Formation, as described in Chile further south within the same basin.

== Tectonic setting ==
The Río Mayer Formation and it lateral stratigraphic equivalents form part of the post-rift sequence following the major back-arc rifting event in the Jurassic, which was associated with the formation of a significant back-arc basin, greater than 100 km wide, the Rocas Verdes Basin. The rifting was accompanied by eruption of a thick sequence of silica-rich volcanic rocks, forming the Chon Aike Large Igneous Province. The back-arc rifting is interpreted to have propagated northwards, leading to a northwards-narrowing rift. During the late Cretaceous, the basin closed up, locally with obduction of back-arc basin oceanic crust, forming ophiolites, and the development of a major fold and thrust belt, accommodating 100s of kms of shortening. After deposition of the Río Mayer Formation, the Magallanes Basin shows a transition to a foreland basin, related to this shortening.

== Stratigraphy ==
The Río Mayer Formation lies conformably above the Springhill Formation, which marks the ending of the rift episode, infilling the rift topography. The top of this formation varies from uppermost Jurassic to Lower Cretaceous (uppermost Valanginian) going from south to north within the basin. To the south, in the Largo Argentino and Río Guanaco areas, the Rio Mayer Formation is overlain by the Cerro Toro Formation. Further north, the younger sequence is formed by the Lago Viedma Formation in the Lago Viedma area and the Piedra Clavada Formation in the Lago San Martin area.

== Depositional environment ==
The sequence is entirely marine in character, following on from the Springhill Formation, which is interpreted to represent deposition in a continental environment changing to a marine environment following a transgression.

== Structure ==
This overall fine-grained sequence is generally highly deformed, with the development of tight asymmetric folds, such as the overturned syncline that outcrops on the Loma del Pliegue Tumbado (literally the hill of the recumbent fold) and the nearby Loma de las Pizarras, west of El Chaltén. The boundaries with the older Jurassic rhyolites of the El Quemado Complex are all marked with thrust faults.
