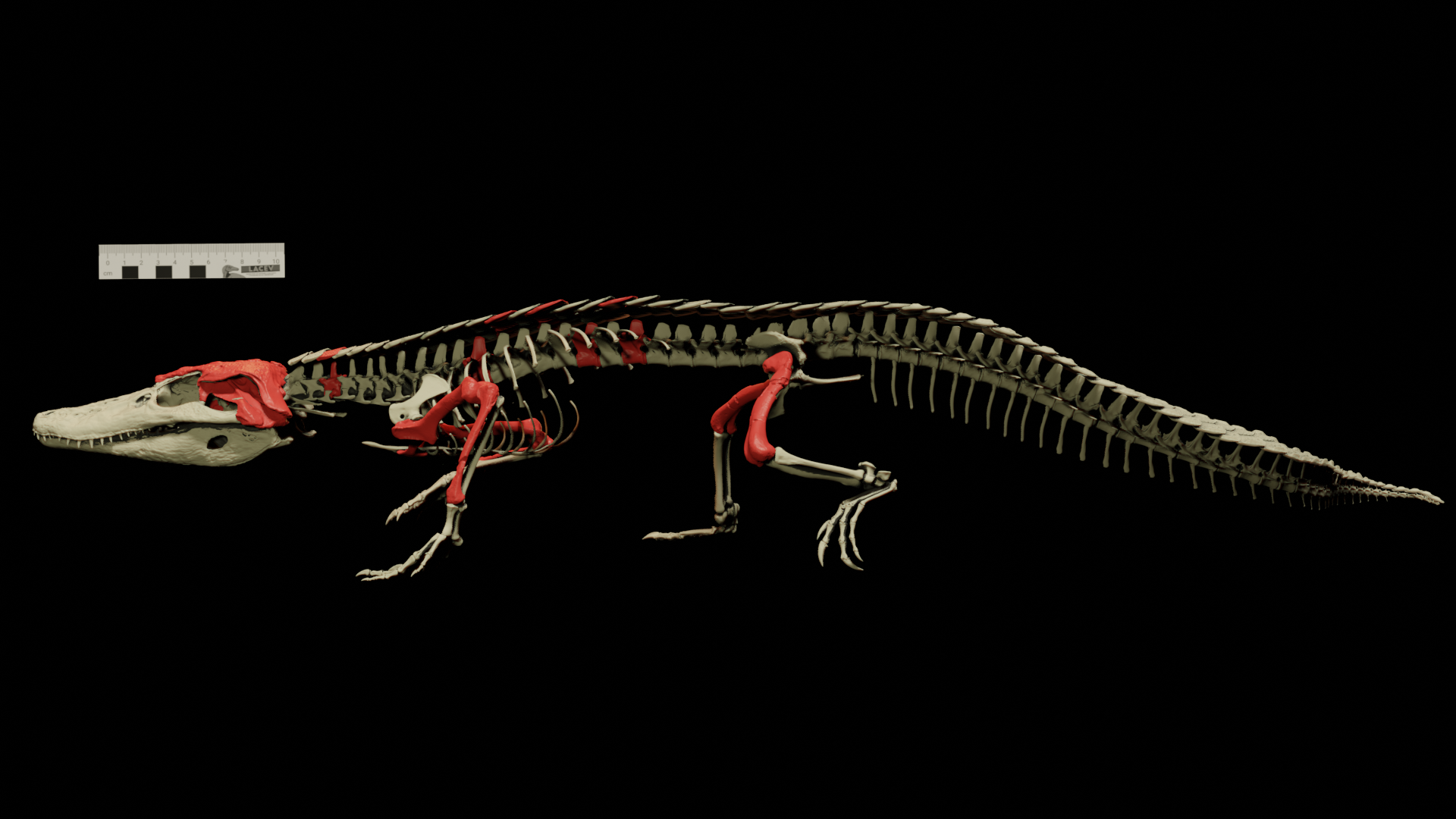
- Computer reconstruction, with red bones corresponding to the original material

Scientific classification
- Domain: Eukaryota
- Kingdom: Animalia
- Phylum: Chordata
- Class: Reptilia
- Clade: Archosauria
- Clade: Pseudosuchia
- Clade: Crocodylomorpha
- Clade: Neosuchia
- Genus: †Burkesuchus; Novas et al., 2021
- Species: †B. mallingrandensis

Binomial name
- †Burkesuchus mallingrandensis Novas et al., 2021

= Burkesuchus =

Burkesuchus Temporal range: Late Jurassic, 147.1–146.9 Ma

Extinct genus of reptiles

Burkesuchus is an extinct genus of basal neosuchians from the Upper Jurassic (Tithonian)-aged Toqui Formation of southern Chile. The genus is currently represented by a single species B. mallingrandensis, named and described in 2021 on the basis of the holotype and additional referred specimens. Burkesuchus mallingrandensis was noticeably small being around an estimated 70 cm (27.5 inches) in length. The cranium is dorsoventrally depressed and transversely wide posteriorly and distinguished by a posteroventrally flexed wing-like squamosal. Burkesuchus was a small carnivore likely on invertebrates animals such as insects, crustaceans and may had feed on small aquatic vertebrates like fish. B. mallingrandensis did not have the ability to feed on large prey items or tear large chunks of meat like modern day crocodiles do. The holotype SQO.PV 17700, consist of a cervical neural arch, partial neurocranium, four dorsal vertebrae, right scapula, a right coracoid, right humerus, a ulna, left ischium, distal end of the right femur, one cervical and two dorsal osteoderms. The paratype SQO.PV 17701 fossil remains consist of a nearly complete right femur, two doral vertebrae and one dorsal osteoderm. The fossils was discovered in 2014 but was described as a new genus and species on July 23, 2021.

== Phylogeny ==
Burkesuchus mallingrandensis belonged to the Mesoeucrocodylia clade which includes all living crocodiles and other relatives.

Below is a cladogram showing the phylogenetic placement of Burkesuchus according to Novas et al. (2021):

- Mesoeucrocodylia
  - Stolokrosuchus
  - Notosuchia
  - Uruguaysuchidae
  - - Mahajangasuchidae
    - Peirosauridae
  - Neosuchia
    - Burkesuchus
    - - - Alligatorium
        - Theriosuchus
      - - Thalattosuchia
        - - Pholidosaurus
          - - - Sarcosuchus
              - Terminonaris
            - - Sokotosuchus
              - - Dyrosaurus
                - Hyposaurus
                - Rhabdognathus
      - - - Goniopholis simus
          - - - Calsoyasuchus
              - Sunosuchus
            - - Eutretauranosuchus
              - Goniopholis stovalli
        - - Bernissartia
          - - - Rugosuchus
              - Shamosuchus
            - - Hylaeochampsa
              - Eusuchia
