= Clasmodosaurus =

Clasmodosaurus Temporal range: Late Cretaceous

Scientific classification
- Kingdom: Animalia
- Phylum: Chordata
- Class: Reptilia
- Clade: Dinosauria
- Clade: Saurischia
- Clade: †Sauropodomorpha
- Clade: †Sauropoda
- Clade: †Macronaria
- Clade: †Titanosauria
- Genus: †Clasmodosaurus; Ameghino, 1898
- Species: †C. spatula

Binomial name
- †Clasmodosaurus spatula Ameghino, 1898

Extinct genus of dinosaurs

Clasmodosaurus (meaning "fragmentary tooth reptile") is a genus of titanosaurian sauropod dinosaur from the Mata Amarilla Formation and the Cerro Fortaleza Formation. It lived during the Late Cretaceous in what is now Argentina. It is known from five fossilized and assorted teeth, but is diagnosed by a unique combination of characters.

== History ==
Clasmodosaurus was named by Florentino Ameghino in 1898, but remained largely unknown for decades after its discovery. It was originally considered a sauropod, but Friedrich von Huene suggested that it could be a coelurosaur or synonymous with Loncosaurus, which he considered to be a carnosaur. Like Loncosaurus, its taxonomy remained unclear with it regarded as a theropod on the rare occasions it was mentioned. However, Jaime Powell suggested that it was a dubious genus of sauropod in 1986, an identification which has been accepted since. Like diplodocoids and titanosaurs, it had narrow tooth crowns, and it is typically regarded as a titanosaur like most Late Cretaceous sauropods. More recently, a revision of Ameghino's collection and new discoveries in the Cerro Fortaleza Formation find the taxon to also hail from this formation.

== Description ==
The teeth of Clasmodosaurus spatula were polygonal in cross section rather than round, an unusual trait also found in the titanosaur Bonitasaura salgadoi. However, these teeth are much larger and more robust than those of Bonitasaura, with well-defined longitudinal ridges and grooves, resembling diamantinasaur teeth in some aspects.
