= Malvinas Basin =

Sedimentary basin in the Argentine Shelf

- Cuenca de Malvinas
- Location within Argentina
- Coordinates: 51°30′S 63°30′W
- Etymology: Islas Malvinas
- Location: Argentine Shelf, Southern Atlantic
- Region: Patagonia
- Country: Argentina; United Kingdom
- States: Santa Cruz Province; Falkland Islands

Characteristics
- On/Offshore: Offshore
- Boundaries: Río Chico-Dungeness High (W); Scotia-South American plate boundary (S)
- Part of: Circum-Atlantic basins
- Area: ~180,000 km^{2} (69,000 sq mi)

Hydrology
- Sea: Southern Atlantic Ocean

Geology
- Basin type: Rift basin
- Orogeny: Break-up of Pangea
- Age: Early Jurassic-Holocene
- Stratigraphy: Stratigraphy
- Field: non-commercial

The Malvinas Basin (Spanish: Cuenca de Malvinas) is a major sedimentary basin in the Argentine Shelf offshore southern Patagonia. The basin borders to the west with the Río Chico-Dungeness High that separates it from the Magallanes Basin. The southern boundary is formed by the Scotia plate boundary. Contrary to the neighbouring North Falkland and Magallanes Basins, the Malvinas Basin is not known to have commercial hydrocarbon reserves.

== Tectonic history ==
The Malvinas Basin started to form with the break-up of Pangea since the Early Jurassic.

== Stratigraphy ==
Though poorly understood due to the lack of well data, several formations were identified in the basin on the basis of 2D seismic, of which some also crop out in onshore Patagonia and the Austral Basin:

Age	Formation	Lithologies
Neogene	undefined	Claystones and sandstones
Paleogene	Arenas Glauconíticas & Magallaniano Formations	Sandstones and claystones
Late Cretaceous	Margas Verdes & Arroyo Alfa Formations	Claystones and sandstones
Early Cretaceous	Springhill & Pampa Rincón Formations	Claystones and sandstones
Late Jurassic	Springhill & Pampa Rincón Formations	Claystones and sandstones
Middle Jurassic	Tobífera Formation	Volcanics and claystones
Early Jurassic	Hiatus	
Paleozoic	Basement	Quartzites and shales

== See also ==
- List of fossiliferous stratigraphic units in the Falkland Islands
- Geology of the Falkland Islands
- Golfo San Jorge Basin
- Antarctic Peninsula
