= Rocas Verdes ophiolites =

Location of selected outcrops of the Sarmiento and Tortuga complexes.

The Rocas Verdes ophiolites (Spanish: Complejo Ofiolítico de Rocas Verdes) are a series of greenschists and other rocks constituting ophiolites in Magallanes Region, southernmost Chile. The Rocas Verdes ophiolites represent the continental-oceanic crust that existed in a back-arc basin in the Mesozoic Era as result of extensional tectonics. This back-arc basin then evolved into the Magallanes foreland basin in the Cenozoic Era within the context of the wider Andean orogeny.

The main Rocas Verdes ophiolites are the Sarmiento and Tortuga complexes. Volcanic rocks in both complexes belong to the tholeiitic magma series. While neither represent true oceanic crust Tortugas complex has more geochemical affinity to oceanic crust.
