= Toqui Formation =

Geologic formation in the Aysén Region, Chile

- Stratigraphic range: Tithonian; ~147 Ma
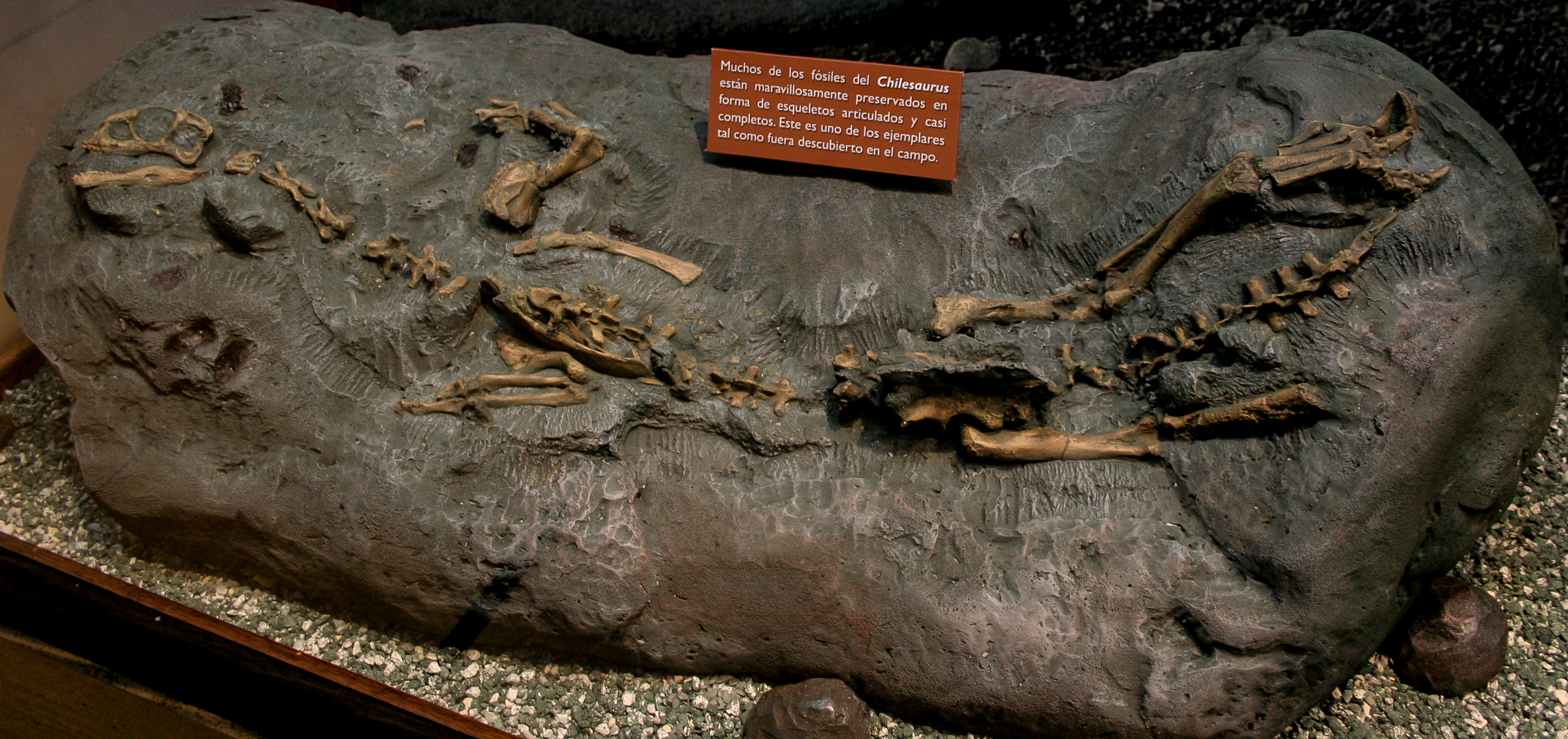
- Cast of Chilesaurus from the Toqui Formation
- Type: Geological formation
- Unit of: Coihaique Group
- Underlies: Katterfeld Formation
- Overlies: Ibáñez Formation
- Thickness: 300–320 m (980–1,050 ft)

Lithology
- Primary: Conglomerate, sandstone, tuffite, ignimbrite

Location
- Coordinates: 46.6°S 72.4°W
- Approximate paleocoordinates: 44.8°S 32.4°W
- Region: Aysén Region
- Country: Chile
- Toqui Formation (Chile)

The Toqui Formation is a geological formation in the Aysén Region of southern Chile. It has been dated to the Tithonian stage of the Late Jurassic by uranium–lead dating of zircons, providing ages between 148.7 ± 1.4 Ma and 147 ± 1.0 Ma. It consists of a sequence of clastic sedimentary sandstones and conglomerates, interbedded with volcanic tuffs and ignimbrite. The dinosaurs Chilesaurus and indeterminate diplodocids and the mesoeucrocodylian Burkesuchus are known from the formation. The formation was deposited in a fluvio-deltaic environment.

== Paleobiota of the Toqui Formation ==
=== Crocodylomorphs ===
Genus	Species	Material	Notes	Images
Burkesuchus	B. mallingrandensis	"Fragmented skull and partial postcrania."	A neosuchian.	
Crocodylomorpha indet.	Indeterminate	"Partial postcrania."	A neosuchian.	

=== Dinosaurs ===
Genus	Species	Material	Notes	Images
Chilesaurus	C. diegosuarezi	"Skull with and skeletons from multiple specimens."	A dinosaur with uncertain affinities.	
Diplodocidae indet.	Indeterminate	"Cervical centra."	A diplodocid.	
Diplodocinae indet.	Indeterminate	"Partial caudal vertebra."	A diplodocin.	
Sauropoda indet.	Indeterminate	"Partial dorsal vertebra."	A sauropod.	
Sauropoda indet.	Indeterminate	"Two caudal vertebrae centra."	A sauropod.	
Sauropoda indet.	Indeterminate	"Partial sternal plate."	A sauropod.	
Titanosauriformes? indet.	Indeterminate	"Lower end of left femur."	A titanosauriform.	
Titanosauriformes? indet.	Indeterminate	"Lower end of right tibia."	A titanosauriform.	

== See also ==
- Geology of Chile
- Tobífera Formation
