= Ayacara Formation =

Geologic formation in Chile

- Stratigraphic range: Early–Middle Miocene; ~21.8–17.6 Ma
- Type: Geological formation
- Thickness: at least 800 m (2,600 ft)

Lithology
- Primary: Sandstone, siltstone, conglomerate

Location
- Coordinates: 42.313205°S 72.651125°W
- Region: Los Lagos Region
- Country: Chile

Type section
- Named by: Levi et al., 1966
- Ayacara Formation (Chile)

The Ayacara Formation is a sedimentary formation made up of interbedded sand and siltstone cropping out around Hornopirén and Ayacara Peninsula in western Los Lagos Region, Chile. Less common rocks are tuff and conglomerate. The formation dates to the Early and Middle Miocene (no earlier than 21.8–17.6 million years ago) when it deposited during a marine transgression.

== See also ==
- Geology of Chile
- Chaicayán Group
- La Cascada Formation
- Puduhuapi Formation
- Vargas Formation
