= Cerro Colorado Formation =

Geologic formation in Chile

- Stratigraphic range: Early Cretaceous
- Type: Geologic group
- Underlies: Flamencos Tuffs
- Thickness: >100 m (330 ft)

Location
- Region: Aysén Region
- Country: Chile
- Extent: Aysén Basin

The Cerro Colorado Formation is a geological formation to the south of General Carrera Lake in Patagonia. Sedimentary rocks of the Cerro Colorado Formation deposited under shallow marine conditions.

== See also ==
- Geology of Aysén Region
- Cretaceous South America
