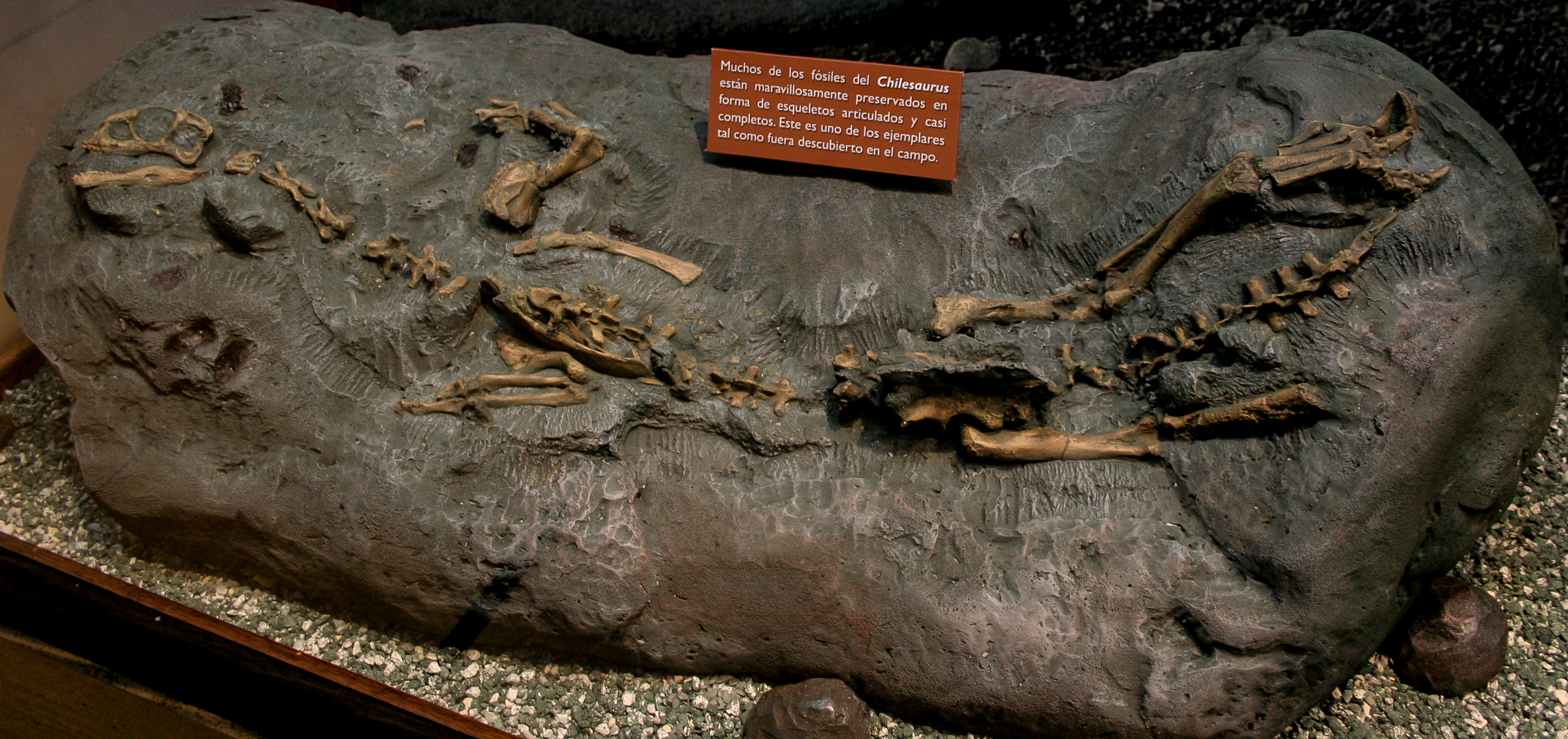
- Cast of the holotype skeleton

Scientific classification
- Kingdom: Animalia
- Phylum: Chordata
- Class: Reptilia
- Clade: Dinosauria
- Clade: Saurischia
- Clade: Theropoda (?)
- Genus: †Chilesaurus; Novas et al. 2015
- Species: †C. diegosuarezi

Binomial name
- †Chilesaurus diegosuarezi Novas et al. 2015

= Chilesaurus =

Chilesaurus Temporal range: Late Jurassic (Tithonian) ~147 Ma

Extinct genus of dinosaur

Chilesaurus is an extinct genus of herbivorous dinosaur. While its exact classification is uncertain, many researchers believe it is a theropod, with a minority of academics suggesting that it may be an ornithischian. The type and only known species so far is Chilesaurus diegosuarezi. Chilesaurus lived between 148-147 million years ago (Mya) in the Late Jurassic period of Chile. Showing a combination of traits from theropods, ornithischians, and sauropodomorphs, this genus has far-reaching implications for the evolution of dinosaurs, such as whether the traditional saurischian-ornithischian split is superior or inferior to the proposed group Ornithoscelida. This however, has been contested by several other authors, who believe that the weight of evidence supports its membership within Theropoda, and possibly as a member of Tetanurae.

== Discovery and naming ==
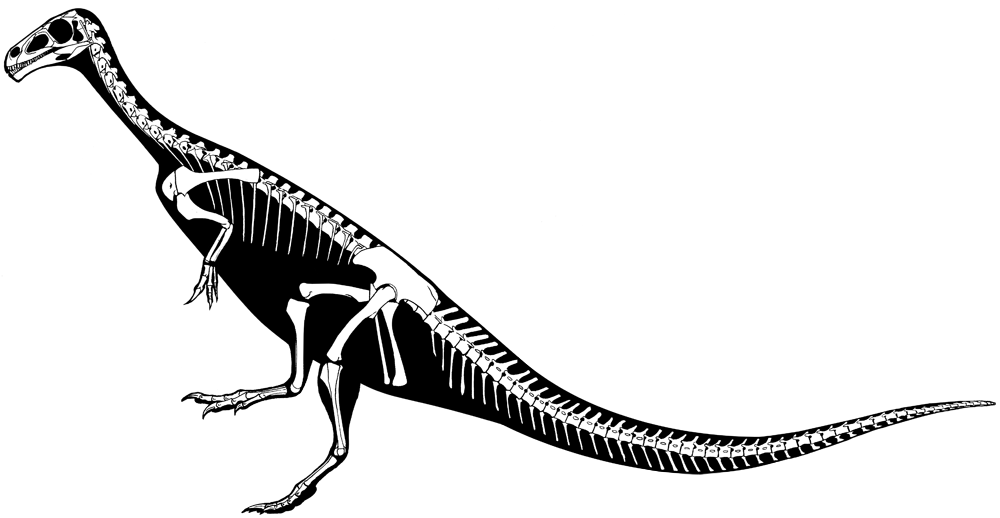
Reconstructed skeleton of Chilesaurus

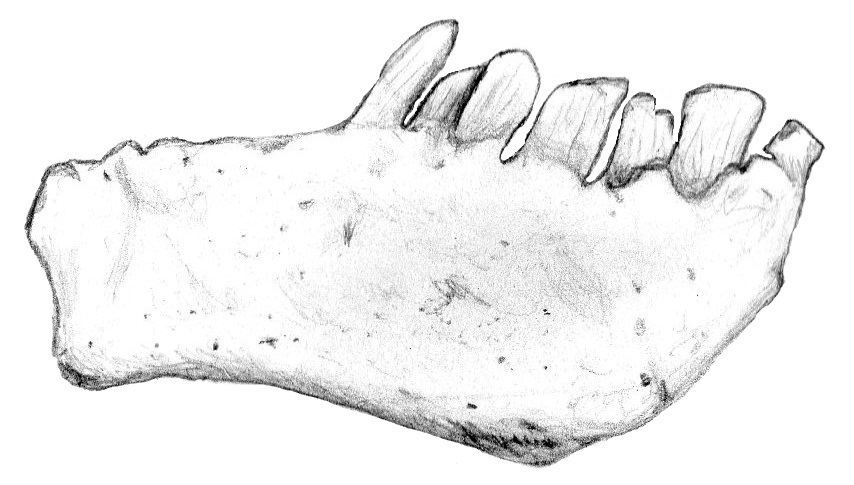
Illustration of the lower jaw

Chilesaurus was first discovered on 4 February 2004 by a seven-year-old named Diego Suárez. He and his parents, the geologists Manuel Suárez and Rita de la Cruz, were searching for decorative stones in the Aysén Region, and uncovered a vertebra and rib from what would later be named Chilesaurus. More specimens were found that were assigned to various dinosaur species in 2008 but were later recognized as belonging to additional individuals of Chilesaurus. One reason this realization took time was that Chilesaurus has such a bizarre combination of traits, coupled with the fact that the remains were discovered alongside a few bones from an unrelated diplodocid sauropod.

In 2015, the type species C. diegosuarezi was named and described by Fernando Emilio Novas, Leonardo Salgado, Manuel Suárez, Federico Lisandro Agnolín, Martín Dario Ezcurra, Nicolás Chimento, Rita de la Cruz, Marcelo Pablo Isasi, Alexander Omar Vargas, and David Rubilar-Rogers. The generic name is derived from Chile (the country where it was discovered) and the latinized Greek suffix "saurus", meaning "lizard". The specific name honors Diego Suárez.

The holotype, SNGM-1935, was found in a layer of the Toqui Formation dating from the late Tithonian. It consists of an articulated, rather complete skeleton with skull of a juvenile individual, lacking the feet and most of the tail. Four other partial skeletons (specimens SNGM-1937, SNGM-1936, SNGM-1938, and SNGM-1888) and several single bones (specimens SNGM-1889, SNGM-1895, SNGM-1901, SNGM-1894, SNGM-1898, SNGM-1900, and SNGM-1903) are the paratypes. They represent juvenile and adult individuals.

== Description ==
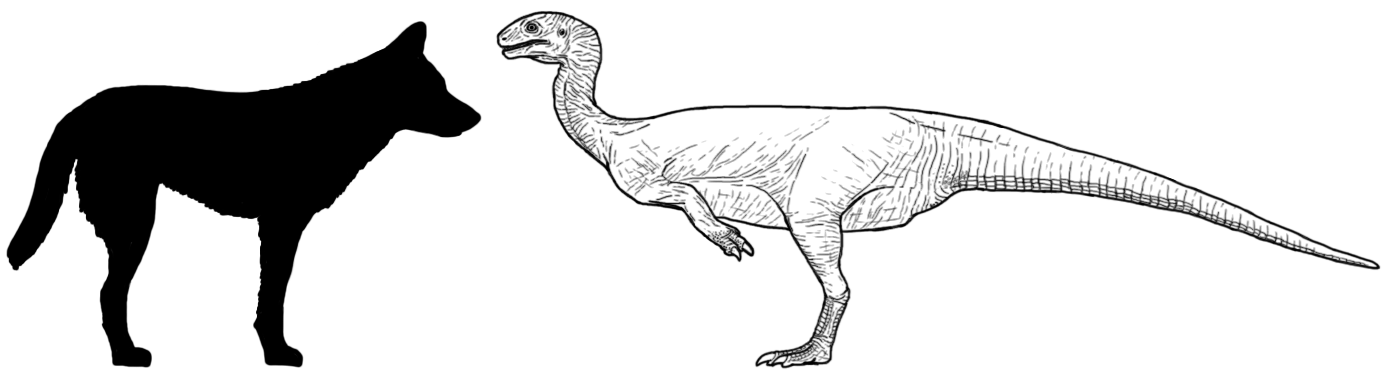
Life restoration of Chilesaurus, size based on holotype individual

The holotype of Chilesaurus is relatively complete. It includes a partially complete skull and mandible, a complete series of neck and back vertebrae, most of the ribcage, a complete arm and leg, most of the hips, shoulders, and a few of the front-most tail vertebrae. However, the lack of a complete tail makes a full estimation of its size imprecise. The holotype itself, which represents a skeletally immature individual, is estimated to have been about 1.6 m (5.2 ft) long in life. There are several paratypes representing at least four individuals at varying stages of ontogenetic maturity. The largest of these, believed to be an adult, was used to infer that the full length of an adult Chilesaurus would have been about 3.2 m (10.5 ft).

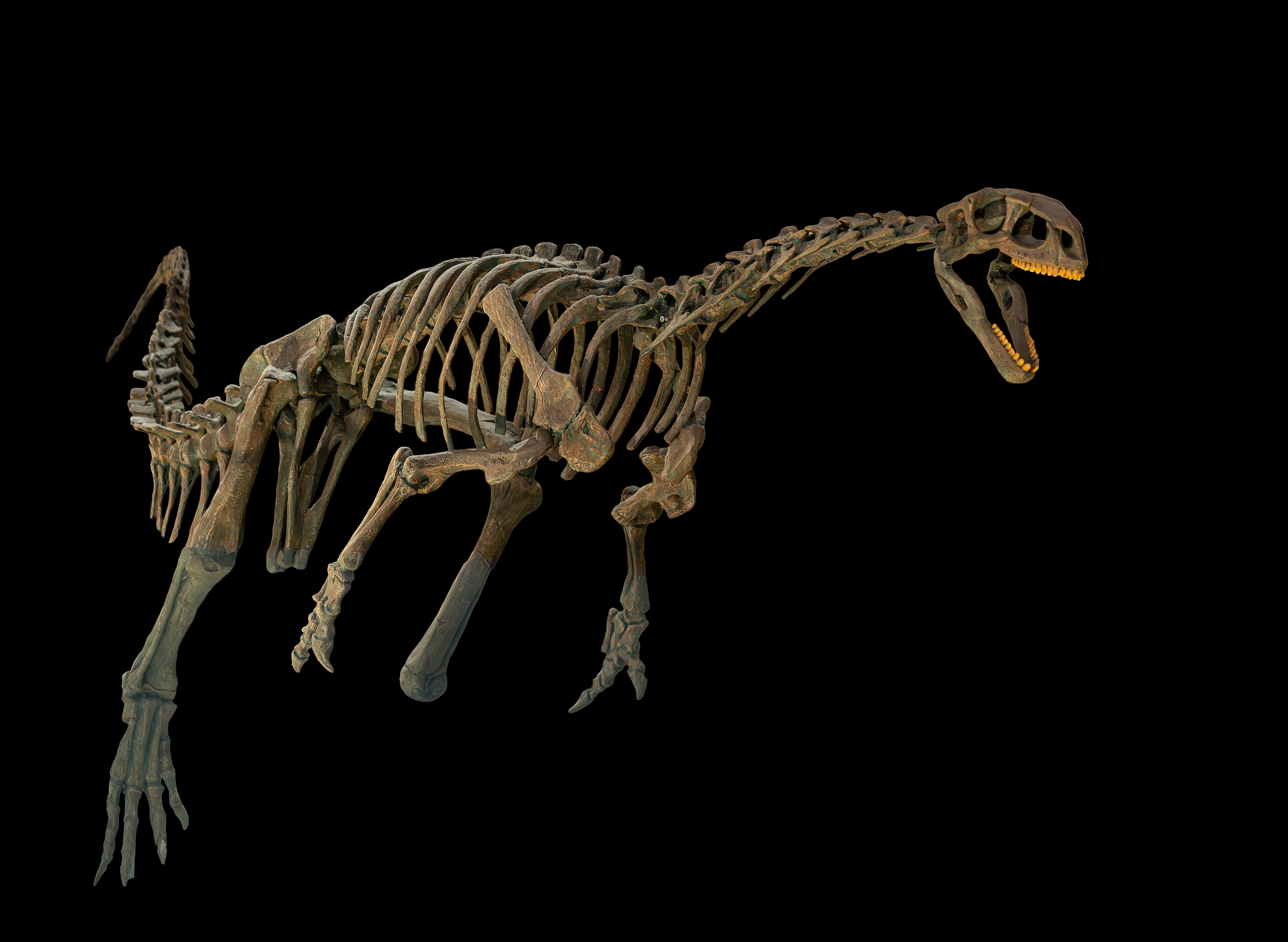
Reconstructed skeleton, Museo Nacional de Historia Natural de Chile

Chilesaurus can be distinguished from all other dinosaurs by a combination of unique features. It has a very short premaxillary bone, a uniquely quadrilaterally-shaped coracoid bone with thickened outer edges, a hand with only two clawed fingers (the third finger being highly reduced) with very shortened phalanges, and several features of the hip and ankle bones that are distinct from all other theropods. However, one of the most distinctive unusual features of Chilesaurus is its spatula-shaped, elongated teeth, which protrude forwards out of their sockets. Such dentition would be unique among theropods, and is typical for a herbivore, indicating Chilesaurus was a plant-eater. If Chilesaurus was a theropod, it would be only one of a handful of non-coelurosaurian theropods to evolve herbivory, alongside Limusaurus, Berthasaura, and possibly others. Another apparent adaptation for herbivory is the backward-pointing pubic bone in the pelvis, which has been interpreted as an adaptation for developing the more complex digestive apparatus necessary to digest plants. Such a pelvic arrangement is typical for ornithischians, which has led some authors to suggest that Chilesaurus may be a member of that group.

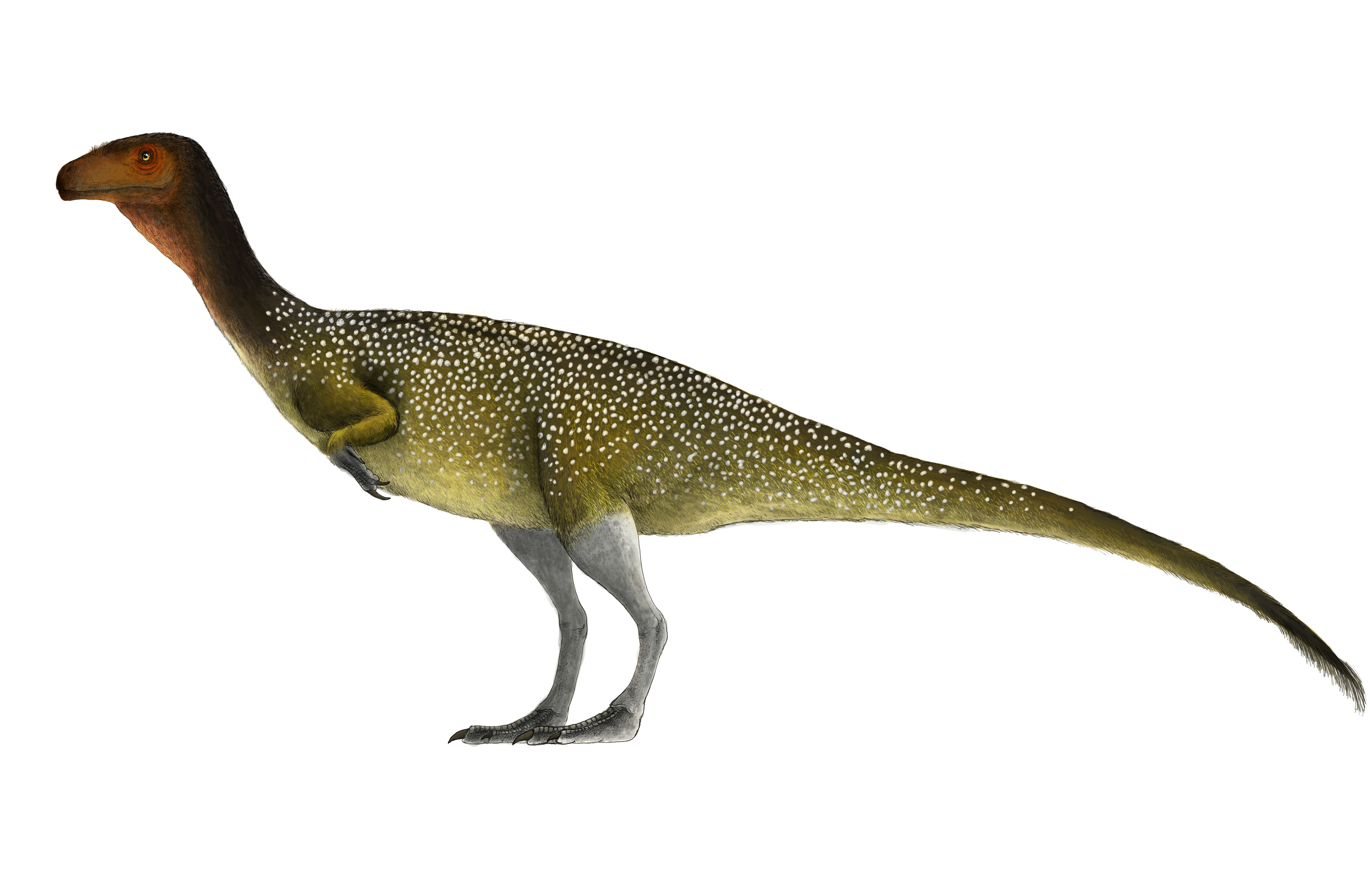
Life restoration of Chilesaurus with speculative feathers

The hind limb of Chilesaurus is less adapted for running than many other groups of dinosaurs. This is inferred from the presence of a small cnemial crest on the front top of the shinbone, and a broad foot with a weight-bearing first toe. These adaptations would have made running for long periods of time much less efficient, and they are generally not present in animals which are known to have been proficcient runners. However, it is possible that Chilesaurus could defend itself using relatively strong arms which bore a large claw on the first finger.

== Classification ==
In its original description, Chilesaurus was found to be a very basally-branching member of the theropod clade Tetanurae. An abbreviated version of the cladogram produced by the authors of that paper is shown below.

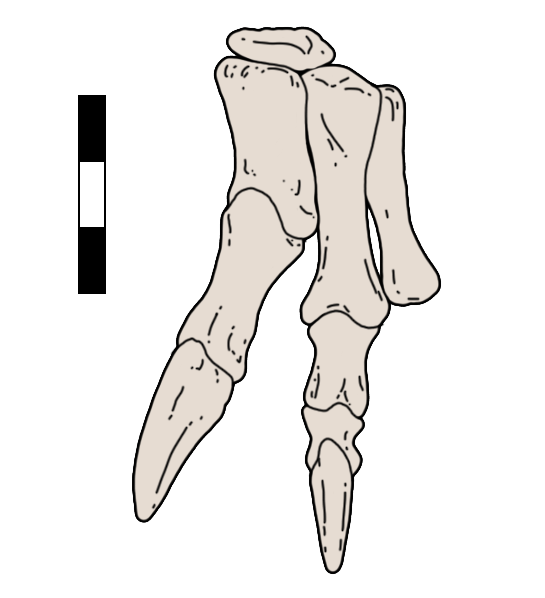
Reconstructed right manus

- Theropoda
  - Herrerasauridae
  - Neotheropoda
    - Coelophysoidea
    - Averostra
      - Ceratosauria
      - Tetanurae
        - Chilesaurus
        - - Megalosauroidea
          - - Allosauroidea
            - Coelurosauria

In 2017, Baron and Barrett proposed that Chilesaurus may instead be a basal ornithischian. The publication in which this was proposed also resurrected the previously-discredited "Ornithoscelida hypothesis", which suggested that theropods shared a more recent common ancestor with ornithischians than with sauropodomorphs. Less than a year later in 2018, Müller and colleagues published a reply to Baron & Barrett (2017), arguing that their phylogenetic dataset actually suggested that Chilesaurus was a basal sauropodomorph rather than an ornithischian. Baron and Barrett reached out to the other team of authors to inform them that they had accidentally published a faulty early version of their dataset with many traits scored incorrectly, and that their original results were based on an edited final dataset. They corrected their original publication and supplied the final dataset to Müller and colleagues, who agreed that it supported the placement of Chilesaurus in Ornithischia as had been originally argued by Baron and Barrett in 2017. However, Müller and colleagues also noted that Baron and Barrett did not test the original proposal of Chilesaurus as a theropod, and that its classification remained uncertain. Below is a cladogram illustrating the classification proposed by Baron & Barrett (2017), which places Chilesaurus as the most basal ornithischian.

- Dinosauria
  - Saurischia
    - Herrerasauridae
    - Sauropodomorpha
  - Ornithoscelida
    - Theropoda
    - Ornithischia
      - Chilesaurus
      - - Pisanosaurus
        - - Neornithischia
          - Thyreophora

In a latter re-revision of his own datasets, Baron concluded that Chilesaurus remains enigmatic and could be either a theropod or an ornithischian, while noting that its affinities as a theropod were more generally supported by other authors. In his major work on theropod classification in 2024, Andrea Cau recovered Chilesaurus as a sister taxon of Tetanurae. Fonseca and colleagues conducted a similar work on the classification of ornithischians, which also recovered Chilesaurus as a theropod.

A full osteological description of Chilesaurus was published as part of the PhD thesis of Nicolás Roberto Chimento Ortiz in 2018. In it, he noted the likely theropod affinities of the taxon, highlighting elements such as the structure of the metatarsals, characteristics of the tibia, and the opisthopubic pelvis.
