= Cerro Fortaleza Formation =

Geological formation in Argentina

- Stratigraphic range: Campanian to Maastrichtian; ~76–70 Ma
- Type: Geological formation
- Underlies: La Irene Formation
- Overlies: Anita Formation
- Thickness: 460 m (1,510 ft)

Lithology
- Primary: Sandstone

Location
- Coordinates: 49.9°S 72.1°W
- Approximate paleocoordinates: 51.9°S 61.8°W
- Region: Santa Cruz Province, southern Patagonia
- Country: Argentina
- Extent: Austral Basin
- Cerro Fortaleza Formation (Argentina)

The Cerro Fortaleza Formation, in older literature described as Pari Aike Formation, is a Late Cretaceous geologic formation of Campanian to Maastrichtian age (although it has formerly been reported to be Cenomanian to Santonian) of the Austral Basin in southern Patagonia, Argentina.

== Description ==
The sandstones of the formation were deposited in a fluvial environment. The formation has an estimated thickness of 460 metres (1,510 ft) and overlies the Anita Formation, while it is overlain by the La Irene Formation. These formations are considered Campanian and Maastrichtian in age, respectively, making the Cerro Fortaleza Formation aged between them.

== Paleobiota ==
The giant titanosaurs Puertasaurus and Dreadnoughtus, the megaraptoran Orkoraptor, the berthasaurid Austrocheirus isasii, and the ornithopod Talenkauen have been recovered from the formation alongside turtles and crocodiles.

=== Dinosaurs ===
Color key: Taxon / Reclassified taxon / Taxon falsely reported as present / Dubious taxon or junior synonym / Ichnotaxon / Ootaxon / Morphotaxon	Notes; Uncertain or tentative taxa are in small text; ~~crossed out~~ taxa are discredited.

==== Ornithischians ====
Ornithischians of the Cerro Fortaleza Formation
Taxa	Species	Locality	Stratigraphic unit	Material	Notes	Images
Ankylosauria indet.	Indeterminate			Small isolated osteoderms		
Iguanodontoidea indet.	Indeterminate				One incomplete maxillary tooth crown	
Ornithopoda indet.	Indeterminate			Two isolated caudal centra		
Talenkauen	T. santacrucensis	Corro Los Hornos near Lake Viedma.	Upper	A partial articulated skeleton missing the rear part of the skull, the tail, and the hands	An elasmarian ornithopod	

==== Sauropods ====
Sauropods of the Cerro Fortaleza Formation
Taxa	Species	Locality	Stratigraphic unit	Material	Notes	Images
Clasmodosaurus	C. spatula	Lago Viedma		Two incomplete teeth	A titanosaur	
Clasmodosaurus	Indeterminate			32 isolated teeth	A titanosaur	
Dreadnoughtus	D. schrani	Rio La Leona Valley	Upper	Four incomplete proximal caudals and an incomplete left astragalus	A titanosaur	
Puertasaurus	P. reuili	Cerros Los Hornos, La Leona	Upper	A partial skeleton, including four disarticulated vertebrae (one cervical, one dorsal, and two caudal vertebrae)	A titanosaur	

==== Theropods ====
Theropods of the Cerro Fortaleza Formation
Taxa	Species	Locality	Stratigraphic unit	Material	Notes	Images
Abelisauridae indet.	Indeterminate			An incomplete ziphodont tooth		
Austrocheirus	A. isasii	Hoyada Arroyo Seco	Upper	An incomplete right ulna	A ceratosaurian theropod	
Orkoraptor	O. burkei	Cerro Los Hornos	Upper	Several isolated teeth, including two anteriormost, probably premaxillary teeth, left manual phalanx I-1, right, nearly complete fibula, and right ungual.	A megaraptoran	

=== Fish ===
Fish of the Cerro Fortaleza Formation
Taxa	Species	Locality	Stratigraphic unit	Material	Notes	Images
Atlantoceratodus	A. iheringi	Cerro Los Hornos and Hoyada Arroyo Seco.		Four lower tooth plates, one lower tooth plate attached to a partial mandibular bone and four upper tooth plates	A lungfish	

== See also ==
- List of dinosaur-bearing rock formations
