= Divisadero Group =

South American geological formation group

- Stratigraphic range: Aptian–Albian
- Type: Geologic group
- Underlies: Cerro Plataforma, La Cascada, Ligorio Márques & Cardiel Formations
- Overlies: Coihaique Group

Lithology
- Primary: Pyroclastic rock, lava

Location
- Location: Patagonia
- Coordinates: 45°30′S 72°00′W
- Region: Chubut Province; Aysén Region
- Country: Argentina, Chile
- Extent: Magallanes or Austral Basin

Type section
- Named by: Heim
- Year defined: 1940
- Divisadero Group (Argentina)

The Divisadero Group is a group of geological formations in the Magallanes Basin (Chile) or Austral Basin (Argentina) of northwestern Patagonia. It overlies the Coihaique Group. The group is chiefly made up of pyroclastic rocks and lavas of the calc-alkaline magma series. Rocks are of andesite and rhyolite composition.

== Geographic extent ==
In Chile, the formation crops out in Aysén Region while in Argentina it can be found in Chubut Province.

Tectonic movements during the Miocene have significantly deformed Divisadero Group.

== See also ==
- Geology of Aysén Region
- Cretaceous South America
