= Magallanes Basin =

Sedimentary basin in Patagonia, South America

Magallanes or Austral Basin
- Cuenca de Magallanes, Cuenca Austral
- Location within Chile
- Coordinates: 53°00′S 69°30′W
- Etymology: Strait of Magellan; Austral = "south"
- Location: Southern South America
- Region: Patagonia
- Country: Argentina; Chile
- States: Santa Cruz Province; Aysén & Magallanes Regions
- Cities: Punta Arenas; Ushuaia

Characteristics
- On/Offshore: Both
- Boundaries: Andes, Río Chico-Dungeness High
- Part of: Andean foreland basins
- Area: 170,000–200,000 km^{2} (66,000–77,000 sq mi)

Hydrology
- Sea: Southern Atlantic Ocean
- River: Shehuén River
- Lakes: Viedma, Cardiel, Argentino, Pueyrredón, Fontana

Geology
- Basin type: Foreland basin
- Orogeny: Andean
- Age: Jurassic-Holocene
- Stratigraphy: Stratigraphy
- Field: Chilean coal

The Magallanes Basin (Note: Chiefly used in Chile) or Austral Basin (Note: Mainly used in Argentina) is a major sedimentary basin in southern Patagonia. The basin covers a surface of about 170,000 to 200,000 square kilometres (66,000 to 77,000 sq mi) and has a NNW-SSE oriented shape. The basin is bounded to the west by the Andes mountains and is separated from the Malvinas Basin to the east by the Río Chico-Dungeness High. The basin evolved from being an extensional back-arc basin in the Mesozoic to being a compressional foreland basin in the Cenozoic. Rocks within the basin are Jurassic in age and include the Cerro Toro Formation. Three ages of the SALMA classification are defined in the basin; the Early Miocene Santacrucian from the Santa Cruz Formation and Friasian from the Río Frías Formation and the Pleistocene Ensenadan from the La Ensenada Formation.

The Magallanes Basin contains most of Chile's coal reserves dwarfing those found in the Arauco Basin or around Valdivia (e.g. Catamutún, Mulpún). Its coals are lignitic to sub-bituminous.

== Stratigraphy ==
=== Aysén Basin ===
The northwesternmost reaches of the basin form a sub-basin known as Aysén Basin or Río Mayo Embayment. From top to bottom the fill the basin is:

- Río Frías Formation (Friasian)
- Río Baguales Formation (Deseadan)
- Late Cretaceous volcanic rock
- Divisadero Group (Aptian to Albian)
- Coihaique Group (Late Jurassic to Aptian)
  - Apeleg Formation
  - Katterfeld Formation
  - Toqui Formation (Tithonian)
- Ibáñez Formation

=== Northwestern basin ===
In the Argentinian parts of the basin, the following formations have been registered from north to south:

- Santa Cruz Formation (Santacrucian)
- Cerro Boleadoras Formation (Santacrucian)
- Río Jeinemeni Formation (Colhuehuapian)
- Monte León Formation (Deseadan to Colhuehuapian)
- San Julián Formation (Late Eocene to Early Miocene)
- Campo Bola Formation
- Asunción Formation
- Cardiel Formation (Maastrichtian)
- Mata Amarilla Formation (Albian to Santonian)
- Piedra Clavada Formation (Albian)
- Kachaike Formation (Aptian to Cenomanian)
- Río Tarde Formation
- Apeleg Formation
- Cerro Toro Formation (Turonian)
- Divisadero Group (Aptian to Albian)
- Río Belgrano Formation (Barremian to Aptian)
- Springhill Formation (Valanginian to Hauterivian)
- El Tranquilo Group (Late Triassic)
  - Laguna Colorada Formation (Norian)

=== South-central basin ===
- La Ensenada Formation (Ensenadan)
- Cordillera Chica Formation
- Pinturas Formation (Santacrucian)
- Santa Cruz Formation (Santacrucian)
- Centinela Formation (Middle Eocene)
- Río Leona Formation
- Río Guillero Formation
- Man Aike Formation (Middle Eocene)
- Río Turbio Formation (Early to Late Eocene)
- Calafate Formation
- Cerro Dorotea Formation
- Chorrillo Formation (Maastrichtian)
- La Irene Formation (Maastrichtian)
- Monte Chico Formation (Maastrichtian)
- Cerro Fortaleza Formation (Cenomanian)
- Anita Formation
- Cerro Cazador Formation (Campanian to Maastrichtian)
- Alta Vista Formation (Early to Middle Campanian)
- Lago Sofía Formation
- Cerro Toro Formation (Turonian to Santonian)
- Río Mayer Formation (early Hauterivian to early Albian)
- Zapata Formation (Berriasian to Hauterivian)
- Springhill Formation (Berriasian to Barremian)
- Tobífera Formation (Late Jurassic)

=== Tierra del Fuego ===
- Irigoyen Formation
- Punta Basílica Formation
- Castillo Formation
- Loreto Formation (Priabonian - Divisaderan to Tinguirirican)
- Cabo Peña Formation
- Tchat Chii Formation
- Cerro Colorado Formation
- Leticia Formation (Bartonian)
- Punta Torcida Formation
- Arroyo Candelaria Formation
- Río Claro Formation
- Policarpo Formation
- Bahía Thetis Formation
- Cabeza de León Formation
- Arroyo Alfa Formation
- Yahgan Formation
- Beauvoir Formation (Albian)
- Nueva Argentina Formation
- Lemaire Formation
- Pampa Rincón Formation (Barremian to Aptian)
- Chon Aike Formation (Middle Jurassic to Berriasian)

== See also ==
- Cerro Benitez
- Turbio River (Patagonia)
- Golfo San Jorge Basin
- Rocas Verdes ophiolites
