= Loncosaurus =

Loncosaurus Temporal range: Late Cretaceous, 76–66 Ma

Scientific classification
- Domain: Eukaryota
- Kingdom: Animalia
- Phylum: Chordata
- Clade: Dinosauria
- Clade: †Ornithischia
- Clade: †Ornithopoda
- Genus: †Loncosaurus; Ameghino, 1899
- Species: †L. argentinus

Binomial name
- †Loncosaurus argentinus Ameghino, 1899

Synonyms
- Loncasaurus Ameghino, 1899; Longosaurus Roth, 1900; Megalosaurus argentinus (Ameghino, 1899) Friedrich von Huene, 1929

Extinct genus of dinosaurs

Loncosaurus (meaning uncertain; either Araucanian "chief" or Greek "lance" "lizard") is an extinct genus of ornithopod dinosaur from the Upper Cretaceous of Provincia de Santa Cruz, Argentina. The type (and only known) species is Loncosaurus argentinus, described by the famous Argentinian paleontologist Florentino Ameghino, but is considered a dubious name. Details on this animal are often contradictory, befitting a genus that was long confused for a theropod.

Teeth attributed to cf. "Carnosaurus" may have actually belonged to Loncosaurus.

== History ==
The holotype femur and tooth were discovered by Carlos Ameghino, Florentino's brother, between 1887 and 1898.

Ameghino named this dinosaur in 1899 from a proximal femur (MACN-1629) and tooth found near Rio Sehuen, Santa Cruz, in the Cardiel Formation (Upper Cretaceous).

Either way, he thought the remains belonged to a "megalosaurid" dinosaur, a carnivore, which Friedrich von Huene agreed with. Upon further review, von Zittel assigned it to the Coeluridae, recognized today as a "wastebasket taxon" for small carnivorous dinosaurs. The carnivore tooth helped this misidentification take hold.

It was ignored for decades until Ralph Molnar reassessed it. He found that the tooth did not belong to the same animal as the femur and removed it from the type, and suggested that the femur belonged to a hypsilophodont or turtle. Professional opinion has not changed much since then, although based on size, it appears more likely to be an iguanodont than a hypsilophodont. Reviews either put it at Ornithopoda incertae sedis or Iguanodontia. Oddly, a semipopular reference reassigned it to Genyodectes without comment, a view which has not been followed since.

== Paleobiology ==
Coria estimates the size of the Loncosaurus type individual at about 5 m (16.4 feet) long. As a small to medium-sized ornithopod, it would have been an agile bipedal herbivore.
