= North Patagonian Batholith =

Igneous plutons in Argentina & Chile

The North Patagonian Batholith (Spanish: Batolito Nor-Patagónico) is a series of igneous plutons in the Patagonian Andes of Argentina and Chile.

== Geology ==
The Northern Patagonian Batholith was formed in the Mesozoic Era and Cenozoic Era. It is made up of a collection of individual plutons made up of granodiorite, tonalite and diorite among other rocks.

Most plutons of the North Patagonian Batholith are of Cretaceous Period to the Miocene age of the Neogene Period (135 Ma to 25-15 Ma), during the Mesozoic Era. Late Miocene to early Pliocene (10 to 5 Ma) leucogranites were also intruded. The Tertiary intrusions are centered on the strike-slip Liquine-Ofqui fault zone and include some gabbro bodies.

== See also ==
- Oligocene South America
