= Tobífera Formation =

Geological Formation

- Stratigraphic range: Mid-Late Jurassic
- Type: Geological formation
- Sub-units: Basal Clastic Complex
- Underlies: Zapata, Springhill, Pampa Rincón & Chon Aike Formations
- Overlies: Tierra del Fuego Igneous and Metamorphic Complex; Cordillera Darwin Metamorphic Complex

Lithology
- Primary: Silicic pyroclastic rocks (including tuff)
- Other: Black shale, silicic intrusions, conglomerate, sandstone

Location
- Coordinates: 52.0°S 73.2°W
- Region: Santa Cruz Province; Magallanes y la Antártica Chilena Region
- Country: Argentina, Chile
- Extent: Rocas Verdes Basin; Magallanes & Malvinas Basins

Type section
- Named for: Spanish for "tuffaceous"
- Tobífera Formation (Chile)

Tobífera Formation (Spanish: Formación Tobífera) is a volcano-sedimentary formation of Middle to Late Jurassic age. The formation is crops out in the Magallanes Region in southern Patagonia and Tierra del Fuego of Chile, the Santa Cruz Province of southern Argentina, and in the subsurface of the Malvinas Basin offshore Argentina and the Falkland Islands.

== Description ==
The bulk of the formation originates from silicic pyroclastic material during a period of bimodal volcanism in Rocas Verdes Basin, a rift basin. The Tobífera Formation is grouped together with other formations of similar age in Patagonia in the Chon Aike Province an extraordinarily large province of silicic volcanism.

Except for some western and southern exposures most of the formation is buried and known only from boreholes in the Magallanes and Malvinas Basins. The formation is equivalent to El Quemado and Ibañez Formations. Tobífera Formation has an up to 80 metres (260 ft) thick Basal Clastic Complex, a sub-unit made up of conglomerate and sandstone. Tobífera Formation unconformably overlies metamorphic and igneous basement complexes of Cambrian age.

== Deformation and metamorphism ==
Much of the formation is folded and faulted as consequence of the Andean orogeny. At Última Esperanza Province the formation metamorphosed first under greenschist facies and then under prehnite-pumpellyite facies conditions. Some rhyolites of Tobífera Formation were incorporated into Cordillera Darwin Metamorphic Complex. The incorporation of part of Tobífera Formation in the metamorphic complex was accompanied by deformation and metamorphism and occurred in the context of the Andean orogeny in the Cretaceous.
