= Complex (geology) =

In geology, a complex is a lithodemic unit consisting of two or more lithodemes of more than one genetic class (metamorphic, igneous or sedimentary).

The law of superposition is inapplicable to intrusive, highly deformed, or metamorphic bodies of rock lacking discernible stratification. Such bodies of rock are described as lithodemic and are determined and delimited based on rock characteristics. The 1983 North American Stratigraphic Code adopted the formal term lithodeme, which is comparable to a formation. A lithodeme is the fundamental unit and should possess distinctive and consistent lithological features, comprising a single rock type or a mixture of two or more types that distinguishes the unit from those around it. A complex is a group of two or more lithodemes of more than one genetic classes. It differs from a suite, which is a group of two or more lithodemes of the same genetic class.
