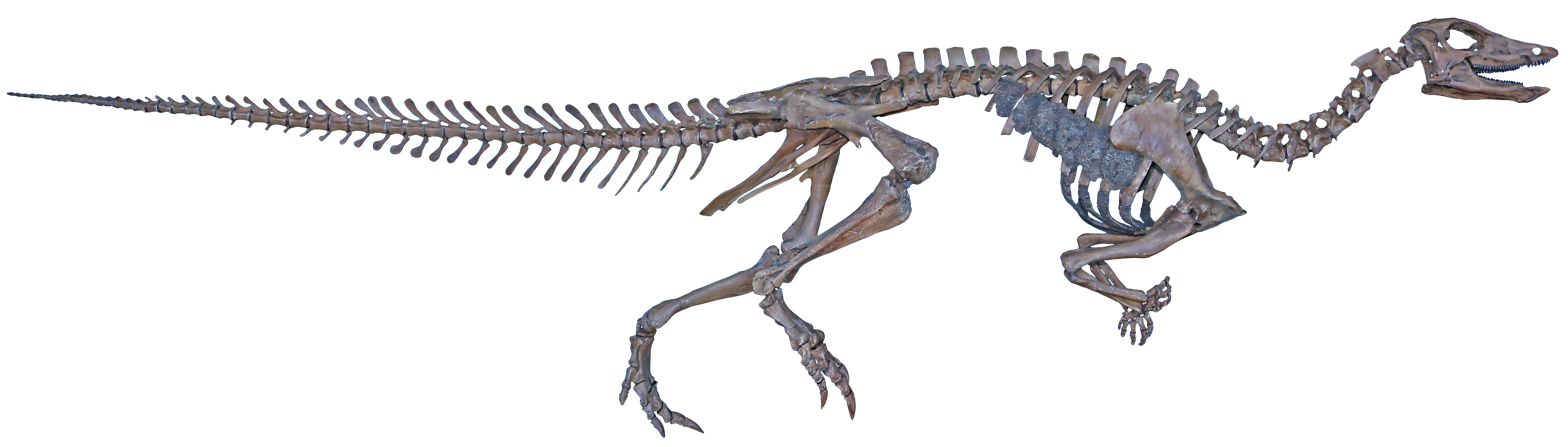
- Reconstructed skeleton

Scientific classification
- Kingdom: Animalia
- Phylum: Chordata
- Class: Reptilia
- Clade: Dinosauria
- Clade: †Ornithischia
- Family: †Thescelosauridae
- Subfamily: †Thescelosaurinae
- Genus: †Thescelosaurus; Gilmore, 1913

Type species
- †Thescelosaurus neglectus Gilmore, 1913

Other species
- †T. edmontonensis Sternberg, 1940 (nomen dubium); †T. garbanii Morris, 1976; †T. infernalis (Galton, 1995) (nomen dubium); †T. assiniboiensis Brown et al., 2011

Synonyms
- Bugenasaura Galton, 1995

= Thescelosaurus =

Thescelosaurus Temporal range: Late Cretaceous (late Maastrichtian), 69.42–66.04 Ma

Ornithischian dinosaur genus from Late Cretaceous US and Canada

Thescelosaurus (/ˌθɛsɪləˈsɔːrəs/ THESS-el-oh-sore-us) is a genus of ornithischian dinosaur that lived during the Late Cretaceous period in western North America. It was named and described in 1913 by the paleontologist Charles W. Gilmore; the type species is T. neglectus. Two other species, T. garbanii and T. assiniboiensis, were named in 1976 and 2011, respectively. Additional species have been suggested but are currently not accepted. Thescelosaurus is the eponymous member of its family, the Thescelosauridae. Thescelosaurids are either considered to be basal ("primitive") ornithopods, or are placed outside of this group within the broader group Neornithischia.

Adult Thescelosaurus would have measured roughly 3–4 m (10–13 ft) long and probably weighed 200 to 300 kg (440 to 660 lb). It moved on two legs, and its body was counter-balanced by its long tail, which made up half of the body length and was stiffened by rod-like ossified tendons. The animal had a long, low snout that ended in a toothless beak. It had more teeth than related genera, and the teeth were of different types. The hand bore five fingers, and the foot four toes. Thin plates are found next to the ribs' sides, the function of which is unclear. Scale impressions are known from the leg of one specimen. An herbivore, Thescelosaurus was likely a selective feeder, as indicated by its teeth and narrow snout. Its limbs were robust, and its femur (thigh bone) was longer than its tibia (shin bone), suggesting that it was not adapted to running. Its brain was comparatively small, possibly indicating small group sizes of two to three individuals. The senses of smell and balance were acute, but hearing was poor. It might have been burrowing, as acute smell and poor hearing are typical for modern burrowing animals. Burrowing has been confirmed for the closely related Oryctodromeus, and might have been widespread in thescelosaurids. The genus attracted media attention in 2000, when a specimen unearthed in 1999 was interpreted as including a fossilized heart, but scientists now doubt the identification of the object.

Thescelosaurus has been found across a wide geographic range across western North America. The first specimens were discovered in the Lance Formation of Wyoming, but subsequent discoveries have been made in North Dakota, South Dakota, Montana, Alberta, and Saskatchewan, in geological formations including the Frenchman Formation, Hell Creek Formation, and Scollard Formation. It was relatively common, and may have been the most common dinosaur in the Frenchman Formation. Living during the late Maastrichtian age, it was among the last of the non-avian dinosaurs before the entire group went extinct during the Cretaceous–Paleogene extinction event around 66 million years ago.

== Discovery and history ==
=== T. neglectus and its type specimen ===
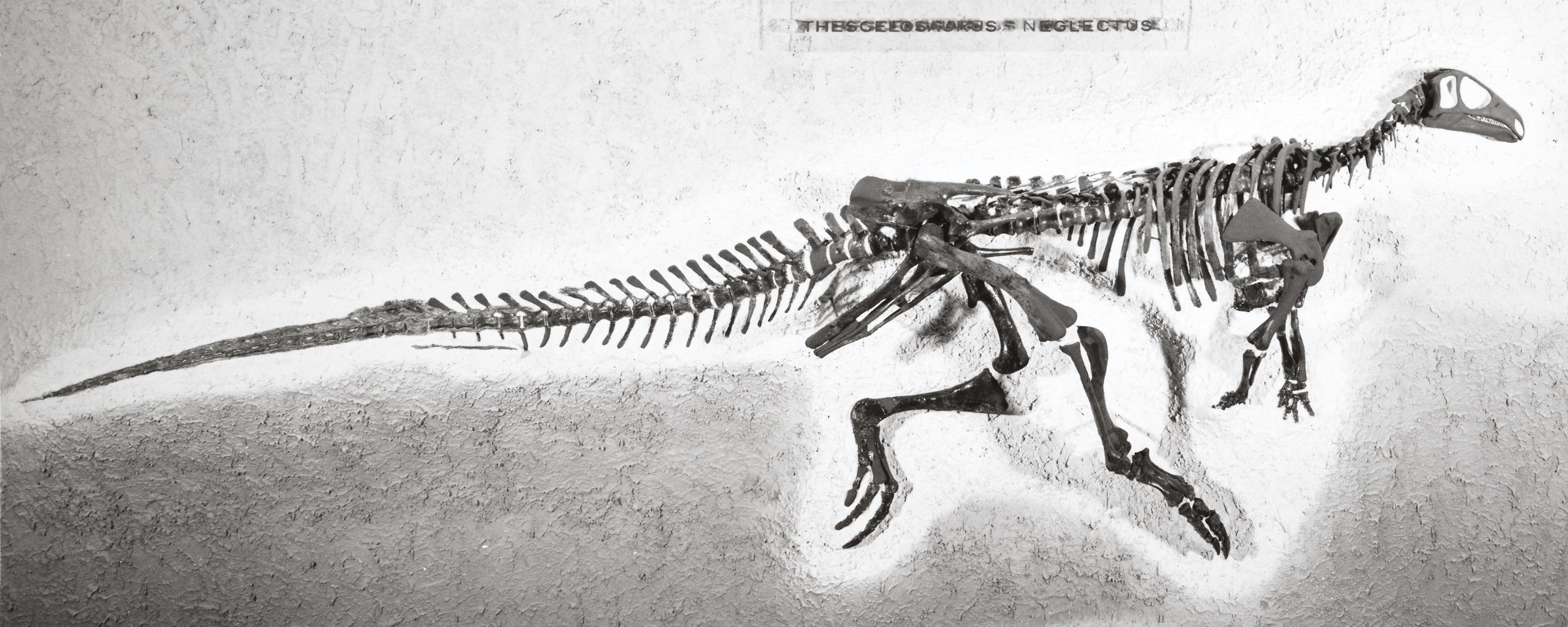
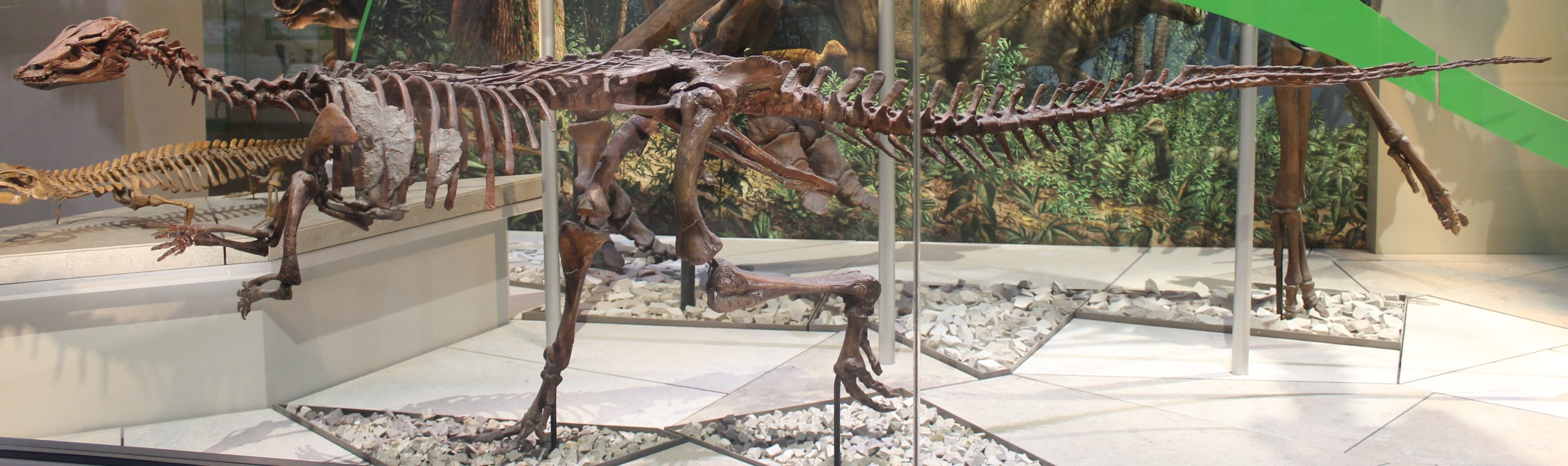
T. neglectus type specimen USNM 7757 on display in 1963 with reconstructed head and neck, and below as remounted

The first specimens of what would later be named Thescelosaurus were discovered during the Bone Wars, a heated rivalry between the paleontologists Edward Drinker Cope and Othniel Charles Marsh. In July 1891, the fossil hunter John Bell Hatcher, who had been hired by Marsh, and his assistant William H. Utterback discovered a near-complete skeleton of a small herbivorous dinosaur along Doegie Creek in Niobrara County, Wyoming, in rocks of the Lance Formation. The skeleton was found lying on its left side and largely in natural articulation, with only the head and neck lost to erosion. It was taken to the Smithsonian Institution's National Museum of Natural History (USNM), (Note: At the time known as "United States National Museum") where it remained in its original, unlabelled packing box. In 1903, the USNM hired the paleontologist Charles W. Gilmore to work on the extensive collection that had been amassed under the direction of Marsh, who had died in 1899. It was not before 1913 that Gilmore opened the box and, to his surprise, found the skeleton of a new species of dinosaur. In 1913, Gilmore published a preliminary description naming the new genus and species Thescelosaurus neglectus. In addition to Hatcher's specimen (USNM 7757), which became the type specimen of the new species, Gilmore assigned a second, more fragmentary skeleton from Lance Creek, also in Niobrara County, to the species (paratype, USNM 7758). The generic name derives from the Greek words θέσκελος (theskelos), 'marvelous', and σαυρος (sauros) 'reptile' or 'lizard'. The specific name, neglectus, is Latin for 'neglected' or 'overlooked', as the type specimen had been unattended to for so long.

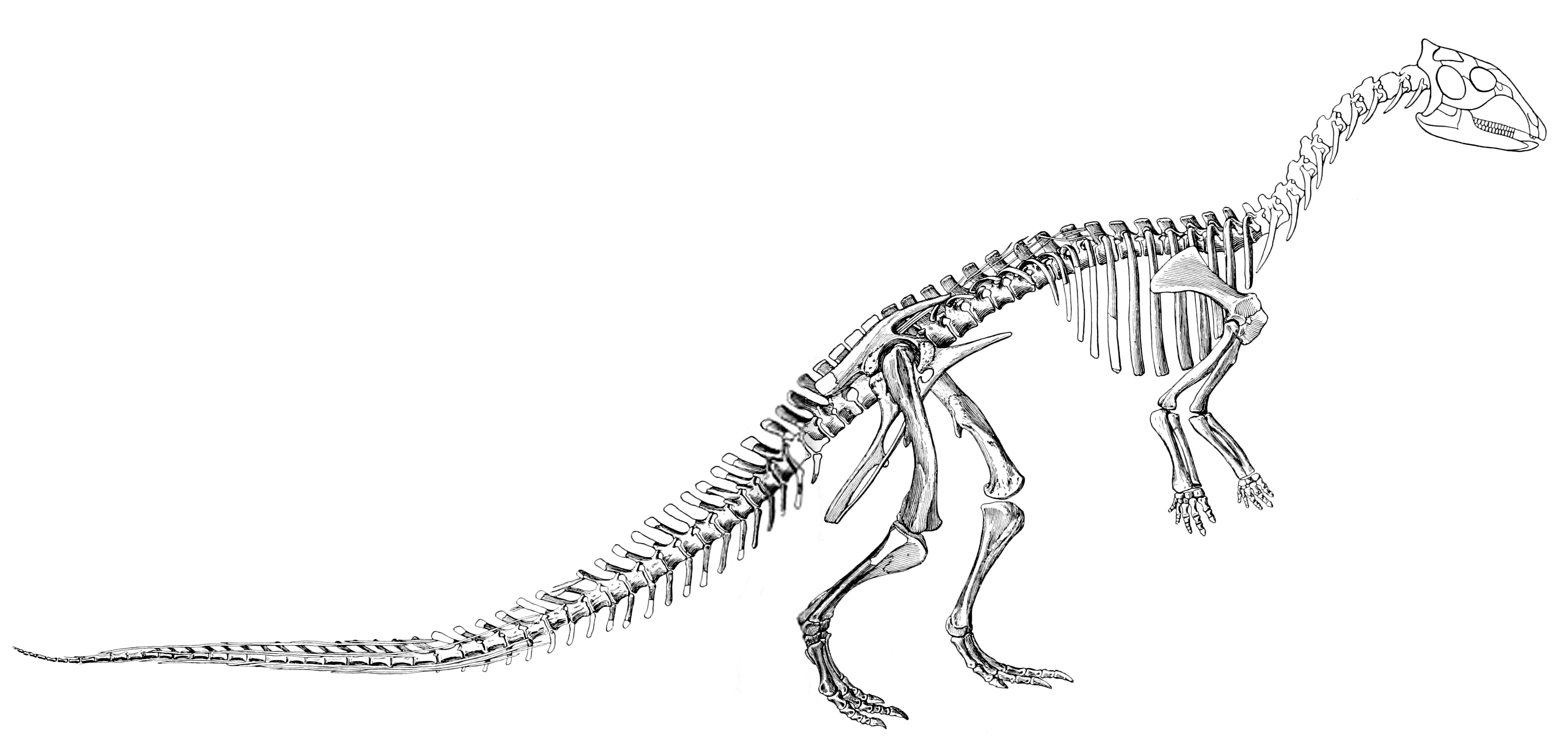
Charles Gilmore's 1915 skeletal reconstruction of the T. neglectus type specimen (known remains are shaded) with head and neck after Hypsilophodon

Gilmore published a comprehensive description in 1915 after the type specimen was fully prepared. He identified six more specimens, including a shoulder blade with coracoid, a neck vertebra, and a toe bone, as well as three partial skeletons that had been collected by Barnum Brown and were stored in the American Museum of Natural History (AMNH). The neck and skull remained unknown, however, and Gilmore restored these missing parts based on Hypsilophodon, which he considered a close relative, in his skeletal and life reconstructions. For the museum display of the type specimen, Gilmore maintained its original posture and incompleteness. Only the right leg, which was slightly dislocated, was adjusted in position, and some minor damage to the bones was restored, but painted lighter than the original bones so that the real and reconstructed parts could be distinguished visually. In 1963, the display was included in a wall mount alongside the ornithischians Edmontosaurus and Corythosaurus and the theropod Gorgosaurus. In 1981 the display was rearranged, placing Thescelosaurus higher and more out-of-sight. Renovations of the exhibit from 2014 to 2019 removed the Thescelosaurus and other dinosaurs on display, replacing them with plaster casts so that the original fossils could be further prepared and studied.

=== T. edmontonensis, revision, and T. garbanii ===
In 1926, William Parks described the new species T. warreni from a well-preserved skeleton from Alberta, Canada, from what was then known as the Edmonton Formation. This skeleton had notable differences from T. neglectus, and so Charles M. Sternberg placed it in a new genus, Parksosaurus, in 1937. In 1940, Sternberg named an additional species, T. edmontonensis, based on another articulated skeleton (CMN 8537) that he had discovered in the Edmonton Formation of Rumsey, Alberta. Sternberg had already mentioned this specimen in 1926, though it was still unprepared at that time. It preserves most of the vertebral column, pelvis, legs, scapula, coracoid, arm, and, most significantly, multiple bones of the skull roof and a complete mandible, the first known from Thescelosaurus. Newer geology has separated the Edmonton Formation into four formations, with Parksosaurus from the older Horseshoe Canyon Formation and Thescelosaurus edmontonensis from the younger Scollard Formation.

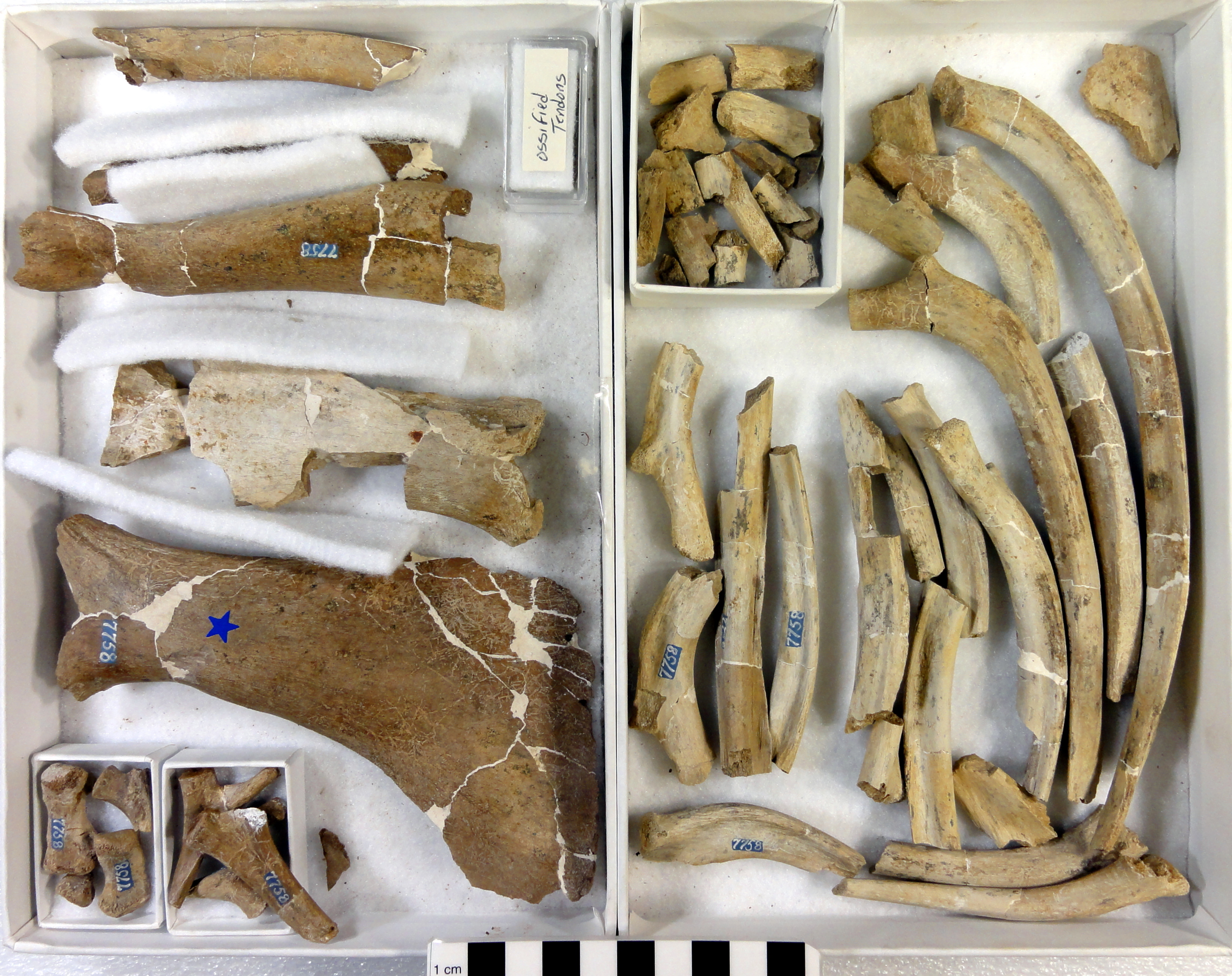
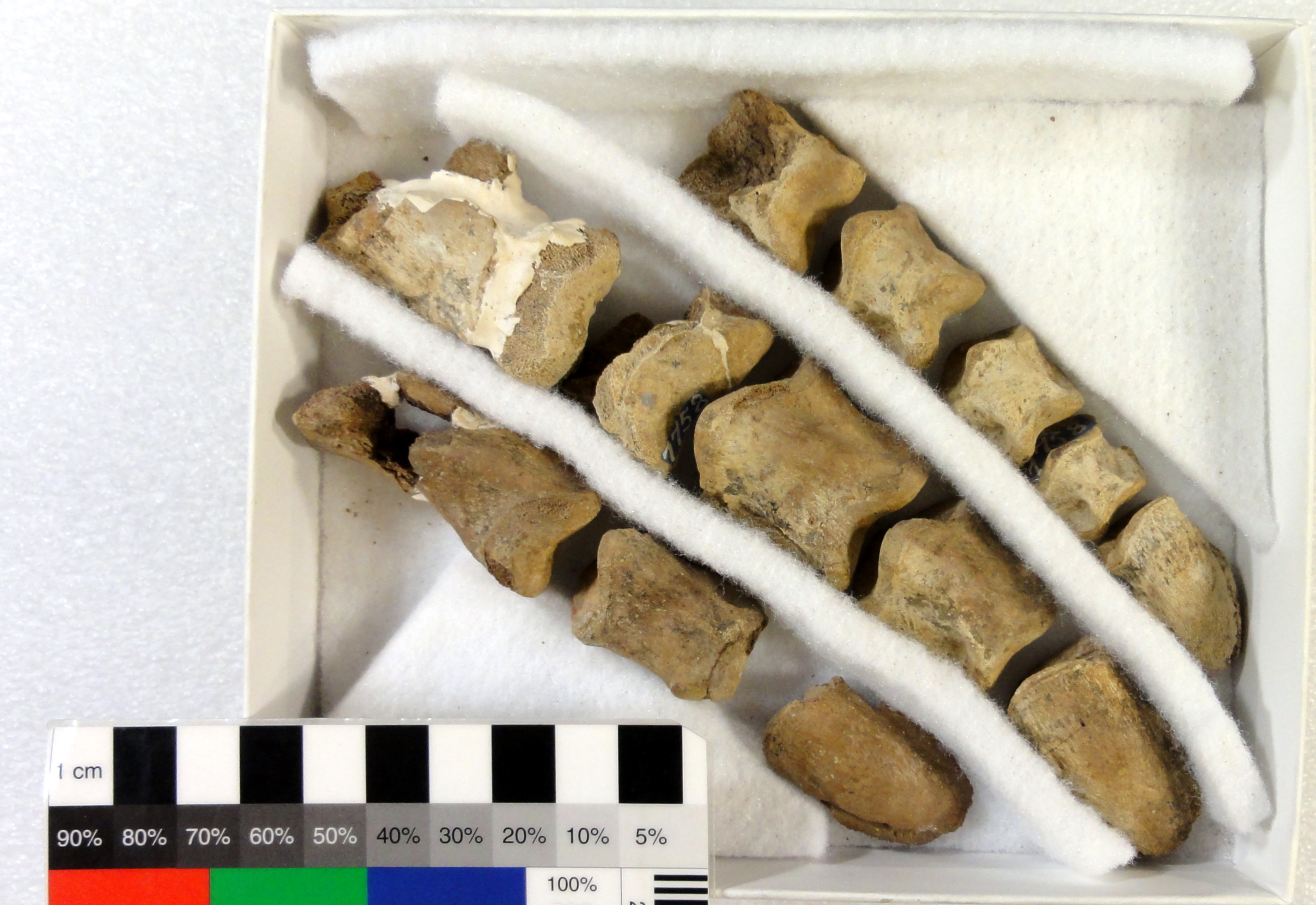
T. neglectus paratype USNM 7758 fossils as stored in the Smithsonian

In 1974, Peter M. Galton revised Thescelosaurus and described additional specimens, resulting in a total of 15 specimens known. These include four specimens from the Hell Creek Formation collected by Barnum Brown in Montana in 1906 and 1909, some of which had already been mentioned by Gilmore in 1915; one specimen found in 1892 by Wortman and Peterson at an uncertain location; two specimens found in 1921 by Levi Sternberg in the Frenchman Formation of Rocky Creek, Saskatchewan; and two isolated bones, also from Saskatchewan. One of Browns specimens, AMNH 5034, was found just 5 ft (1.5 m) below the Fort Union Formation, at the youngest locality from which dinosaurs were found. Galton concluded that T. edmontonensis was simply a more robust individual of T. neglectus (possibly the opposite sex of the type individual).

William J. Morris described three additional partial skeletons in 1976, two found in the Hell Creek Formation of Garfield County, Montana by preparator Harli Garbani, and one from an unknown location in Harding County, South Dakota. The first specimen (LACM 33543) preserves parts of the vertebral column and pelvis in addition to bones of the skull not yet known from Thescelosaurus such as the jugals and braincase. The second specimen (LACM 33542) includes vertebrae from the neck and back, and a nearly complete lower leg with a partial femur. Morris concluded that its ankle anatomy and larger size was unique, and therefore named the new species Thescelosaurus garbanii, in honor of the discoverer Garbani. Morris also argued that the ankle of T. edmontonensis, which Galton claimed was damaged and misinterpreted, was truly different from T. neglectus and more similar to T. garbanii. Therefore, he suggested that T. edmontonensis and T. garbanii may eventually be separated from Thescelosaurus as a new genus. The third specimen (SDSM 7210) includes a large part of the skull, some partial vertebrae from the back and two bones of the fingers, parts that do not overlap with the diagnostic regions of the T. neglectus type specimen, preventing comparisons. Morris provisionally assigned the specimen to Thescelosaurus, but suggested that it could represent a new species; this potential species has later been called the "Hell Creek hypsilophodontid".

=== Bugenasaura and the "Willo" specimen ===
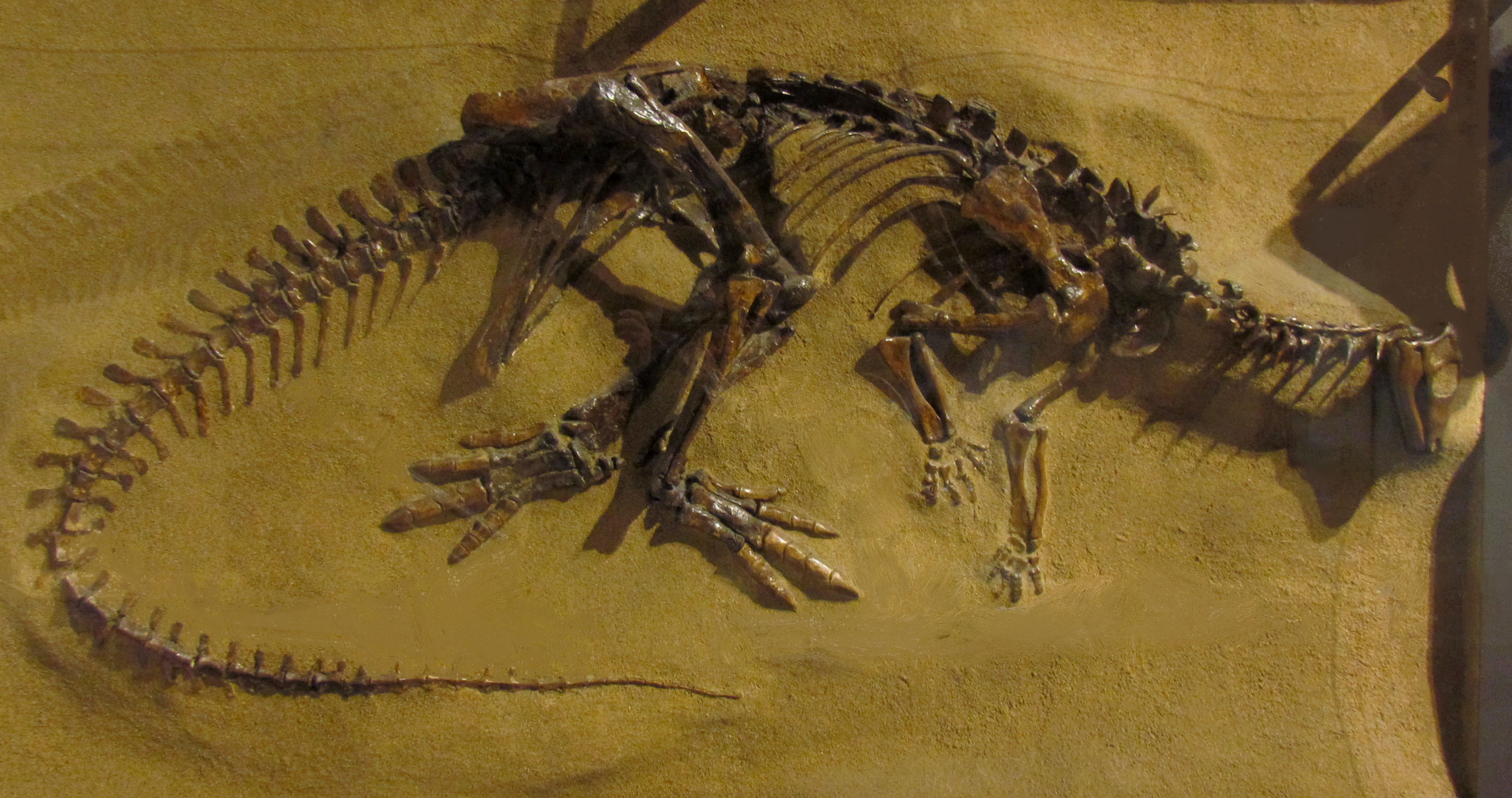
Cast of CMN 8537, the type specimen of T. edmontonensis

Galton revised Thescelosaurus for a second time in 1995. He argued that the supposedly diagnostic traits of the ankle of the T. edmontonensis specimen are the result of breakage, as indicated by the previously undescribed left ankle of that specimen that showed the same anatomy as T. neglectus. Consequently, he synonymized T. edmontonensis with T. neglectus. Galton determined that Morris correctly interpreted the ankle of T. garbanii and suggested that the species could be elevated to a genus of its own. There was also the possibility that the hindlimb of T. garbanii did instead belong to the pachycephalosaurid Stygimoloch, which is also known from the Hell Creek Formation and for which the hindlimb was unknown. Galton also concluded that the skull of SDSM 7210, the third of the specimens described by Morris, was distinct from Thescelosaurus, and therefore named the new taxon Bugenasaura infernalis. The name is a combination of the Latin bu, 'large' and gena, 'cheek', as well as the Ancient Greek saura, 'lizard'. The specific name, from the Latin infernalis, 'belonging to the lower regions', is a reference to the lower levels of the Hell Creek Formation from which it is known. Galton also tentatively assigned LACM 33543, the type of T. garbanii, to the new species, noting that additional material is necessary to determine if the referral is correct, and that the name garbanii should have priority if this turns out to be the case.

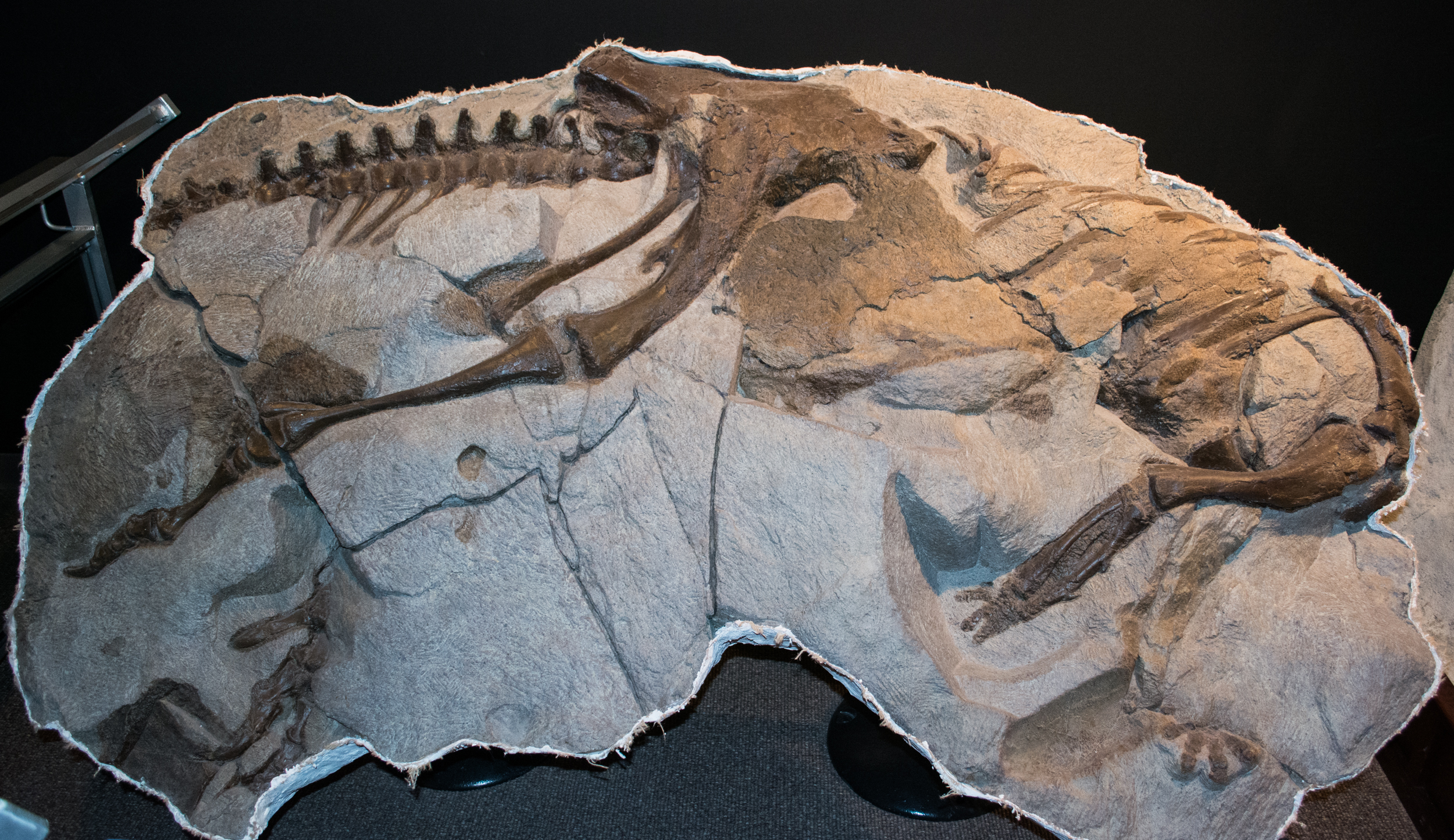
Thescelosaurus with skin impressions, Museum of the Rockies specimen 979

In his 1995 revision, Galton also reassigned isolated teeth from the Judith River Formation of Montana (dated to the Campanian) to the related genus Orodromeus. These teeth had been assigned to Thescelosaurus cf. neglectus by Ashok Sahni in 1972, which would have been the oldest occurrence of Thescelosaurus. In a 1999 study on the anatomy of Bugenasaura, Galton assigned a tooth in the collection of the University of California Museum of Paleontology (UCMP 49611) to the latter. Significantly, this tooth reportedly came from the Late Jurassic-era Kimmeridge Clay Formation of Weymouth, England, and therefore is roughly 70 million years older than the Bugenasaura type specimen and from another continent. Galton argued that it had possibly been mislabelled and was actually from the Lance Formation of Wyoming, but the tooth was first collected before the museum was active in the Lance region. The lack of diagnostic features led Paul M. Barrett and Susannah Maidment to classify the tooth as an indeterminate ornithischian in 2011.

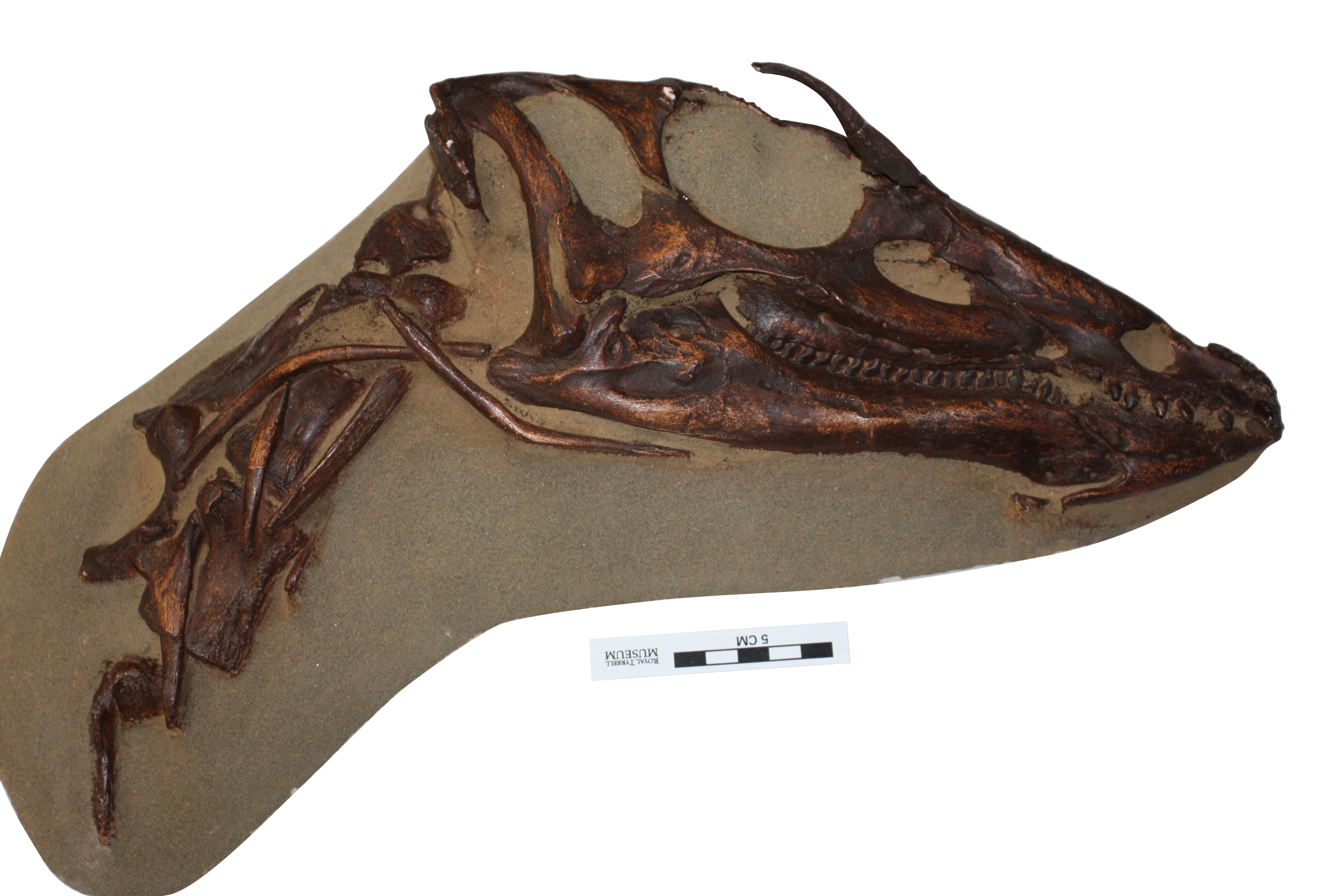
Cast of skull and part of neck of the T. neglectus specimen "Willo" before complete preparation

After the discovery of additional specimens of Thescelosaurus preserving both the skull and skeleton, Clint Boyd and colleagues reassessed the historic and current species of Thescelosaurus in 2009. One of the new specimens (MOR 979) was found in the Hell Creek of Montana and preserves a nearly complete skull and skeleton. The researchers also identified previously overlooked skull material of the T. neglectus paratype USNM 7758, which allowed comparisons of the diagnostic regions of the skull and ankle across multiple specimens and species. The key specimen, however, was NCSM 15728, nicknamed "Willo", which was found in the upper Hell Creek Formation in Harding County, South Dakota by Michael Hammer in 1999. This specimen preserves most of the skeleton and a mass in the chest cavity that was initially interpreted as a heart. "Willo" also includes a complete skull, showing that it was much lower and longer than previously thought. "Willo" and the other new specimens made it clear that Bugenasaura infernalis must be assigned to Thescelosaurus. By reassigning the species, Boyd and colleagues created the new combination T. infernalis which they considered undiagnostic.

=== T. assiniboiensis and further discoveries ===
Another species, T. assiniboiensis, was named by Caleb M. Brown and colleagues in 2011 based on a specimen (RSM P 1225.1) found in 1968 by Albert Swanston, a museum technician at the Royal Saskatchewan Museum. The specific name, assiniboiensis, derives from the historic District of Assiniboia that covered the southern Saskatchewan region where the Frenchman Formation is exposed, which in turn takes its name from the Assiniboine peoples. When discovered, the specimen was articulated, with its tail weathering out of a hill side. It is a small specimen including a fragmentary skull, most of the vertebral column, the pelvic girdles and the hind limbs. The locality of the specimen as originally reported was incorrect, as revisiting of the Frenchman River valley by Tim Tokaryk in the 1980s found that the excavation, identifiable by bone and plaster remnants, actually took place on the north side of the valley, approximately halfway up the exposed claystone. This places the specimen in the Frenchman Formation.

Specimens can only be directly compared if they preserve the same bones, but overlapping material is often not available – the assignment of most Thescelosaurus specimens to any of the three recognized species therefore remained uncertain. This situation improved in 2014, when Boyd and colleagues reported a new specimen from the Hell Creek Formation of Dewey County, South Dakota (TLAM.BA.2014.027.0001), that was collected from private lands by Bill Alley before being donated to the Timber Lake and Area Museum. This specimen had yet to be fully prepared but includes a mostly complete but slightly crushed skull and much of the skeleton. This find allowed the assignment of this specimen and the "Willo" specimen to T. neglectus. In 2022, news media reported that a specimen of Thescelosaurus was found at the Tanis fossil site in North Dakota, which is thought to show direct signs of the Chicxulub asteroid impact in the Gulf of Mexico that resulted in the K-Pg extinction.

== Description ==
Size of two Thescelosaurus species (right) compared to its relatives Parksosaurus (center) and Orodromeus (left), as well as a human

The skeletal anatomy of this genus is well documented overall, and restorations have been published in several papers, including skeletal restorations and models. The skeleton is known well enough that a detailed reconstruction of the hip and hindlimb muscles has been made. The largest known thescelosaurid, its body length has been estimated at 2.5–4.0 m (8 ft 2 in – 13 ft 1 in) and the weight at 200–300 kg (440–660 lb), with the large type specimen of T. garbanii estimated at 4–4.5 m (13–15 ft) long. It may have been sexually dimorphic, with one sex larger than the other.

=== Skull ===
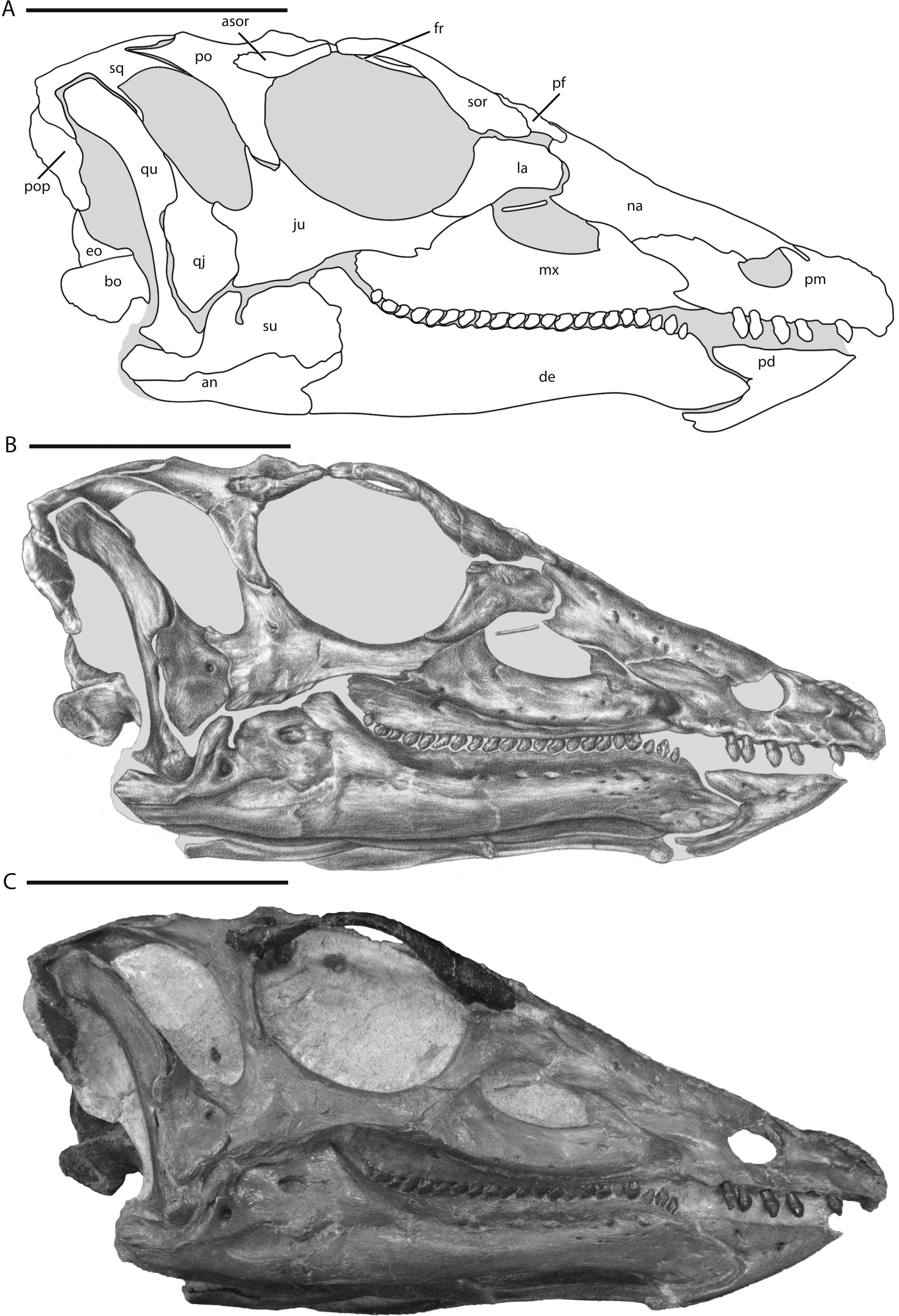
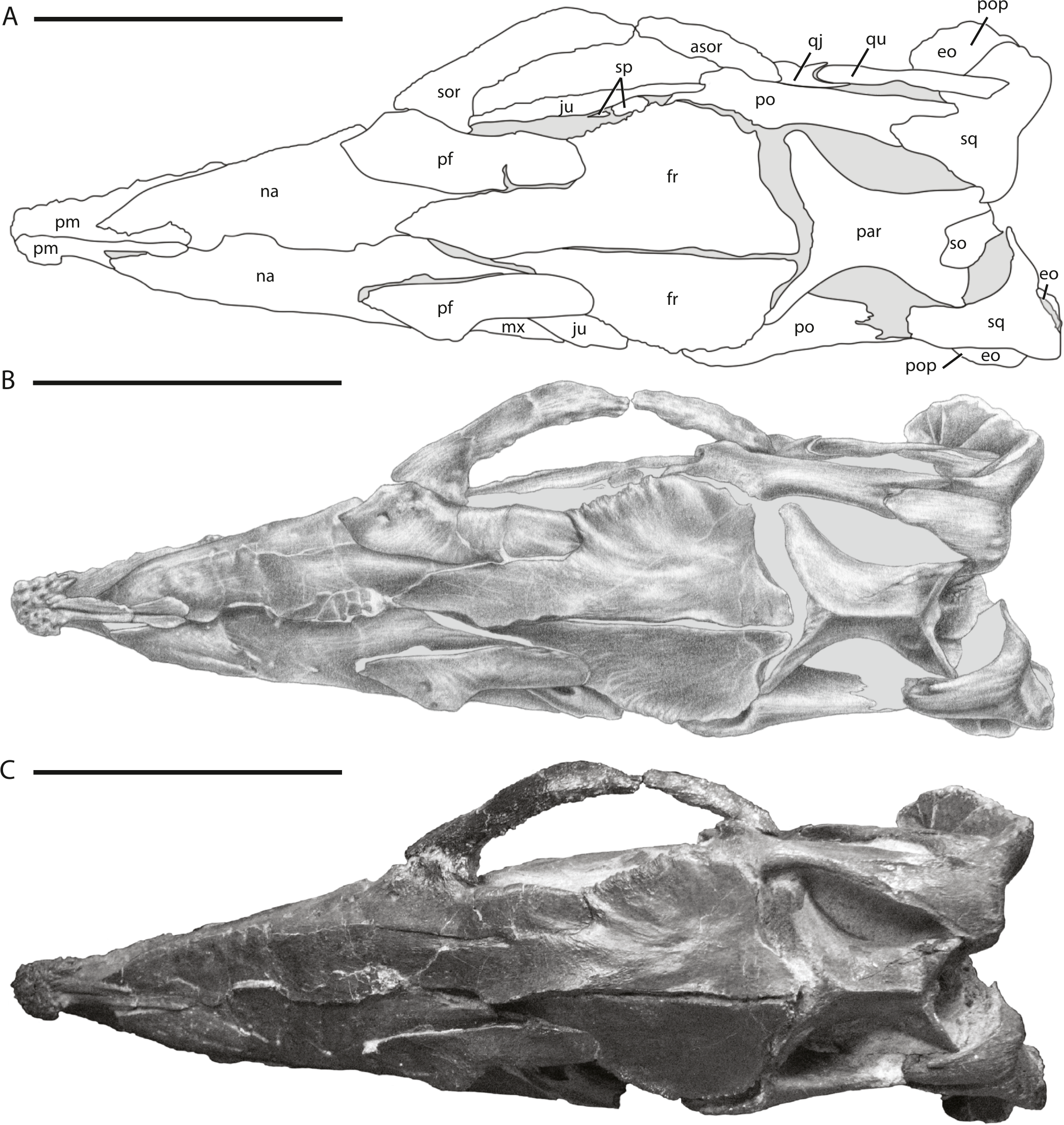
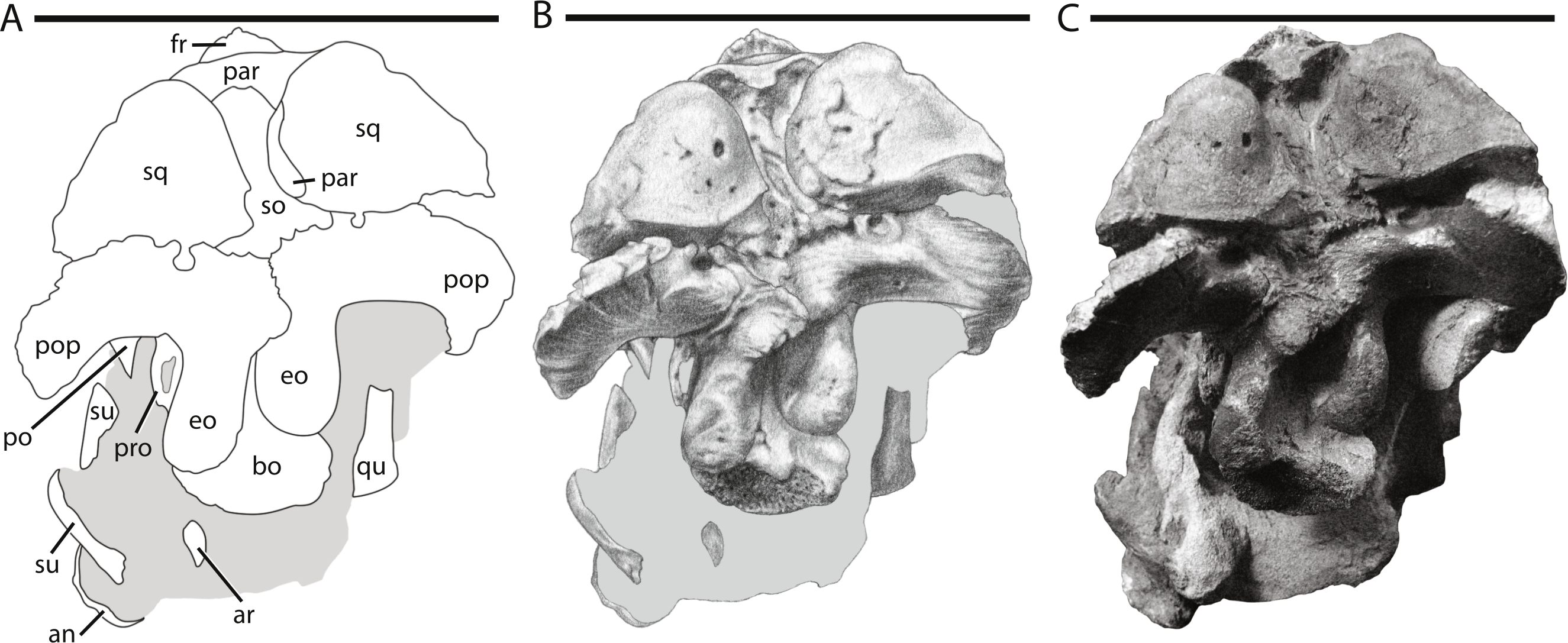
Skull of T. neglectus "Willo" in right, top, and hind view

The skull is best known from T. neglectus, mostly thanks to the excellently preserved "Willo" specimen which has been CT-scanned to reveal its internal details. A fragmentary skull is also known from T. assiniboiensis (RSM P 1225.1). Most autapomorphies – distinguishing features that are not found in related genera – are found in the skull. The skull also shows many plesiomorphies, "primitive" (basal) features that are typically found in ornithischians that are geologically much older, but also shows derived (advanced) features.

The skull had a long, low snout that ended in a toothless beak. As in other dinosaurs, it was perforated by several fenestrae, or skull openings. Of these, the orbit (eye socket) and the infratemporal fenestra (behind the orbit) were proportionally large, while the external naris (nostril) was small. The external naris was formed by the premaxilla (the front bone of the upper jaw) and the nasal bone, while the maxilla (the tooth-bearing "cheek" bone) was excluded. Another fenestra, the antorbital fenestra, was in-between the external naris and the orbit and contained two smaller internal fenestrae. Long rod-like bones called palpebrals were present above the eyes, giving the animal heavy bony eyebrows. The palpebral was not aligned with the upper margin of the orbit as in some other ornithischians, but protruded across it. The frontal bones, which form the skull roof above the orbit, were widest at the level of the middle of the orbit and narrower at their posterior (rear) ends – an autapomorphy of Thescelosaurus.

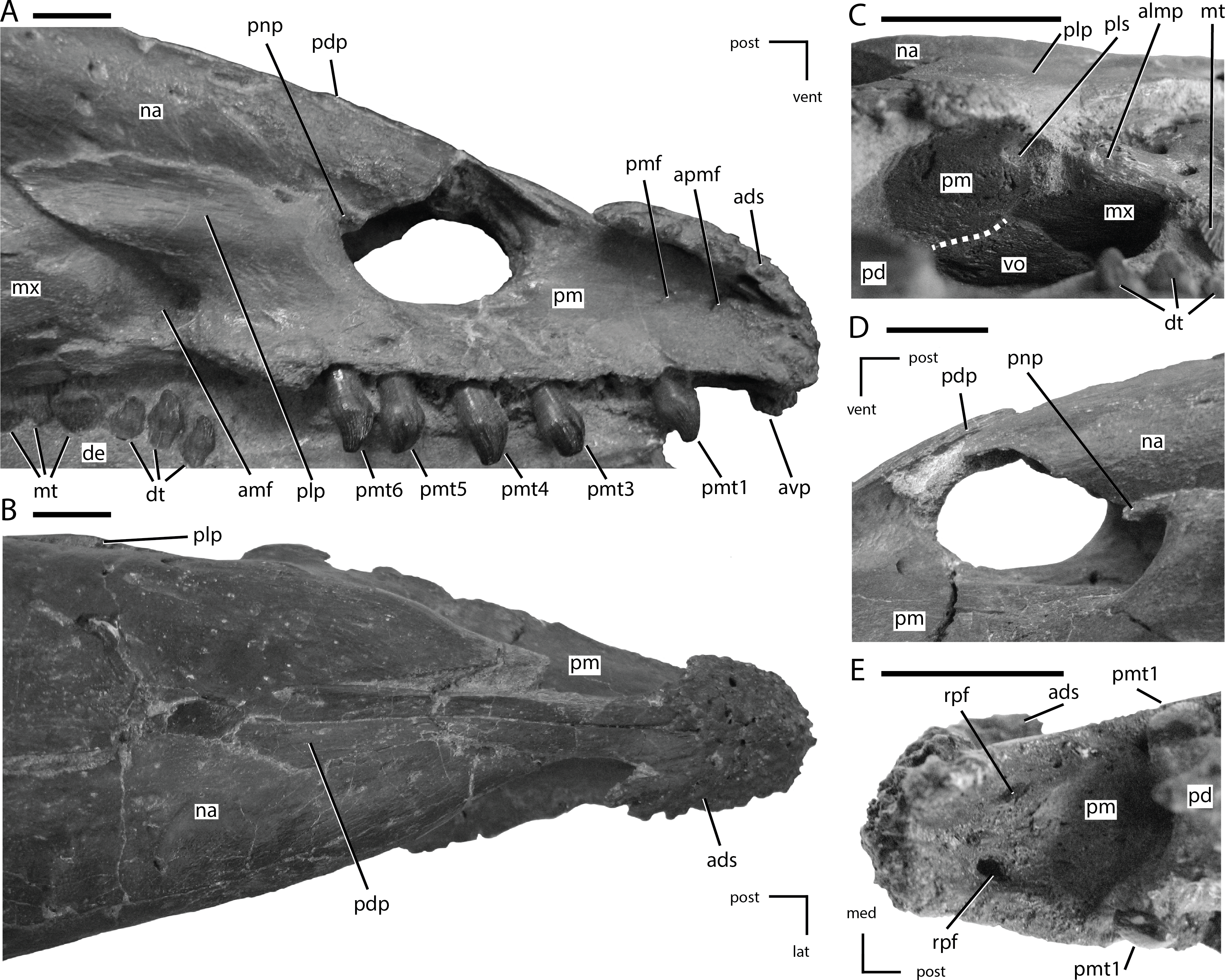
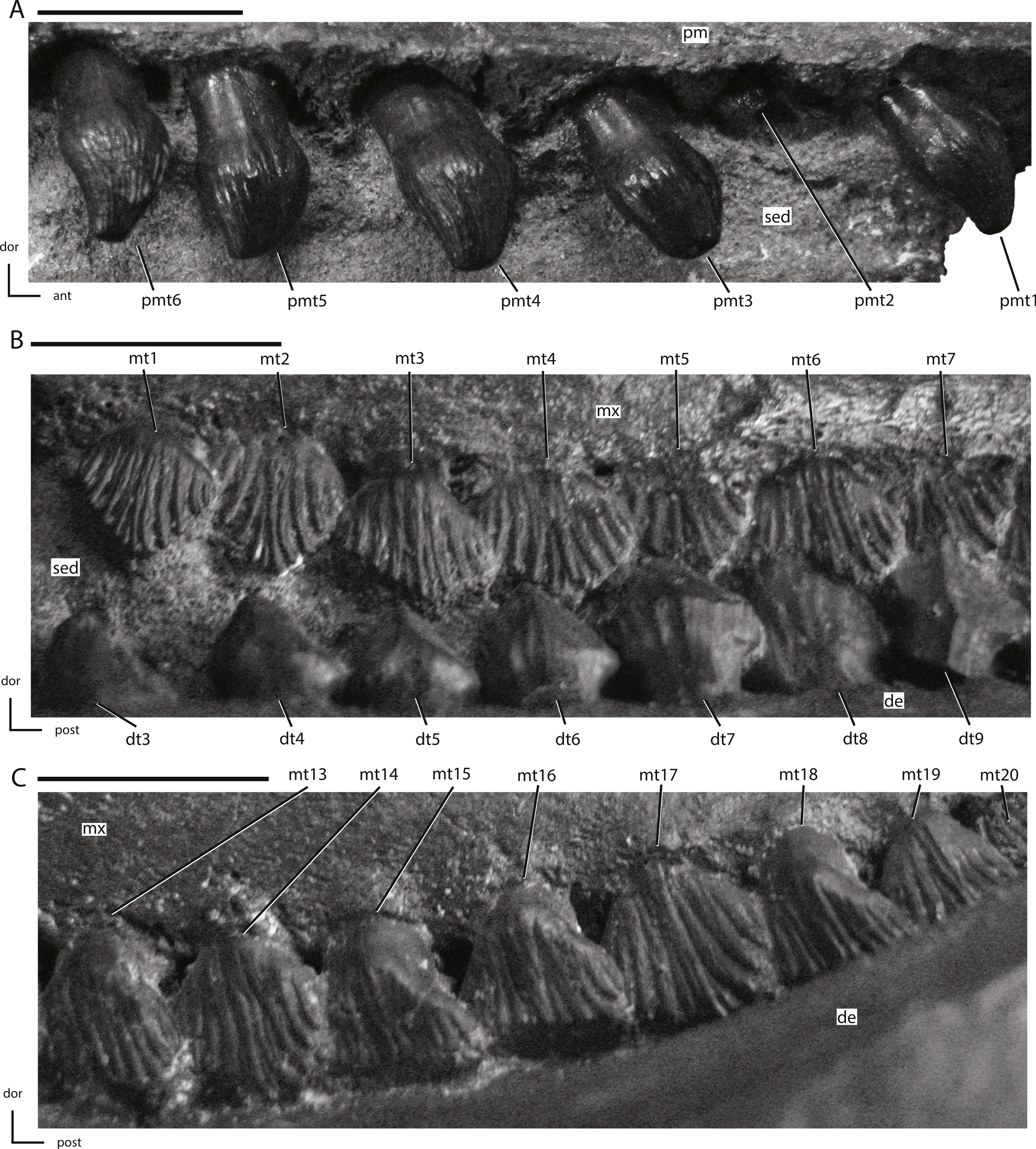
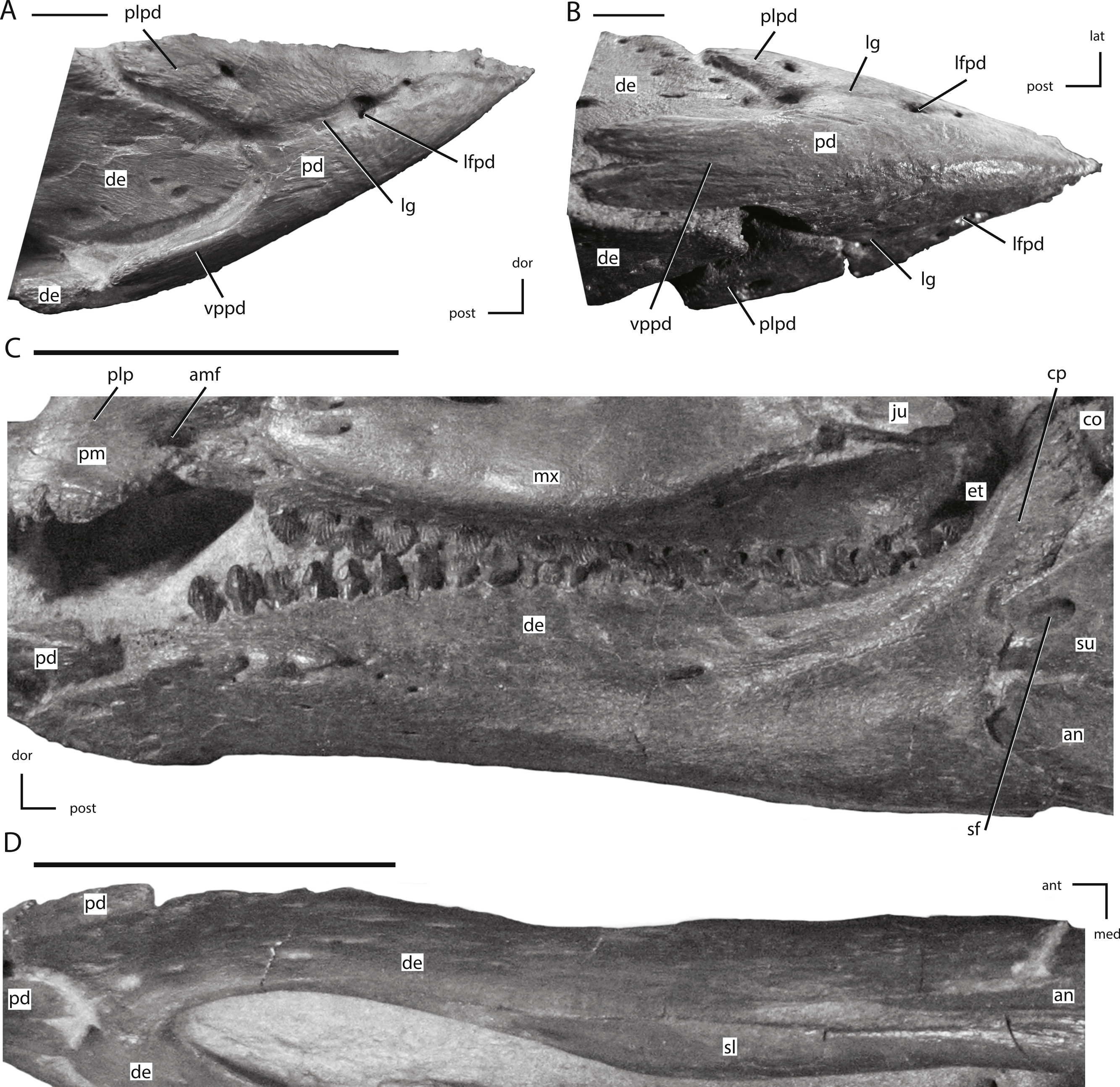
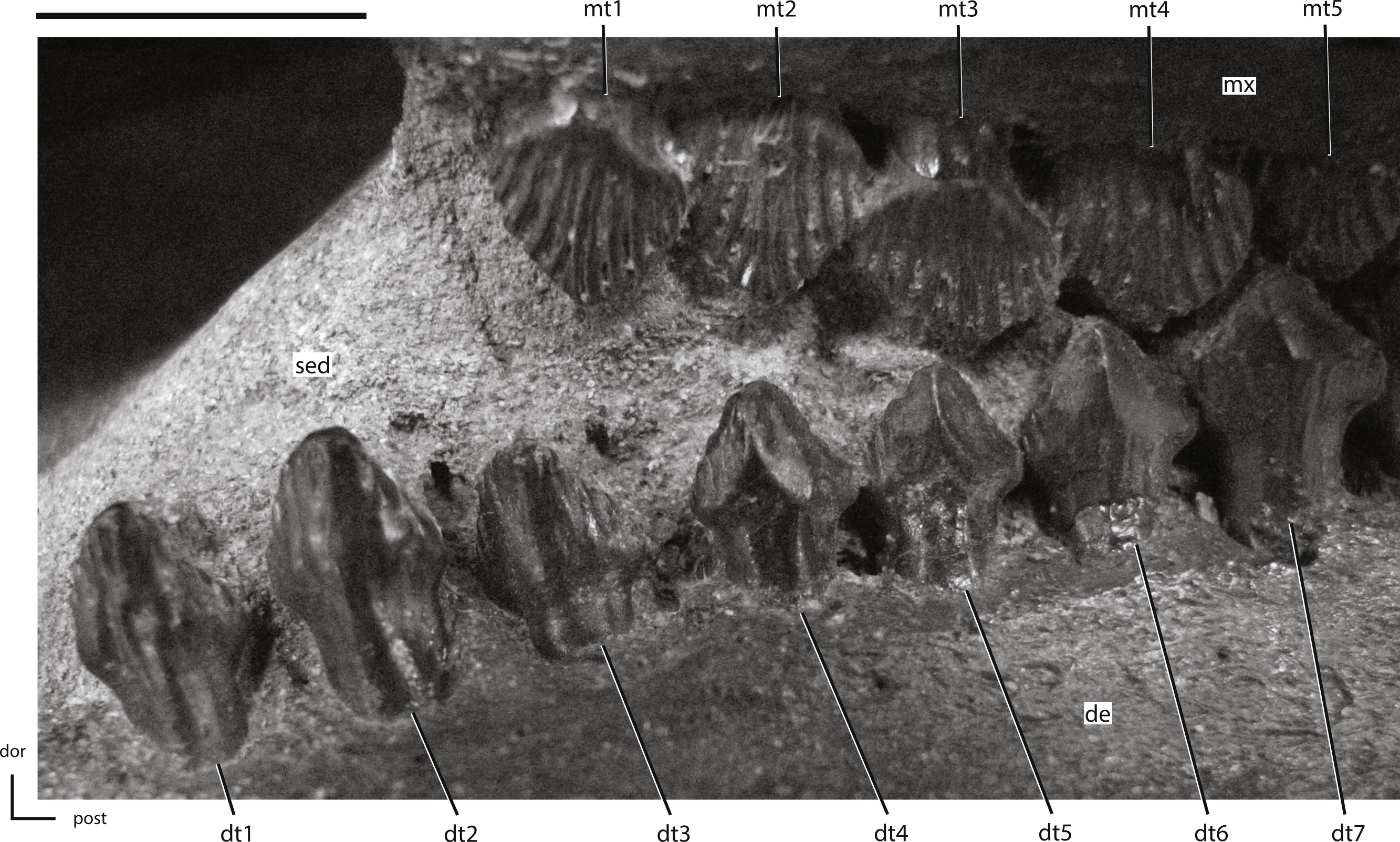
Snout areas and teeth of "Willo"

There was a prominent ridge along the length of both maxillae; a similar ridge was also present on both dentaries (the tooth-bearing bone of the lower jaw). The ridges and position of the teeth, deeply internal to the outside surface of the skull, have been interpreted as evidence for muscular cheeks. The morphology of the ridge on the maxilla, which is very pronounced and has small and oblique ridges covering its posterior end, is an autapomorphy of the genus. The teeth were of different types: small pointed premaxillary teeth, and leaf-shaped cheek teeth that differed between the maxilla and the dentary. The premaxillae had six teeth each, a primitive trait among ornithischians that is otherwise only found in much earlier and more basal forms such as Lesothosaurus and Scutellosaurus. Immature individuals may have had less than six premaxillary teeth. Unlike many other basal ornithischians, the premaxillary teeth lacked serrations (small protuberances on the cutting edges). Both the maxilla and the dentary had up to twenty cheek teeth on each side, which is again similar to basal ornithischians and unlike other neornithischians, which had a reduced tooth count. The cheek teeth themselves likewise showed primitive features, such as a constriction that separated the crowns from their roots, and a cingulum (bulge surrounding the tooth) above the constriction. The front bone of the lower jaw was the predentary, which was unique to ornithischians. When seen from below, the posterior end of the predentary was bifurcated, which is a derived feature.

Boyd and colleagues, in 2014, listed seven skull features that separate T. assiniboiensis from T. neglectus, most of which are found in the braincase at the back of the skull. These include, amongst others, a foramen (small opening) piercing the roof of the braincase (absent in T. neglectus); the flattened anterior (front) surface of the basioccipital bone (V-shaped in T. neglectus); and the trigeminal foramen (the opening for the trigeminal nerve) piercing both the prootic and laterosphenoid bones (restricted to the prootic in T. neglectus).

=== Vertebrae and limbs ===
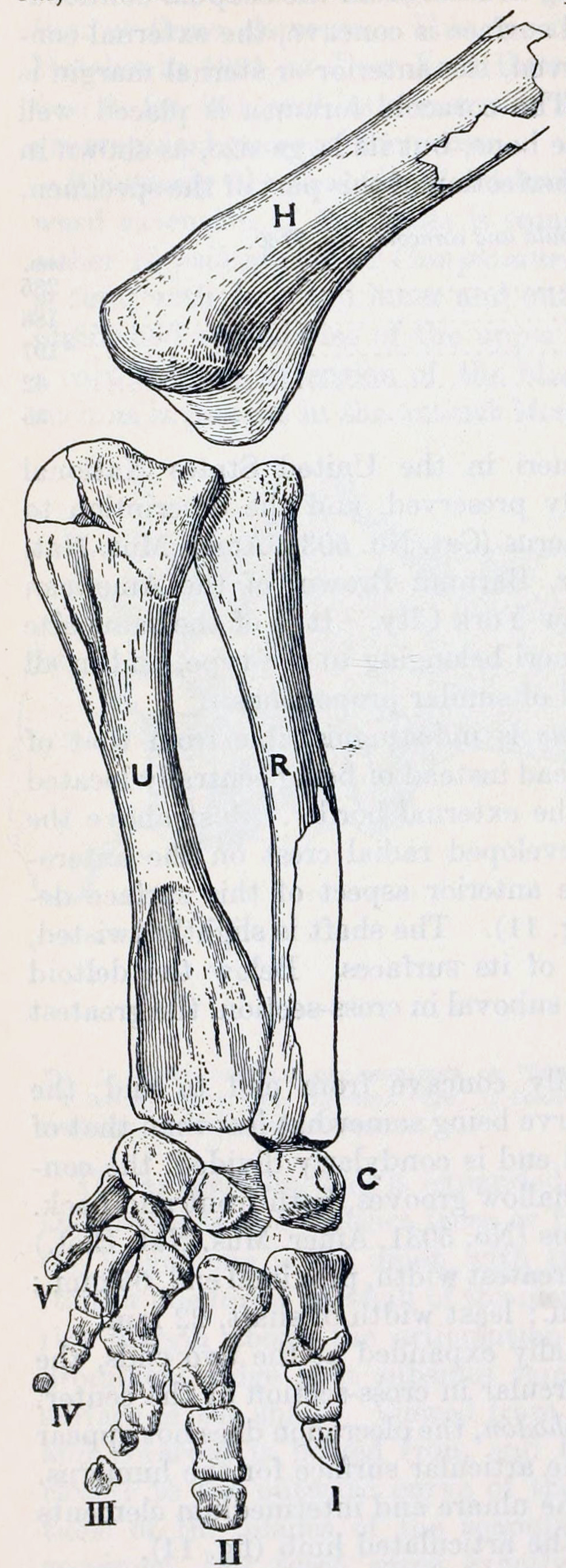
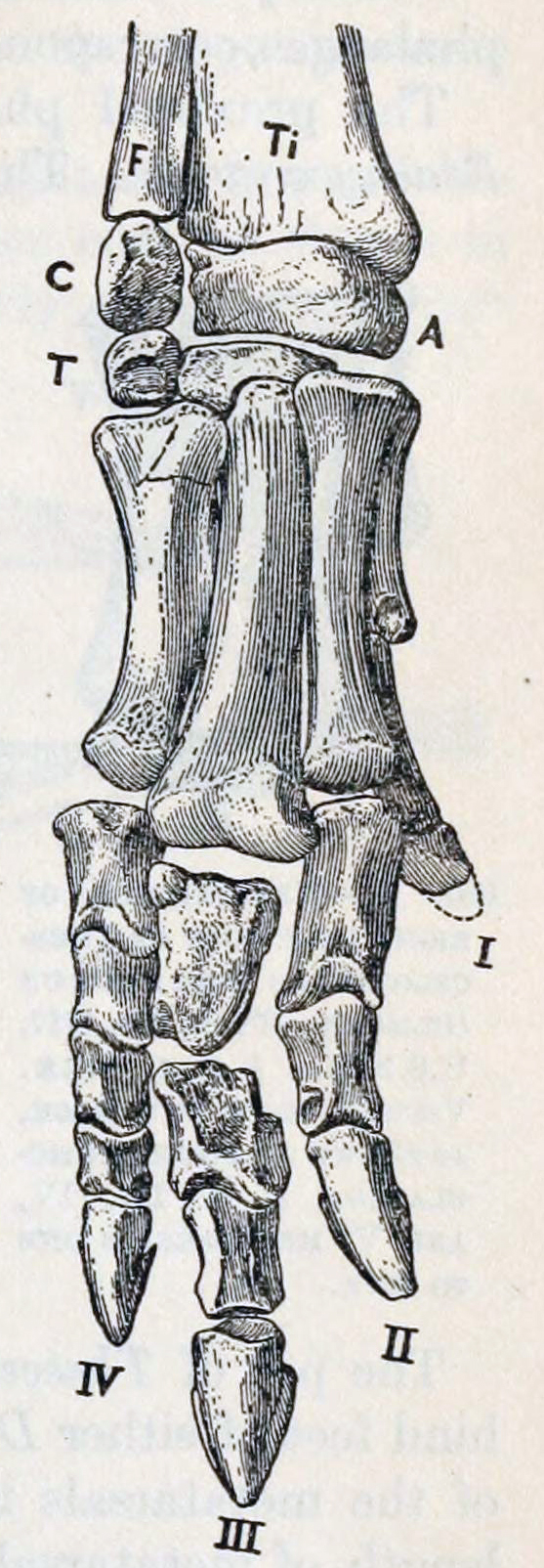
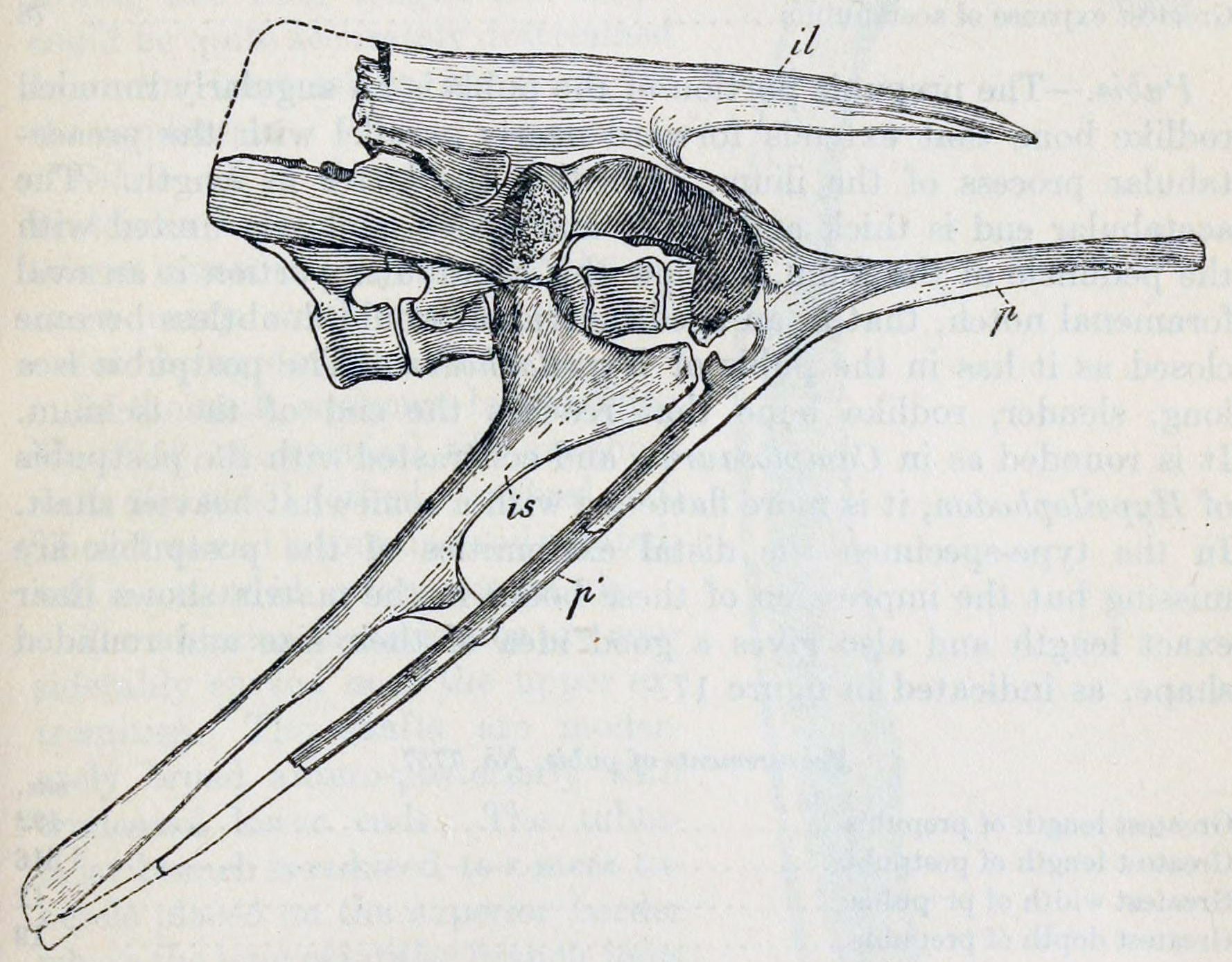
Illustrations of the lower arm, foot, and pelvis of the type specimen, 1915

T. neglectus had 6 sacral ("hip") vertebrae and 27 presacral ("neck and back") vertebrae. The type specimen of T. assiniboiensis appears to have had only five sacrals, but it is possible that this individual was not yet fully mature and that the last sacral was not yet fused to the other sacrals. The tail was long and made up half of the total body length. It was braced by ossified tendons from the middle to the tip, which would have reduced the flexibility of the tail. The rib cage was broad, giving it a wide back. Large thin and flat mineralized plates have been found next to the ribs' sides, so-called intercostal plates. The anterior ribs were flattened and concave, and the posterior margins of their lower ends had a rough surface. These features are autapomorphies of Thescelosaurus and are possibly adaptations that allow the plates to attach to the rib cage.

The limbs were robust. The femur (thigh bone) was longer than the tibia (shin bone), which distinguishes the genus from closely related genera. Thescelosaurus had short, broad, five-fingered hands. The second digit was the longest, and the fifth digit was strongly reduced in size. Only the first three digits ended in hooflike unguals. There were two phalanges (finger bones) in the first digit, three in the second, four in the third, three in the fourth, and two in the fifth. The foot had five metatarsals, though only the first four carried digits, with the fifth metatarsal being vestigial (reduced to a small splint). The first metatarsal was only half the length of the third, and its digit might not have regularly touched the ground. Most of the animal's weight was therefore supported by the center three digits, of which the middle (third) was the longest. The first digit had two phalanges, the second had three, the third had four, and the fourth had five. The digits were shorter than the metatarsals, and their phalanges were distinctly flattened. The species T. garbanii differs from the other species in its unique ankle, with the calcaneus being reduced and not contributing to the midtarsal joint.

=== Integument ===
Life restoration of T. neglectus without protofeathers

For most of its history, the nature of this genus' integument, be it scales or something else, remained unknown. Gilmore described patches of carbonized material near the shoulders as possible epidermis, with a "punctured" texture, but no regular pattern, while Morris suggested that armor was present, in the form of small scutes he interpreted as located at least along the midline of the neck of one specimen. Scutes have not been found with other articulated specimens of Thescelosaurus, though, and Galton argued in 2008 that Morris's scutes are crocodilian in origin. In 2022, news media reported that the Tanis specimen preserves skin impressions on a leg that show that parts of the animal were covered in scales.

== Classification ==
In his 1913 description of Thescelosaurus, Gilmore considered it to be a member of Camptosauridae, alongside Hypsilophodon, Dryosaurus and Laosaurus. In 1915, he instead placed it within Hypsilophodontidae alongside only Hypsilophodon. Many authors followed this classification within Hypsilophodontidae. Franz Nopcsa and Friedrich von Huene instead retained Thescelosaurus as a relative of Camptosaurus in 1928 and 1956, respectively. In 1937, Sternberg separated Thescelosaurus and the related Parksosaurus into a family of their own, the Thescelosauridae, but considered both genera to be members of the subfamily Thescelosaurinae within Hypsilophodontidae in 1940. Anatoly Konstantinovich Rozhdestvensky and Richard A. Thulborn retained Thescelosauridae as a separate family in 1964 and 1974, respectively. Galton classified Thescelosaurus as a member of Iguanodontidae based on hindlimb proportions in 1974, but this family was found to be polyphyletic (not a natural group); he therefore returned to a hypsilophodontid classification in 1995.

Hypsilophodontidae only included four genera in 1940: Hypsilophodon, Thescelosaurus, Parksosaurus, and Dysalotosaurus. In 1966, Alfred Sherwood Romer assigned most small ornithopods to the family, which was followed by Galton and later authors, though Thescelosaurus was not always included in the family. As a result, Hypsilophodontidae included 13 genera in the first edition of the book The Dinosauria in 1990. This concept of Hypsilophodontidae as an inclusive monophyletic (natural) group was supported by the early cladistic studies of Paul C. Sereno, David B. Weishampel, and Ronald Heinrich, who found Thescelosaurus to be the most basal hypsilophodontid. The analysis of Weishampel and Heinrich in 1992 can be seen below.

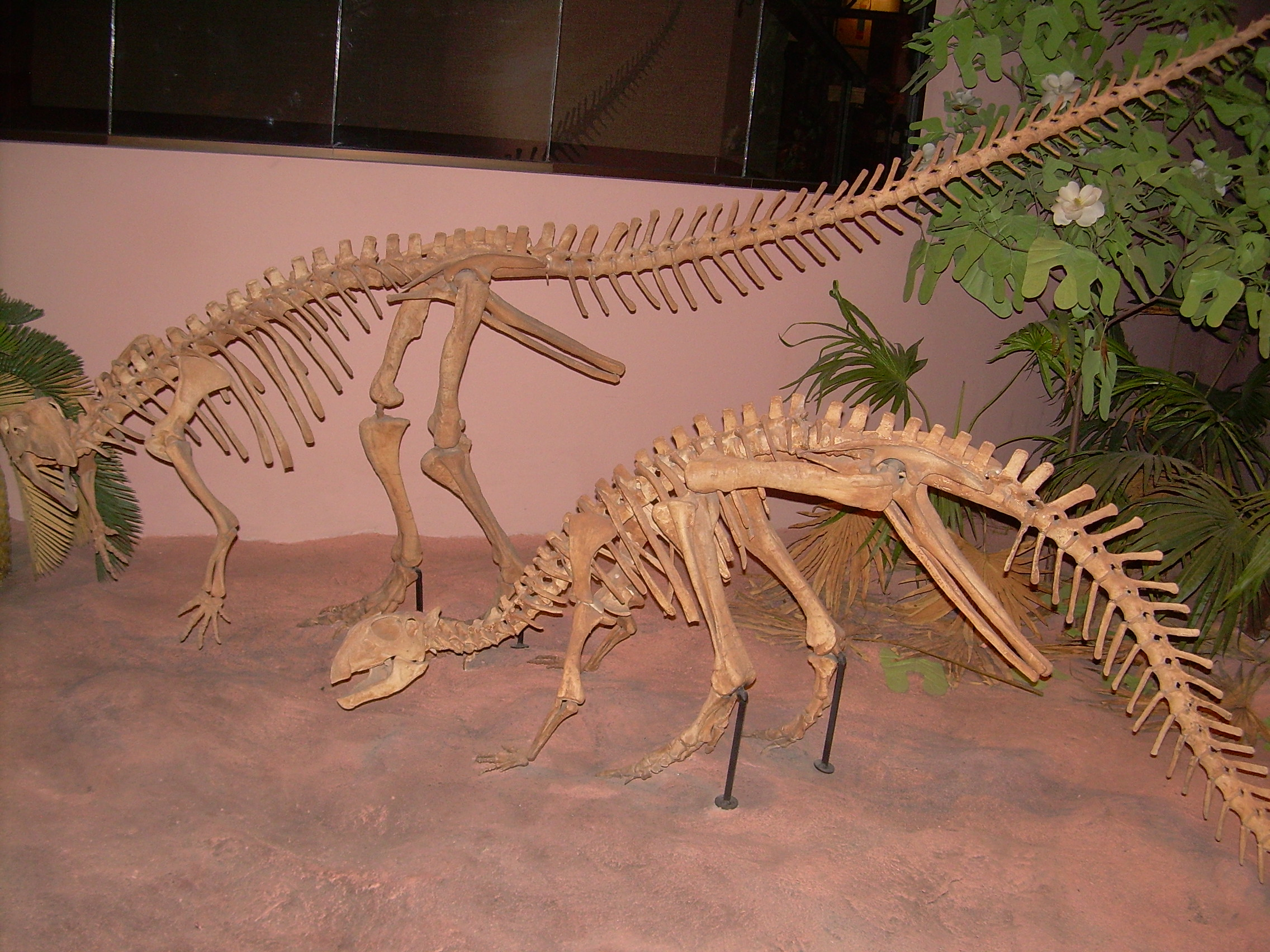
Historically posed skeletons of Thescelosaurus with head and neck reconstructed after Hypsilophodon, which was long thought a close relative, North American Museum of Ancient Life

- Hypsilophodontidae
  - Thescelosaurus
  - - - Yandusaurus
      - Othnielia
    - - - Parksosaurus
        - Hypsilophodon
      - - Zephyrosaurus
        - Orodromeus

The concept of Hypsilophodontidae as a monophyletic group then fell out of favor. Rodney Sheetz suggested in 1999 that "hypsilophodontids" were simply the primitive forms of ornithopods, the larger grouping to which they were commonly assigned. Scheetz found Thescelosaurus, Parksosaurus and Bugenasaura to be successively closer to Hypsilophodon and later ornithopods, but not a group of their own. Other studies had similar results, with Thescelosaurus or Bugenasaura as early ornithopods close to the origin of the group, sometimes forming a clade with Parksosaurus. An issue with T. neglectus prior to the revision by Boyd and colleagues in 2009 was the uncertainty about the assigned specimens, including the separation of Bugenasaura and the unresolved question of whether T. edmontonensis was distinct or not. Following their taxonomic revision, the systematic relationships of Thescelosaurus and "hypsilophodonts" have become clearer, and Boyd and colleagues found support for a larger group of early ornithopods consisting of Thescelosaurus, Parksosaurus, Zephyrosaurus, Orodromeus and Oryctodromeus. Brown and colleagues, while describing T. assiniboiensis in 2011, came to similar results. The same authors confirmed these results again in 2013, prompting them to reintroduce the name Thescelosauridae for the entire group, which was divided into the revised subfamily Thescelosaurinae and the new subfamily Orodrominae.

Other studies did not find Parksosaurus to be closely related to Thescelosaurus, and instead proposed that it was related to the South American Gasparinisaura. However, Boyd argued that the anatomy of Parksosaurus had been misinterpreted, and that Parksosaurus and Thescelosaurus were very closely related if not each other's closest relatives. The clades Thescelosauridae (or, alternatively, Parksosauridae) and Thescelosaurinae have been confirmed by numerous phylogenetic analyses, though not by all. There is also disagreement about whether Thescelosaurus and thescelosaurids are members of Ornithopoda or more basal. Boyd highlighted in 2015 that many phylogenetic studies that included Thescelosaurus either do not include marginocephalians or are unresolved, so there was no definitive evidence that Thescelosaurus was an ornithopod. In his analysis, Thescelosaurus and Thescelosauridae were outside Ornithopoda, instead forming an expansive clade of non-ornithopod neornithischians. Some studies agree with this placement for thescelosaurids, while others support Thescelosaurus as an ornithopod, and others are unresolved. Fonseca and colleagues gave the name Pyrodontia to the clade uniting Thescelosaurus with more derived ornithischians when Thescelosauridae is outside Ornithopoda, referencing the early and rapid diversification of Thescelosauridae, Marginocephalia and Ornithopoda. The thescelosaurid results of Fonseca and colleagues in 2024 can be seen below.

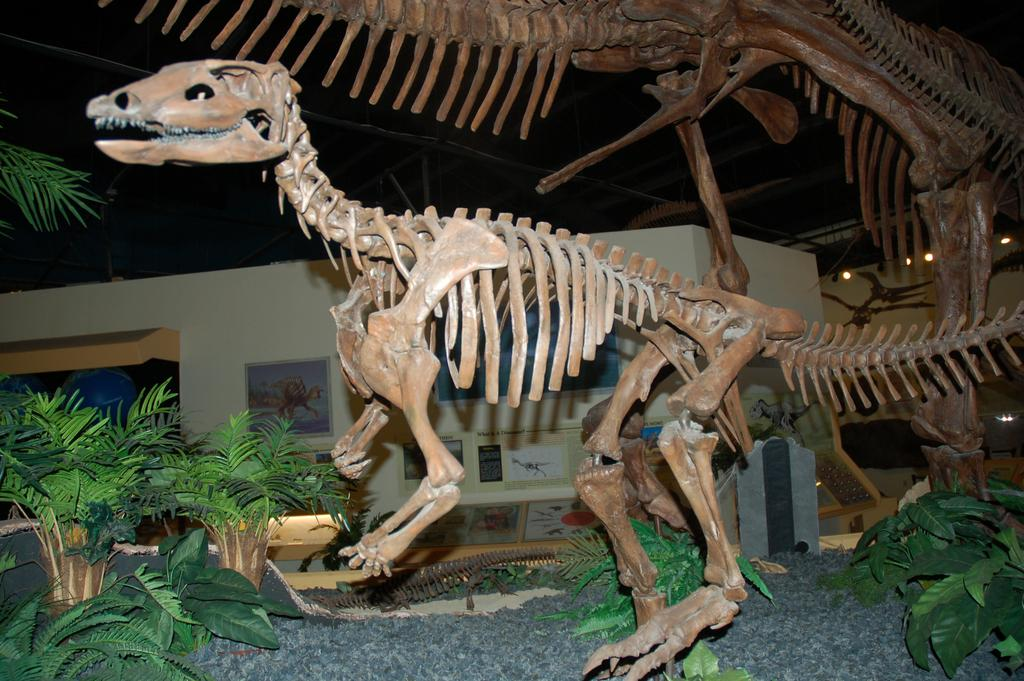
Mount restored with modern skull and posture

- Thescelosauridae
  - Orodrominae
    - Zephyrosaurus
    - - - Oryctodromeus
        - Orodromeus
      - - Koreanosaurus
        - Albertadromeus
  - Thescelosaurinae
    - Yueosaurus
    - - Changmiania
      - - - Haya griva
          - RTMP 2008.045.0002
        - - - Jeholosaurus
            - Changchunsaurus
          - - Parksosaurus
            - Thescelosaurus
              - CMN 8537 (T. edmontonensis)
              - - T. neglectus
                - T. garbanii
                - T. assiniboiensis

The earliest-known thescelosaurids, Changchunsaurus and Zephyrosaurus, are from the middle Cretaceous, roughly 40 million years younger than when the group would have evolved, suggesting a long ghost lineage (a period of geologic time during which a group existed but left no fossil evidence). In 2024, André Fonseca and colleagues recovered the Late Jurassic Nanosaurus as the earliest thescelosaurid, which would shorten the ghost lineage. Boyd concluded in 2015 that the split between Orodrominae and Thescelosaurinae took place in North America by the Aptian stage, with Orodrominae diversifying within North America. Thescelosaurinae might have diversified either in North America or Asia; the genus Fona, described in 2024, suggests that Thescelosaurinae was already established in North America at the beginning of the Late Cretaceous.

== Paleobiology ==
Like other ornithischians, Thescelosaurus was probably herbivorous. The different types of teeth, as well as the narrow snout, suggest that it was a selective feeder. The contemporary pachycephalosaur Stegoceras, in contrast, was probably a more indiscriminate feeder, allowing both animals to share the same environment without competing for food (niche partitioning). One specimen is known to have had a bone pathology, with the long bones of the right foot fused at their tops.

=== Posture and locomotion ===
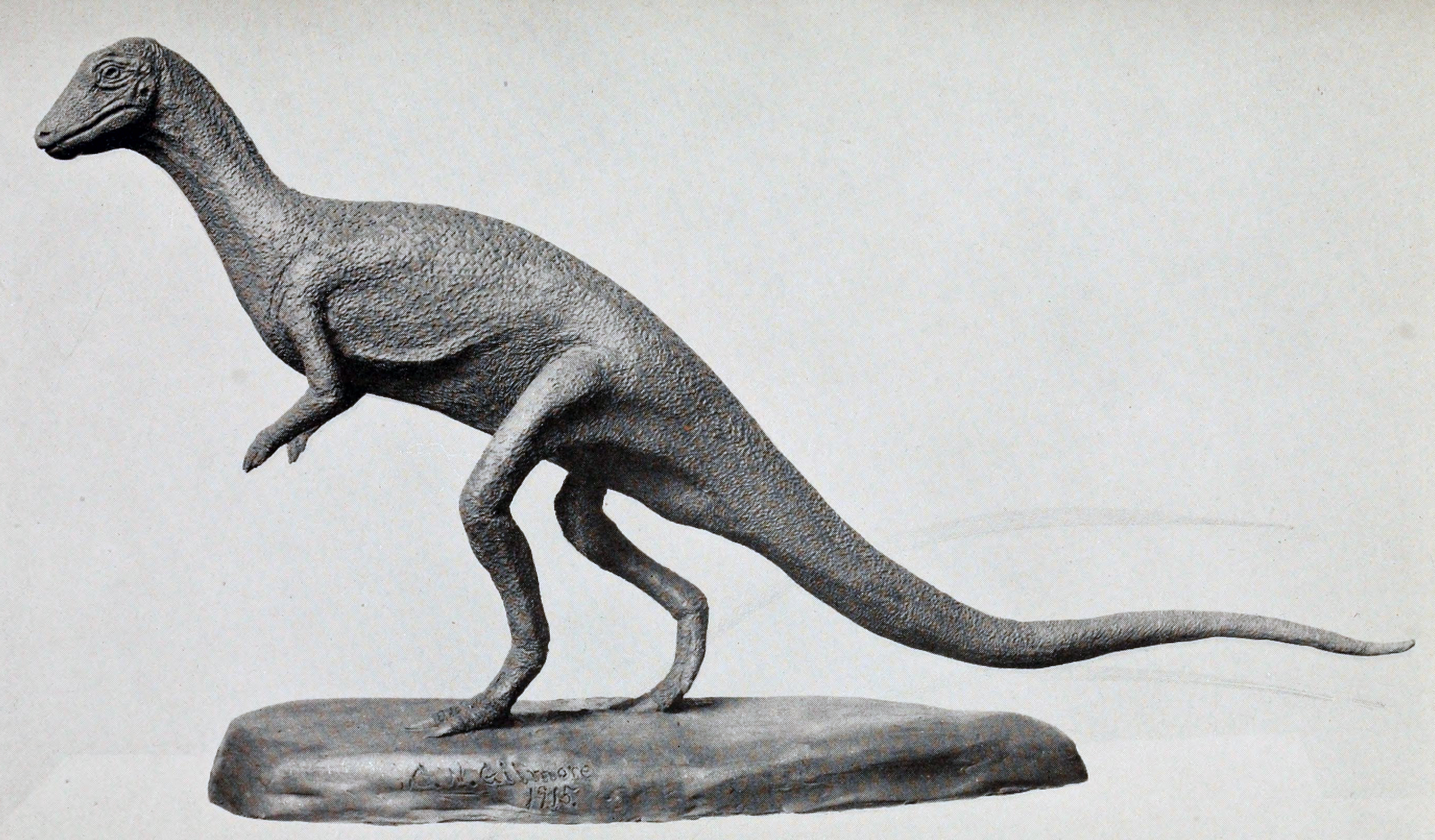
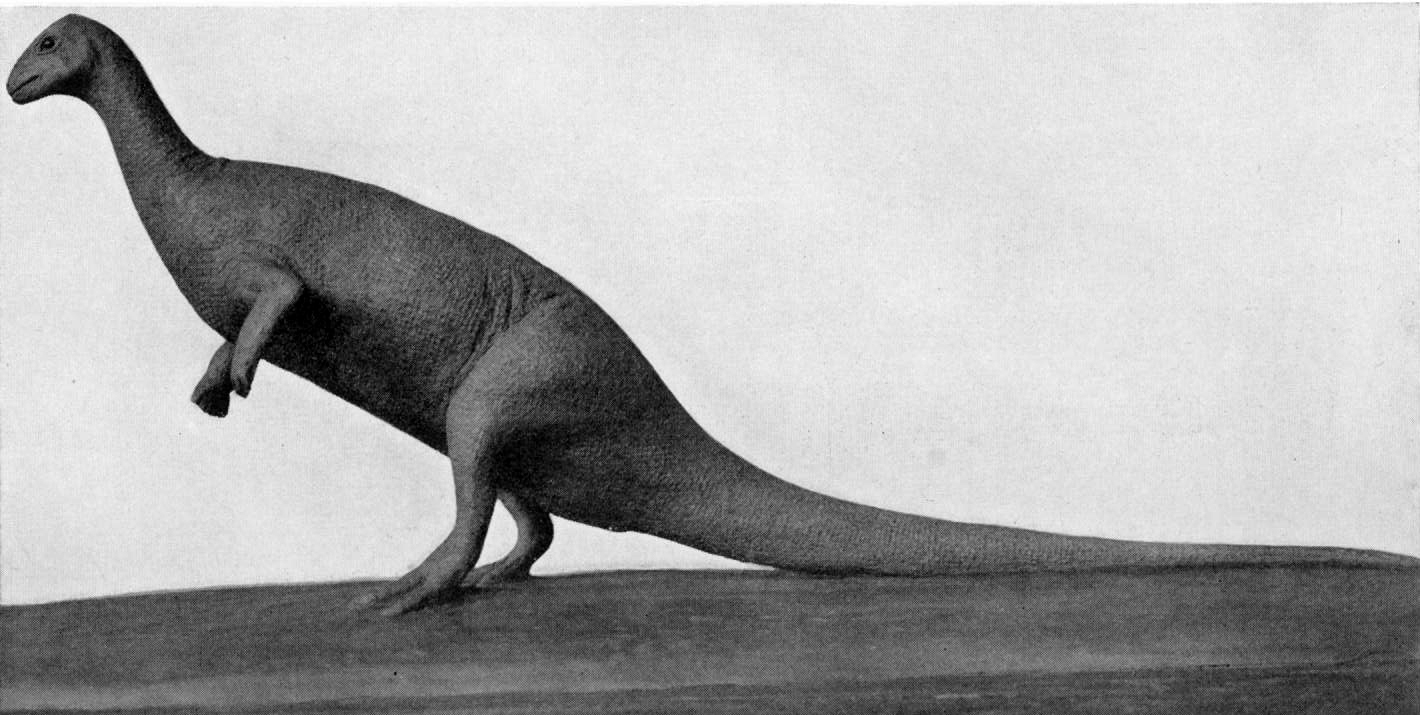
Gilmore's 1915 agile T. neglectus model (left), and Charles M. Sternberg's 1940 muscular T. edmontonensis model

In his 1915 description, Gilmore suggested that Thescelosaurus was an agile, bipedal (two-legged) animal and was adapted for running. He also created a model to depict its life appearance, showing a light and agile body built with slender hind limbs. These ideas were contested by Sternberg in 1940, who argued that the skeleton, and especially the limbs, were robust. His own model, of the species T. edmontonensis, consequently showed limbs that were much more muscular. Other subsequent studies disagreed with Gilmore idea of a proficient runner given the robust skeleton, the proportionally long femur, and the short lower leg bones. Galton, in 1974, even suggested that Thescelosaurus could have occasionally moved quadrupedally (on all fours), given its fairly long arms and wide hands. Phil Senter and Jared Mackey, in 2023, concluded that a quadrupedal posture would have been theoretically possible, as the spine of the back was bent down, allowing the hand to touch the ground even when the hind limbs were straight. However, in such a posture the fingers would have pointed towards the sides rather than front, and consequently could not have been used to propel the animal forward; quadrupedal locomotion therefore seems unlikely.

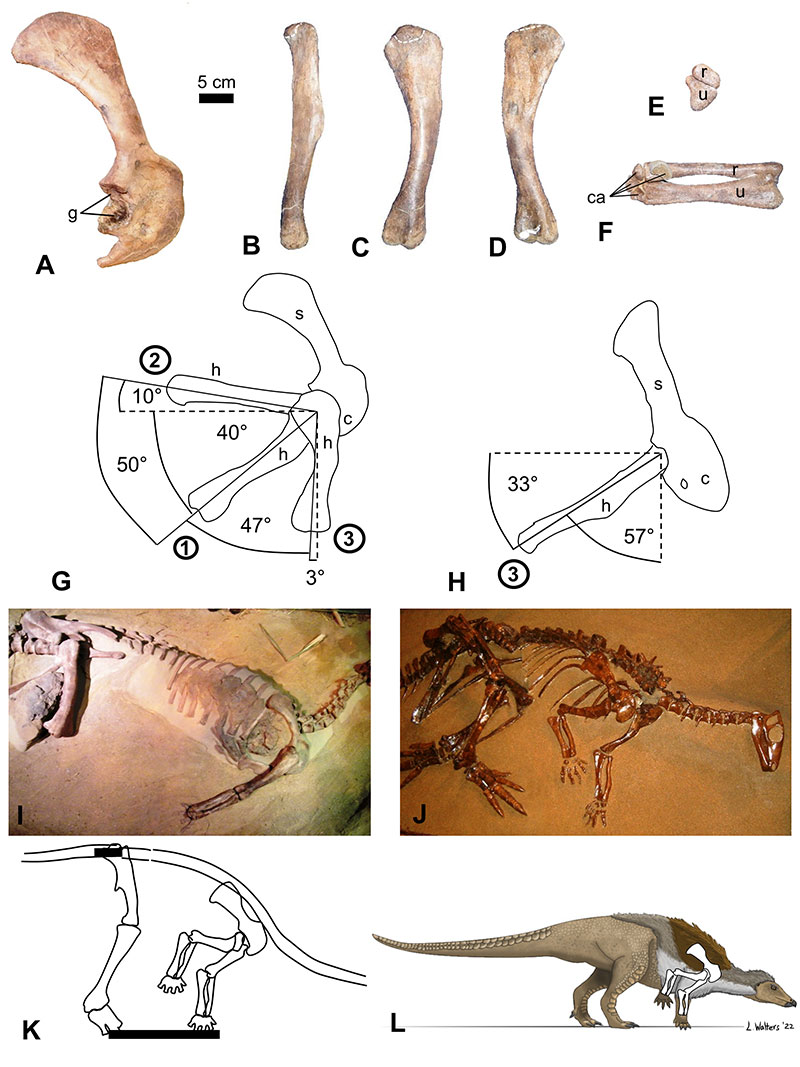
Right pectoral girdle and forelimb bones of "Willo" and motion at the shoulder. K and L show the theoretically possible but unlikely quadrupedal posture

A 2023 study by David Button and Lindsay Zanno concluded that Thescelosaurus was less adapted for running than other thescelosaurids but nonetheless showed two traits that are common in runners. The first of these is the fourth trochanter, a bony crest on the femur that anchored the main locomotory muscle. This crest was relatively proximal (closer to the upper end of the bone), allowing for faster movements at the expense of power. The second trait is found in the inner ear, which contains the three semicircular canals that house the sense of balance: one of these canals, the anterior semicircular canal, was greatly enlarged, suggesting acute balance sensitivity, which in turn might suggest high agility but could also be explained by possible burrowing behavior.

In Sternberg's 1940 model, the upper arm was horizontal and almost perpendicular to the body. Peter Galton pointed out in 1970 that the humerus (upper arm bone) of most ornithischians was articulated to the shoulder by an articular surface consisting of the entire end of the bone, rather than a distinct ball and socket as in mammals, and that the humerus would not have spread sidewards as in Sternberg's model. Senter and Mackey found that the humerus could swing forward to a vertical position, but not much beyond that point.

The semicircular canals may allow for reconstructing the habitual posture of the head. In modern animals, one of the canals, the lateral semicircular canal, is typically horizontal when the head is in an "alert" posture. Button and Zanno argued that the head of Thescelosaurus would be slightly up-tilted when oriented such that the canal is horizontal. This is similar to Dysalotosaurus, but contrasts with the down-tilted alert postures hypothesized for many other ornithischians including ceratopsians, ankylosaurs, and hadrosaurs.

=== Function of intercostal plates ===
The function of the plates at the side of the rib cage remains unclear. Such plates are known from several other ornithischians, and it was originally suggested that they were osteoderms (armor) for defence against predators. This hypothesis has been refuted, as both their outer and inner surfaces show Sharpey's fibres, indicating the insertion of tendons – consequently, the plates must have been completely embedded within the musculature. Furthermore, analysis of thin sections of the plates of Thescelosaurus, Hypsilophodon, and Talenkauen showed that the plates started as cartilage and became bone as the animal aged (endochondral ossification), which is not the case with osteoderms (which are intramembranous ossifications). Instead, the plates may have played a role in breathing, or simply made the thoracic cavity more rigid. The plates appear to be absent in smaller Thescelosaurus specimens, suggesting that they ossified only later in life.

=== Senses, sociality, and possible burrowing behavior ===
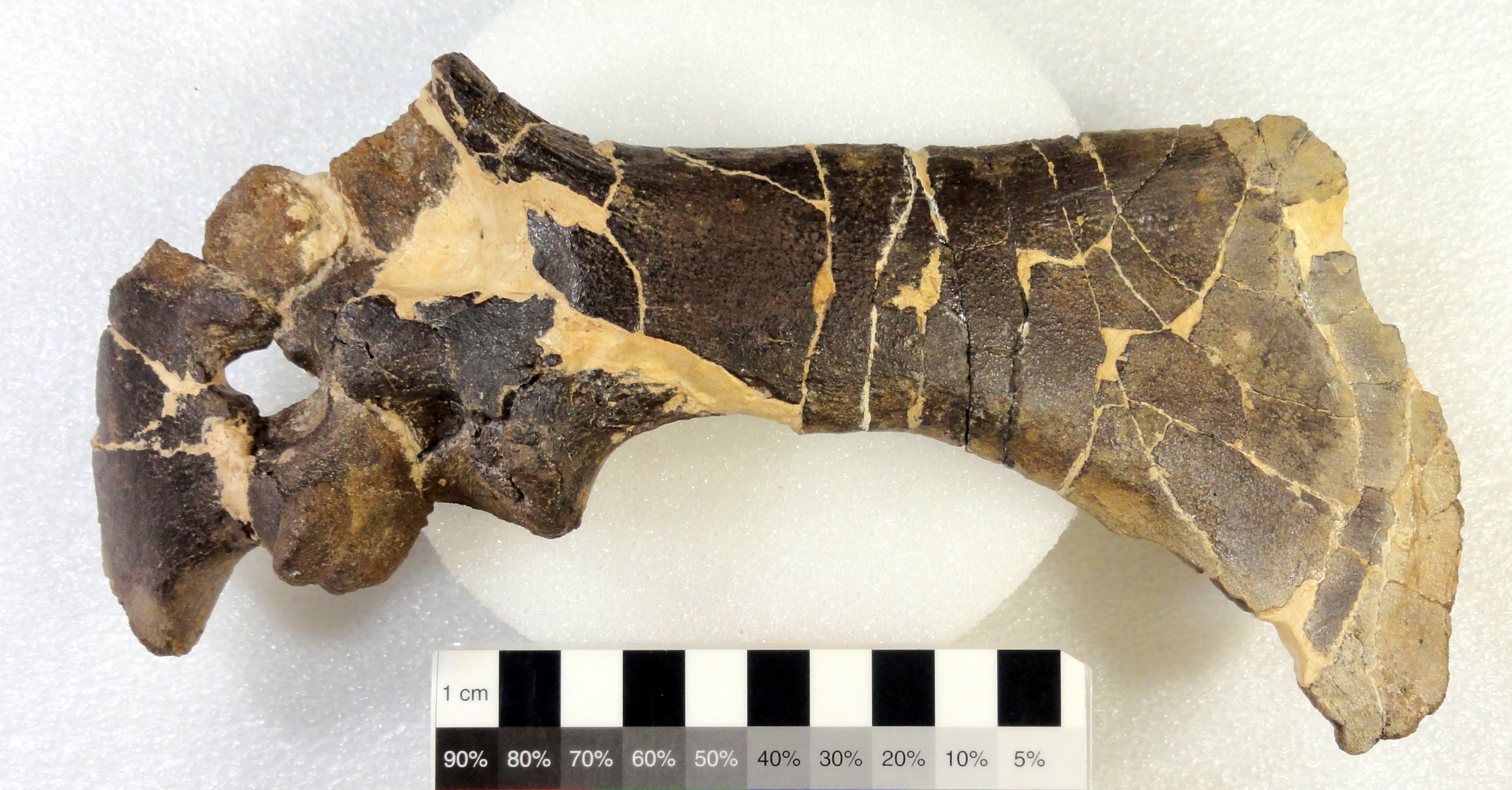
The broad shoulder blade is possibly an adaptation for burrowing behavior

Button and Zanno, in 2023, discussed the sensory and cognitive abilities of Thescelosaurus based on a CT scan of the skull of the "Willo" specimen. Even though the brain itself is not preserved, the skull vault that contained the brain, the endocast, can be studied. Overall, the brain was small compared to most other neornithischian dinosaurs, but similar in size to that of ceratopsids such as Triceratops. Its cognitive abilities were therefore likely within the range of modern reptiles. These limited cognitive abilities might suggest that social interactions were comparatively simple, or that it lived in smaller groups. In localities of the related Oryctodromeus, two to three individuals are usually found together, which could reflect the group size typical for that genus. Thescelosaurus might also have lived in such small groups, although Button and Zanno cautioned that the evidence for such claims remains weak.

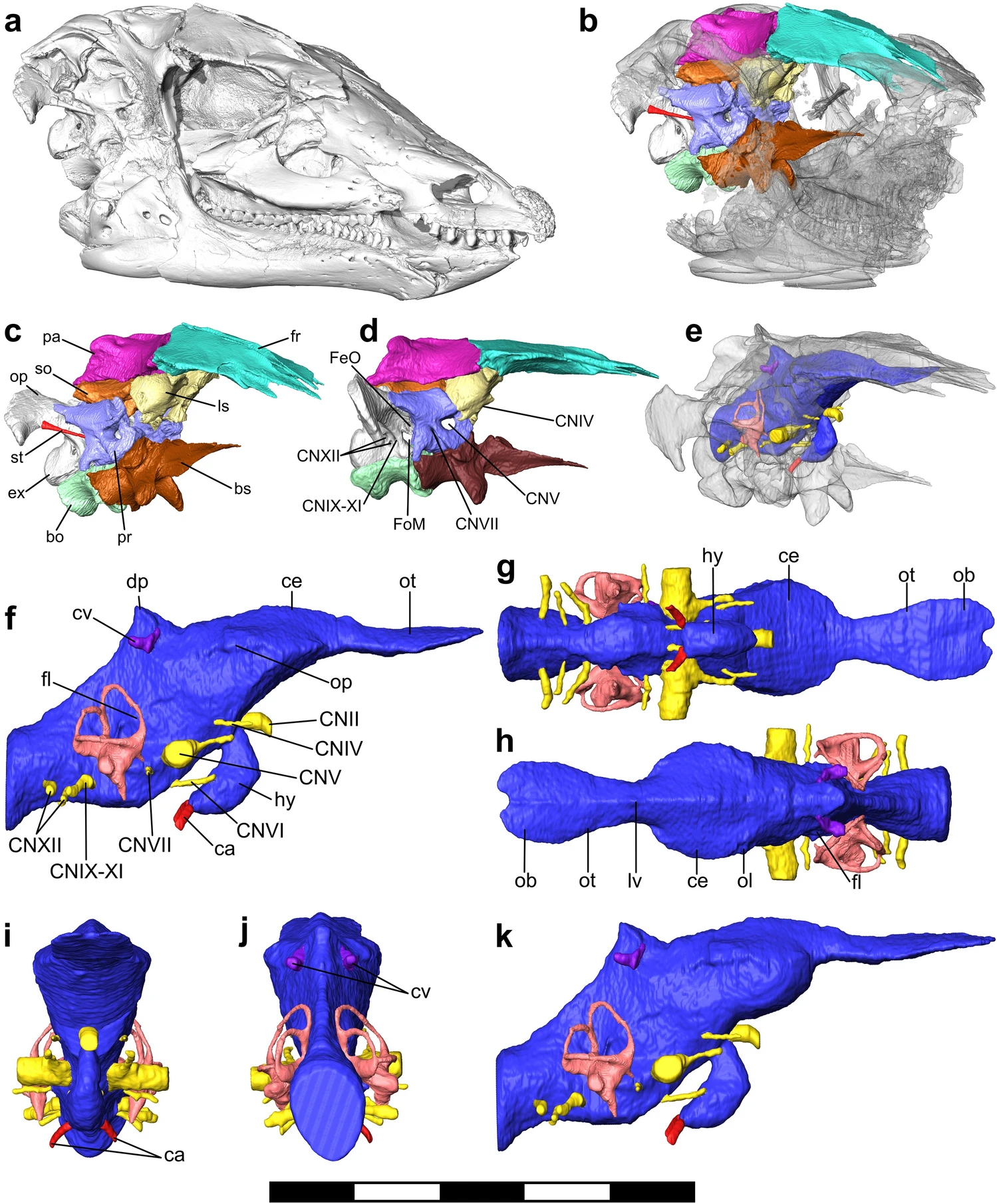
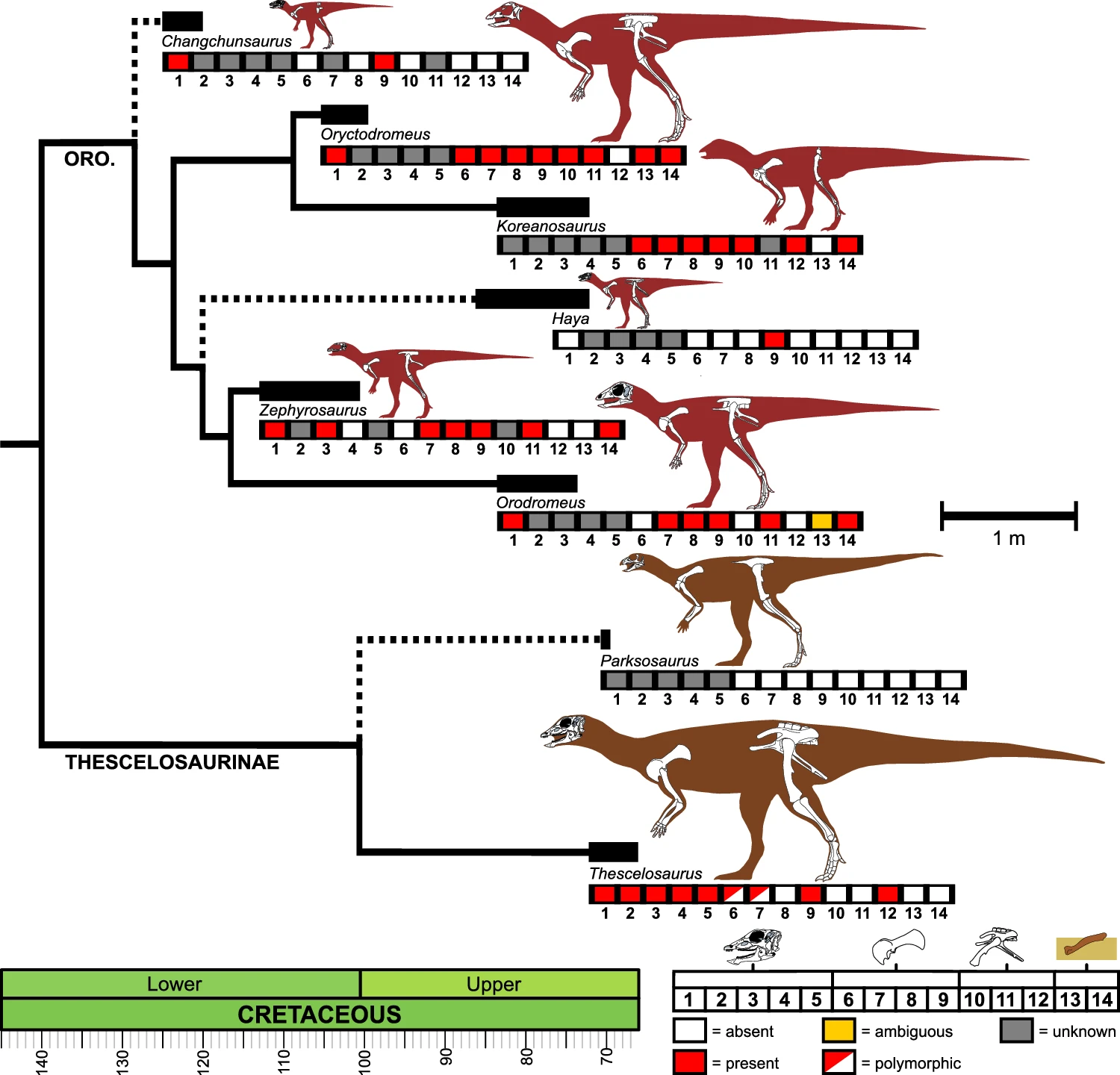
Reconstructed skull and endocast of "Willo" (left) and distribution of characters associated with burrowing behavior within Thescelosauridae (right)

It had poor hearing, with an estimated best hearing range between around 296 and 2150 Hz, which is narrower than that of related genera such as Dysalotosaurus. The sense of smell, in contrast, was acute, as indicated by the large olfactory bulbs of the brain, which are around 3% of the entire volume of the endocast. This is comparable to modern rodents and lagomorphs and more than in birds. Poor hearing and an acute sense of smell are commonly found in modern animals that create burrows, leading Button and Zanno to suggest that Thescelosaurus may have been semi-fossorial. The animal might have dug for food such as roots and tubers, which can be detected by smelling. Some anatomical features of the skeleton could also be related to digging, such as the robust forelimbs and the premaxillae that were fused together towards their tips, reinforcing the tip of the snout to aid in digging. Furthermore, the shoulder blade was broad, possibly to provide a larger attachment surface for muscles important for scratch-digging. The relatively large size of Thescelosaurus does not necessarily preclude burrowing behaviour, as tunnels have been associated with the only slightly smaller Oryctrodromeus and with much larger mammals.

Button and Zanno alternatively suggested that Thescelosaurus could have inherited its burrowing adaptations from burrowing ancestors, while not burrowing itself. This idea is supported by the lack of some of the burrowing adaptations seen in the closely related Oryctodromeus. Burrowing might have been widespread in thescelosaurids and other basal neornithischians.

=== Supposed fossilized heart ===
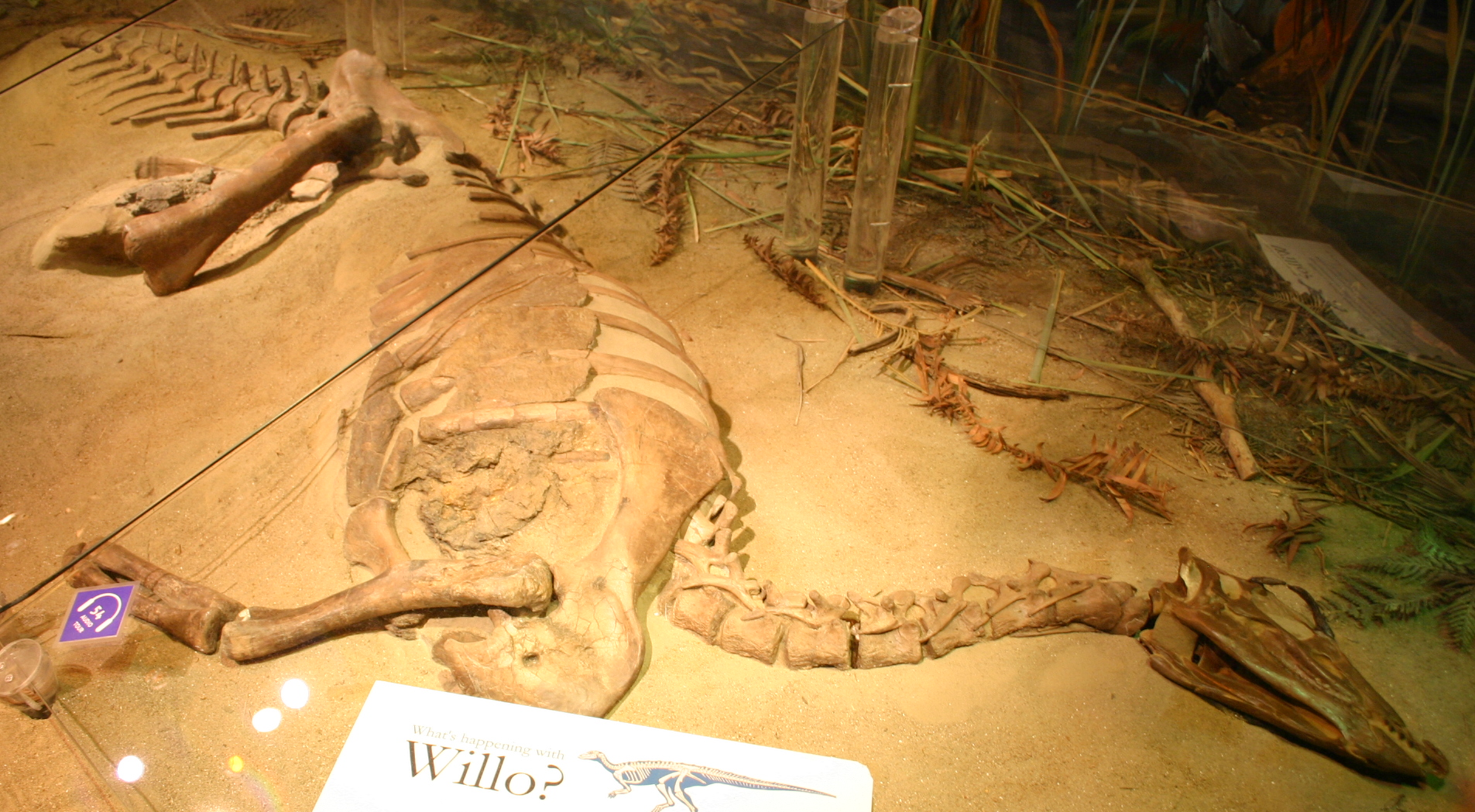
"Willo" specimen, with the possible heart left of the shoulder blade

In 2000, the imaging specialist Paul Fisher and colleagues interpreted a concretion in the chest region of the "Willo" specimen as the remnant of a heart. The internal structure of the concretion was revealed using CT scans, showing three low-density areas that the researchers interpreted as the left and right ventricles and the aorta. They suggested that the heart had been saponified (turned to grave wax) under airless burial conditions, and then changed to goethite, an iron mineral, by replacement of the original material, forming a concretion that reflects the original shape of the heart. The two supposed ventricles and the single aorta are consistent with a four-chambered heart as found in modern birds and mammals, suggesting an elevated metabolic rate for Thescelosaurus. Following this discovery, "Willo" became widely known in the public as the "Dinosaur with a heart of stone".

In 2001, Timothy Rowe and colleagues commented that the anatomy of the object is inconsistent with a heart – for example, the supposed heart partially engulfs one of the ribs and has an internal structure of concentric layers in some places. Instead, they suggested that the structure is an ironstone concretion; such concretions are common in similar sediments, and another concretion is preserved behind the right leg. The original authors defended their position, arguing that the concretion is unique and has formed around the actual heart.

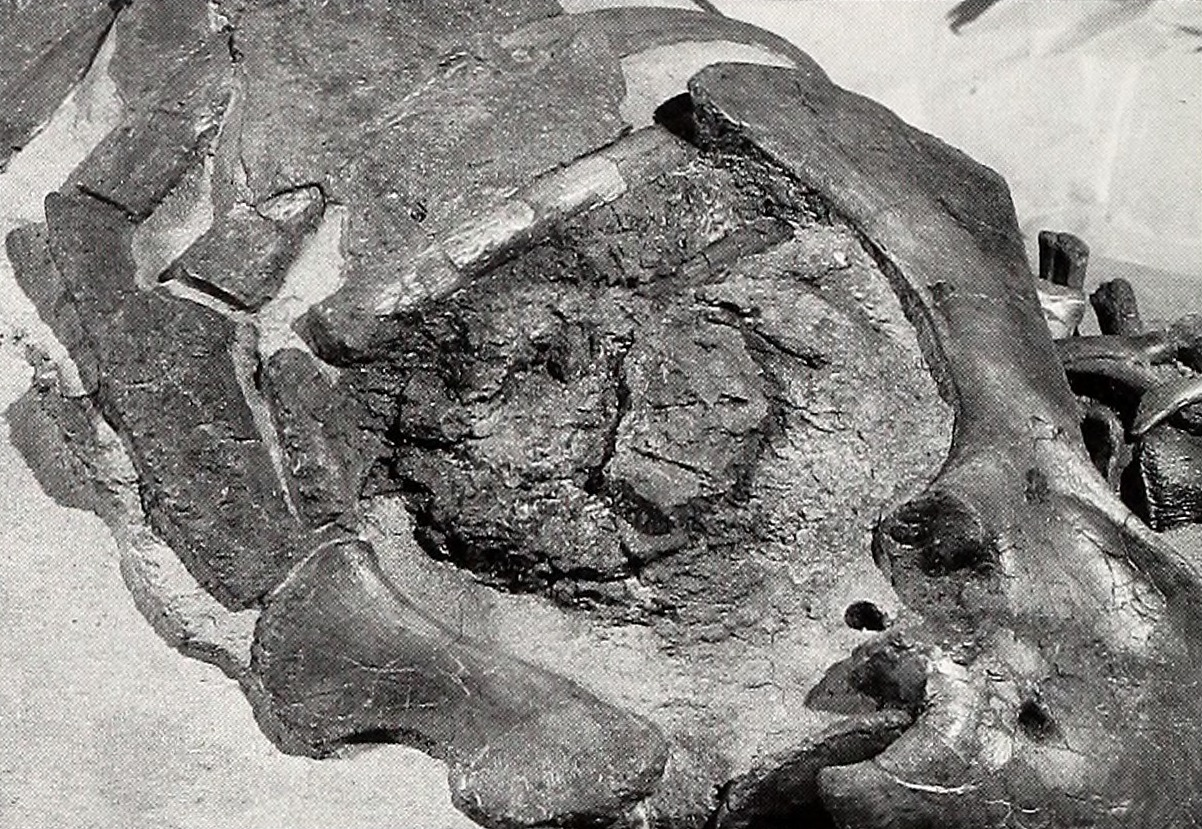
"Willo"'s supposed "heart"

In 2011, researchers supervised by Mary Schweitzer applied multiple lines of inquiry to the question of the object's identity, including more advanced CT scanning, histology, X-ray diffraction, X-ray photoelectron spectroscopy, and scanning electron microscopy. The team found that the object's internal structure does not include chambers but is made up of three unconnected areas of lower density material, and is not comparable to the structure of an ostrich's heart. The "walls" are composed of sedimentary minerals not known to be produced in biological systems, such as goethite, feldspar minerals, quartz, and gypsum, as well as some plant fragments. Carbon, nitrogen, and phosphorus, chemical elements important to life, were lacking in their samples, and cardiac cellular structures were absent. There was one possible patch with animal cellular structures. The authors found their data supported identification as a geologic concretion, not the heart, with the possibility that isolated areas of tissues were preserved.

== Paleoecology ==
=== Temporal and geographic range ===
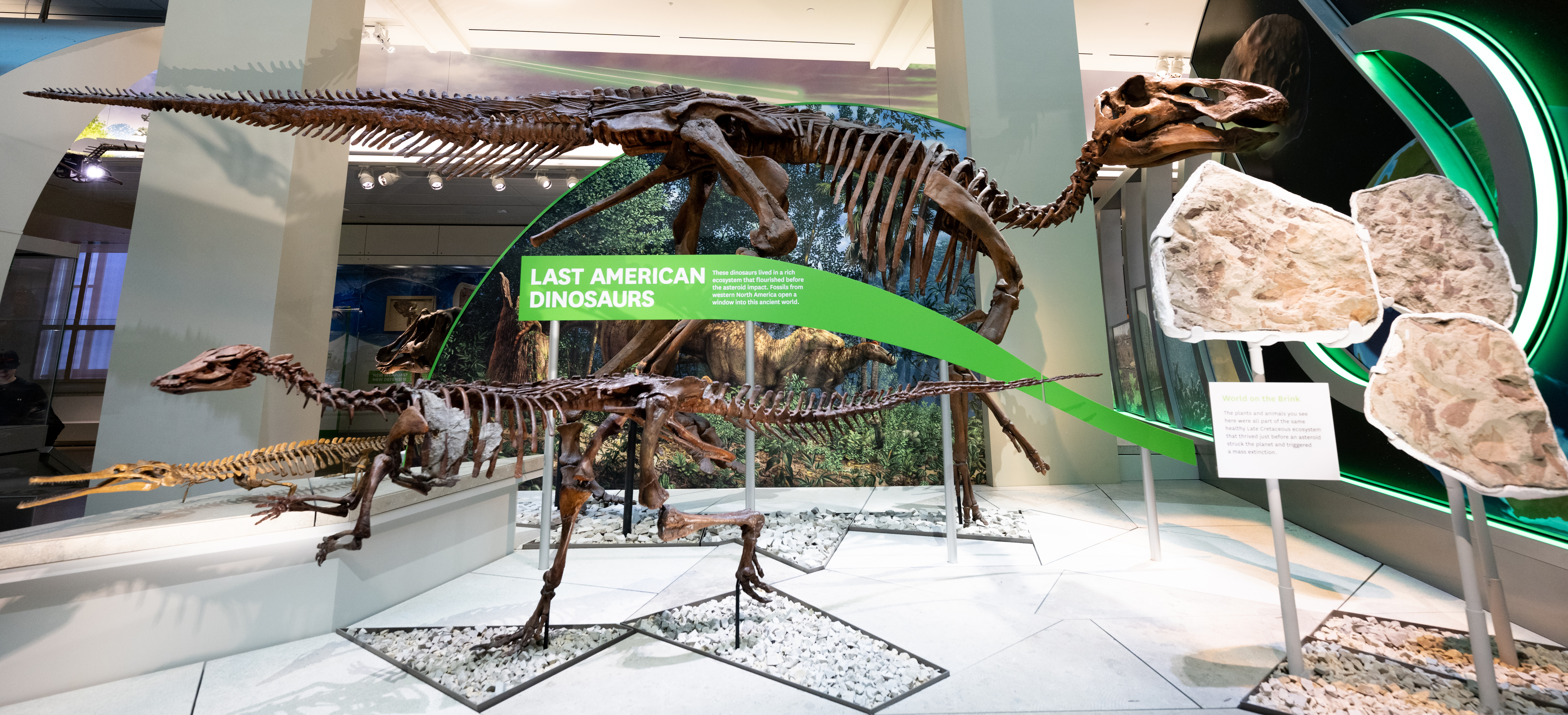
Thescelosaurus and other animals and plants that coexisted in North America at the end of the Cretaceous, Smithsonian

Thescelosaurus is definitively known only from deposits in western North America dating to the late Maastrichtian age, just before the Cretaceous-Paleogene Extinction Event 66.04 million years ago. T. neglectus is known from the Lance Formation of Wyoming and the Hell Creek Formation of South Dakota, T. garbanii is known from the Hell Creek Formation of Montana, and T. assiniboiensis is known from the Frenchman Formation of Saskatchewan. An additional definitive Thescelosaurus specimen that cannot be assigned to a diagnostic species, the type of T. edmontonensis, is known from the Scollard Formation of Alberta. The deposition of the Lance Formation began 69.42 million years ago; the deposition of the Scollard and Frenchman formations began 66.88 million years ago; and the deposition of the Hell Creek Formation began at least 67.2 million years ago. Equivocal material of Thescelosaurus has also been reported from the Horseshoe Canyon Formation of Alberta, the Hell Creek Formation of North Dakota, the Laramie Formation of Colorado, the Ferris, Medicine Bow, and Almond Formations of Wyoming, the Willow Creek Formation of Montana, and the Prince Creek Formation of Alaska. All of these localities are of similar late Maastrichtian age to those bearing clear Thescelosaurus material, except the Horseshoe Canyon and Prince Creek Formations. The presence of Thescelosaurus in those would extend the known range of the genus into the middle or early Maastrichtian, but they have since been reassigned as probable Parksosaurus specimens.

=== Abundance ===
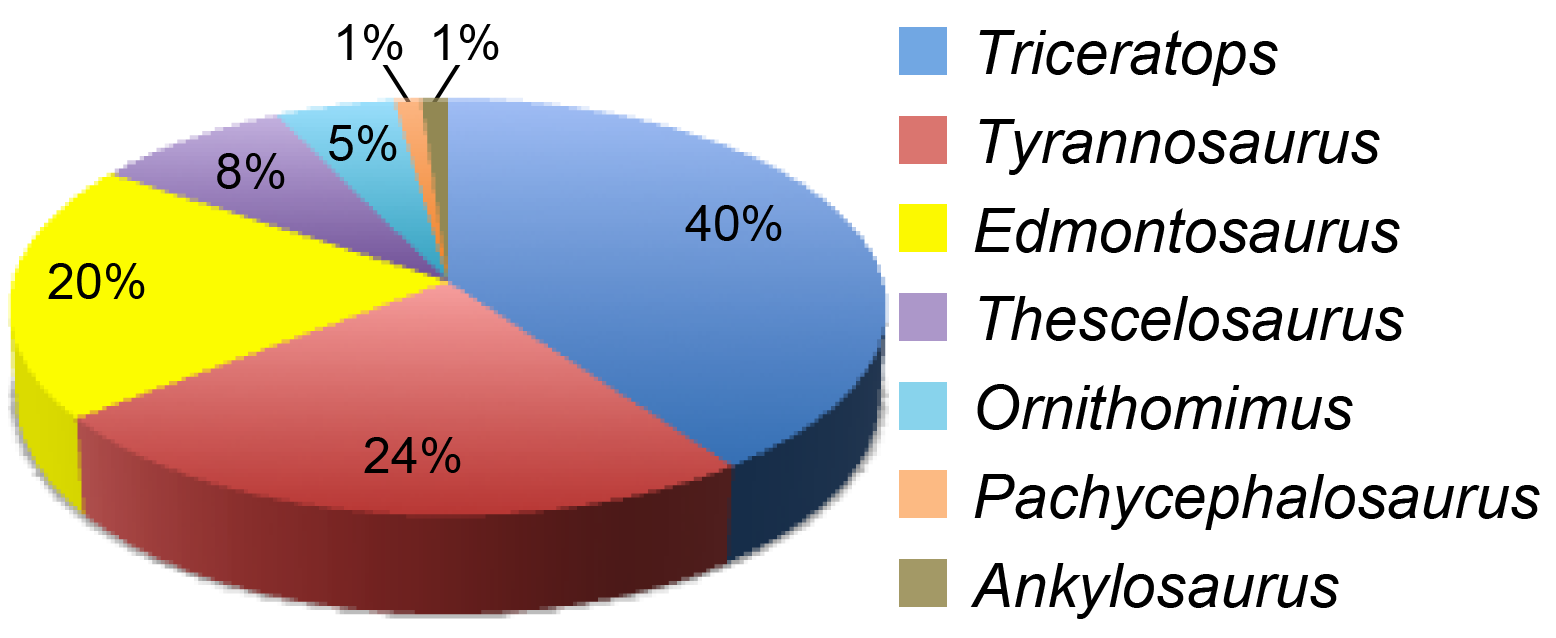
Pie chart of the time averaged census for large-bodied dinosaurs from one section of the Hell Creek Formation according to a 2011 study

Thescelosaurus was historically thought to be relatively uncommon in its paleoenvironments. A 1987 study estimated that hypsilophodontids (including Thescelosaurus) and pachycephalosaurs together accounted for just 2% of the dinosaur faunas of the Lance, Hell Creek, and Frenchman formations. Two other studies, of 1998 and 2011, estimated that Thescelosaurus made up 3% and 5% of the total dinosaur fauna of the Hell Creek Formation, respectively. These low figures might be the result of a sampling bias, as specimens of more spectacular dinosaurs such as Triceratops were preferentially collected, and Thescelosaurus is now thought to be one of the more abundant dinosaurs. A 2011 census study of an area of the Hell Creek Formation where fossils have been collected without such bias estimated that Thescelosaurus forms 8% of the dinosaur fauna. Brown and colleagues, in 2011, estimated that Thescelosaurus was perhaps the most abundant dinosaur in the Frenchman Formation, accounting for 31% of specimens. At one site in the Hell Creek Formation known as the "tooth draw deposit", Thescelosaurus accounted for 22.7% of all dinosaur bones. At the 'convenience store' locality of the Frenchman Formation, Thescelosaurus even accounted for 42% of all tetrapod fossils; all Thescelosaurus specimens from this locality are very small and presumably juvenile. The most common Thescelosaurus fossils that can be readily identified are the phalanges of the foot, while articulated skeletons are very rare.

=== Paleoenvironment ===
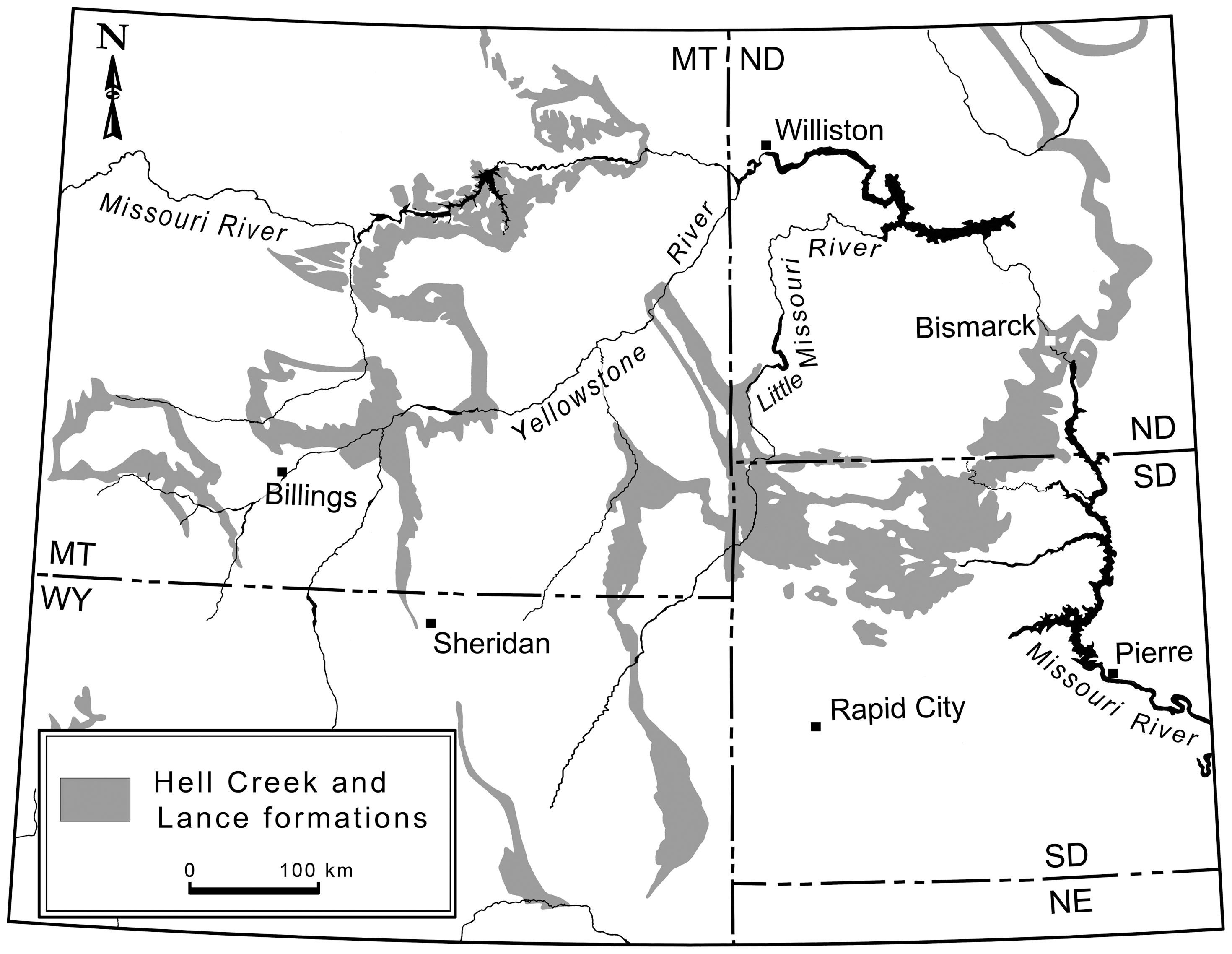
Map of the Hell Creek and Lance formations of North America, where Thescelosaurus has been found

Paleoenvironments of the Scollard and Hell Creek formation show that the very end of the Cretaceous was intermediate between semi-arid and humid, with both formations showing braided streams and floodplains and meandering river channels, that shifted to become more humid following the Cretaceous-Paleogene extinction event. The formations where Thescelosaurus fossils have been found represent different sections of the western shore of the Western Interior Seaway dividing western and eastern North America during the Cretaceous, a broad coastal plain extending westward from the seaway to the newly formed Rocky Mountains. These formations are composed largely of sandstone and mudstone, which have been attributed to floodplain environments. While slightly older floras were dominated by cycad-palm-fern meadows, the Hell Creek was dominated by angiosperms in a forested landscape of small trees. The floral assemblages of the Frenchman Formation show that southern Saskatchewan was a subtropical to warm temperate environment, with seasons and an average mean temperature of 54–57 °F (12–14 °C). The paleoenvironment would have been a swampy to lowland forest with a tree canopy of conifers and a diverse angiosperm-dominated mid-canopy and understory. There is also evidence of wildfires, with one site preserving a mature forest and another preserving a forest recovering from a fire.

The disproportional presence of Thescelosaurus and hadrosaurs in sandstone, versus ceratopsians in mudstone, could suggest that Thescelosaurus preferred the habitat along channel margins rather than floodplains, but the possible presence in the Laramie Formation would imply Thescelosaurus preferred a low coastal environment. Alternatively, these supposed habitat preferences may simply be a result of Thescelosaurus fossils being more readily preserved in some environments than in others. Thescelosaurus would have inhabited an ecomorphospace different from that of other dinosaurs including the similarly sized and built pachycephalosaurids.

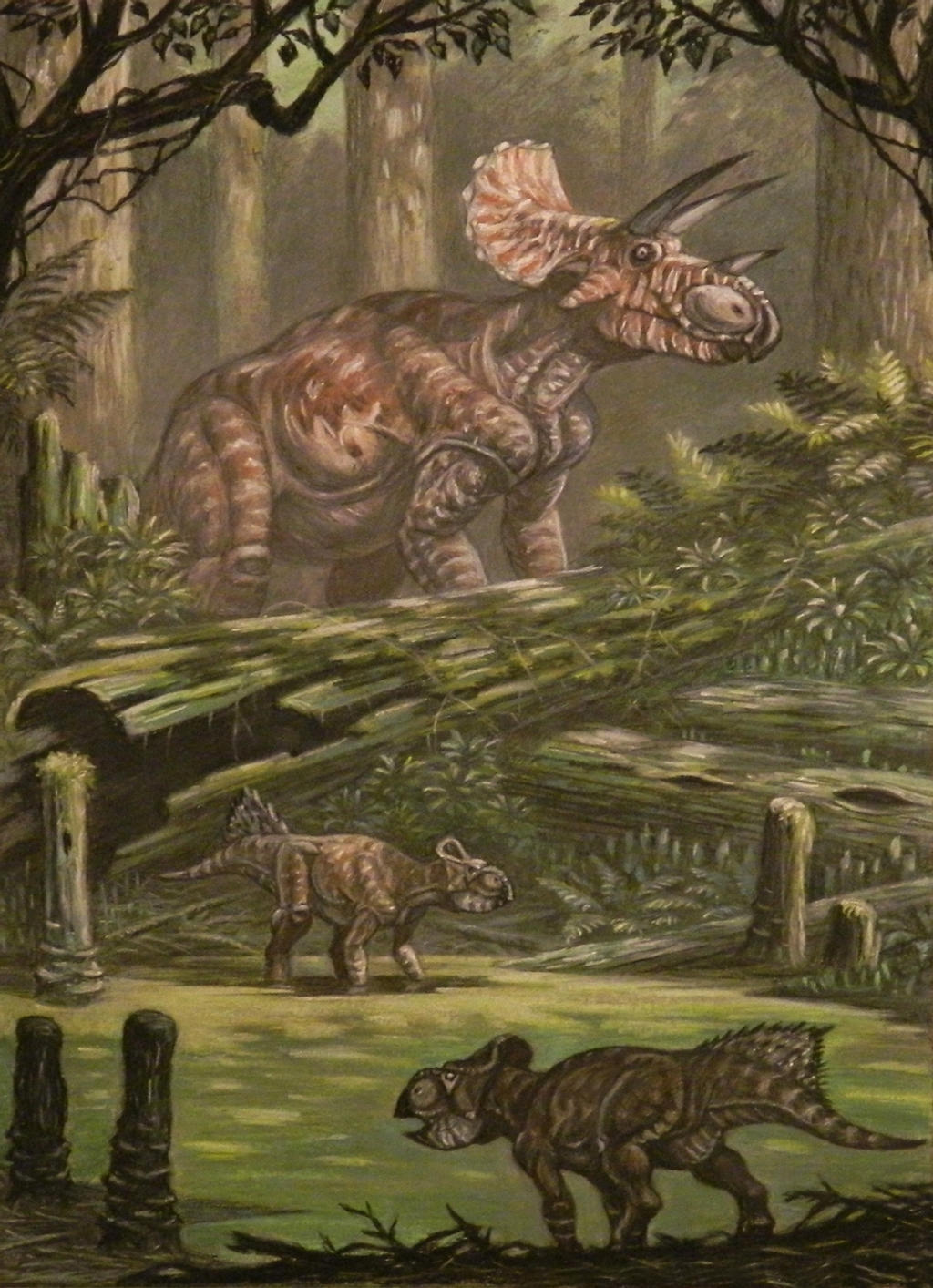
Triceratops and Leptoceratops, ceratopsian dinosaurs known from the Hell Creek Formation

Many fossil vertebrates are found in the Scollard Formation alongside Thescelosaurus, including Chondrichthyes and Osteichthyes such as Palaeospinax, Myledaphus, Lepisosteus and Cyclurus, amphibians like Scapherpeton, turtles including Compsemys, indeterminate champsosaurs, crocodilians, pterosaurs and birds, a variety of theropod groups including troodontids, ornithomimids, the tyrannosaurid Tyrannosaurus, and ornithischians including Leptoceratops, pachycephalosaurids, Triceratops and Ankylosaurus. Mammals are also very diverse, with multituberculates, deltatheridiids, the marsupials Alphadon, Pediomys, Didelphodon and Eodelphis, and the insectivorans Gypsonictops, Cimolestes and Batodon. Within the Hell Creek Formation of Montana, Thescelosaurus lived alongside dinosaurs including Leptoceratops, pachycephalosaurids Pachycephalosaurus, Stygimoloch and Sphaerotholus, the hadrosaurid Edmontosaurus, ceratopsians like Triceratops and Torosaurus, the nodosaurid Edmontonia and ankylosaurid Ankylosaurus, multiple dromaeosaurids and troodontids, the ornithomimid Ornithomimus, the caenagnathid Elmisaurus, tyrannosaurids including Tyrannosaurus, an alvarezsaurid, and the bird Avisaurus. The dinosaur fauna of the Frenchman Formation is similar, with the presence of pachycephalosaurids, Edmontosaurus, Triceratops, Torosaurus, ankylosaurids, dromaeosaurids, troodontids, ornithomimids, caenagnathids, and Tyrannosaurus, as well as the intermediate theropod Richardoestesia.

The Lance Formation contains one of the best known faunas from the Late Cretaceous, with a diverse assemblage of cartilaginous and bony fishes, frogs, salamanders, turtles, champsosaurs, lizards, snakes, crocodilians, pterosaurs, mammals, and birds such as Potamornis and Palintropus. The dinosaurs of the Lance Formation include troodontids such as Pectinodon and Paronychodon, dromaeosaurids, the ornithomimid Ornithomimus, the caenagnathid Chirostenotes, the tyrannosaurid Tyrannosaurus, the pachycephalosaurids Pachycephalosaurus and Stygimoloch, the hadrosaurid Edmontosaurus, ankylosaurs such as Edmontonia and Ankylosaurus, and ceratopsians such as Leptoceratops, Triceratops, and Torosaurus. Small tyrannosaurids, large dromaeosaurids and other second tier predators likely targeted Thescelosaurus and other smaller ornithischians and theropods, with very young ornithischians also preyed on by smaller dromaeosaurids and troodontids, with crocodilians, lizards and mammals as opportunistic lower trophic level hunters and scavengers.
