= List of Dinosaur Train episodes =

This is a list of Dinosaur Train episodes. In 2025, the Jim Henson Company announced that a revival of the series was in the works. The release date for the revival has not yet been released as of 2026.

== Series overview ==
Season	Segments	Episodes	Originally aired	
Season	Segments	Episodes	First aired	Last aired
1	80	40	September 7, 2009	May 6, 2011
2	52	26	August 22, 2011	February 22, 2013
3	26	13	January 20, 2014	June 15, 2015
4	20	10	December 7, 2015	February 20, 2017
5	19	11	August 26, 2019	June 15, 2020
Film			April 12, 2021	

== Episodes ==
=== Season 1 (2009–11) ===
No. overall	No. in season	Title	Written by	Lessons Taught	Original release date	Stations visited (Time period)
1	1	"Valley of the Stygimolochs"	Craig Bartlett	Stygimoloch	September 7, 2009	"Valley of Stygimolochs Station" (Cretaceous Time period)
1	1	"Tiny Loves Fish"	Craig Bartlett	Pteranodon	September 7, 2009	"The Big Pond Station" (Cretaceous Time period)
2	2	"The Call of the Wild Corythosaurus"	Joe Purdy	Corythosaurus Lambeosaurine crests	September 8, 2009	"Corythosaurus Canyon Station" (Cretaceous Time period)
2	2	"Triceratops for Lunch"	Elise Allen	Triceratops	September 8, 2009	"Pteranodon Terrace Station" (Cretaceous Time period), "The Big Pond Station" (Cretaceous Time period)
3	3	"Beating the Heat"	Craig Bartlett	Stegosaurus	September 9, 2009	"Stegosaurus Forest Station" (Jurassic Time period)
3	3	"Flowers for Mom"	Joe Purdy	Bees	September 9, 2009	"The Big Pond Station" (Cretaceous Time period)
4	4	"I'm a T. Rex!"	Craig Bartlett	Tyrannosaurus	September 10, 2009	"Rexville Station" (Cretaceous Time period)
4	4	"Ned the Quadruped"	Bradley Zweig	Brachiosaurus	September 10, 2009	"Brachiosaurus Garden Station" (Jurassic Time period)
5	5	"One Smart Dinosaur"	Craig Bartlett	Troodon	September 11, 2009	"Troodon Town Station" (Cretaceous Time period)
5	5	"Petey the Peteinosaurus"	Jon Greenberg	Peteinosaurus	September 11, 2009	"Peteinosaurus Place Station" (Triassic Time period)
6	6	"Fast Friends"	Corey Powell	Ornithomimus	September 17, 2009	"Ornithomimus Corner Station" (Cretaceous Time period)
6	6	"T. Rex Teeth"	Craig Bartlett	Tyrannosaurus teeth	September 17, 2009	"Rexville Station" (Cretaceous Time period)
7	7	"Now with Feathers!"	Joe Ansolabehere	Velociraptor; Feathered dinosaurs	September 18, 2009	"Velociraptor Valley Station" (Cretaceous Time period)
7	7	"A Frill a Minute"	Elise Allen	Triceratops defenses	September 18, 2009	"The Big Pond Station" (Cretaceous Time period)
After Mr. P. finds a feather on the train, Mrs. P., Tiny, and Buddy search for clues to find the dinosaur it came from. Mrs. P. and the kids meet Tank Triceratops and his mom on the train for a play date at the Big Pond, and they learn why Triceratops have a frill.
8	8	"One Big Dinosaur"	Joe Purdy	Argentinosaurus	September 21, 2009	"Argentinosaurus Plains Station" (Cretaceous Time period)
8	8	"Play Date with Annie"	Craig Bartlett	Tyrannosaurus senses	September 21, 2009	"Pteranodon Terrace Station" (Cretaceous Time period)
Mrs Pteranodon takes Buddy and Tiny to visit Argentinosaurus, some of the biggest land creatures ever! They find out there are great things about being really big, and that it's also great being their own size. Buddy is excited that Annie is coming soon to play at the Pteranodon nest, but Tiny feels left out. Can Buddy and Annie convince her that she can play with them too?
9	9	"Armored Like an Ankylosaurus"	Mark Drop	Ankylosaurus	September 22, 2009	"Ankylosaurus Acres Station" (Cretaceous Time period)
9	9	"Campout!"	Jon Greenberg	Palaeobatrachus, amphibians	September 22, 2009	"The Big Pond Station" (Cretaceous Time period)
Mr. P. takes the kids to a dinoball game, featuring his favorite player Hank Ankylosaurus. The Pteranadon family goes to the Big Pond for an overnight campout and meet Patricia Palaeobatrachus.
10	10	"Laura the Giganotosaurus"	Craig Bartlett	Giganotosaurus, observation	September 29, 2009	"Pteranodon Terrace Station" (Cretaceous Time period), "Troodon Town Station" (Cretaceous Time period)
10	10	"Dinosaur Poop!"	Elise Allen	Brachiosaurus, poop	September 29, 2009	"Brachiosaurus Gardens Station" (Jurassic Time period)
Tiny, Buddy, and Mrs. P. visit Laura Giganotosaurus on the train to ask for her help identifying a bird, and they meet Angela Avisaurus. Tiny, Buddy and Mrs. P. go to the Brachiosaurus Brunch to have lunch and play games with Ned and Ella Brachiosaurus.
11	11	"Derek the Deinonychus"	Joe Purdy	Deinonychus	September 30, 2009	"Deinonychus Depot Station" (Cretaceous Time period)
11	11	"Don's Dragonfly"	Joe Purdy	Dragonflies	September 30, 2009	"The Big Pond Station" (Cretaceous Time period)
12	12	"One Small Dinosaur"	Corey Powell	Microraptor	October 1, 2009	"Microraptor Mountain Station" (Early Cretaceous Time period)
12	12	"T. Rex Migration"	Craig Bartlett	Tyrannosaurus behavior	October 1, 2009	"Rexville Station" (Late Cretaceous Time period), "Pleasant Plains Station" (Late Cretaceous Time period), "Quadruped Corners Station" (Late Cretaceous Time period)
Mrs. P. takes Buddy and Tiny to meet her friend Minnie Microraptor and her son Mikey. When Mrs. P. takes Buddy and Tiny to visit Annie, Dolores and Boris, an avisaurus tells them all three T. Rexes moved north weeks earlier.
13	13	"Hootin' Hadrosaurs!"	Mark Drop	Parasaurolophus, Hadrosaurs, musical improvisation	November 9, 2009	"Corythosaurus Canyon Station" (Cretaceous Time period)
13	13	"Surprise Party"	Joe Purdy	Beetles	November 9, 2009	"Pteranodon Terrace Station" (Cretaceous Time period)
The kids have a play date with Cory Corythosaurus and meet her friend Perry, a Parasaurolophus. Buddy's family and friends plan a surprise party for him on board the Dinosaur Train.
14	14	"The Theropod Club"	Joe Purdy	Allosaurus	November 10, 2009	"Allosaurus Forest Station" (Jurassic Time period)
14	14	"Hatching Party"	Elise Allen	Eggs	November 10, 2009	"Corythosaurus Canyon Station" (Cretaceous Time period)
15	15	"The Old Spinosaurus and the Sea"	Mark Drop	Spinosaurus	November 11, 2009	"The Big Misty Sea Station" (Cretaceous Time period)
15	15	"A Spiky Tail Tale"	Mark Drop	Stegosaurus tail	November 11, 2009	"Stegosaurus Forest Station" (Jurassic Time period)
16	16	"Night Train"	Craig Bartlett	Troodon nocturnal lifestyle	November 12, 2009	"The Big Pond Station" (Cretaceous Time period)
16	16	"Fossil Fred"	Jon Greenberg	Fossils	November 12, 2009	"The Big Pond Station" (Cretaceous Time period)
17	17	"Dinosaurs in the Snow"	Craig Bartlett	Troodon ranges	December 14, 2009	"North Pole Station" (Cretaceous Time period)
17	17	"Cretaceous Conifers"	Corey Powell	Conifers	December 14, 2009	"Troodon Town Station" (Cretaceous Time period)
The Pteranodon family travels to the North Pole where they learn about snow and meet Travis Troodon, who teaches them about cold weather adaptation. Mrs. Pteranodon teaches the kids about Winter solstice, her favorite holiday. Then they learn about conifers, which they use to decorate the Dinosaur Train and their nest.
18	18	"The Burrowers"	Elise Allen	Oryctodromeus	January 18, 2010	"Oryctodromeus Oasis Station" (Cretaceous Time period)
18	18	"Shiny's Sea Shells"	Corey Powell	Seashells	January 18, 2010	"The Big Pond Station" (Cretaceous Time period)
19	19	"King Cryolophosaurus"	Mark Drop	Cryolophosaurus	February 15, 2010	"Cryolophosaurus Crest Station" (Jurassic Time period)
19	19	"Buddy the Tracker"	Craig Bartlett	Footprints	February 15, 2010	"The Big Pond Station" (Cretaceous Time period)
20	20	"The Old Bird"	Elise Allen	Archaeopteryx	February 16, 2010	"Archaeopteryx Lagoon Station" (Jurassic Time period)
20	20	"Diamond Don"	Elise Allen	Minerals	February 16, 2010	"Pteranodon Terrace Station" (Cretaceous Time period)
21	21	"Dinosaur Camouflage"	Corey Powell	Lesothosaurus	April 12, 2010	"Lesothosaurus Landing Training Station" (Jurassic Time period)
21	21	"Family Scavenger Hunt"	Joe Purdy	Drosera	April 12, 2010	"The Big Pond Station" (Cretaceous Time period)
22	22	"Have You Heard About the Herd?"	Mark Drop	Einiosaurus	April 13, 2010	"Einiosaurus Plains Station" (Cretaceous Time period)
22	22	"Jess Hesperornis"	Joe Purdy	Hesperornis	April 13, 2010	"The Big Pond Station" (Cretaceous Time period)
23	23	"Triassic Turtle"	Craig Bartlett	Proganochelys, Turtles	May 3, 2010	"Proganochelys Place Station" (Triassic Time period)
23	23	"Tank's Baby Brother"	Elise Allen	Offspring	May 3, 2010	"Triceratops Trails Station" (Cretaceous Time period)
The kids meet Adam Adocus, who tells them some species of turtle that can't retract their heads. So the family visits the Triassic to meet one of those turtles and learn how they protect themselves from predators. While Shiny and Don are out fishing with their dad, Mrs. P. takes Tiny and Buddy to meet Trudy Triceratops' new baby, but they find their friend Tank isn't so happy about having a baby brother.
24	24	"Erma Eoraptor"	Mark Drop	Eoraptor	May 4, 2010	"Eoraptor Ravine Station" (Triassic Time period)
24	24	"Under the Volcano"	Corey Powell	Volcanoes	May 4, 2010	"Volcano Valley Station" (Cretaceous Time period)
While Shiny and Don stay with their dad to explore the beach, Mrs. P. takes Buddy and Tiny to the Triassic period to meet an Eoraptor, one of the earliest dinosaur species. Mr. P. takes Tiny and Buddy to visit their local volcano, "Old Smokey." Shiny and Don stay home with their mom because they're too nervous about the idea, but when they change their minds, confusion ensues.
25	25	"Pteranodon Family World Tour"	Craig Bartlett	Amargasaurus	May 24, 2010	"Giganatosaurus Junction Station" (Cretaceous Time period), "Amargasaurus Acres Station" (Cretaceous Time period)
25	25	"Gilbert the Junior Conductor"	Elise Allen	South America	May 24, 2010	"Giganatosaurus Junction Station" (Cretaceous Time period)
26	26	"Confuciusornis Says"	Joe Purdy	Confuciusornis	May 25, 2010	"Confuciusornis Gardens Station" (Cretaceous Time period)
26	26	"Tiny's Tiny Doll"	Craig Bartlett	Asia	May 25, 2010	"Velociraptor Valley Station" (Cretaceous Time period)
27	27	"Iggy Iguanodon"	Mark Drop	Iguanodon	May 26, 2010	"Iguanodon Inlet Station" (Cretaceous Time period)
27	27	"Shiny Can't Sleep"	Joe Purdy	Sleep	May 26, 2010	None
The Pteranodon family continues their World Tour and meets Iggy Iguanodon, a large, four-legged chap who shows them his unique way of walking while leading them to some famous white cliffs. Shiny has trouble sleeping in the Dinosaur Train, so her dad takes her for a walk, and, with Mrs Conductor, they observe the night activities of nocturnal creatures.
28	28	"Kenny Kentrosaurus"	Corey Powell	Kentrosaurus	May 27, 2010	"Kentrosaurus Savannah Station" (Jurassic Time period)
28	28	"Don and the Troodons"	Elise Allen	Africa	May 27, 2010	"African Savannah Station" (Jurassic Time period)
29	29	"Long Claws"	Corey Powell	Therizinosaurus	June 28, 2010	"Therizinosaurus Thicket Station" (Cretaceous Time period)
29	29	"Tank's Sleep Over"	Elise Allen	Sleep (non-human)	June 28, 2010	"Pteranodon Terrace Station" (Cretaceous Time period)
30	30	"New Neighbors"	Craig Bartlett	Lambeosaurus	July 12, 2010	"Pteranodon Terrace Station" (Cretaceous Time period)
30	30	"Don's Collection"	Joe Purdy	Collections	July 12, 2010	"Pteranodon Terrace Station" (Cretaceous Time period)
31	31	"The Wing Kings"	Jordan D. Brown	Quetzalcoatlus	July 13, 2010	"Quetzocoatlus Canyon Station" (Cretaceous Time period)
31	31	"The Big Mud Pit"	Craig Bartlett	Mud	July 13, 2010	"The Big Pond Station" (Cretaceous Time period)
32	32	"Paulie Pliosaurus"	Kati Rocky	Pliosaurus	August 23, 2010	"Pliosaurus Pool Station" (Jurassic Time period), "Pteranodon Terrace Station" (Cretaceous Time period)
32	32	"Elmer Visits the Desert"	Johanna Nemeth	Deserts	August 23, 2010	"Elasmosaurus Ocean Station" (Cretaceous Time period), "Desert Sands Station" (Jurassic Time period)
The Pterenodon family travels underwater to meet a Pliosaurus, a marine reptile nicknamed the "T. Rex of the ocean." Mrs. P. takes the kids for a play date with Elmer Elasmasaurus, who rides in the train's Aqua Car. Together they visit a desert that once was an ocean and meet Percy Paramacellodus.
33	33	"Buck-Tooth Bucky"	Holly Huckins	Masiakasaurus	September 27, 2010	"Masiakasaurus Meadows Station" (Cretaceous Time period)
33	33	"Tiny's Tiny Friend"	Craig Bartlett	Cimolestes	September 27, 2010	"Pteranodon Terrace Station" (Cretaceous Time period)
34	34	"Elmer Elasmosaurus"	Craig Bartlett	Elasmosaurus	September 28, 2010	"Elasmosaurus Reef Station" (Cretaceous Time period)
34	34	"Dinosaur Block Party"	Craig Bartlett	Ecosystems	September 28, 2010	"Pteranodon Terrace Station" (Cretaceous Time period)
The Pteranodon family visit an underwater station and meet Elmer Elasmosaurus who has been riding in the Dinosaur Train's Aqua Car to visit other oceans. The Pteranodon family hosts a potluck block party to introduce their new Lambeosaurus neighbors to other species living around Pteranadon Terrace and the Big Pond.
35	35	"Carla Cretoxyrhina"	Elise Allen	Cretoxyrhina	October 11, 2010	"Cretoxyrhina Coral Station" (Cretaceous Time period)
35	35	"Train Trouble"	Joe Purdy & Craig Bartlett	Ornithomimus, trains	October 11, 2010	"Pteranodon Terrace Station" (Cretaceous Time period), "Troodon Town Station" (Cretaceous Time period)
The family travels to an underwater station to meet a friendly young shark and her dad. Mrs. P. takes the kids to meet Oren and Ollie Ornithomimus and their mom on the train for a play date in Troodon Town, but the Dinosaur Train has engine trouble.
36	36	"An Armored Tail Tale"	Mark Drop	Euoplocephalus	November 8, 2010	"Ankylosaurus Acres Station" (Cretaceous Time period), "The Big Pond Station" (Cretaceous Time period)
36	36	"Pterosaur Flying Club"	Joe Purdy	Pterosaur	November 8, 2010	"Peteinosaurus Place Station" (Triassic Time period)
37	37	"The Amazing Michelinoceras Brothers"	Joe Purdy	Michelinoceras	November 19, 2010	"Michelinoceras Mollusk Station" (Triassic Time period)
37	37	"Dad's Day Out"	Joe Purdy	Weather	November 19, 2010	"The Big Pond Station" (Cretaceous Time period)
Mrs. P. takes the kids underwater to meet Mitch and Max Michelinoceras. Mr. P. takes Buddy and Tiny to the Big Pond to spend the day with Annie Tyrannosaurus, Leroy Lambeosaurus, and their dads, Larry and Boris.
38	38	"Great Big Stomping Dinosaur Feet!"	Joe Purdy	Daspletosaurus	December 6, 2010	"Pteranodon Terrace Station" (Cretaceous Time period)
38	38	"Hornucopia!"	Elise Allen	Styracosaurus	December 6, 2010	"The Big Pond Station" (Cretaceous Time period)
39	39	"The Good Mom"	Elise Allen	Maiasaura	January 17, 2011	"The Big Pond Station" (Cretaceous Time period)
39	39	"Diamond Anniversary"	Mark Drop	Caves	January 17, 2011	"Pteranodon Terrace Station" (Cretaceous Time period)
40	40	"Junior Conductor Jamboree"	Joe Purdy	Mesozoic	May 6, 2011	"Troodon Town Station" (Cretaceous Time period), "Lesothosaurus Canyon Station" (Jurassic Time period), "Peteinosaurus Place Station" (Triassic Time period), "Eoraptor Ravine Station" (Triassic Time period), "Pteranodon Terrace Station" (Cretaceous Time period)
40	40	"Troodon Train Day"	Craig Bartlett	Steam engines	May 6, 2011	"Troodon Town Station" (Cretaceous Time period)

=== Season 2 (2011–13) ===
The second season of Dinosaur Train began airing on August 22, 2011, with a one-hour special, "Dinosaur Big City." Other hour-long specials during season two included "Dinosaurs A to Z," which aired May 14, 2012 and "Dinosaur Train Submarine Adventure," which aired February 18, 2013.

No. overall	No. in season	Title	Lessons taught	Original release date	Stations visited (Time period)
41	1	"Dinosaur Big City, Part 1"	Laramidia	August 22, 2011	"Pteranodon Terrace Station" (Cretaceous Time period), "Allosaurus Forest Station" (Jurassic Time period)
41	1	"Dinosaur Big City, Part 2"	Theropods (in general)	August 22, 2011	"Cryolophsaurus Crest Station" (Jurassic Time period), "Ornithomimus Corner Station" (Cretaceous Time period)
42	2	"Dinosaur Big City, Part 3"	Kosmoceratops	August 22, 2011	"Laramidia" (Cretaceous Time period)
42	2	"Dinosaur Big City, Part 4"	Paleontologists	August 22, 2011	"Laramidia" (Cretaceous Time period)
The Pteranadon family explore Laramidia while looking for the Theropod convention. When King Cryolophosaurus escapes from a mob of fans on the Dinosaur Train's engine, the Pteranadon family and their T. Rex friends go looking for him.
43	3	"Haunted Roundhouse"	Volaticotherium	October 20, 2011	"Troodon Town Station" (Cretaceous Time period)
43	3	"Big Pond Pumpkin Patch"	The Moon	October 20, 2011	"The Big Pond Station" (Cretaceous Time period)
44	4	"Stargazing on the Night Train"	Sinovenator, constellations	November 14, 2011	"Sinovenator Station" (Cretaceous Time period)
44	4	"Get into Nature!"	Tide pools	November 14, 2011	"Pteranodon Terrace Station" (Cretaceous Time period)
45	5	"Shiny and Snakes"	Sanajeh	November 15, 2011	"Sanajeh Center Station" (Cretaceous Time period)
45	5	"Tiny Loves Flowers"	Flowers, plant life cycle, change in nature	November 15, 2011	"The Big Pond Station" (Cretaceous Time period)
Dad takes the kids in search of the legendary giant snake, Sanajeh. The Pteranadon family goes to the Big Pond looking for Tiny's favorite flowers.
46	6	"Buddy Explores the Tyrannosaurs"	Raptorex	November 16, 2011	"Raptorex Ridge Station" (Cretaceous Time period)
46	6	"Rainy Day Fight"	Beaches	November 16, 2011	"Pteranodon Terrace Station" (Cretaceous Time period)
47	7	"That's Not a Dinosaur!"	Amphibians	November 17, 2011	"The Big Pond Station" (Cretaceous Time period)
47	7	"Tiny's Garden"	Gardens	November 17, 2011	"Pteranodon Terrace Station" (Cretaceous Time period), "The Big Pond Station" (Cretaceous Time period)
48	8	"The Earthquake"	Ceratopsians	February 6, 2012	"Protoceratops Sand Station" (Cretaceous Time period)
48	8	"The Nursery Car"	Dinosaur eggs	February 6, 2012	None
49	9	"The Lost Bird"	Jeholornis	February 7, 2012	"Jeholornis Junction Station" (Cretaceous Time period)
49	9	"The Forest Fire"	Redwood trees	February 7, 2012	"Cimoloestes Central Station" (Cretaceous Time period)
50	10	"Dry Times at Pteranodon Terrace"	Droughts	February 8, 2012	"The Big Pond Station" (Cretaceous Time period)
50	10	"Big Misty Sea Fishing Contest"	Piscivores	February 8, 2012	"The Big Misty Sea Station" (Cretaceous Time period)
51	11	"Hurricane at Pteranodon Terrace"	Hurricanes	February 9, 2012	"Pteranodon Terrace Station" (Cretaceous Time period)
51	11	"Rafting the Cretaceous"	Rafts	February 9, 2012	"Appalachia Station" (Cretaceous Time period)
52	12	"Don's Winter Wish"	Saurornitholestes	February 20, 2012	"North Pole Station" (Cretaceous Time period)
52	12	"Festival of Lights"	Aurora	February 20, 2012	"North Pole Station" (Cretaceous Time period)
53	13	"Dinosaurs A to Z, Part 1: The Big Idea"	Diversity, Gallimimus	May 14, 2012	"Apatosaurus Acres Station" (Jurassic Time period), "Einiosaurus Acres Station" (Cretaceous Time period), "Fabrosaurus Field Station" (Jurassic Time period), "Gallimimus Gulch Station" (Cretaceous Time period)
53	13	"Dinosaurs A to Z, Part 2: Spread The Word"	Nodosaurus	May 14, 2012	"Hadrosaurus Haven Station" (Cretaceous Time period), "Iguanodon Inlet Station" (Jurassic Time period), "Kentrosaurus Savannah Station" (Jurassic Time period), "Pteranadon Terrace Station" (Cretaceous Time period), "Megalosaurus Marsh Station" (Jurassic Time period)
Tiny and Buddy have the "big idea" to get all 26 dinosaurs from the "Dinosaurs A to Z" song on the train and go to Troodon Town for a picnic. While continuing to pick up dinosaurs, Tiny, Buddy, Mrs. P., Mr. Conductor and Mrs. Conductor set up a communication center in the caboose and recruit birds invite dinosaurs for the train ride and picnic. Later they're joined on the train by the rest of the Pteranadon family.
54	14	"Dinosaurs A to Z, Part 3: Classification"	Classification	May 14, 2012	"Ornithomimus Orchard Station" (Cretaceous Time period), "Parasaurolophus Plains Station" (Cretaceous Time period), "Qantassaurus Station" (Cretaceous Time period), "Rhabdodon Ridge Station" (Cretaceous Time period)
54	14	"Dinosaurs A to Z, Part 4: A To Z Picnic"	Yangchuanosaurus, Zigongosaurus	May 14, 2012	"Utahraptor Ally Station" (Cretaceous Time period), "Wannanosaurus Woodlands Station" (Cretaceous Time period), "Yangchuanosaurus Yard Station" (Jurassic Time period), "Zigongosaurus Zenith Station" (Jurassic Time period), "Troodon Town Station" (Cretaceous Time period)
55	15	"Remember the Alamosaurus"	Alamosaurus	August 13, 2012	"Alamosaurus Pine Station" (Cretaceous Time period)
55	15	"Sunrise, Sunset"	Nocturnal and diurnal	August 13, 2012	"The Big Pond Station" (Cretaceous Time period)
56	16	"A Heck of a Neck"	Diplodocus	August 14, 2012	"Diplodocus Hill Station" (Jurassic Time period)
56	16	"Gilbert Visits the Nest"	Collections	August 14, 2012	"Pteranodon Terrace Station" (Cretaceous Time period)
Mrs Pteranodon takes Buddy, Tiny, Shiny and Don to meet Denise Diplodocus, a dinosaur with an extremely long neck. While Gilbert is visiting the Pteranodon nest, Shiny gets jealous when he spends more time with the others and flies off. Will Gilbert, Buddy, Don and Tiny find Shiny and persuade her to play with them?
57	17	"An Apatosaurus Adventure"	Apatosaurus	August 15, 2012	"Apatosaurus Acres Station" (Jurassic Time period)
57	17	"Nature Art"	Environmental art	August 15, 2012	"Pteranodon Terrace Station" (Cretaceous Time period)
58	18	"Arnie Rides the Flatcar"	Argentinosaurus	August 16, 2012	"Argentinosaurus Plains Station" (Cretaceous Time period)
58	18	"Old Reliable"	Geysers	August 16, 2012	"Geyser Gulch Station" (Cretaceous Time period)
59	19	"Tiny and the Crocodile"	Deinosuchus	December 10, 2012	"Deinosuchus Swamp Station" (Cretaceous Time period)
59	19	"Meet the Grandparents"	Migration	December 10, 2012	"Pteranodon Terrace Station" (Cretaceous Time period)
The Pteranadon family must face their fears to meet Deanna Deinosuchus, a giant Pteranadon-eating crocodilian. Grandma and Grandpa Pteranadon visit the kids for the first time since they hatched.
60	20	"The Egg Stealer?"	Oviraptor	December 11, 2012	"Pteranodon Terrace Station" (Cretaceous Time period)
60	20	"To Grandparents' Nest We Go!"	Appalachia	December 11, 2012	"Pteranadon Trails Station" (Cretaceous Time period)
61	21	"Double-Crested Trouble"	Dilophosaurus	December 12, 2012	"Dilophosaurus Dune Station" (Jurassic Time period)
61	21	"Erma and the Conductor"	Meteors	December 12, 2012	"Eoraptor Ravine Station" (Trassic Time period) "The Big Pond Station" (Cretaceous period)
62	22	"Dome-Headed Dinosaur"	Pachycephalosaurus	December 13, 2012	"Pachycephalosaurus Plateau Station" (Cretaceous Time period)
62	22	"Treasure Hunt"	Fossils	December 13, 2012	"Amber A'Royal Station" (Cretaceous Time period)
63	23	"Dinosaur Train Submarine: Otto Ophthalmosaurus"	Ophthalmosaurus	February 19, 2013	"Elasmosaurus Reef Station" (Cretaceous Time period), "Jurassic Ocean" (Jurassic Time period)
63	23	"King Meets Crystal"	Cryolophosaurus	February 19, 2013	"Troodon Town Station" (Cretaceous Time period)
64	24	"Dinosaur Train Submarine: Shoshana Shonisaurus"	Shonisaurus	February 20, 2013	"Triassic Ocean Station" (Triassic Time period)
64	24	"All Kinds of Families"	Sauroposeidon	February 20, 2013	"Microraptor Mountain Station" (Early Cretaceous Time period)
65	25	"Dinosaur Train Submarine: Maisie Mosasaurus"	Mosasaurus	February 21, 2013	"Western Interior Seaway Station" (Cretaceous Time period)
65	25	"Date Night"	Chirostenotes	February 21, 2013	"Pteranodon Terrace Station" (Cretaceous Time period)
66	26	"Dinosaur Train Submarine: A Sea Turtle Tale"	Archelon	February 22, 2013	"Local Western Interior Sea Underwater Station" (Cretaceous Time period)
66	26	"Rocket Train"	High speed trains	February 22, 2013	"Troodon Town Station" (Cretaceous Time period), "Proganochelys Pond Station" (Triassic Time period)

=== Season 3 (2014–15) ===
PBS Kids ordered a third season of 13 half-hour episodes to premiere in the spring of 2014 (that being the first two episodes). The first two episodes aired on January 20, 2014, as a one-hour special titled "Nature Trackers Adventure Camp." The others started to air on August 18, 2014, beginning with the one-hour "Classic in the Jurassic" special.

No. overall	No. in season	Title	Lessons Taught	Original release date	Stations visited (Time period)
67	1	"Adventure Camp: Rafting"	Rafting	January 20, 2014	"Adventure Camp River Station" (Cretaceous Time period)
67	1	"Adventure Camp: Mountain Climbing"	Mountains	January 20, 2014	"Adventure Camp Mountain Station" (Cretaceous Time period)
68	2	"Adventure Camp: Ziplining"	Rainforests	January 20, 2014	"Adventure Camp Rainforest Station" (Cretaceous Time period)
68	2	"Adventure Camp: Canyon Hiking"	Canyons	January 20, 2014	"Adventure Camp Canyon Station" (Cretaceous Time period)
69	3	"Classic in the Jurassic: Turtle and Theropod Race"	Turtles	August 18, 2014	"Classic in the Jurassic Sports Station" (Jurassic Time period)
69	3	"Hungry, Hungry Carnivores"	Carcharodontosaurus	August 18, 2014	"Carcharodontosaurus Carrion Station" (Cretaceous Time period)
The family attends the turtle and theropod races during the Classic in the Jurassic sports event. Laura Giganotosaurus takes Buddy and his family to meet a Carcharodontosaurus chef.
70	4	"Classic in the Jurassic: Air Obstacle Race"	Pterodaustro	August 19, 2014	"Classic in the Jurassic Sports Station" (Jurassic Time period)
70	4	"King and Crystal Live!"	Courtship displays	August 19, 2014	"Cryolophsaurus Crest Station" (Jurassic Time period)
71	5	"Classic in the Jurassic: Air, Water and Land"	Crocodilians	August 20, 2014	"Classic in the Jurassic Sports Station" (Jurassic Time period)
71	5	"Desert Day and Night"	Desert climate	August 20, 2014	"Jurassic Desert Station" (Jurassic Time period)
72	6	"Classic in the Jurassic: Ultimate Face-Off"	Anti predator adaption	August 21, 2014	"Classic in the Jurassic Sports Station" (Jurassic)
72	6	"Back in Time"	Permian	August 21, 2014	"Eoraptor Ravine Station" (Triassic Time period), "Pedestrian Time Tunnel" (Permian Time period)
73	7	"Solar Train"	Solar energy	October 6, 2014	"Troodon Town Station" (Cretaceous Time period), "Proganochelys Pond Station" (Triassic Time period)
73	7	"Birdwatching"	Birdwatching	October 6, 2014	"Archaeopteryx Lagoon Station" (Jurassic Time period), "Protopteryx Plains Station" (Cretaceous Time period)
74	8	"Rocket Train Surprise Party"	Ginkgo leaves	October 6, 2014	"Troodon Town Station" (Cretaceous Time period), "Ginkgo Grove Station" (Jurassic Time period)
74	8	"Cloudy with a Chance of Fun"	Clouds	October 6, 2014	"The Big Pond Station" (Cretaceous Time period)
75	9	"One Big Frog"	Beelzebufo	October 27, 2014	"Beelzebufo River Station" (Cretaceous Time period)
75	9	"Caving with Vlad"	Caving	October 27, 2014	"Volaticotherium Valley Station" (Jurassic Time period)
76	10	"Tiny's Fishing Friend"	Castorocauda	April 20, 2015	"Castorcauda Corner Station" (Jurassic Time period)
76	10	"Butterflies"	Butterflies	April 20, 2015	"Pteranodon Terrace Station" (Cretaceous Time period)
The kids take their friend Cindy Cimolestes in search of a mammal that eats fish. After an orange butterfly becomes separated from a larger group while flying near the Pteranadon family's nest, Don promises to help him find his family.
77	11	"Best Ever Babysitter"	Chirostenotes	April 21, 2015	"The Big Pond Station" (Cretaceous Time period), "Pteranodon Terrace Station" (Cretaceous Time period)
77	11	"Plant a Tree"	Trees	April 21, 2015	"Pteranodon Terrace Station" (Cretaceous Time period)
78	12	"Zeppelin: Waterfall"	Waterfalls	June 15, 2015	"Dinosaur Train Zeppelin Station" (Cretaceous Time period), "Quetzalcoatlus Canyon Station" (Cretaceous Time period)
78	12	"Zeppelin: Atoll"	Atoll	June 15, 2015	"Dinosaur Train Zeppelin Station" (Cretaceous Time period), "Cretaceous Ocean" (Cretaceous Time period)
79	13	"Zeppelin: Pangaea"	Pangaea	June 15, 2015	"Dinosaur Train Zeppelin Station" (Cretaceous Time period)
79	13	"Zeppelin: Crater"	Crater	June 15, 2015	"Dinosaur Train Zeppelin Station" (Cretaceous Time period)

=== Season 4 (2015–17) ===
PBS Kids renewed Dinosaur Train for a fourth season of 10 half-hour episodes, which premiered on December 7, 2015. The final two episodes of the fourth season first aired as a one-hour "What's at The Center of The Earth?" special on February 20, 2017.

No. overall	No. in season	Title	Lessons Taught	Original release date	Stations visited (Time period)
80	1	"Trains, Submarines and Zeppelins: Part 1"	Pterosaurs	December 7, 2015	"The Big Pond Station" (Cretaceous Time period), "Pteranodon Terrace Station" (Cretaceous Time period), "Elasmosaurus Under Sea Station" (Cretaceous Time period), "North Pole Station" (Cretaceous Time period), "Eoraptor Ravine Station" (Triassic Time period), "Proganochelys Place Station" (Triassic Time period), "Zeppelin Station" (Cretaceous Time period)
80	1	"Trains, Submarines and Zeppelins: Part 2"	Trains	December 7, 2015	"The Big Pond Station" (Cretaceous Time period), "Pteranodon Terrace Station" (Cretaceous Time period), "Elasmosaurus Under Sea Station" (Cretaceous Time period), "North Pole Station" (Cretaceous Time period), "Eoraptor Ravine Station" (Triassic Time period), "Proganochelys Place Station" (Triassic Time period), "Zeppelin Station" (Cretaceous Time period)
81	2	"Rollin' on The Riverboat Part 1"	Ecosystems	March 7, 2016	"Pteranodon Seaside Station" (Cretaceous Time period)
81	2	"Rollin' on The Riverboat Part 2"	Marine creatures	March 7, 2016	"Pteranodon Seaside Station" (Cretaceous Time period)
82	3	"Nest Swap"	Pterosaurs	March 8, 2016	"Nemicolopterus Nook Station" (Early Cretaceous Time period)
82	3	"The Herd is The Word"	Ceratopsians	March 8, 2016	"Triceratops Picnic Park Station" (Late Cretaceous Time period)
83	4	"Stop and Smell The Flowers"	Plants, Flowers and Smell	March 9, 2016	"Qianzhousaurus Pond Station" (Late Cretaceous Time period)
83	4	"Moms' Campout"	Plants, Flowers and Smell	March 9, 2016	"The Big Pond Station" (Cretaceous Time period)
84	5	"Where Have All The Lizards Gone?"	Predator, prey	March 10, 2016	"Lizard Island Station" (Cretaceous Time period)
84	5	"Conductor's Sleepover"	Sleeping	March 10, 2016	"Pteranodon Terrace Station" (Cretaceous Time period)
85	6	"Junior Conductor's Academy Part 1"	Deinocheirus	April 6, 2016	"Laramidia" (Cretaceous Time period)
85	6	"Junior Conductor's Academy Part 2"	Theropods	April 6, 2016	"Laramidia" (Cretaceous Time period)
86	7	"Crystal and King Benefit Concert, Part 1"	Overfishing, Sauropods, Cryolophosaurus	April 25, 2016	"The Big Pond Station" (Cretaceous Time period)
86	7	"Crystal and King Benefit Concert, Part 2"	Overfishing, Sauropods, Cryolophosaurus	April 25, 2016	"The Big Pond Station" (Cretaceous Time period)
When the Pteranodon family learns that the Big Pond is being overfished, Crystal and King Cryolophosaurus help organize a concert to raise awareness among the other dinosaurs.
87	8	"Spooky Tree"	Bioluminescence	October 17, 2016	"Pteranodon Terrace Station" (Cretaceous Time period)
87	8	"Spinosaurus Super Model"	Spinosaurus	October 17, 2016	"The Big Misty Sea Station" (Late Cretaceous Time period)
Shiny's sleepover with Annie gets halted when Don mentions a weird looking tree that comes alive at night. Will Annie and Shiny pause their sleepover and investigate the tree, or stay far away from it? Don needs Old Spinosaurus to pose for his sculpture when he finds a stick that looks a lot like him, but the grumpy dinosaur refuses.
88	9	"What's at The Center of The Earth? Layers!"	Earth's layers	February 20, 2017	"Cretaceous Cavern Station" (Cretaceous Time period)
88	9	"What's at The Center of The Earth? Fossils!"	Fossils	February 20, 2017	"Fossil Alley" [no station] (Cretaceous Time period)
Mr. P. and the kids join Mr. Conductor and Gilbert aboard the drill train to search for a location for a new underground train station. They learn about Earth's layers, meet Natasha Necrolestes, and find fossils from different time periods.
89	10	"What's at The Center of The Earth? Troglobites!"	Troglobites	February 20, 2017	"Troglobites' cave" [no station] (Cretaceous Time period)
89	10	"What's at The Center of The Earth? Minerals!"	Minerals	February 20, 2017	"Dinosaur Train Underground Station" [future site] (Cretaceous Time period)
The search for the perfect location for the underground station continues. The kids learn about troglobite senses when they meet cave-dwelling creatures without eyes. After the tip of the drill train breaks, they learn about rocks and minerals.

=== Season 5 (2019–20) ===
The fifth season of Dinosaur Train consists of 11 half-hour episodes that aired on PBS Kids, starting on August 26, 2019.

No. overall	No. in season	Title	Written by	Lessons Taught	Original release date	Stations visited (Time period)
90	1	"The Tiny-saur Train"	Craig Bartlett	Microraptor, Yi qi	August 26, 2019	"Yi qi Yards Station" (Jurassic Time period), "Pteranadon Terrace Station" (Cretaceous Time period)
90	1	"How Many Horns?"	Joe Purdy	Ceratopsians, Regaliceratops	August 26, 2019	"Protoceratops Sands Station" (Cretaceous Time period), "Einiosaurus Acers Station" (Cretaceous Time period), "The Big Pond Station" (Cretaceous Time period), "Royal Regaliceratops Station" (Late Cretaceous Time period), "Triceratops Herd Station"
During a visit from their friend Mikey Microraptor, the kids go looking for an even smaller dinosaur. Tank Triceratops joins the kids to search for other dinosaurs with horns.
91	2	"Mom Was a Kid Once"	Rachel Lipman	Friendship, fear, Globidens	August 27, 2019	"Pteranodon Seaside Station" (Cretaceous Time period)
Annie and Shiny disagree when Shiny gets scared while exploring a cave. Mom and her friend Tilly tell the kids about the time Mom got too scared to complete one of their childhood adventures. Mom and Tilly (along with Annie, Shiny and Tiny) visit the old neighborhood where they complete Mom and Tilly's unfinished adventure and meet Goldie Globidens.
92	3	"Gilbert the Conductor"	Christie Insley	Peteinosaurus, teamwork	August 26, 2019	"Rexville Station" (Cretaceous Time period), "Brachiosaurus Gardens Station" (Jurassic Time period), "Allosaurus Forest Station" (Jurassic Time period), "Peteinosaurus Place Station" (Triassic Time period)
92	3	"A Clubhouse of Their Own"	Joe Purdy	Planning, cooperation, natural materials	August 26, 2019	None
When Mr. Conductor gets sick, Gilbert takes over running the Dinosaur Train, but he runs into problems when he tries to follow the manual and keep the passengers happy. When the kids find the nest too crowded they go looking for a new place to play, then build their own clubhouse.
93	4	"A Brand New Species"	Craig Bartlett	Paleontology, camouflage, Dracoraptor	August 26, 2019	"Troodon Town Station" (Cretaceous Time period), "Lesothosaurus Lawns Station" (Early Jurassic Time period), "Dracoraptor Dell Station" [future site] (Early Jurassic Time period)
When Buddy trips over a fossil, the kids and Mr. Conductor discover a new dinosaur species and present their discovery to scientists. Then they travel to the early Jurassic to find out more about their discovery.
94	5	"Don's Hole-iday"	Christie Insley	holes and diversity	August 26, 2019	"Oryctodromeus Oasis Station" (Cretaceous Time period),
94	5	"We're Not All Dinosaurs"	Joe Purdy	holes and diversity	August 26, 2019	"The Big Pond Station" (Cretaceous Time period)
The kids make up an imaginary holiday for Don. The Pteranodon meet a new small mammal friend, Adele Alpahadon.
95	6	"Love Day"	Christie Insley	Spreading love to others; types of leaves	February 10, 2020	"Pteranodon Terrace Station" (Cretaceous Time period)
95	6	"A New Leaf"	Joe Purdy	Spreading love to others; types of leaves	February 10, 2020	"Pteranodon Terrace Station" (Cretaceous Time period)
Inspired by one small move, the Pteranodon kids decide to spread love to every member of their family. Mr. and Mrs. Pteranodon make cleaning up fun by turning it into a scavenger hunt.
96	7	"Underwater Race"	Joe Purdy	Liopleurodon, aerodynamics	March 30, 2020	"North Atlantic Ocean" (Jurassic Time Period), "The Big Pond Station" (Cretaceous Time period)
96	7	"Buddy Wants to Fly"	Christie Insley	Liopleurodon, aerodynamics	March 30, 2020	"Troodon Town Station" (Cretaceous Time period)
Mr. Conductor and Thurston race in their submarines in the Jurassic. Inspired by his Pteranodon siblings, Buddy designs his very own wings.
97	8	"King and Crystal Play Red Rock"	Craig Bartlett	Nyctosaurus	March 31, 2020	"Cryolophosaurus Crest Station" (Jurassic Time Period), "Red Rock Amphitheater Station" (Cretaceous Time Period),
97	8	"Nick of Time"	Joe Purdy	Nyctosaurus	March 31, 2020	"Pteranodon Terrace Station" (Cretaceous Time Period)
King and Crystal Cryolophosaurus perform at Red Rock Amphitheater in the Cretaceous. Mr. Pteranodon meets his long-time friend, Nick Nyctosaurus.
98	9	"Migration Vacation"	Joe Ansolabehere	Migration, appreciation for mothers	April 1, 2020	"Rexville Station" (Cretaceous Time Period),
98	9	"Moms Rawk!"	Craig Bartlett	Migration, appreciation for mothers	April 1, 2020	"The Big Pond Station" (Cretaceous Time Period)
Buddy joins Annie and her family on her migration. Inspired by this, the Pteranodon kids ask their mother to give them a pretend migration at the Big Pond.
99	10	"The Beelzebufo Cometh"	Joe Purdy	Beelzebufo, Deinocheirus	April 2, 2020	"The Big Pond Station" (Cretaceous Time Period),
99	10	"Dennis Comes to Visit"	Rachel Lipman	Beelzebufo, Deinocheirus	April 2, 2020	"Pteranodon Terrace Station" (Cretaceous Time Period)
Benny Beelzebufo somehow appears at the Big Pond and the kids have to bring him back home. Dennis, the autistic Deinocheirus, visits the Pteranodon family.
100	11	"Father's Day"	Craig Bartlett	Cenozoic, Mastodon	June 15, 2020	"Troodon Town Station" (Cretaceous Time Period), "Ice Age" (Cenozoic Era)
Mr. Conductor uses an experimental Drill Train to find his father whom he believes was lost in the Cenozoic – far into the dinosaurs' future where no dinosaur has gone before.

== Film (2021) ==
Title	Written by	Original release date
Dinosaur Train: Adventure Island	Craig Bartlett	April 12, 2021
The Pteranodon family takes the Dinosaur Train to Adventure Island, a new theme park on a volcanic island.
