= Dinosaur Train =

Animated children's television series

- Also known as: Jim Henson's Dinosaur Train
- Genre: Educational; Adventure; Fantasy; Children; Animated
- Created by: Craig Bartlett
- Directed by: Craig Bartlett; Terry Izumi
- Presented by: Dr. Scott D. Sampson
- Voices of: Phillip Corlett; Sean Thomas; Dayton Wall; Chance Hurstfield; Claire Corlett; Erika-Shaye Gair; Alexander Matthew Marr; Laura Marr; Ian James Corlett; Colin Murdock; Ellen Kennedy
- Opening theme: "Dinosaur Train"
- Ending theme: "Dinosaur Train"
- Composers: Jim Lang; Mike Himelstein; Michael Silversher
- Countries of origin: United States; Canada; Singapore
- Original language: English
- No. of seasons: 5
- No. of episodes: 100 (+1 direct-to-TV movie) (list of episodes)

Production
- Executive producers: Craig Bartlett; Brian Henson; Lisa Henson; Halle Stanford
- Producer: Sue Bea Montgomery
- Running time: 28 minutes
- Production companies: Media Development Authority; Sparky Animation; The Jim Henson Company

Original release
- Network: PBS Kids
- Release: September 7, 2009 – April 12, 2021

Dinosaur Train is an animated children's television series created by Craig Bartlett, who also created Nickelodeon's Hey Arnold!. The series is centered on a young anthropomorphic orange Tyrannosaurus rex named Buddy who, together with a family of Pteranodons, takes the Dinosaur Train to explore the Mesozoic, and has adventures with a variety of dinosaurs. It is produced by The Jim Henson Company, the Infocomm Media Development Authority (formerly the Media Development Authority), Sparky Animation, FableVision, Snee-Oosh, Inc., and Tail Waggin' Productions in association with Reel FX and Sea to Sky Entertainment. A film based on the series for Universal Pictures and Universal 1440 Entertainment titled, Dinosaur Train: Adventure Island premiered on April 12, 2021.

A revival is currently in the works at the Jim Henson Company, alongside Sid the Science Kid.

== Premise ==
The show is set in a whimsical prehistoric world of jungles, swamps, volcanoes, mountains and oceans, all filled with dinosaur and other prehistoric animal life, connected by a railroad served by an eponymous passenger train, the Dinosaur Train. Its passenger cars can accommodate dinosaurs of all kinds: windows accommodate long-necked sauropods, there is headroom in the Observation Car for the larger theropods and sauropods, the Aqua Car is an aquarium for sea-going passengers. The train itself is run by Troodons, being one of the smartest dinosaurs in this fictional universe. The Dinosaur Train circles the whole world, crossing oceans and inland seas, with stops to visit undersea prehistoric animals. It can travel through the entire Mesozoic Era, the "Age of Dinosaurs", passing through magical Time Tunnels to the Triassic, Jurassic, and Cretaceous time periods.

The world of Dinosaur Train is seen through the eyes of Buddy, an orange Tyrannosaurus rex. According to the show's main title song, Buddy was adopted by Mr. and Mrs. Pteranodon**. He hatched at the same time as his Pteranodon siblings Tiny, Shiny, and Don. With his family, he travels in the Dinosaur Train around the Mesozoic, supplied with dinosaur facts by the train's Troodon Conductor. As an adopted child in a mixed-species family, Buddy is curious about the differences between species and likes to compare their features. The dinosaur species featured in the show are actual dinosaurs discovered by paleontologists.

Dinosaur Train is produced and animated by Sparky Animation in Singapore, with casting by Vidaspark and voice-overs recorded at Kozmic Sound in Vancouver, British Columbia, Canada. It premiered on Labor Day 2009 and aired daily on PBS Kids in the US, as well as in various countries around the world. 40 half-hour episodes were ordered by PBS Kids for the first season. After that, 49 additional episodes were made. As of September 2018, PBS Kids had ordered 11 more episodes, taking the total number of episodes to 100. Each episode is followed by a live-action segment featuring Dinosaur Train educational consultant and paleontologist Dr. Scott D. Sampson, or "Scott the pa who appears on screen to explain the show's dinosaur curriculum in greater detail.

**In the title song, Buddy hatched out of an odd egg, but in a later episode it tells us that he was adopted

== Episodes ==
Season	Segments	Episodes	Originally aired	
Season	Segments	Episodes	First aired	Last aired
1	80	40	September 7, 2009	May 6, 2011
2	52	26	August 22, 2011	February 22, 2013
3	26	13	January 20, 2014	June 15, 2015
4	20	10	December 7, 2015	February 20, 2017
5	19	11	August 26, 2019	June 15, 2020
Film			April 12, 2021	

== Voice cast ==
Left to right: Shiny, Buddy, Tiny, Don

=== Main cast ===
- Phillip Corlett as Buddy the T-Rex (seasons 1–2)
- Sean Thomas as Buddy the T-Rex (season 3)
- Dayton Wall as Buddy the T-Rex (season 4)
- Chance Hurstfield as Buddy the T-Rex (season 5)
- Claire Corlett as Tiny Pteranodon, Polly Polycotylus
- Erika-Shaye Gair as Shiny Pteranodon, Annie Tyrannosaurus, Cory Corythosaurus
- Alexander Matthew Marr as Don Pteranodon (seasons 1–2), Tank Triceratops (seasons 1–2), Quincy Quetzalcoatlus (Season 1)
- Laura Marr as Don Pteranodon (seasons 3–5), Tank Triceratops (seasons 3–5), Quincy Quetzalcoatlus (Season 3)
- Ian James Corlett as Mr. Conductor Troodon, Adam Adocus, Aidan Adocus, Alan Alamosaurus, Elliott Enantiornithine (in "Now with Feathers!"), Morris Stegosaurus, Mr. Argentinosaurus, Mr. Brachiosaurus, Mr. Corythosaurus, Mr. Daspletosaurus, Mr. Elasmosaurus, Pete Pachycephalosaurus, Quentin Qianzhousaurus, Stuart Stygimoloch, Travis Troodon, Triceratops, Troodon Official, Vincent Velociraptor, Teddy Pterodaustro, Frankie Fruitafossor, Troodon Waiter, Wan Wannanosaurus, Seabird, Nick Nyctosaurus, Trevor Troodon
- Colin Murdock as Mr. Pteranodon, Announcer, Elliott Enantiornithine, Hank Ankylosaurus, Ralph Einiosaurus, Station Master, Stuart Styracosaurus, Ziggy Zhejiangopterus, Mr. Stygimoloch, Manny Megalosaurus, Otto Ophthalmosaurus, Xavier Xenotarsosaurus, Yang Yangchuanosaurus, Grandpa Pteranodon, Carson Carcharodontosaurus (Chef C), Gary Goniopholis, Crockett Cricket, Maurice Mammut
- Ellen Kennedy as Mrs. Pteranodon, Mrs. Einiosaurus, Mrs. Elasmosaurus, Hattie Hadrosaurus, Patty Pachycephalosaurus, Grandma Pteranodon

=== Additional voices ===
- Mark Acheson as Marvin Mosasaurus
- Michael Adamthwaite as Jess Hesperornis, Reggie Raptorex
- William Ainscough as Dennis Deinocheirus (Season 4)
- Joshua Ballard as Ernie Einiosaurus
- Ashleigh Ball as Arnie Argentinosaurus, Baby Archelon, Crystal Cryolophosaurus, Gilbert Troodon, Lorraine Lambeosaurus, Maiasaura Mom, Millie Maiasaura, Mrs. Therizinosaurus, Oren Ornithomimus, Reba Rhabdodon, Gwendolyn Glyptops, Lily Lambeosaurus (Season 4), Grandma Chelsea Changyuraptor, Carla Crayfish
- Kathleen Barr as Angela Avisaurus, Dolores Tyrannosaurus, Erma Eoraptor, Fanny Fabrosaurus, Jacqueline Jaxartosaurus, Laura Giganotosaurus, Mrs. Corythosaurus, Mrs. Ornithomimus, Ned Brachiosaurus, Ollie Ornithomimus, Pauline Proganochelys, Peggy Peteinosaurus, Selma Cimolestes, Trudy Triceratops, Tuck Triceratops, Velma Velociraptor, Velociraptor Mom, Remy Rhamphorhynchus, Effie Effigia, Paulette Polycotylus, Nelly Nemicolopterus, Goldie Globidens, Queen Regina Regaliceratops, Styracosaurus Courtier
- Craig Bartlett as Spider
- Adam Behr as Kenny Kentrosaurus
- Zen Blocka as Dennis Deinocheirus (Season 5)
- Nicole Bouma as Soren Saurornitholestes
- Jason Bryden as Tommy Ptilodus
- Jim Byrnes as Percy Paramacellodus
- Natasha Calis as Leslie Lesothosaurus, Maisie Mosasaurus
- Adrienne Carter as Kiera Chirostenotes (season 2)
- Garry Chalk as Marco Megaraptor
- Shannon Chan-Kent as Allie Alamosaurus
- Allison Cohen as Carla Cretoxyrhina
- Dylan Sloane Cowan as Rodney Raptorex
- Michelle Creber as Michelle Maiasaura, Teri Therizinosaurus
- Brenda Crichlow as Denise Diplodocus
- Deb Demille as Deanna Deinosuchus
- Trevor Devall as Boris Tyrannosaurus, Bucky Masiakasaurus, Mr. Deinonychus, Thurston Troodon, Peng Protopteryx, Benny Beelzebufo, Mr. Sea Star, Leo Liopleurodon
- Michael Dobson as Old Spinosaurus
- Aidan Drummond as Truman Triceratops
- Brian Drummond as Alvin Allosaurus, Apollo Apatosaurus, Albert Albanerpeton, Eugene Euoplocephalus, Larry Lambeosaurus, Mr. Quetzalcoatlus, Mr. Therizinosaurus, Norm Nodosaurus, Quinn Qantassaurus, Sammy the Slug, Ulysses Utahraptor, Zhuang Zigongosaurus, Trevor Triceratops, Emperor Globidens, Trenton Triceratops, Igor Ichthyosaur, Grandpa Chester Changyuraptor, Grateful Dreadnoughtus, Mr. Styracosaurus (Season 5)
- Brynna Drummond as Daphne Daspletosaurus
- Mitchell Duffield as Mookie Maiasaura
- Alex Ferris as Paulie Pliosaurus
- Andrew Francis as Patrick Pachycephalosaurus
- Alberto Gishi as Mitch Michelinoceras
- Nico Gishi as Leroy Lambeosaurus, Max Michelinoceras
- Gordon Grice as Derek Deinonychus (Season 2), Elmer Elasmosaurus
- Olivia Hamilton as Lily Lambeosaurus
- Phil Hayes as Chung Confuciusornis, King Cryolophosaurus
- Maryke Hendrikse as Penelope Protoceratops
- Ryan Hirakida as Dylan Dilophosaurus
- Benjamin Jacobson as Jackson Pteranodon
- Alessandro Juliani as Martin Amargasaurus
- Diana Kaarina as Tricia Troodon (most appearances), Jackson’s Mom
- James Kirk as Perry Parasaurolophus, Rick Oryctodromeus, Nick Oryctodromeus
- Andrea Libman as Pamela Pachycephalosaurus
- Christine Lippa as Mrs. Lesothosaurus
- Alan Marriott as Henry Hermit Crab, Herbie Hermit Crab, Iggy Iguanodon, Mayor Kosmoceratops, Deon Dimetrodon, Hap Haplocheirus, Bernie Beetle, Cornelius Crab
- Erin Mathews as Stacie Styracosaurus
- Erin Matthews as Judy Jeholornis, Vera Velociraptor
- Andrew McNee as Mayor Kosmoceratops (Season 5), Drew Dracoraptor, Head Paleontologist
- Donnie McNeil as Devlin Dilophosaurus
- Jason Michas as Henry Hermit Crab (Season 1)
- Bill Mondy as Jack Einiosaurus
- Peter New as Sydney Sinovenator
- Nicole Oliver as Brenda Brachiosaurus, Mrs. Pliosaurus
- Cedric Payne as Petey Peteinosaurus
- Adrian Petriw as Vlad Volaticotherium
- Joseph Purdy as Mr. Disclaimer
- Meg Roe as Natasha Necrolestes, Sylvester Spider, Tilly Pteranodon, Adele Alphadon
- Kelly Sheridan as Olivia Oviraptor
- Valin Shinyei as Sonny Sauroposeidon
- Rebecca Shoichet as Tricia Troodon ("Zeppelin: Pangaea" only), Kiera Chirostenotes (season 3), Cassie Castorocauda
- Tabitha St. Germain as Angela Avisaurus, Arlene Archaeopteryx, Baby Archelon, Baby Stygimoloch, Cindy Cimolestes, Gabby Gallimimus, Keenan Chirostenotes, Computer Voice, Mikey Microraptor, Minnie Microraptor, Mom Archelon, Mrs. Conductor, Mrs. Deinonychus, Patricia Palaeobatrachus, Rita Raptorex, Sana Sanajeh, Selma Cimolestes, Shirley Stygimoloch, Sonja Styracosaurus, Spiky Stygimoloch, Stella Sea Star, Stephie Styracosaurus, Troodon Mom, Nancy Nemicolopterus, Cockroach
- Chantal Strand as Valerie Velociraptor
- Lee Tockar as Crab, Craig Cretoxyrhina
- Vincent Tong as Yuan Yi Qi
- Kira Tozer as Ella Brachiosaurus
- Travis Turner as Chandler Changyuraptor
- Cainan Wiebe as Derek Deinonychus (Season 1), Todd Triceratops
- Chiara Zanni as Shoshana Shonisaurus

=== UK voice cast ===
The UK dub only aired the first two seasons on Nick Jr. in the UK and Ireland from 2012 to 2015.

- Alex Starke as Buddy Pteranodon
- Sophia Andrews as Tiny Pteranodon
- Isobel Doran as Shiny Pteranodon
- Jack Graham as Don Pteranodon
- Christina Denham as Mrs. Pteranodon
- Hugo Chandor as Mr. Pteranodon
- Keir Stewart as Mr. Conductor and King Cryolophosaurus
- Joe Mills as Old Spinosaurus, Mayor Kosmoceratops and Vlad Volaticotherium

== Production ==
=== Development ===
In early 2008, after the successful first run of Hey Arnold! on Nickelodeon, Craig Bartlett decided to create another children series, this one set during the era of the dinosaurs, including the Triassic, Jurassic, and Cretaceous periods. Bartlett conceived the idea for the show, drew the main characters, and wrote a pilot script. Bartlett said he got the idea of the show after he saw one of his kids put a toy dinosaur in a toy train.

=== Episode segments ===
(clips from episodes)

- Time for a Tiny Ditty – Tiny either singing about something she learned on the show or about her favorite dish, fish.
- Buddy has a Hypothesis – Children learn from Buddy and Tiny what a hypothesis means.
- Dr. Scott the Paleontologist – Scott Sampson is a paleontologist who appears on the show to teach children about the dinosaurs which have appeared in each episode, and how dinosaurs compare to present-day animals (including humans). He received his PhD in zoology from the University of Toronto in 1993 and, as of August 2019, is the CEO for Science World at TELUS World of Science in Vancouver, BC.

=== Songs ===
- "Theme Song" – The opening theme, which is about a mom named Mrs. Pteranodon and her children, including a T. Rex whose egg landed in her nest, revealed to be written by King in his debut episode.
- "Hungry Hungry Herbivore" – An adult Brachiosaurus (judging by his deep voice) shows up to sing a song about how herbivores love to eat green food.
- "I'm a T-Rex" – Buddy sings that he finally realizes that he is T-Rex, and sings about living in the Cretaceous Forest.
- "Dinosaurs A-Z" – Mr. Conductor sings the Dinosaur Alphabet that his mother taught him. A later version of the song is sung by Buddy and Tiny, keeping track of the twenty-six different dinosaur species in the song to pick up on the train for a picnic at Troodon Town.
- "Cryolophosaurus Crests" – King sings about his crest.
- "My Tiny Place" – Tiny sings about her "Tiny Place", which is actually her hideout in the form of a small hole in a tree. She sometimes shares it with Cindy Cimolestes.
- "Nice to Meet You (My Name is Tiny)" – Tiny's song she sings to Leslie to tell her how she can talk to other dinosaurs without getting scared.
- "All Aboard" – The original theme song before the official Dinosaur Train theme song.
- "Tiny Loves Fish" – Tiny sings a song about how she loves fish.
- "I Love Trains" – Mr. Conductor sings about his love for trains.
- "I'll Always Be Your Mom" – Mrs. Pteranodon sings to her kids on how much she loves them.
- "Dinosaur Feet" – Daphne Daspletosaurus and the gang sings about their great big stomping dinosaur feet.
- "Sleep Little Dinosaur" – Buddy, Tiny, Shiny, Mrs. Pteranodon and Tank Triceratops sing Tank's lullaby that his mom sings to him every night.
- "A New Way to Sing a Song" – Shiny sings in a concert with Buddy, Tiny, Don, Cory Corythosaurus and Perry Parasaurolophus.
- "Dinosaur Block Party" – Mr. Conductor sings about living in an ecosystem at the Pteranodon family's block party.
- "Get into Nature Song" – Song about the Nature Trackers club and getting into nature.
- "That's Not a Dinosaur" – Tiny and the gang sings about how not every animal in the Mesozoic Era is or is not a dinosaur.
- "No Place Like Our Nest" – The Pteranodon family sings about how their nest is the only home for them.
- "The Biggest Dinosaurs" – Over several episodes the Pteranodon family go on trips to see the biggest sauropods, and this song is specific to those episodes.
- "The Prettiest Pteranodon" – Mr. Pteranodon sing it to his wife while on date night.
- "Taking the Zeppelin Home" – Mr. Conductor, Thurston, Mr. Pteranodon and Larry sing as they fly home to Pteranodon Terrace.
- "What's at the Center of the Earth?" – The Pteranodon Family, Mr. Conductor, and Gilbert sing about the center of the Earth as they venture in it.
- "The Dinosaur Train Zeppelin" – The Pteranodon Family and Mr. Conductor sing as they travel in the zeppelin.
- "Laramidia (The Dinosaur Big City)" – All the dinosaurs get together and sing about Laramidia, also known as the Dinosaur Big City. The first version is sung by the Pteranodon Family and Mr. Conductor. The second version is sung by King Cryolophosaurus and Mayor Kosmoceratops.

== Reception ==
Emily Ashby of Common Sense Media rated the show four stars out of five, stating that "Young dinos travels teach kids about science and diversity."

== Home media ==
DVDs of the series from PBS Distribution were produced from 2010 to 2019. It also became part of PBS Kids compilation DVDs until 2021, being replaced by Elinor Wonders Why.

StudioCanal UK and StudioCanal Germany released the series on DVD in their respective countries.

== In other media ==
=== Live show ===
A live show, "Jim Henson's Dinosaur Train Live: Buddy's Big Adventure", toured the United States and Canada from September 2013 to June 2014.

=== Film ===
In July 2020, Craig Bartlett announced an 85-minute musical film based on the series on Instagram. The film, titled Dinosaur Train: Adventure Island, premiered on April 12, 2021 on PBS Kids, serving as the series finale.
