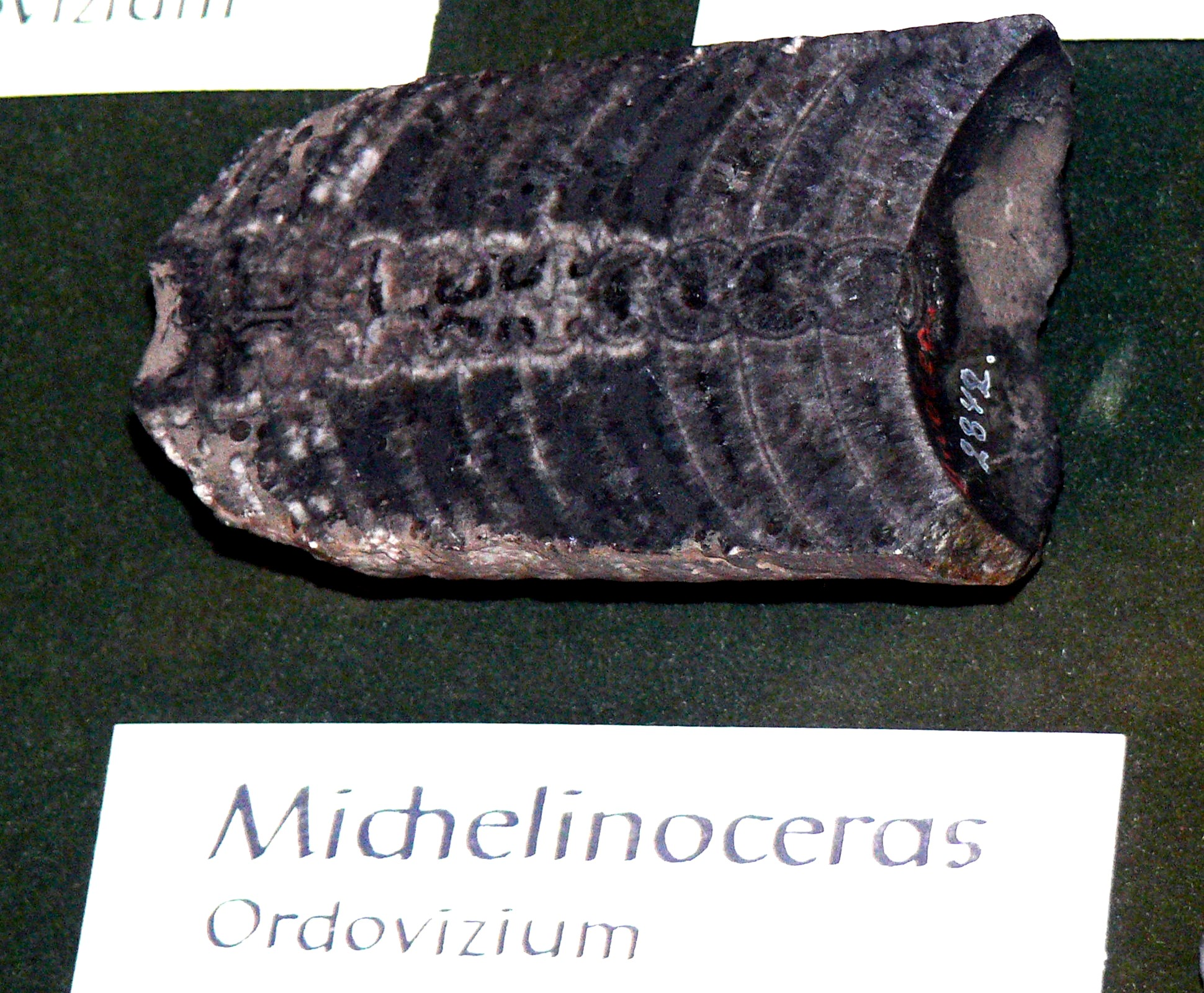

Scientific classification
- Kingdom: Animalia
- Phylum: Mollusca
- Class: Cephalopoda
- Order: †Orthocerida
- Family: †Michelinoceratidae
- Genus: †Michelinoceras; Foeste, 1932

= Michelinoceras =

Michelinoceras Temporal range: Ordovician to Triassic

Extinct genus of molluscs

Michelinoceras is the oldest known genus of the Michelinocerida, more commonly known as the Orthocerida, characterized by long, slender, nearly cylindrical orthocones with a circular cross section, long camerae, very long body chambers, and a central or near central tubular siphuncle free of organic deposits. Septal necks are straight; connecting rings cylindrical and thin. Cameral deposits are well developed. A radula has been found in one species, with seven teeth per row. It had ten arms, two of which formed longer tentacles.

== Range ==
Michelinoceras ranges from late in the Early Ordovician to the Devonian with more poorly known species from the Carboniferous to the Late Triassic included in the genus. The earliest known unequivocal species is Michelinoceras primum found in Cassinian age strata near the top of the Lower Ordovician El Paso Group in southern New Mexico and west Texas. A less well known species of Michelinoceras, M. primum?, comes from further down in the same formation, near the beginning of the Cassinian.

== Taxonomy and derivation ==
Michelinoceras named by Foeste in 1932 is the ancestral and characteristic genus of the Michelinoceratidae, established and described by Flower in 1946; derived from empty siphuncle Baltoceratidae.

== See also ==
- List of nautiloids
