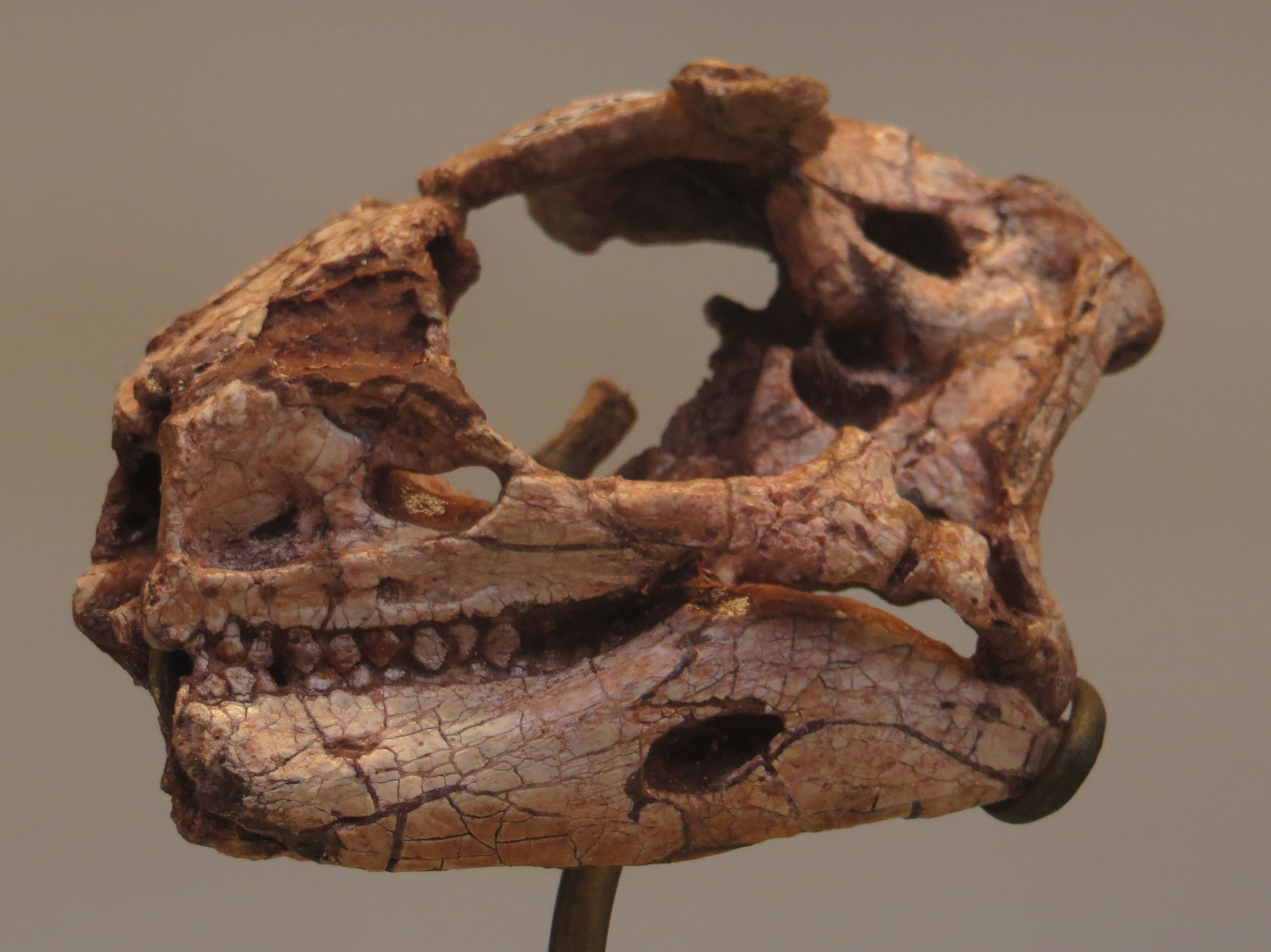
- MNHN LES 17, a skull

Scientific classification
- Kingdom: Animalia
- Phylum: Chordata
- Class: Reptilia
- Clade: Dinosauria
- Clade: †Ornithischia
- Clade: †Saphornithischia
- Clade: †Genasauria
- Genus: †Lesothosaurus; Galton, 1978

Type species
- †Lesothosaurus diagnosticus Galton, 1978

Synonyms
- Fabrosaurus australis? Ginsburg, 1964; Stormbergia dangershoeki Butler, 2005

= Lesothosaurus =

Lesothosaurus Temporal range: Early Jurassic, 199.6–190 Ma

Extinct genus of ornithischian dinosaur

Lesothosaurus is a monospecific genus of ornithischian dinosaur that lived during the Early Jurassic in what is now South Africa and Lesotho. It was named by paleontologist Peter Galton in 1978, the name meaning "lizard from Lesotho". The genus has only one valid species, Lesothosaurus diagnosticus. Lesothosaurus is one of the most completely-known early ornithischians, based on numerous skull and postcranial fossils from the Upper Elliot Formation. It had a simpler tooth and jaw anatomy than later ornithischians, and may have been omnivorous in some parts of the year.

== Discovery and naming ==
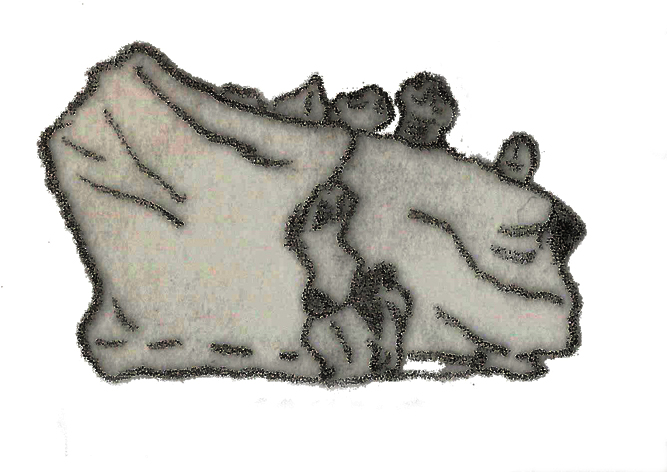
Illustration of the Fabrosaurus holotype dentary.

Fossils referrable to Lesothosaurus may have been known from as early as 1959, when a right dentary (lower jawbone) fragment bearing three teeth was collected by French geologist Jean Fabre from the Red Beds of the Upper Elliot Formation near Mapheteng in Lesotho, Southern Africa, dating to the Early Jurassic (199(?)-190 million years ago). The dentary was described as the holotype of a new genus and species, Fabrosaurus australis, by paleontologist Leonard Ginsburg in 1964. Ginsburg placed it in the family Scelidosauridae and diagnosed it based on its unusual tooth morphology when compared to the only other contemporary ornithischian Heterodontosaurus. Due to its fragmentary nature, Fabrosaurus is now seen as a nomen dubium, though the holotype is likely from an individual of Lesothosaurus. The holotype was all that was known until expeditions by the London University College to the same site in Lesotho from 1963 to 1964 recovered scores of fossils from Lesothosaurus, including a partial skeleton including a skull and another isolated partial skull (NHMUK PV RU B17 & NHMUK PV RU B23). These specimens were described in the 1970s as belonging to Fabrosaurus by geologist Richard A. Thulborn. A joint expedition between the NHMUK, London University College, Yale University, and the South African Museum collected many additional specimens of Lesothosaurus from the same site in 1967–68. This included very well preserved cranial material, some of the best known, that was described in the 1991.

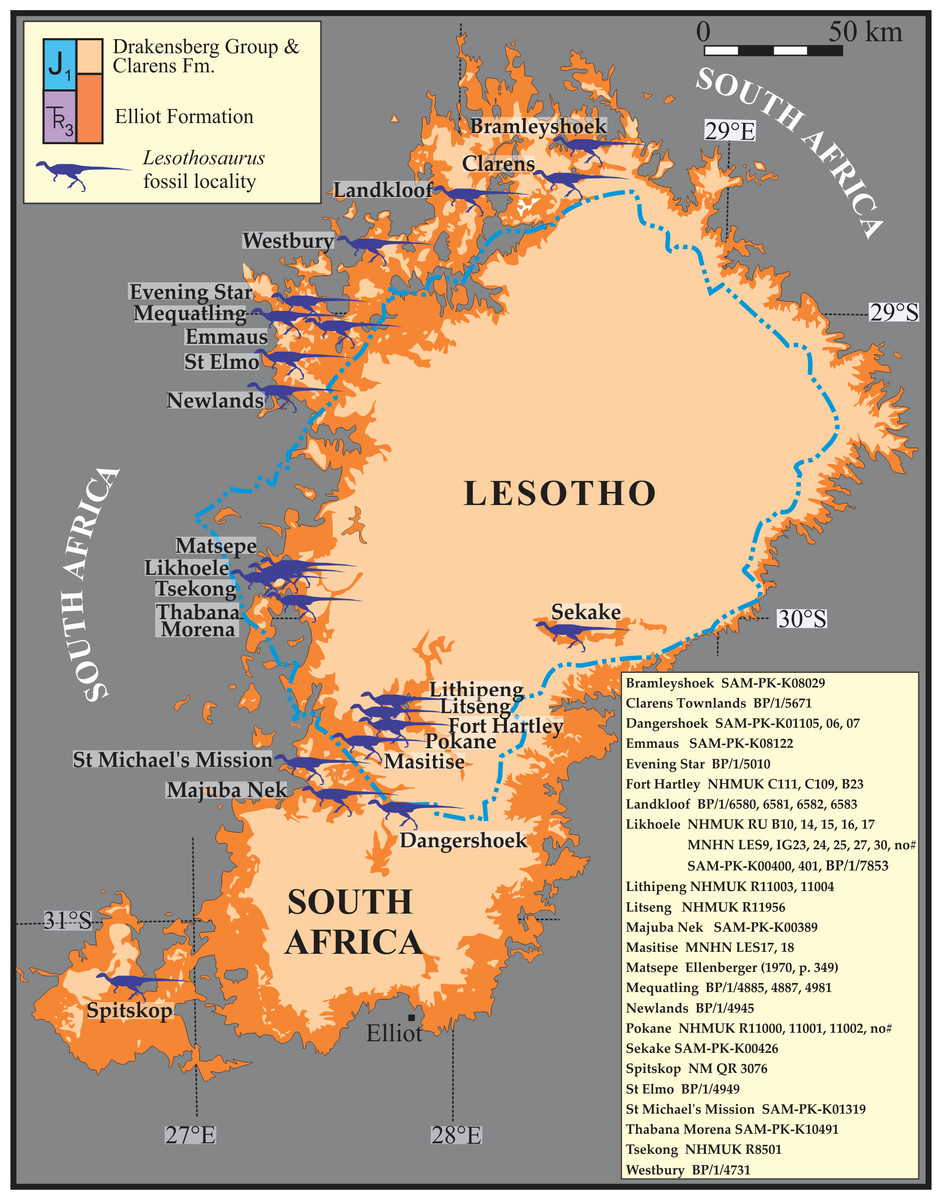
Map of where Lesothosaurus fossils have been found in Lesotho and South Africa.

British paleontologist Peter Galton named Lesothosaurus diagnosticus in 1978, with NHMUK PV RU B17 and NHMUK PV RU B23 as the syntypes (the series of fossils that diagnose a species). The generic name Lesothosaurus is derived from the Kingdom of Lesotho, where the fossils were discovered, and the Latin root sauros meaning "lizard", a root commonly used in dinosaur names. The specific name diagnosticus is derived from the Greek root diagnostikos meaning "distinguished" in reference to Lesothosaurus being a distinct member of Fabrosauridae. In the material referred to Lesothosaurus, Galton stated that some of it was instead from a "large fabrosaurid". This "large fabrosaurid" was finally named in 2005, dubbed Stormbergia dangershoeki, on the basis of the partial postcranial skeleton SAM-PK-K1105. This species almost certainly represents the adult form of Lesothosaurus. Stormbergia was named for the Stormberg Series of rocks in southern Africa, which includes the Elliot Formation, and the location (Dangerhoek Farm) in South Africa at which the type specimen was found. The type specimen consists of a partial postcranial skeleton, with two additional referred specimens assigned to the species.

Fossils from Elliot Formation sites in South Africa outside of Lesotho in Jamestown were described in the 2000s, including a nearly complete skeleton of an adult preserved in articulation. A study published in 2017 by Baron, Norman & Barrett demonstrated that the differences between Stormbergia and Lesothosaurus are most likely related to the animal's growth. The authors argued that Stormbergia is a junior subjective synonym of Lesothosaurus and should be regarded as invalid. Several other skull and postcranial specimens have been discovered since, including the description of two partial skulls in 2002, which preserved signs of individual variation. Redescription of the syntypes came in 2015 and 2017, including the integration of CT technology.

== Description ==
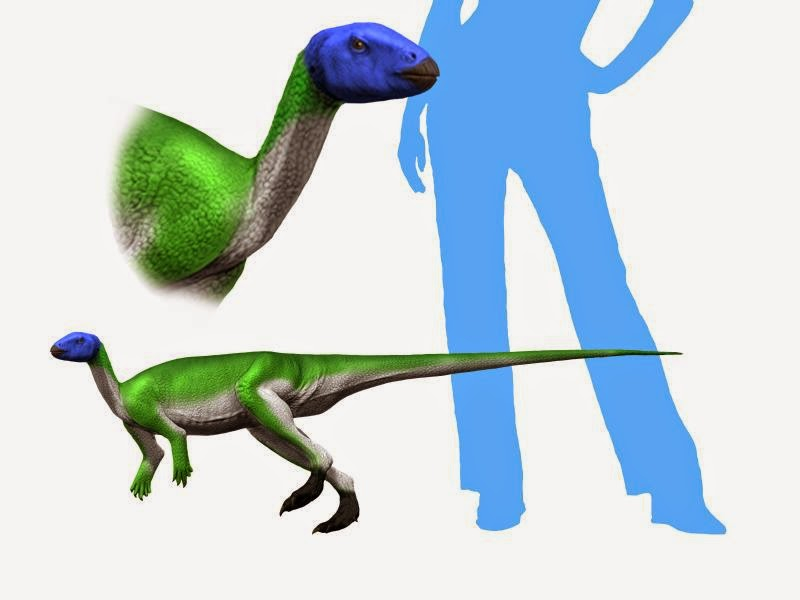
Life restoration (reconstructed without filaments) and size compared to a human

Due to the great quantity and quality of specimens known from Lesothosaurus, information about its anatomy is known in detail. Lesothosaurus was a lightly built, bipedal animal that varied between 1 (3.3 ft) to 2 meters (6.6 ft) long. It was one of the earliest ornithischians. Its long slender legs, small arms with hands that would not have been able to grasp properly, and slender tail all suggest that it was a fast runner. Like all ornithischians, the tips of Lesothosaurus upper and lower jaws were horny, forming a beaklike structure. Behind the beak were leaf-shaped teeth that lined the jaws. The teeth of the premaxillae (six per side) are more slender and curved than the maxillary teeth. Analysis of its teeth has shown that Lesothosaurus sliced up its food with its beak and was not able to chew its food. Studies of the tooth wear have shown much less abrasion on the teeth than would be expected of a plant-eater feeding mainly on tough, arid-climate plants, and concluded that Lesothosaurus was probably an opportunistic omnivore, feeding primarily on small animals during seasons when softer plants were not available.

The small skull of Lesothosaurus was narrow and pointed, with large eye sockets. It had large cavities for the eye and jaw muscles. The tip of the snout likely ended in a small beak, based on a blade-like predentary bone (at the tip of the lower jaw) and a roughly-texture front end of the cranium. Its teeth were pointed with grooved edges. The skull was mounted on a short but flexible neck.

A bonebed of Lesothosaurus described in 2016 includes material from three large individuals. This association suggest that this early ornithischian dinosaur may have lived in groups.

=== Skull and dentition ===
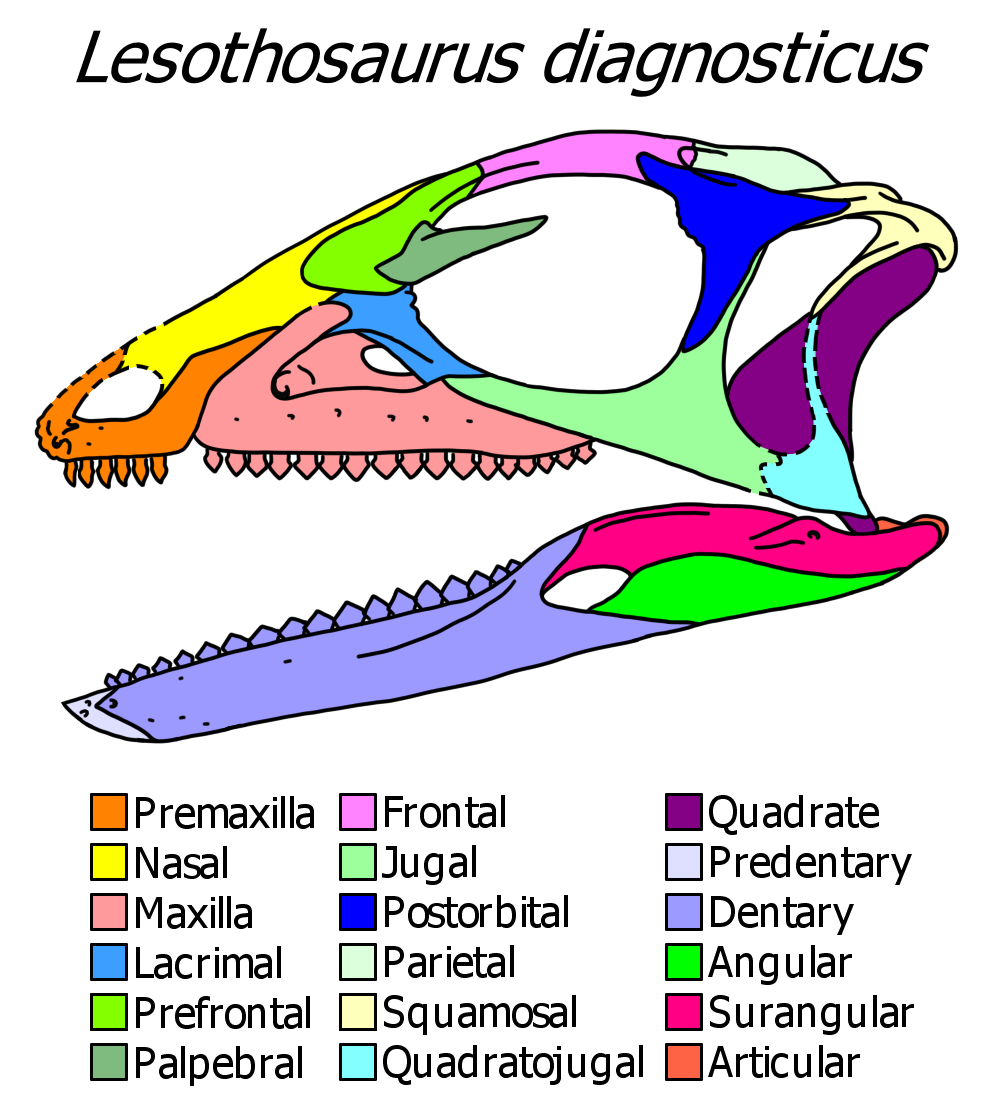
Skull diagram

The skull and teeth of Lesothosaurus are more generalized than the heavily specialized and unusual anatomies of the contemporary scelidosaurid and heterodontosaurid ornithischians, which exhibit traits like osteoderms and extreme heterodonty. The best preserved skull is NHMUK PV RU B23, though it is missing some elements. The skull was unlike the triangular skull of Heterodontosaurus in that the caudal half was boxy while the anterior half was tapered and elongated. The height apex of the cranium is just behind the orbit (eye socket) in lateral view and the skull roof (frontals, parietals) are gently rounded in lateral view. The snout is smoothly tapered to the premaxilla (snout tip bone). The skull lacks a break in slope along the snout anterior to the orbit, as in the contemporary Heterodontosaurus. The orbits are round and large relative to the skull size (making up 36% of the basal skull length i. e. from the premaxilla tip to the posterior margin of the basioccipital). The skulls bears a relatively small, sub-triangular antorbital fenestra (a large gap of bone) with an apex pointing dorsally and a length that is circa 13% of basal skull length. The supratemporal fenestrae are anteroposteriorly longer than mediolaterally wide, with a sub-ovary to sub-triangular outline in dorsal view. In contrast, the infratemporal fenestrae are sub-rectangular in lateral view and extend for most of the skull's height. The infratemporal fenestra is oblong with an oblique axis, while the supratemporal fenestra is oval in outline. The anterior naris (nostril) had several small, sub-ovate openings along its length. The craniomandibular joint (where the skull contacts the jaw bone) is depressed relative to the margin of the maxillary alveoli. There are 15-16 tooth positions in the maxilla, in contrary to the 11 preserved in Pisanosaurus' (a Late Triassic dinosauriform that may be an ornithischian). There are 20 tooth positions in the dentary of Lesothosaurus, but only 15 are preserved in Pisanosaurus. The alveolar foramina are on the medial wall of the maxilla and dentary, one per tooth position, and represent the area where the neurovascular supply accesses the dental lamina. This condition is similar to that in the extant Lepidosaurs, which have lizard lips, leading some paleontologists to suggest that Lesothosaurus had cheeks and lips covering its teeth. The cranium is widest across the postorbitals in dorsal view. It tapers anteriorly to the premaxillae, which creates a short, strongly pointed muzzle. The skull is widest at the midshafts of the quadrates in occipital view.

The mandible (lower jaw) of Lesothosaurus has a nearly straight ventral margin and bears only a slight upturn at its anterior tip. The mandible is made up mostly of the dentary, which is 50% of its length in lateral view. Characteristically of Ornithischians, there is a small beak-like bone at the tip of the dentary known as the predentary. The predentary is shaped like an arrowhead in ventral view, with one elongated central keel with smaller lateral processes jutting off the sides. The oral margin is smooth and straight in lateral view, with an uncurved anterior tip. Two foramina are preserved on and near the lateral processes, suggesting that this element was well-supplied with blood and nerves. There is a well-developed coronoid eminence, but it does not expand dorsally into the tall, distinct processes (projection of bone) like in advanced Ornithischians like Triceratops and Zalmoxes. The jaw joint is slightly depressed relative to the alveolar bar that takes up most of the mandible. The mandible preserves an anteroposteriorly elongated fenestra between the dentary, angular, and surrangular, similar to the ones in the skull, that would make the mandible lighter. The mandible differentiates from those of other Ornithischians greatly in that an inturned, 'spout-like' mandibular symphysis is preserved.

Lesothosaurus has two types of teeth preserved: long, curved, sharp premaxillary teeth at the front of the mouth; wide, short, robust maxillary and dentary teeth. There are 6 premaxillary teeth on the left and right sides of the premaxilla which are preceded by a small edentulous (tooth-lacking) section that shows signs of preserving a large rhampthotheca (beak) made of keratin. A neck and slight swelling divides the base of the tooth crown from the long, subcylindrical roots. The lingual surface of the more medial premaxillary teeth have a vertical furrow and an adjacent sharp ride that extends towards the crown's mesial edge. The last two teeth crowns in the series acquire distal and medial denticles. The posterior process of the premaxilla lacks alvelovi, creating a small diastema (gap) in between the premaxillary and maxillary tooth rows. The maxillary and dentary teeth are low, triangular, and "leaf-shaped" with a distinct neck and cingulum. The denticles are coarse on the medial and distal tooth borders, with sporadically developed high-angled marginal tooth wearing. This suggests rapid tooth replacement in these teeth.

=== Postcrania ===
Although many specimens are known, some elements of Lesothosaurus' postcranial anatomy are poorly known, especially in the axial skeleton which is incomplete in all specimens. The cervical (neck) vertebrae were only 9 in number, but no full cervical series are known. The cervical series of the syntype NHMUK PV R11004 preserves the 2nd cervical, known as the axis, in articulation with the 3rd cervical vertebra. The centrum of the axis is spool-shaped without a ventral keel. The neural arch is very large and well-developed, greatly extending posterodorsally past the postzygapophyses. The 3rd cervical is also amphicoelus but has a trapezoidal centrum shape. The neural arch is expanded dorsoventrally, but has a small neural spine. As for the dorsal (back) vertebrae, Lesothosaurus has no complete dorsal columns preserved but likely had 12–15 dorsal (back) vertebrae. The dorsals also had spool-shaped centra, ventral keels (though they are lost in more caudal centra), and neural spines that are short and rectangular. The neural spines of the anterior dorsals are also larger than those of the posterior ones. Ossified tendons are preserved attached to the neural spines of anterior dorsals, suggesting they were arranged longitudinally as in Heterodontosaurus, Scelidosaurus, and Hypsilophodon. This feature probably countered stress caused by bending forces acting on the spine during bipedal locomotion. The sacral vertebrae series had 5 vertebrae with sacral ribs and a sacrodorsal with a short sacral rib. The sacrals notably had large transverse processes that were muscle attachments to the sacral ribs. The number of caudal (tail) vertebrae is unknown, but the proximal caudals are well preserved. The centra of these caudals became more cylindrical as they became located distally, in contrast to the spool-shaped dorsal centra. The chevrons are Y-shaped in anterior and posterior view and attached to the ventral side of the caudal centra, with larger attachment points on the proximal caudals.

The scapula (shoulder blade) is not fused to the coracoid and is longer than the humerus (upper arm bone). The dorsal surface develops a large, bar-like acromion process that extends further dorsally than in many other ornithischians. The distal end of the scapula is greatly expanded and has a convex margin. The coracoid is disc-shaped and subcircular in lateral and medial views. No sternal ribs are preserved in Lesothosaurus, but based on related taxa, the sternal plates were connected to the rib cage by elements known as sternal ribs. The pelvis was long and expanded dorsally on the ilium, with a long pubis that had a stub-like prepubis connected to it. The ischium had a large proximal end with a curved, thin shaft.

The forelimbs were small relative to the rest of the body. The humerus was elongate and straight in anterior and lateral views, with expanded proximal and distal ends linked by a long, slender shaft. The proximal end had a large deltopectoral crest which was asymmetrical and C-shaped in dorsal view. The humeral shaft has a rounded, transverse cross-section. The humerus length was only 63.3% as long as the femur length, which is much shorter than other basal ornithischians. The radius is mostly straight except for transversely expanded proximal and distal ends, the proximal end having two small, rounded condyles. The ulna is also straight, but is slightly longer with an ovoid cross-section. There is only a single, incomplete manus known from Lesothosaurus. The manus has 5 metacarpals and 5 phalanxes, though only the second phalanx is fully preserved. The unguals are small and triangular in dorsal view.

The hindlimbs were long and slender, similar to those of most other small basal ornithischians. The femur (thigh bone) was long and bowed anteriorly, with a large 4th trochanter for muscle attachments. The femoral head at the proximal end was large, while the distal end terminated with two condyles where the tibia would interlock. The largest known femur is from NMQR 3076, which measures 273.70 millimetres (10.776 in) in length. The tibia (shin bone) has a very similar morphology, but it is 25% longer than the femur and more slender. The fibula has an expansion at the proximal end and a thin shaft that is sub-oval in cross-section. The astragalus and calcaneum are small, though the latter is the smaller of the two, and only preserved in one specimen. The metatarsals are thin, long, and tightly fit together. The metatarsals have great expansions at the distal ends where the pedal phalanges would articulate with the rest of the leg. Metatarsal III is the longest of them all and has the greatest transverse width distally and at the mid-shaft. The metatarsal I is truncated and less than half the length of metatarsal II. Notably, Lesothosaurus lacks a metatarsal V, a distinct trait of the taxon. The pedal digits (toes) are long, with pedal phalanges (toe bones) that are spool-shaped, with large proximal and distal ends but thin shafts. Digit I was a hallux, with one small phalange ending in a large ungual (claw). Digit II had two large, thick phalanges ending in a large, wide ungual. Digit III was the longest digit by length and had a combined length of 57.7 millimetres (2.27 in). It was composed of 3 pedal phalanges and an ungual. Digit IV had the most pedal phalanges, with 4 preserved and a small ungual. The ungual bones of the toes were claw-like, and not hoof-like as in more advanced ornithischians.

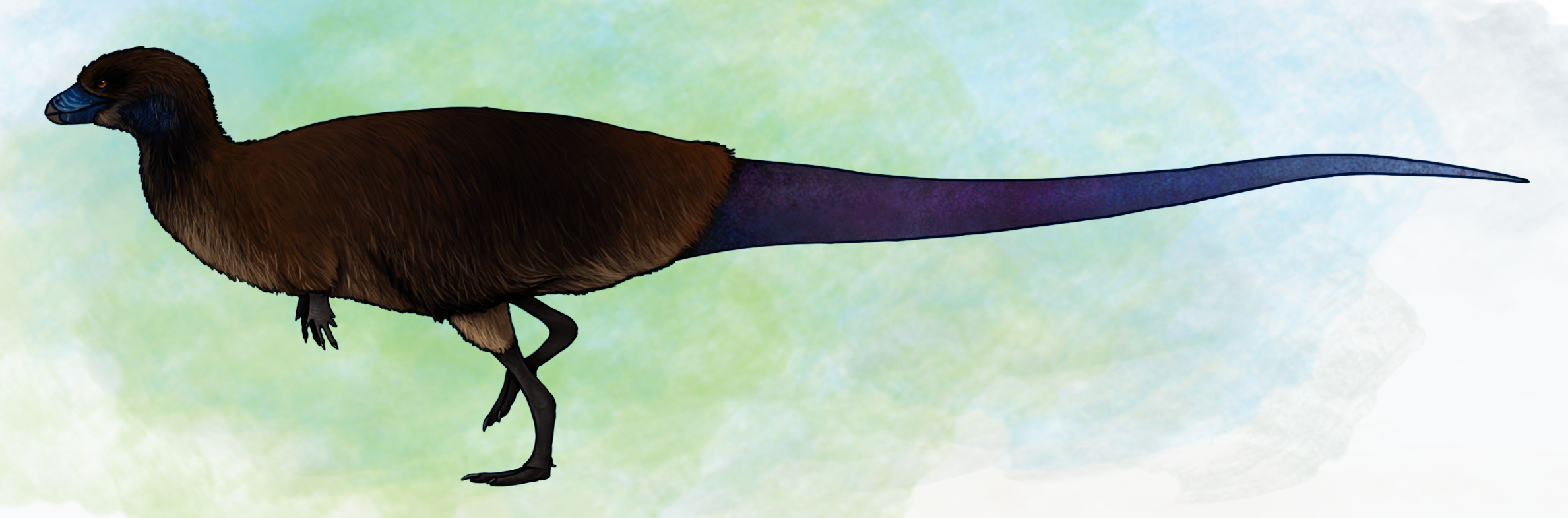
Life restoration (reconstructed with filaments) of Lesothosaurus

== Classification ==
Peter Galton considered Lesothosaurus to be a basal ornithopod in the family Fabrosauridae, which included several other ornithischians such as Nanosaurus (from the Late Jurassic of North America), Echinodon (from the Lower Cretaceous of England), and Fabrosaurus (which Galton considered distinct from Lesothosaurus but only included the holotype). However, a 1991 redescription by Paul Sereno suggested that Lesothosaurus and many other "fabrosaurids" were actually basal members of Ornithischia, one of the two main orders of Dinosauria (the other being Saurischia). This opinion has been supported by later cladistic studies of basal Ornithischia, which have also found it as the basalmost member of Neornithischia (a group that includes pachycephalosaurs, ceratopsians, and ornithopods) and related to Agilisaurus, Hexinulsaurus, and Nanosaurus. Alternatively, this dinosaur may be a very early thyreophoran, a member of the group including the armored stegosaurians and ankylosaurians.

The Butler et al., 2005 analysis placed Lesothosaurus at the base of Neornithischia:

- Euparkeria
- - Marasuchus
  - - Herrerasaurus
    - Ornithischia
      - Pisanosaurus
      - - Heterodontosauridae
        - - Eocursor
          - - Thyreophora
            - Neornithischia
              - Lesothosaurus
              - - Agilisaurus
                - - Hexinlusaurus
                  - - Othnielosaurus
                    - Cerapoda

Basal neornithischians like Lesothosaurus are known from several time periods and regions, with Nanosaurus fossils coming from the Upper Jurassic Morrison Formation (155–148 mya) of the western United States, and Hexinlusaurus from the Shaximiao Formation, dating to the Middle Jurassic (170–168 mya), in southern China. However, the phylogenetic status of basal neornithischians is constantly in a flux and some analyses have recovered these taxa as basal ornithopods or in other groups.

== Paleoenvironment ==
Lesothosaurus is known from fossils found in formations of the Karoo Supergroup, including the Upper Elliot Formation and the Clarens Formation, which date to the Hettangian and Sinemurian ages of the Lower Jurassic, around 200–190 million years ago. Originally, Lesothosaurus was thought to be from the Upper Triassic period. The Upper Elliot Formation consists of red/purple mudstone and red/white sandstone, whereas the slightly younger Clarens Formation consists of white/cream-coloured sandstone. The Clarens Formation is less rich in fossils than the Upper Elliot Formation; its sediments also often form cliffs, restricting accessibility for fossil hunters. The Upper Elliot Formation is characterised by animals that appear to be more lightly built than those of the Lower Elliot Formation, which may have been an adaptation to the drier climate at this time in southern Africa. Both formations are famous for their abundant vertebrate fossils, including temnospondyl amphibians, turtles, lepidosaurs, aetosaurs, crocodylomorphs, and non-mammal cynodonts.

Other dinosaurs from these formations include the heterodontosaurid Heterodontosaurus, the basal sauropodomorph Massospondylus, and the theropod Megapnosaurus. The Upper Elliot Formation shows the largest known heterodontosaurid diversity of any rock unit; besides Heterodontosaurus, it contained Lycorhinus, Abrictosaurus, and Pegomastax. Yet another member of the family, Geranosaurus, is known from the Clarens Formation. The high heterodontosaurid diversity have led researchers to conclude that different species might have fed on separate food sources in order to avoid competition (niche partitioning).
