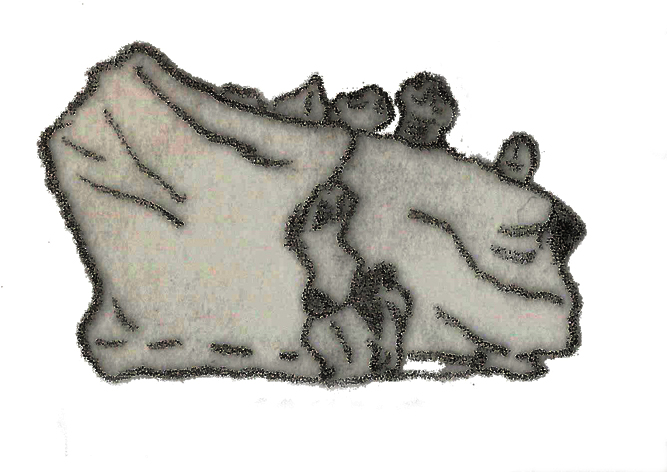
- Holotype dentary

Scientific classification
- Kingdom: Animalia
- Phylum: Chordata
- Class: Reptilia
- Clade: Dinosauria
- Clade: †Ornithischia
- Family: †Fabrosauridae
- Genus: †Fabrosaurus; Ginsburg, 1964

Type species
- †Fabrosaurus australis Ginsburg, 1964

= Fabrosaurus =

Fabrosaurus Temporal range: Early Jurassic, 199–189 Ma

Extinct genus of ornithischian dinosaurs from the early Jurassic

Fabrosaurus (/ˌfæbrəˈsɔːrəs/ FAB-rə-SOR-əs) is a dubious extinct genus of ornithischian dinosaur that lived during the Early Jurassic during the Hettangian to Sinemurian stages (199 - 189 mya).

Fabrosaurus was named and described by paleontologist Leonard Ginsburg in 1964 based on the holotype specimen, MNHN LES9, a partial jawbone with three teeth. The name Fabrosaurus means "Fabre's lizard", honoring Jean Fabre, a French geologist and a colleague of Ginsburg on the expedition that collected the fossil in Basutoland (now Lesotho). The type species, F. australis, was named for the location of the fossil in the Elliot Formation, Lesotho, Southern Africa. Fabrosaurus was initially placed within Scelidosauridae by Ginsburg, but later studies have placed it as a basal ornithischian.

Subsequent discoveries included two crushed skulls and disarticulated post-cranial bones (including vertebrae, ribs, and limb bones), allowing for a more complete reconstruction. However, as additional ornithischian fossils were discovered, the features of F. australis were thought to be shared by other species, and by the 1990s and 2000s most authors working with the group found Fabrosaurus to be a nomen dubium (doubtful name), finding the holotype material described by Ginsburg to be insufficient to distinguish a new taxon. Some claim the fossils represent simple variation of Lesothosaurus, which is regarded as a valid taxon.

== History of discovery ==
A 1959 expedition to South Africa by French palaeontologists François Ellenberger, Jean Fabre, and Leonard Ginsburg discovered remains in a fossiliferous level of the upper Red Beds of the Stormberg Group (now upper Elliot Formation) of a tritylodont and an early ornithischian, at a locality named Likhoele near Mafeteng, Basutoland (now Lesotho). Both specimens were then described by Ginsburg in 1961 and 1964 respectively, with the ornithischian being named Fabrosaurus australis. Fabrosaurus is known from a single partial jaw bone with well-preserved teeth, stored at the Muséum national d'histoire naturelle as MNHN LES9. The genus name is in honour of Jean Fabre who was part of the expedition with Ginsburg, while the species name is a reference to the country of origin. Ginsburg named Fabrosaurus for his partial jaw despite being aware that other far more complete material of early ornithischians had already been discovered from nearby localities. This more complete material was found in a 1963-1964 expedition of the University College London to Lesotho by K. Kermack and F. Mussett, and included at least three partial skulls and skeletons, NHMUK PV RUB 17 and NHMUK PV RUB 23. NHMUK PV RUB 17 was found on the north side of Likhoele Mountain, while NHMUK PV RUB 23 was from a hillside between Fort Hartley and Cutting Camp in southwest Lesotho.

These new specimens were described by Australian palaeontologist Richard Thulborn as material of Fabrosaurus in 1970, 1971 and 1972, greatly expanding the known information of the taxon and making it the best-known early ornithischian. While Ginsburg had originally considered Fabrosaurus to be a scelidosaurid, Thulborn instead identified it as a separate group of early ornithischian ("fabrosaurs"), which was named Fabrosauridae in 1972 by British palaeontologist Peter Galton. However, in 1974 British palaeontologist Alan J. Charig and South African palaeontologist Alfred W. Crompton found that the features characteristic of the holotype of Fabrosaurus, MNHN LES9, were not unique to it among early ornithischians, and that the taxon should be considered an undiagnostic nomen dubium. As a result, they removed the specimens described by Thulborn from Fabrosaurus, restricting it to its type. This led to Galton separating the more complete material as the new genus Lesothosaurus in 1978, leaving Fabrosaurus as a potentially dubious taxon restricted to its type, though he believed it could be separated from Lesothosaurus. Further material of Lesothosaurus was found by a joint expedition of the NHMUK, University of London, Yale University and South African Museum in 1967-1968 but only described later in 1984. The separation of Lesothosaurus and Fabrosaurus was disputed in 1991 by South African palaeontologist C.E. Gow, but supported by American palaeontologist Paul C. Sereno, with later authors agreeing that Fabrosaurus cannot be distinguished.
