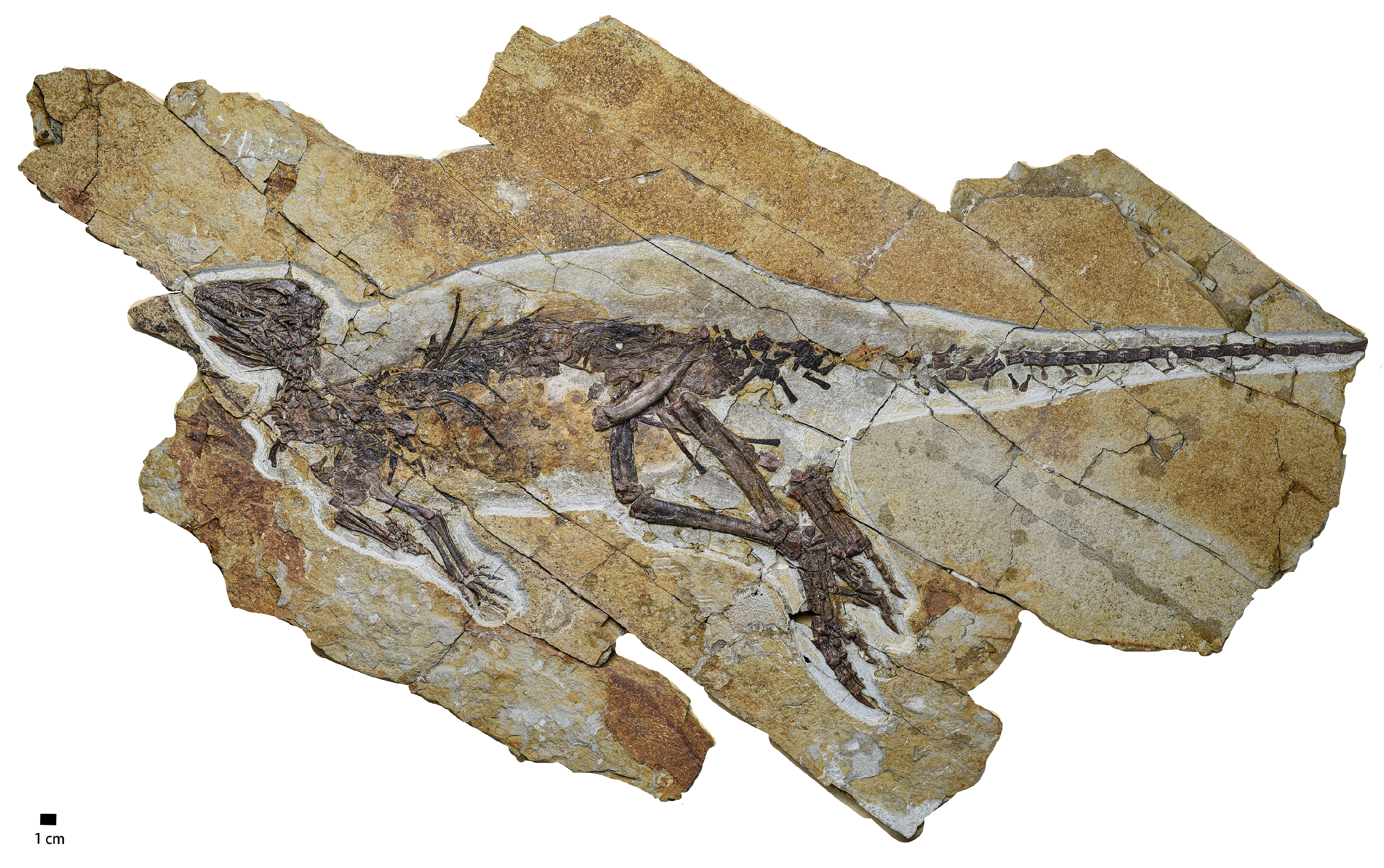
- Holotype of Pulaosaurus

Scientific classification
- Kingdom: Animalia
- Phylum: Chordata
- Class: Reptilia
- Clade: Dinosauria
- Clade: †Ornithischia
- Clade: †Neornithischia
- Genus: †Pulaosaurus; Yang, King, & Xu, 2025
- Species: †P. qinglong

Binomial name
- †Pulaosaurus qinglong Yang, Kang, & Xu, 2025

= Pulaosaurus =

Pulaosaurus Temporal range: Middle–Late Jurassic, Callovian–Oxfordian

Genus of ornithischian dinosaurs

Pulaosaurus (meaning "Pulao lizard") is an extinct genus of neornithischian dinosaur from the mid-Jurassic (Callovian–Oxfordian ages) Tiaojishan Formation of Hebei, China. The genus contains a single species, Pulaosaurus qinglong, known from a nearly complete articulated skeleton including the skull and soft tissue impressions. It is one of the only non-avian dinosaurs known to preserve a larynx (voice box), suggesting it may have made bird-like vocalizations. Pulaosaurus is the first neornithischian named from the Yanliao Biota, though members of this clade have been known from other fossil beds of the same age for much longer.

== Discovery and naming ==
The Pulaosaurus holotype, IVPP V30936, consists of a nearly complete, immature 72.2 cm (2 ft 4.4 in) long specimen including most of the skull and a nearly complete postcranium. It includes bones that are not often preserved in dinosaurs, including the hyoid bone and an ossified larynx, as well as cololites (traces of stomach contents).

Pulaosaurus was described as a new genus and species of ornithischian dinosaurs in 2025. The generic name, Pulaosaurus, refers to the Pulao, dragon in Chinese mythology said to make loud sounds, alluding to the possible bird-like vocalizations made by this taxon. The specific name, qinglong, refers to Qinglong County, Hebei, where the fossil was excavated.

== Paleobiology ==
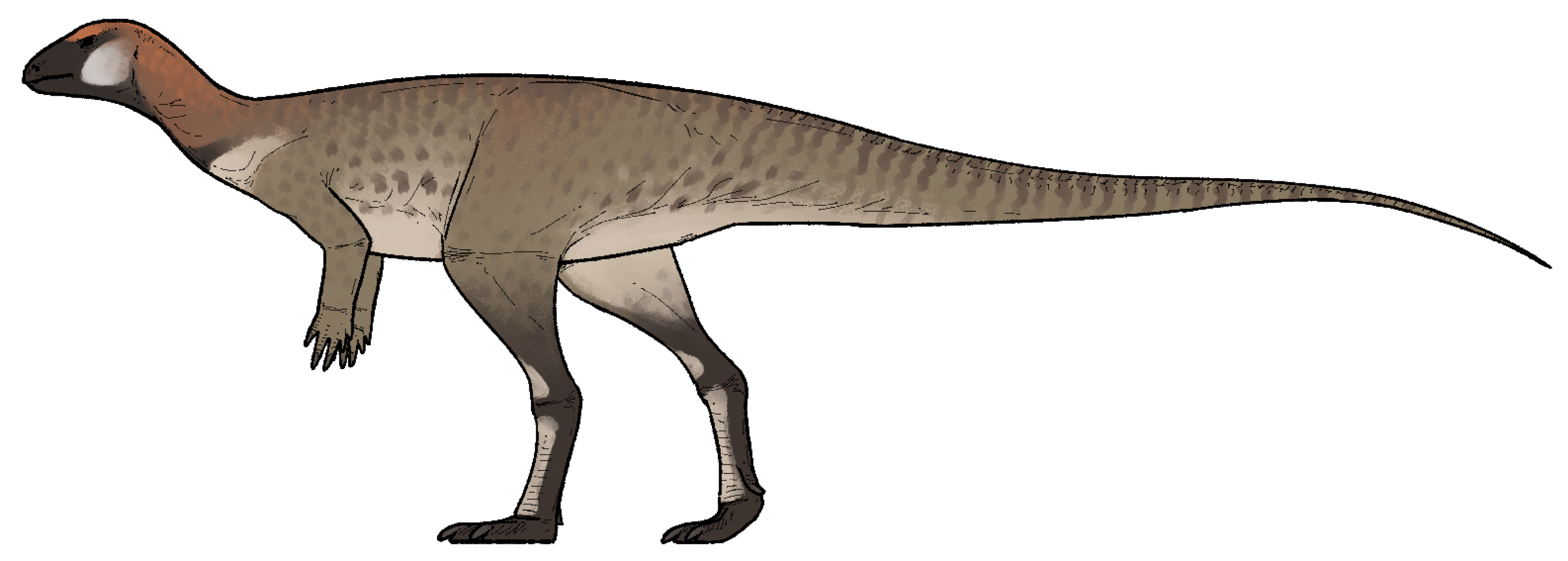
Hypothetical life restoration

The holotype preserves an ossified larynx, or voice box, which is the second time one has been found in an ornithischian, after the ankylosaur Pinacosaurus. Like the latter taxon, it suggests that Pulaosaurus probably made bird-like vocalizations. The holotype specimen preserves gut contents similar to that of the ankylosaur Minmi, which have been suggested to be plant seeds.

== Classification ==
Yang, King, & Xu (2025) performed two phylogenetic analyses to determine the relationships of Pulaosaurus. The first used the phylogenetic matrix of Han et al. (2018), focused on the relationships of basal neornithischians. The second used the matrix of Fonseca et al. (2024), which tests the relationships of ornithischians as a whole. This analysis placed Pulaosaurus as the basalmost neornithischian, followed by Agilisaurus. When running the analysis with implied weight K=12, Agilisaurus was recovered as the basalmost neornithischian, with Pulaosaurus found to be in the next-diverging clade as the sister taxon to Sanxiasaurus. A cladogram adapted from the latter analysis is shown below:

- Neornithischia
  - Agilisaurus
  - - - Minimocursor
      - - Pulaosaurus
        - Sanxiasaurus
    - - Hexinlusaurus
      - - Yandusaurus
        - - Nanosaurus
          - - Thescelosauridae
            - - Kulindadromeus
              - Cerapoda

== Paleoenvironment ==
The only known Pulaosaurus fossil was found in rocks assigned to the Tiaojishan Formation, dating to the Callovian-Oxfordian age of the Middle-Late Jurassic, dated to approximately 159 million years ago. This is the same formation (and around the same age) as the scansoriopterygids Yi, Epidexipteryx, and Scansoriopteryx. The ecosystem preserved in the Tiaojishan Formation is a forest dominated by bennettitales, ginkgo trees, conifers, and leptosporangiate ferns. These forests surrounded large lakes in the shadow of active volcanoes, ash from which was responsible for the remarkable preservation of many of the fossils. Based on the Tiaojishan's plant life, its climate would have been subtropical to temperate, warm and humid. Other vertebrate fossils found in the same rock quarry as Pulaosaurus, which would have been close contemporaries, included salamanders like Chunerpeton tianyiensis, the flying pterosaurs Changchengopterus pani, Dendrorhynchoides mutoudengensis, and Qinglongopterus guoi, dinosaurs like Tianyulong confuciusi, basal birds like Anchiornis huxleyi, Caihong juji, and Eosinopteryx brevipenna, and finally as the early gliding mammaliaform species Arboroharamiya jenkinsi.
