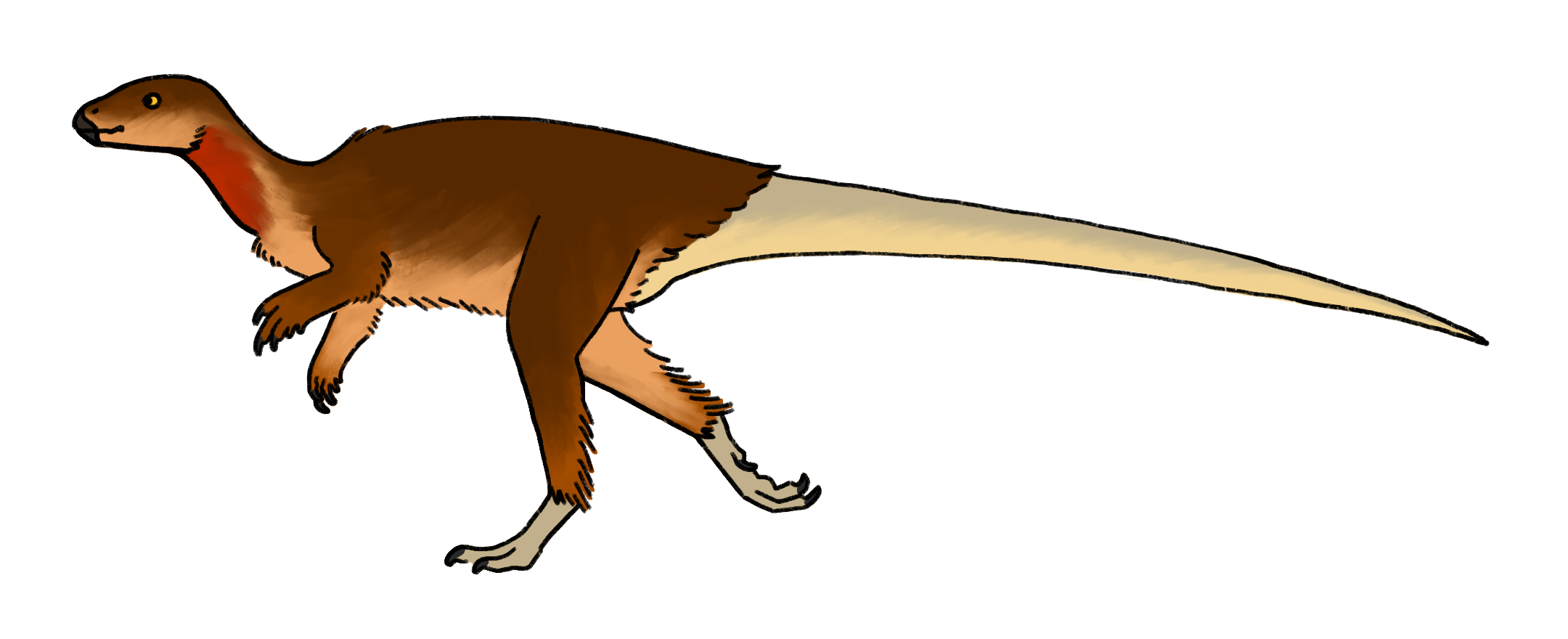
- Life reconstruction of Sanxiasaurus

Scientific classification
- Kingdom: Animalia
- Phylum: Chordata
- Class: Reptilia
- Clade: Dinosauria
- Clade: †Ornithischia
- Clade: †Neornithischia
- Genus: †Sanxiasaurus; Li et al., 2019

Type species
- †Sanxiasaurus modaoxiensis Li et al., 2019

= Sanxiasaurus =

Sanxiasaurus Temporal range: Middle Jurassic, 170 Ma

Extinct genus of dinosaurs

Sanxiasaurus (meaning "Sanxia lizard", after the Three Gorges, Chinese Sanxia, of the Yangtze River) is a genus of neornithischian dinosaur from the Middle Jurassic Xintiangou Formation in the Chongqing Municipality of China. The type and only species is S. modaoxiensis. The holotype is a partial postcranial skeleton consisting of 55 bones including two cervical vertebrae, 11 dorsal vertebrae, 4 sacral vertebrae, 18 caudal vertebrae, both humeri, radii, and ulnas, partial right ilium, partial right ischium, both femora and tibiae, left fibula, 3 metatarsi and 4 phalanges. In a phylogenetic analysis, it was found to be a basal neornithischian, more derived than Lesothosaurus and less derived than Hexinlusaurus.

== History of naming ==
In 2016 a field team from the Chongqing Bureau of Geological and Mineral Resource Exploration and Development discovered a new fossil-bearing bed in the Xintiangou Formation of Laojun Village, Yunyang County. Excavations showed that the bed was rich in fossils with multiple outcrops around Laojun Village with many vertebrate remains found. Among these was 55 bones of a partial skeleton of an early ornithischian from a 5 m (16 ft) exploratory trench, 240 m (790 ft) away from the Fossil Wall of the Lower Shaximiao Formation. The Xintiangou Formation lies between the younger Lower Shaximiao and older Ziliujing Formation, with preliminary Uranium-lead dating giving it an Aalenian to Toarcian age of between 180 and 170 million years ago, during the Middle Jurassic. The ornithischian was the first of its kind from this formation and would be the oldest yet known from Asia. These remains, CLGPR V00003, were described in 2019 as the holotype of the new taxon by Chinese palaeontologist Ning Li and colleagues: Sanxiasaurus modaoxiensis. The genus name refers to Sanxia, the Three Gorges of the Yangtze River that covers the area where the taxon was found, while the species name refers to the Yangtze tributary Modaoxi. Multiple vertebrae, both forelimbs and hindlimbs, and parts of the feet are known.

== Classification ==
Upon its description Sanxiasaurus was included in a phylogenetic analysis to assess its relationships to other early ornithischians, where it was found to group between Lesothosaurus and Hexinlusaurus and in a polytomy with Agilisaurus as a member of Neornithischia. Both of the latter genera are also from China, but from the younger Lower Shaximiao Formation making Sanxiasaurus both the oldest and most primitive neornithischian from Asia. Sanxiasaurus was found in a similar position by the analysis of Brazilian palaeontologist André Fonseca and colleagues in 2024, where it was consistently recovered more derived than Agilisaurus and either in a clade with Hexinlusaurus or unresolved, making Agilisaurus the most primitive neornithischian. Their implied-weights results are shown below.

- Neornithischia
  - Agilisaurus
  - - - Hexinlusaurus
      - Sanxiasaurus
    - - Minimocursor
      - - Nanosaurus
        - - Pyrodontia
            - Thescelosauridae
            - - Yandusaurus
              - - Kulindadromeus
                - - Cerapoda
                    - Marginocephalia
                    - Ornithopoda
