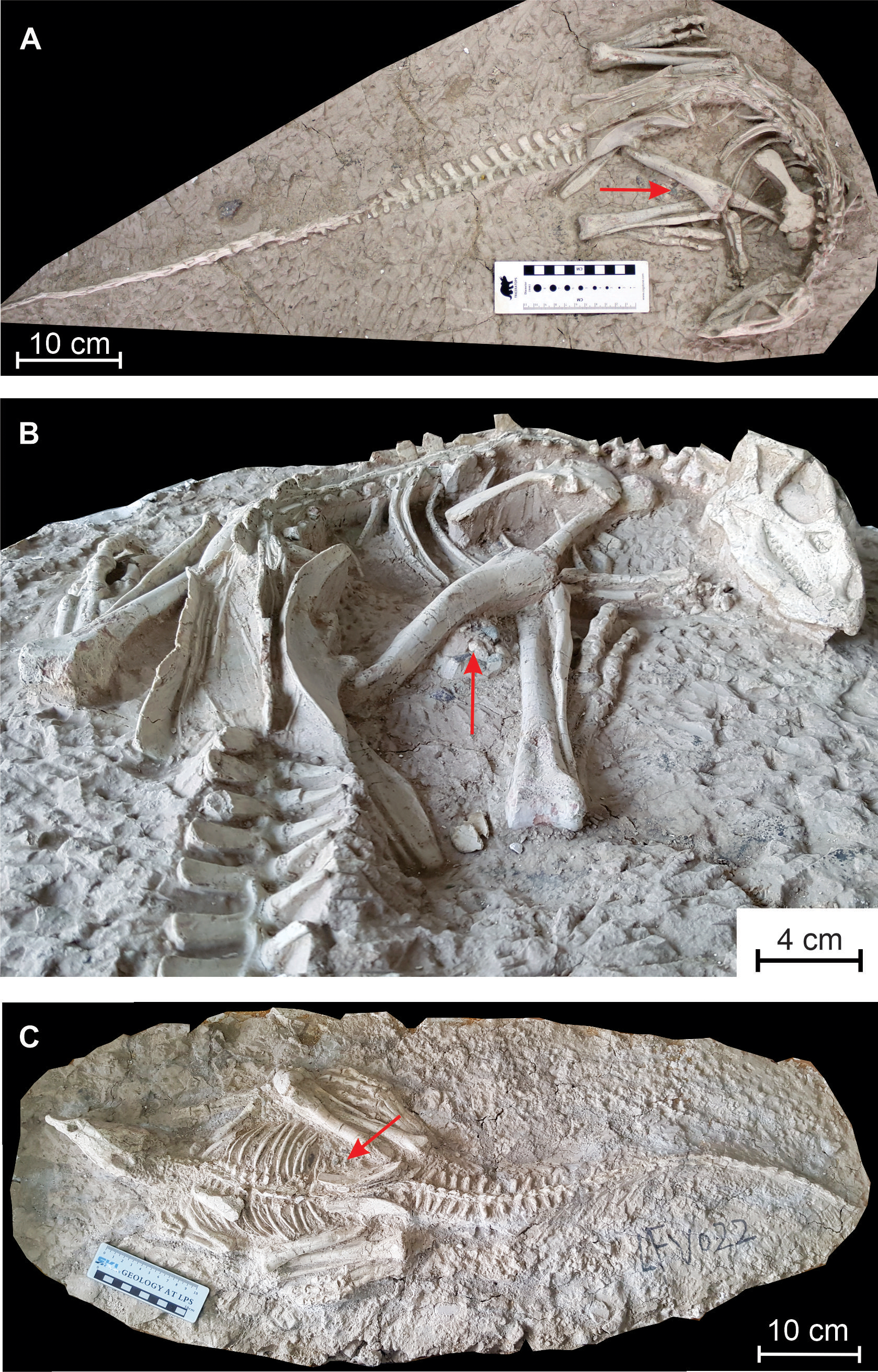
- The possible sleeping position of a Changmiania specimen

Scientific classification
- Kingdom: Animalia
- Phylum: Chordata
- Class: Reptilia
- Clade: Dinosauria
- Clade: †Ornithischia
- Clade: †Ornithopoda
- Genus: †Changmiania; Yang et al., 2020
- Species: †C. liaoningensis

Binomial name
- †Changmiania liaoningensis Yang et al., 2020

= Changmiania =

Changmiania Temporal range: Early Cretaceous, Barremian

Genus of reptiles (fossil)

Changmiania (from the Chinese "changmian", meaning "eternal sleep") is a genus of basal ornithopod dinosaur that lived in what is now China during the Early Cretaceous. It contains a single species, Changmiania liaoningensis.

== Discovery and naming ==
The taxon is represented by two near-complete articulated skeletons: the holotype specimen, PMOL AD00114; and a referred specimen, PMOL LFV022. These remains were discovered in the Barremian age, 123.2 million years old, Lujiatun Beds of the Yixian Formation by local farmers and partially prepared. They were acquired by the Paleontological Museum of Liaoning at Shenyang, which completed the preparation. No indications were found that the fossils had been tampered with by fossil thieves. The perfect life-like positions of these specimens suggest that they were buried alive, possibly in their own burrows due to a volcanic eruption.

In 2020, the type species Changmiania liaoningensis was named and described by Yang Yuqing, Wu Wenhao, Paul-Emile Dieudonné and Pascal Godefroit. The generic name is derived from 長眠 (cháng mián), "eternal sleep" in Chinese, referring to the possible sleep position the fossils were found in. The specific name refers to the provenance from Liaoning.

== Description ==
Size comparison

The holotype specimen has a preserved length of 117 centimetres.

The describing authors established some distinguishing traits. Some of these were autapomorphies, unique derived characters. The frontal bones are elongated, over four times longer than wide. The parietals do not share a midline crest. The front branch of the squamosal bone is straight and elongated. On the upper rear corner of the squamosal a distinctive boss is present. The lower edge of the dentary is convex but the edge of the angular bone is strongly concave, resulting in a sinuous profile for the lower jaw as a whole. The neural spines of the sacral vertebrae are fused into a continuous elongated plate. Both the lower and upper end of the shoulder blade is asymmetrically expanded. The paired ilia are upwards and inwards inclined, covering the sacrum in top view. The upper part of the calfbone is as robust as that of the shinbone.

The neck was very short, with only six vertebrae; other ornithischians usually have nine.

== Phylogeny ==
In their phylogenetic analysis, Yang et al. (2020) recovered Changmiania as the basalmost ornithopod. The cladogram below follows their results:

- Neornithischia
  - Agilisaurus louderbacki
  - - Hexinlusaurus multidens
    - Cerapoda
      - - Kulindadromeus zabaikalicus
        - Marginocephalia
      - Ornithopoda
        - Changmiania liaoningensis
        - - Orodrominae
            - Zephyrosaurus schaffi
            - Orodromeus makelai
            - - Yueosaurus tiantaiensis
              - Koreanosaurus boseongensis
          - - Jeholosaurinae
              - Haya griva
              - - Jeholosaurus shangyuanensis
                - Changchunsaurus parvus
            - - - Yandusaurus hongheensis
                - Nanosaurus agilis
              - Clypeodonta
                - Parksosaurinae
                  - Hypsilophodon foxii
                  - - Parksosaurus warreni
                    - Gasparinisaura cincosaltensis
                - - - Thescelosaurus assiniboiensis
                    - Thescelosaurus neglectus
                  - Iguanodontia

== Paleobiology ==
Changmiania probably dug burrows, like several other small ornithischians such as Oryctodromeus. Several of its anatomical features, such as its short neck, short forearm and hands, and enlarged shoulder bones are probably adaptations for digging.
