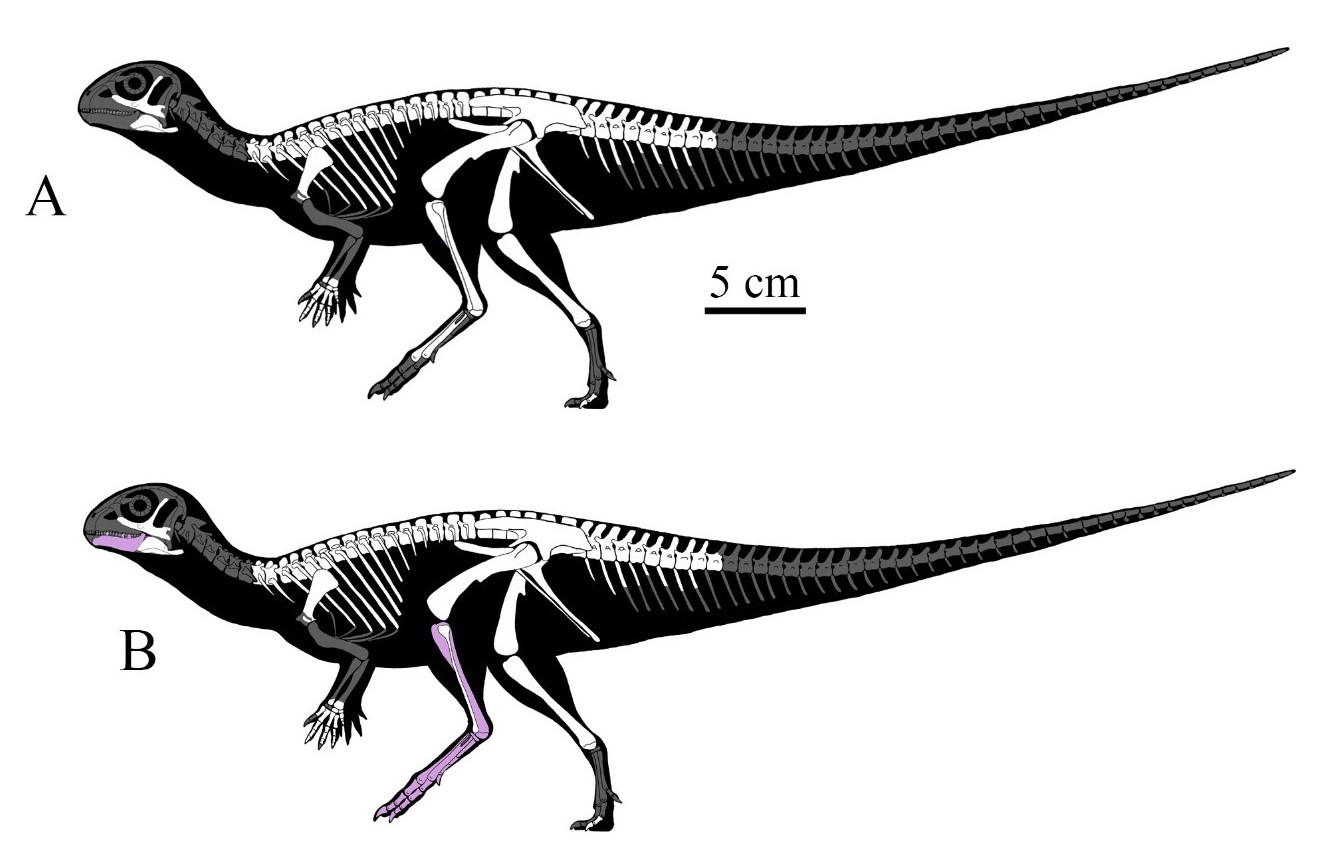
- Skeletal diagrams showing the holotype specimen (above) and the holotype with assigned elements (below)

Scientific classification
- Domain: Eukaryota
- Kingdom: Animalia
- Phylum: Chordata
- Clade: Dinosauria
- Clade: †Ornithischia
- Clade: †Neornithischia
- Genus: †Minimocursor; Manitkoon et al., 2023

Type species
- †Minimocursor phunoiensis Manitkoon et al., 2023

= Minimocursor =

Minimocursor Temporal range: Late Jurassic, Tithonian

Extinct genus of dinosaurs

Minimocursor (meaning "smallest runner") is a genus of basal neornithischian dinosaur from the Late Jurassic Phu Kradung Formation of Thailand. The type species is Minimocursor phunoiensis.

== Discovery and naming ==
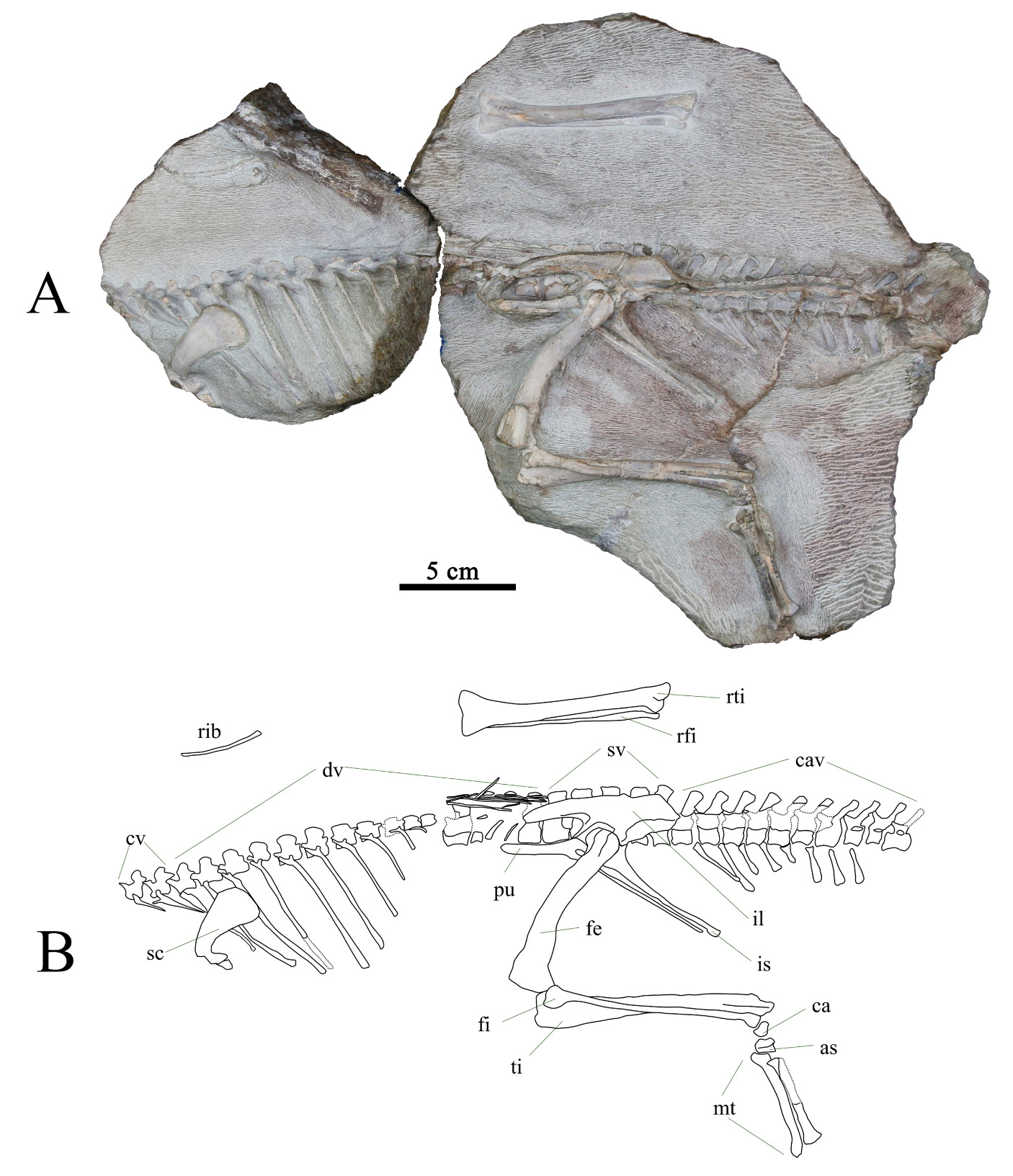
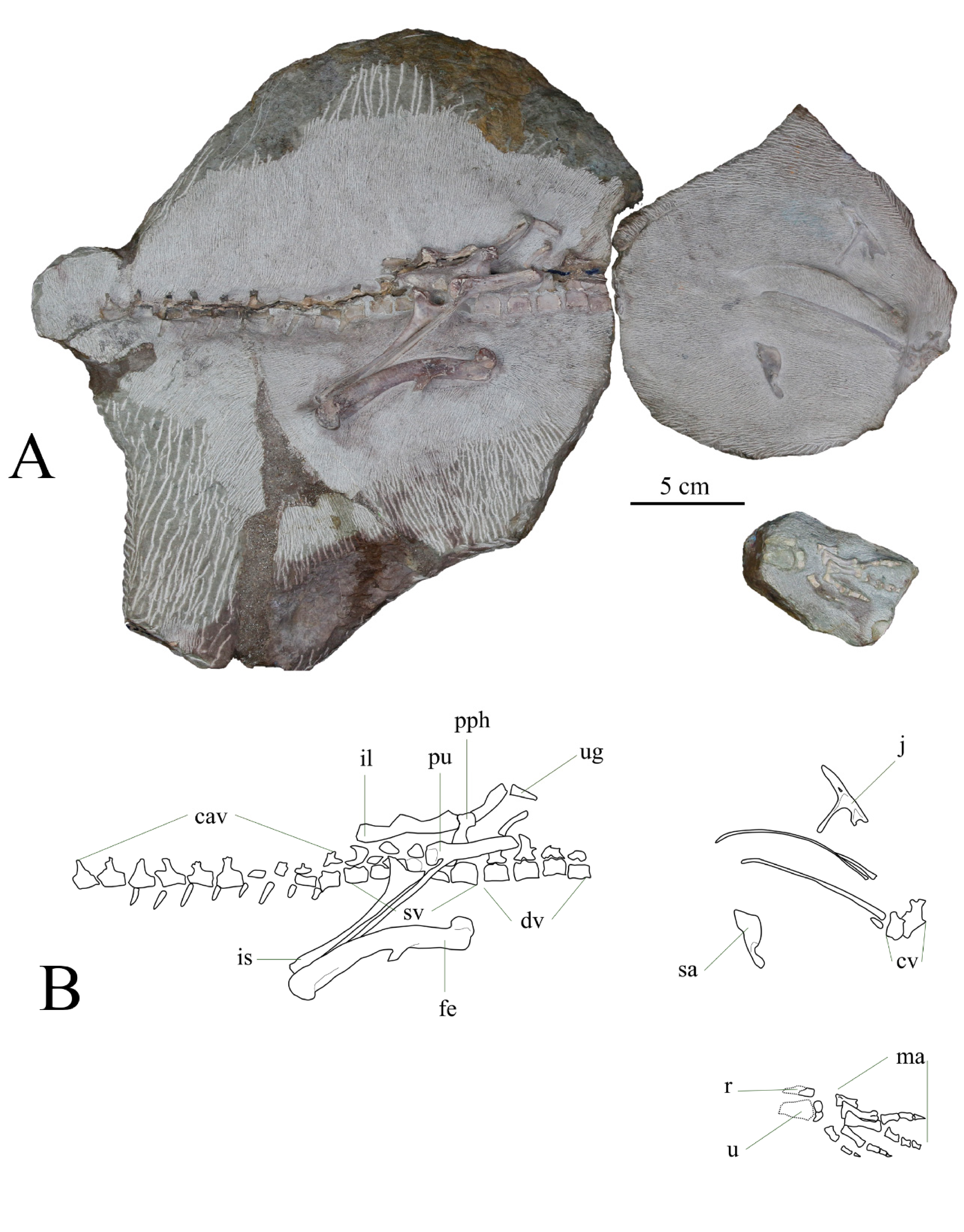
Holotype skeleton shown from the left and right

The holotype specimen, PRC 150, was excavated in 2012 and prepared for the next five years. It consists of a postcranial specimen that is more than 50% complete. Other referred specimens include an isolated dentary briefly described in 2014 and pes material. Several more specimens remain unprepared as of 2023.

These bones were considered to represent a new genus and species, Minimocursor phunoiensis, in 2023. The generic name, "Minimocursor", combines the Latin words "minimus", meaning "the smallest", in reference to the holotype's small size, and "cursor", meaning "runner". The specific name, "phunoiensis", refers to the excavation site, Phu Noi.

== Description ==
The not-fully-grown holotype has been estimated as 0.6 metres (2.0 ft) long, similar to the size of Agilisaurus. Larger remains hint that the fully-grown animal would have been 2 metres (6.6 ft) long.

== Phylogeny ==
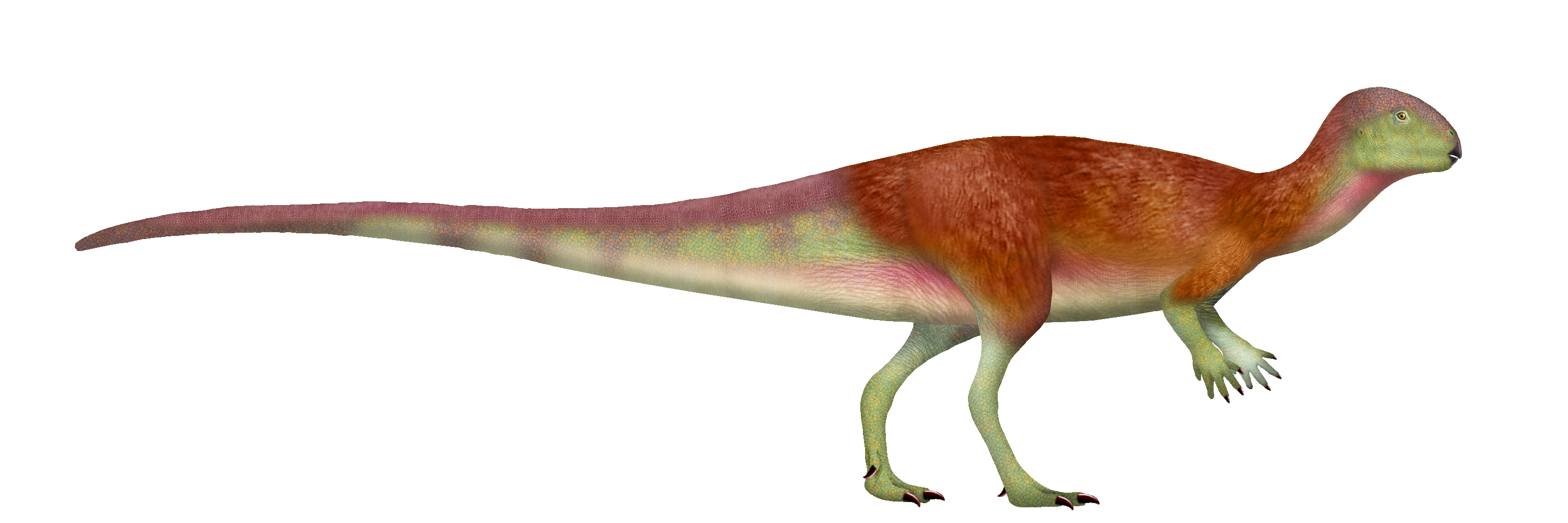
Life restoration showing protofeathers based on Kulindadromeus

Manitkoon et al. (2023) added Minimocursor to a phylogenetic analysis, adding the holotype, pes, and dentary as separate operational taxonomic units (OTUs). All three claded together at the base of the Neornithischia, outside Thescelosauridae and Cerapoda, making it the first basal neornithischian known from Southeast Asia. Their cladogram is shown below:

- Neornithischia
  - Lesothosaurus
  - - Agilisaurus
    - - - Hexinlusaurus
        - Yandusaurus
      - - Kulindadromeus
        - - Minimocursor
          - - - Jeholosaurus
              - Yueosaurus
            - - Nanosaurus
              - - Thescelosauridae
                - - Hypsilophodon
                  - Cerapoda

== Palaeoenvironment ==
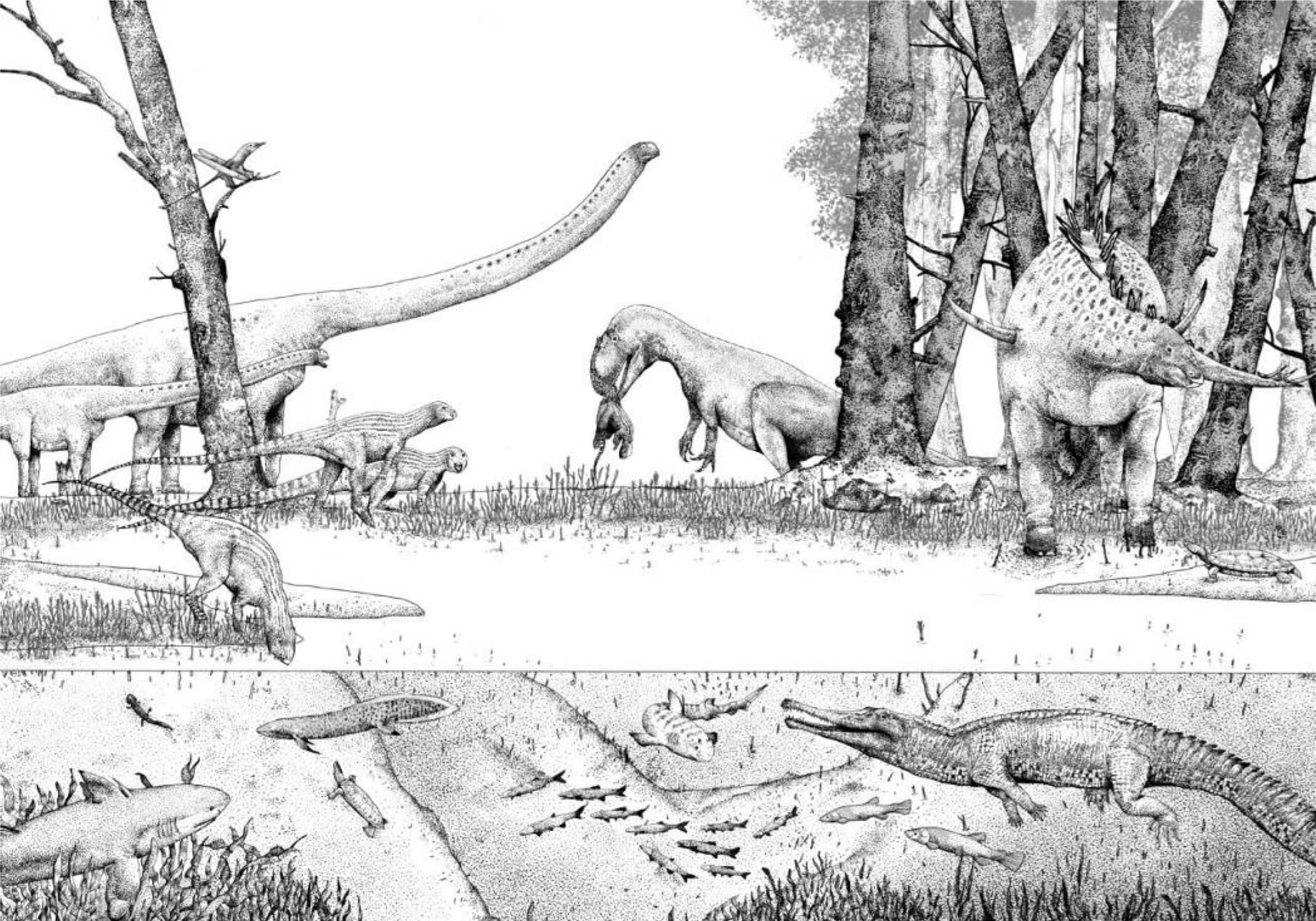
Phu Kradung Formation palaeoenvironment, with Minimocursor group at left

The Phu Kradung Formation preserves a diverse assemblage of animals. Minimocursor would have lived alongside several fish and turtles, an indeterminate pterosaur, an indeterminate stegosaur, an indeterminate metriacanthosaurid, an indeterminate mamenchisaurid, and the thalattosuchian Indosinosuchus.
