= Kulinda =

Kulinda may refer to:

- "Kulinda", the 12th episode of NCIS: Los Angeles season 8
- Kulinda, Russia, a locality in Chernyshevsky District, Zabaykalsky Krai
  - Kulinda fossil site, part of the Ukureyskaya Formation
- Kuninda Kingdom, or Kulinda, a central Himalayan kingdom from the 2nd century BCE to the 3rd century CE

== See also ==
- Kulindadromeus
