= Ukureyskaya Formation =

Geological formation in Russia

- Stratigraphic range: Bajocian–Tithonian, 169–144 Ma
- Type: Geological formation
- Sub-units: Lower, Middle and Upper subformations
- Underlies: Utanskaya Formation
- Overlies: Kulindinskaya Formation
- Thickness: Several hundred metres

Lithology
- Primary: Sandstone, siltstone, tuffite
- Other: Mudstone

Location
- Coordinates: 52.5°N 116.7°E
- Approximate paleocoordinates: 58.0°N 117.2°E
- Region: Zabaykalsky Krai
- Country: Russia
- Extent: Zabaykalsky Krai
- Ukureyskaya Formation (Russia) Ukureyskaya Formation (Zabaykalsky Krai)

The Ukureyskaya Formation, also referred to as the Ukurey Formation, is a geological formation in Zabaykalsky Krai, part of the Russian Far East. It is made up of Middle Jurassic and Late Jurassic layers. It covers large areas around Kulinda.

== History ==
The Ukureyskaya Formation was mentioned by Sinitsa & Starukhina (1986), and was first discovered by Sofia M. Sinitsa and her team from the Russian Academy of Sciences before being excavated in 2010 by a group of Russian and Belgian palaeontologists; during this time, the holotype of Kulindadromeus zabaikalicus was discovered. Excavations wrapped up in 2013 or 2014.

== Description ==
The volcanic ash layers of the Ukureyskaya Formation form a Konservat-Lagerstätte with an exceptional preservation, and it likely represents a nearshore lacustrine or estuarine-deltaic environment similar to the Yixian Formation.

In total, two bone beds were identified during the excavations that took place between 2010 and 2013/14; Bonebed 4 is older than Bonebed 3.

=== Age ===
Sinitsa & Starukhina (1986) and Sinitsa (2011) suggested that the Ukureyskaya Formation dated to the Late Jurassic-Early Cretaceous.

Godefroit et al. (2014) and Alivanov & Saveliev (2014) have suggested that as a whole, the Ukureyskaya Formation dates to the Bajocian-Tithonian, while more recent dating work by Cincotta et al. (2019) suggests that the layers containing the remains of Kulindadromeus are Bathonian in age.

== Paleofauna ==
Paleofauna of the Ukureyska Formation
Genus	Species	Location	Stratigraphic position	Material	Notes	Image
Crustacea	Indeterminate	Kulinda	"Indeterminate remains"			
Insecta	Indeterminate	Kulinda			Represented by multiple species.	
Kulindadromeus	K. zabaikalicus	Kulinda	"Base of the Ukureyska Formation"	"Hundreds of disarticulated skeletons including six skulls"	Synonyms include Daurosaurus olovus and Lepidocheirosaurus natalis.	
Ornithopoda	Indeterminate	Kulinda		"Indeterminate remains"	Represents an unnamed genus that is distinct from Kulindadromeus.	
Theropoda	Indeterminate	Kulinda		"Single tooth"	Based on undiagnostic remains.	
