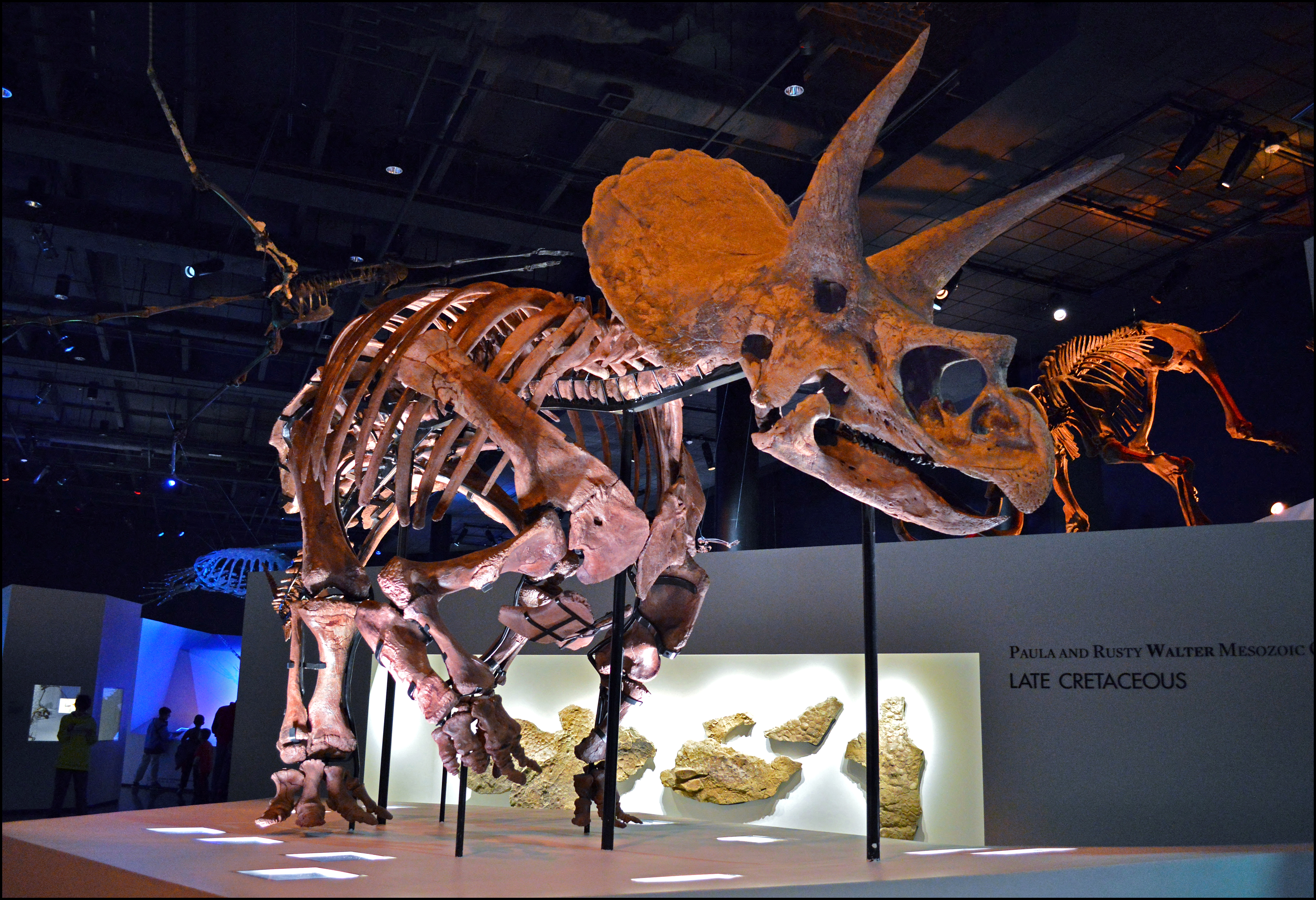
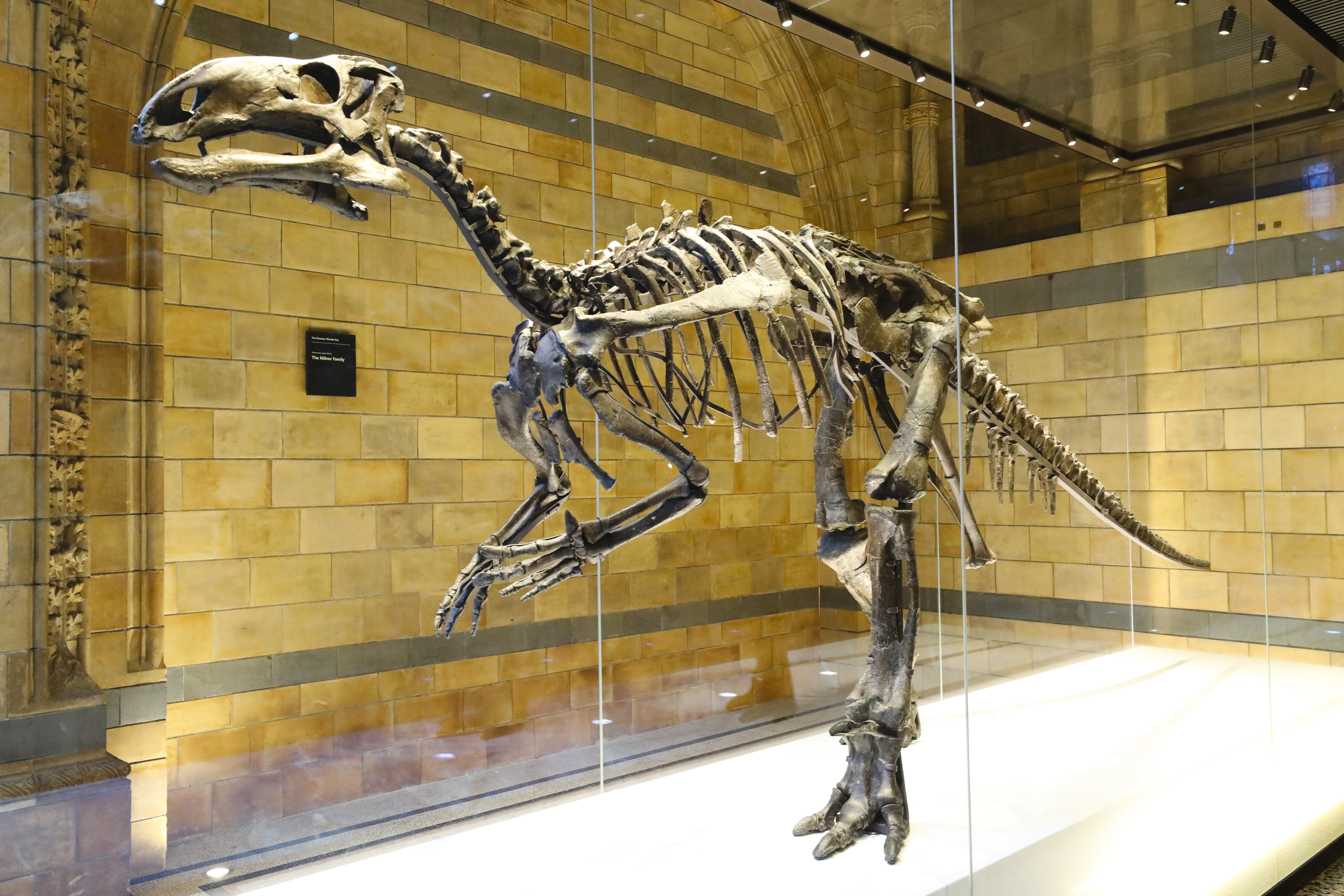
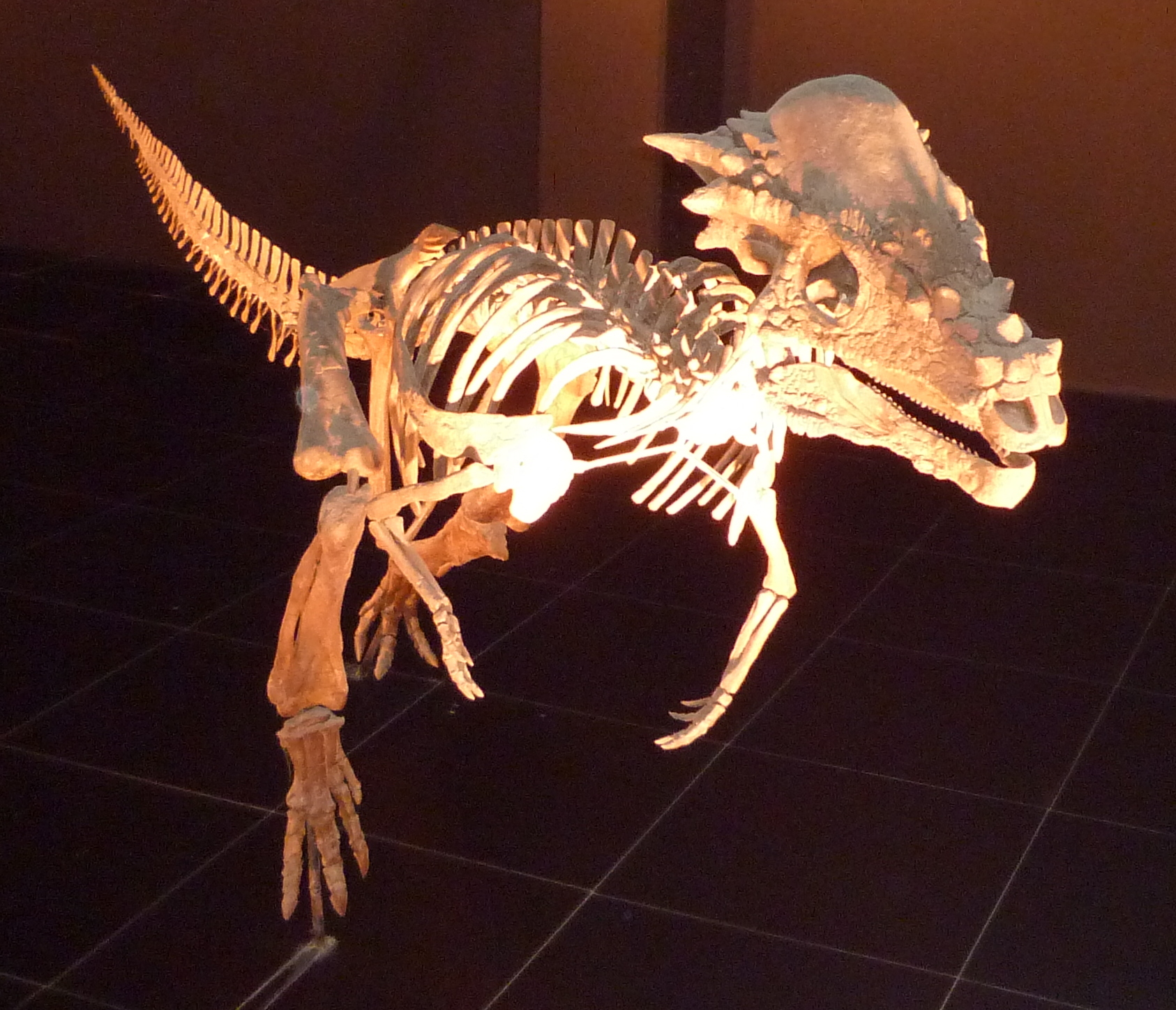
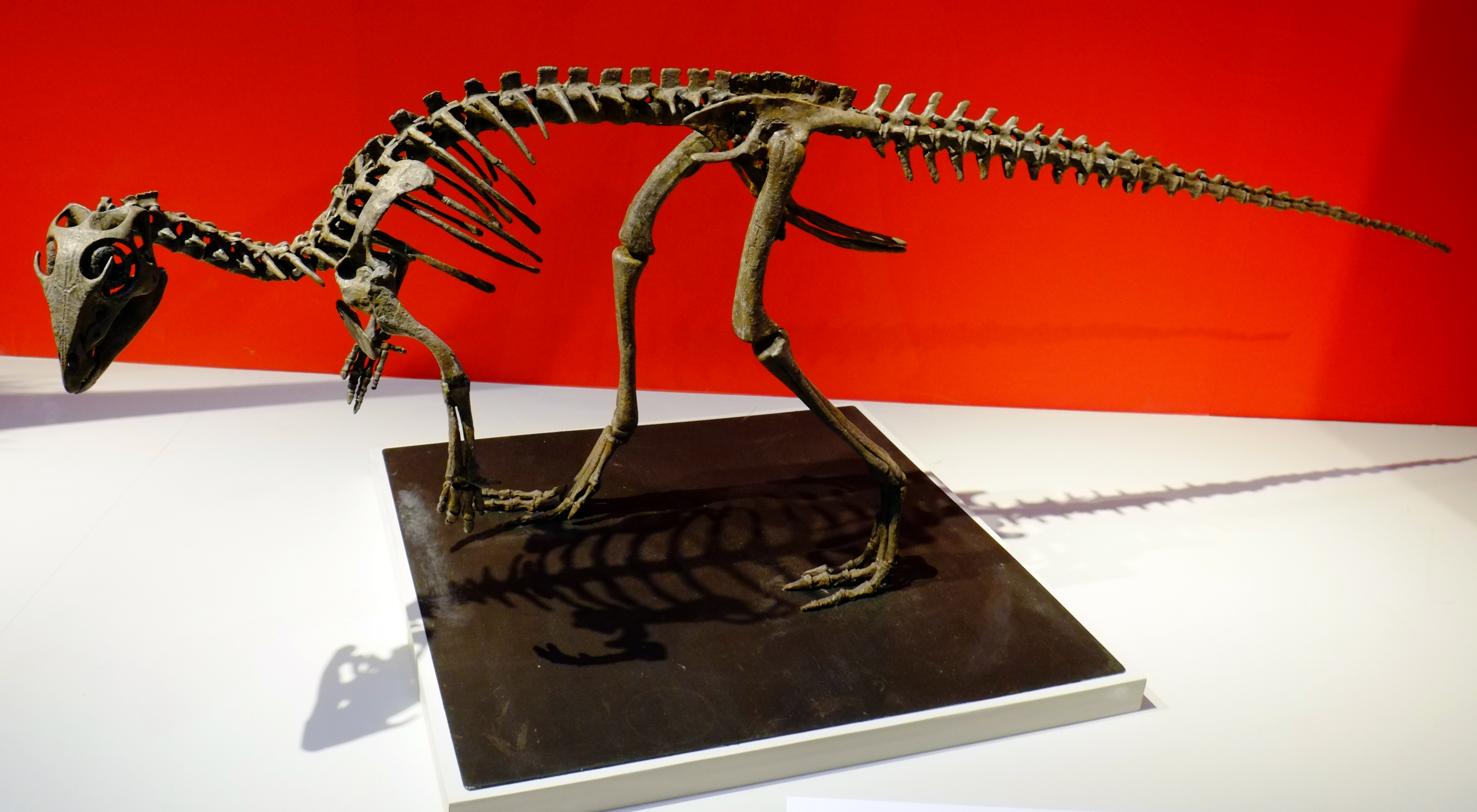
- Four neornithischians. Clockwise from top left: Triceratops (a ceratopsian), Mantellisaurus (an iguanodont), Kulindadromeus (an early neornithischian), and Pachycephalosaurus (a pachycephalosaur).

Scientific classification
- Kingdom: Animalia
- Phylum: Chordata
- Class: Reptilia
- Clade: Dinosauria
- Clade: †Ornithischia
- Clade: †Genasauria
- Clade: †Neornithischia; Cooper, 1985

Subgroups
- †Agilisaurus; †Enigmacursor; †Gongbusaurus? wucaiwanensis; †Hexinlusaurus; †Lesothosaurus?; †Minimocursor; †Nanosaurus; †Phyllodon; †Pulaosaurus; †Sanxiasaurus; †Xiaosaurus; †Yandusaurus; †Pyrodontia Fonseca et al., 2024; †Kulindadromeus; †Laosaurus? minimus; †Thescelosauridae; †Cerapoda Sereno, 1986; †Siluosaurus; †Marginocephalia; †Ornithopoda

= Neornithischia =

Neornithischians Temporal range: Middle Jurassic–Late Cretaceous, 170–66 Ma (possible Early Jurassic record)

Extinct clade of dinosaurs

Neornithischia ("new ornithischians") is a clade of the dinosaur order Ornithischia. It is the sister group of the Thyreophora within the clade Genasauria. Neornithischians are united by having a thicker layer of asymmetrical enamel on the inside of their lower teeth. The teeth wore unevenly with chewing and developed sharp ridges that allowed neornithischians to break down tougher plant food than other dinosaurs.

Neornithischians include a variety of basal forms historically known as "hypsilophodonts", including the Thescelosauridae. As these taxa do not all form a monophyletic clade, the term 'small-bodied early diverging ornithischian' (SBEDO) has been used to refer to these as a collective group. In addition, there are derived forms classified in the groups Marginocephalia and Ornithopoda. The former includes clades Pachycephalosauria and Ceratopsia, while the latter typically includes Hypsilophodon and the more derived Iguanodontia.

== Classification ==
Neornithischia was first named by Cooper in 1985 and defined as "all genasaurians more closely related to Parasaurolophus walkeri than to Ankylosaurus magniventris or Stegosaurus stenops". In 2021, Neornithischia was given a formal definition under the PhyloCode: "The largest clade containing Iguanodon bernissartensis and Triceratops horridus but not Ankylosaurus magniventris and Stegosaurus stenops."

A 2017 study by Matthew G. Baron, David B. Norman, and Paul M. Barrett recovered the Early Jurassic taxon Lesothosaurus diagnosticus from Southern Africa as the most basal known member of Neornithischia – a position previously held by Stormbergia dangershoeki (a taxon considered by the authors to be an adult form of Lesothosaurus and therefore a junior subjective synonym). However, Baron et al. go on to state that this result is only poorly supported and that future studies will be needed in order to better resolve the base of the ornithischian tree.

Pyrodontia was named by André O. Fonseca and colleagues in 2024 to unite the members of Thescelosauridae and Cerapoda. Its name translates to "fire teeth" in reference to the rapid diversification of this clade during the Middle Jurassic. The clade is formally defined in the PhyloCode as "the smallest clade containing Ceratops montanus, Iguanodon bernissartensis, Pachycephalosaurus wyomingensis, and Thescelosaurus neglectus.

Cerapoda is the most diverse clade within Neornithischia. The name "Cerapoda" is a portmanteaux of "Ceratopsia" and "Ornithopoda". As the name suggests, the clade is divided into two groups: Ornithopoda ("bird-foot") and Marginocephalia ("fringed heads"). The latter group includes the Pachycephalosauria ("thick-headed lizards") and Ceratopsia ("horned faces"). The following taxonomy follows Richard J. Butler, Paul Upchurch and David B. Norman, 2008 (and Butler et al., 2011) unless otherwise noted.

Cerapoda was first named by Sereno in 1986 and defined by him as "Parasaurolophus walkeri Parks, 1922, Triceratops horridus Marsh, 1889, their most recent common ancestor and all descendants". A similar clade Neornithopoda was tentatively proposed by David B. Norman to unite ceratopsians with advanced ornithopods in a 1984 paper. In 2021, Cerapoda was given a formal definition under the PhyloCode: "The smallest clade containing Iguanodon bernissartensis Boulenger in Beneden, 1881, Pachycephalosaurus wyomingensis (Gilmore, 1931), and Triceratops horridus Marsh, 1889."

The phylogenetic study of Fonseca and colleagues in 2024 recovered results similar to the previous analyses of Boyd and Herne and colleagues, with thescelosaurids outside Ornithopoda and heterodontosaurids outside Neornithischia, while other aspects of relationships, like the placement of Changmiania or the grouping within Ornithopoda were novel results. Their equal-weights results are below.

- Ornithischia
  - Asilisaurus
  - - Lutungutali
    - Silesaurus
    - - Technosaurus
      - - Kwanasaurus
        - - Eucoelophysis
          - - Pisanosaurus
            - - Saphornithischia
                - Heterodontosauridae
                - - Eocursor
                  - - Genasauria
                      - Thyreophora
                        - - Laquintasaura
                          - Lesothosaurus
                        - - - Emausaurus
                            - Scutellosaurus
                          - - Scelidosaurus
                            - - Yuxisaurus
                              - - Jakapil
                                - Eurypoda
                      - Neornithischia
                        - Agilisaurus
                        - - Hexinlusaurus
                          - Sanxiasaurus
                          - - Minimocursor
                            - Yandusaurus
                            - - Nanosaurus
                              - - Pyrodontia
                                  - - Thescelosauridae
                                      - Orodrominae
                                        - Zephyrosaurus
                                        - - - Orodromeus
                                            - Oryctodromeus
                                          - - Albertadromeus
                                            - Koreanosaurus
                                      - Thescelosaurinae
                                        - Yueosaurus
                                        - - Changmiania
                                          - - - Haya griva
                                              - RTMP 2008.045.0002
                                            - - - Changchunsaurus
                                                - Jeholosaurus
                                              - - Parksosaurus
                                                - Thescelosaurus
                                  - - Kulindadromeus
                                    - - Cerapoda
                                        - Marginocephalia
                                          - Pachycephalosauria
                                          - Ceratopsia
                                        - Ornithopoda
                                          - Hypsilophodontidae
                                          - - Iguanodontia
                                              - Rhabdodontomorpha
                                              - - Euiguanodontia
                                                  - - Anabisetia
                                                    - Diluvicursor
                                                  - - Gasparinisaura
                                                    - Notohypsilophodon
                                                  - Elasmaria
                                                  - - Iyuku
                                                    - Dryomorpha
