= Louderback Mountains =

Mountain range in Nevada, United States

- Location within Nevada

Highest point
- Peak: Crown Peak
- Elevation: 6,234 ft (1,900 m)
- Coordinates: 39°26′21″N 118°05′08″W

Naming
- Etymology: Named for George Louderback, geologist

Geography
- Country: United States
- State: Nevada
- Borders on: Clan Alpine Mountains

The Louderback Mountains are a very small range in central Nevada in the United States. The mountains lie in a north–south direction between Dixie Valley and the Clan Alpine Mountains. The mountains are located in Churchill County, and contain Crown Peak, elevation 6,588 feet above sea level. The Louderback Mountains lie several miles north of Highway 50. The Louderback Mountains were named in 1972 for George Louderback, a geologist who taught at University of Nevada and University of California, Berkeley.
