= Pascal Godefroit =

Belgian paleontologist

Pascal Godefroit is a Belgian paleontologist. He had described dinosaurs like Olorotitan in 2003. Godefroit is the director of earth and life sciences at the Royal Belgian Institute of Natural Sciences.

== Controversey ==
In 2018, Godefroit was criticized for suggesting in an Aguttes auction catalogue that a theropod specimen offered for sale could represent a previously unknown taxon, rather than publishing the assessment through peer review. Godefroit was also involved in the study of Ubirajara jubatus, whose description was subsequently retracted amid controversy over the fossil's export from Brazil.

In September 2026, Godefroit was suspended from the Royal Belgian Institute of Natural Sciences following an audit by the Belgian Federal Science Policy Office, and the Brussels Public Prosecutor's Office opened an investigation concerning a contract which was awarded to Raphus, a company operated by Godefroit's wife, Jonica Dos Remedios.

== Taxa contributions ==
Below is a list of taxa that Godefroit has contributed to naming:

Year	Taxon	Authors
2026	Haolong dongi gen. et sp. nov.	Huang, Wu, Mao, Bertozzo, Dhouailly, Robin, Pittman, Kaye, Manucci, He, Wang, & Godefroit
2025	Cariocecus bocagei gen. et sp. nov.	Bertozzo, Camillo, Araújo, Manucci, Kullberg, Cerio, Carvalho, Marrecas, Figueiredo, & Godefroit
2025	Shri rapax sp. nov.	Moutrille, Cau, Chinzorig, Escuillié, Tsogtbaatar, Ganzorig, Mallet, & Godefroit
2024	Libanissus bkassinensis gen. et sp. nov.	Azar, Maksoud, Robin, Godefroit, Cavin, Olive, Rey, Vallée, Brito, Heneine, & Nel
2021	Garrigatitan meridionalis gen. et sp. nov.	Díez Díaz, Garcia, Superbiola, Jentgen-Ceschino, Stein, Godefroit, & Valentin
2020	Changmiania liaoningensis gen. et sp. nov	Yuqing Yang, Wenhao Wu, Paul-Emile Dieudonné, & Godefroit
2017	Halszkaraptor escuilliei gen. et sp. nov.	Cau, Beyrand, Voeten, Fernandez, Tafforeau, Stein, Barsbold, Tsogtbaatar, Currie, & Godefroit
2017	Serikornis sungei gen. et sp. nov.	Lefèvre, Cau, Cincotta, Hu, Chinsamy, Escuillié, & Godefroit
2017	Matheronodon provincialis gen. et sp. nov.	Godefroit, Garcia, Gomez, Stein, Cincotta, Lefèvre, & Valentin
2017	Mistralazhdarcho maggii gen. et sp. nov.	Vullo, Garcia, Godefroit, Cincotta, & Valentin
2014	Leninia stellans gen. et sp. nov.	Fischer, Arkhangelsky, Uspensky, Stenshin, & Godefroit
2014	Sisteronia seeleyi gen. et sp. nov.	Fischer, Bardet, Guiomar, & Godefroit
2014	Jeholornis curvipes sp. nov.	Lefèvre, Hu, Escuillié, Dyke, & Godefroit
2014	Kulindadromeus zabaikalicus gen. et sp. nov.	Godefroit, Sinitsa, Dhouailly, Bolotosky, Sizom, Mcnamara, Benton, & Spagna
2013	Mistralestes arcensis gen. et sp. nov.	Tabuce, Tortosa, Vianey-Liaud, Garcia, Lebrun, Godefroit, Dutour, Berton, Valentin, & Cheylan
2013	Malawania anachronus gen. et sp. nov.	Fischer, Appleby, Naish, Liston, Riding, Brindle, & Godefroit
2013	Aurornis xui gen. et sp. nov.	Godefroit, Cau, Dong-Yu, Escuillié, Wenhao, & Dyke
2013	Eosinopteryx brevipenna gen. et sp. nov.	Godefroit, Demuynck, Dyke, Hu, Escuillié, & Claeys
2012	Hexing qingyi gen. et sp. nov.	Liyong, Jun, & Godefroit
2012	Kundurosaurus nagornyi gen. et sp. nov.	Godefroit, Bolotsky, & Lauters
2011	Sveltonectes insolitus gen. et sp. nov.	Fischer, Masure, Arkhangelsky, & Godefroit
2011	Samrukia nessovi gen. et sp. nov.	Naish, Dyke, Cau, Escuillié, & Godefroit
2010	Koreanosaurus boseongensis gen. et sp. nov.	Huh, Lee, Kim, Lim, & Godefroit
2010	Bolong yixianensis gen. et sp. nov.	Wu, Hu, & Godefroit
2010	Paludititan nalatzensis gen. et sp. nov.	Csiki, Codrea, Jipa-Murzea, & Godefroit
2009	Helioceratops brachygnathus gen. et sp. nov.	Jin, Chen, Zan, & Godefroit
2008	Velociraptor osmolskae sp. nov.	Godefroit, Currie, Hong, Yong, & Dong
2008	Wulagasaurus dongi gen. et sp. nov.	Godefroit, Shulin, Tingxiang, & Lauters
2005	Penelopognathus weishampeli gen. et sp. nov.	Godefroit, Li, & Shang
2004	Kerberosaurus manakini gen. et sp. nov.	Bolotsky & Godefroit
2003	Olorotitan arharensis gen. et sp. nov.	Godefroit, Bolotsky, & Alifanov
2000	Charonosaurus jiayinensis gen. et sp. nov.	Godefroit, Zan, & Jin
1999	Pinacosaurus mephistocephalus sp. nov.	Godefroit, Pereda Superbiola, and Dong

== See also ==
- Taxa named by Pascal Godefroit
