= George Louderback =

American geologist (1874–1957)

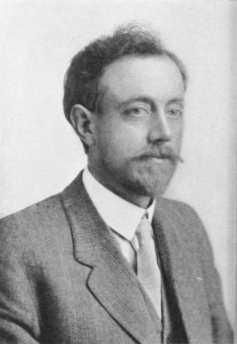
- Born: George Davis Louderback; April 6, 1874; San Francisco, California
- Died: January 27, 1957 (aged 82); Berkeley, California
- Education: UC Berkeley
- Occupation: Geologist
- Spouse: Clara Augusta Henry (m. 1899)

George Davis Louderback (April 6, 1874 – January 27, 1957) was an American geologist, known for identifying and describing benitoite and joaquinite.

== Biography ==
Louderback was born in San Francisco, and received an A.B. from the University of California, Berkeley in 1896, followed by a Ph.D. in 1899. He married Clara Augusta Henry on October 3, 1899.

He was a teaching assistant in mineralogy at UC Berkeley in 1897–1900 and then taught at the University of Nevada in 1900–1906. At UC Berkeley's department of geology, Louderback became an assistant professor in 1906, an associate professor in 1907, and a full professor in 1917. In Nevada, Louderback studied the geological structure of the Great Basin, especially of the Basin ranges, and Nevada's gypsum deposits. He did research on the Mesozoic formations of southern Oregon, the relation of radioactivity to vulcanism, the glaucophane of the Pacific Coast Ranges, and the stratigraphy of Mount Diablo. He also studied the effects of the 1906 San Francisco earthquake and sedimentation in San Francisco Bay. In 1914–1916 Louderback led an expedition searching for petroleum reservoirs in the interior of China; after the expedition, in 1916 he also searched for petroleum in the Philippine Islands.

He was a member of the Seismological Society of America and its president in 1914 and again in 1929–1935. He died in Berkeley, California on January 27, 1957, aged 82.

In 1972, the Louderback Mountains in central Nevada were named for Louderback.

== Selected publications ==
- Pseudostratification in Santa Barbara county, California. 1912; 38 pages
- Period of scarp production in the Great Basin. 1924; 44 pages
- Morphologic features of the Basin range displacements in the Great basin. 1926; 42 pages
- Stratigraphic relations of the Jung Hsien fossil dinosaur in the Szechuan red beds of China. 1935; 8 pages
