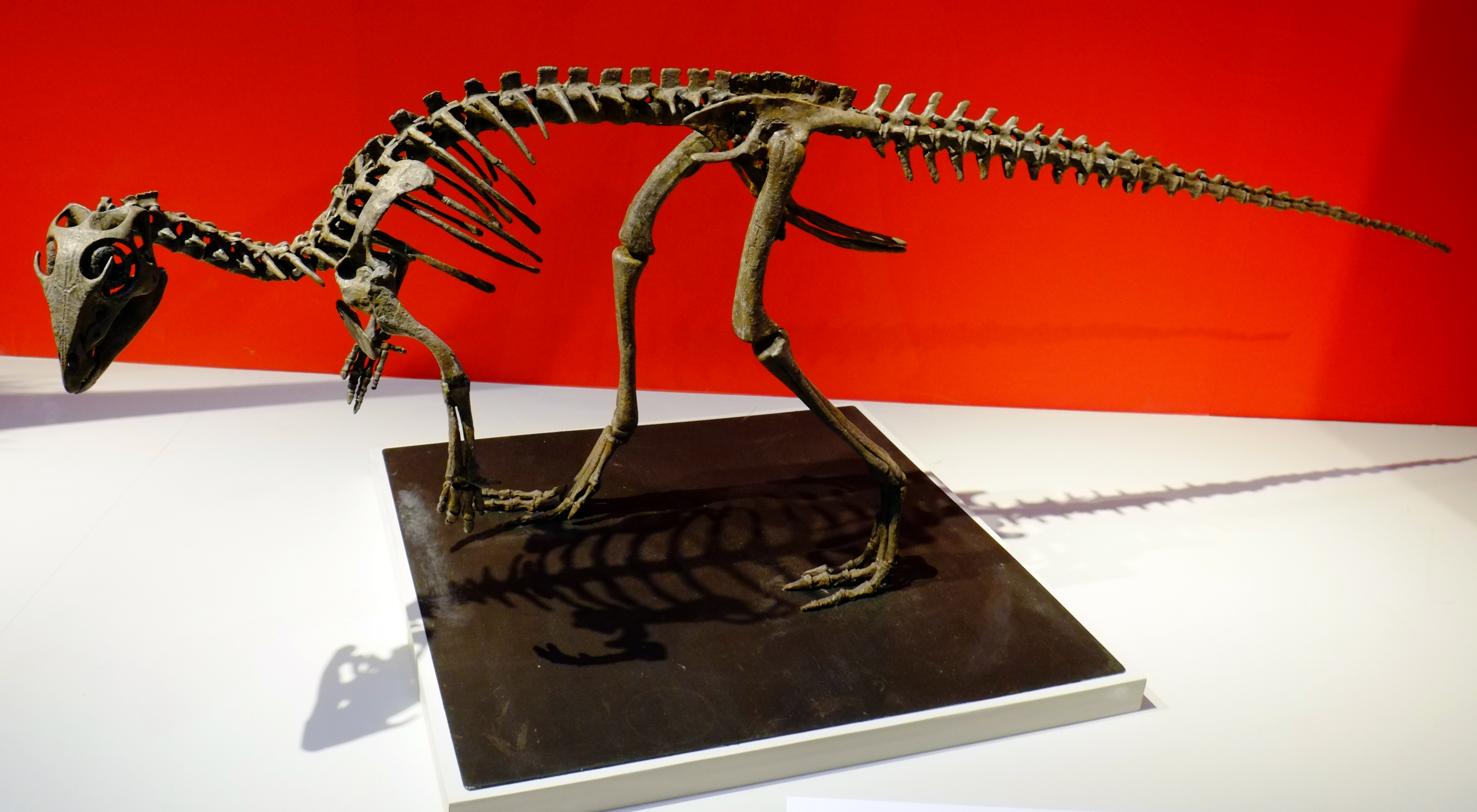
- Reconstructed mounted skeleton

Scientific classification
- Kingdom: Animalia
- Phylum: Chordata
- Class: Reptilia
- Clade: Dinosauria
- Clade: †Ornithischia
- Clade: †Pyrodontia
- Genus: †Kulindadromeus; Godefroit et al., 2014

Type species
- †Kulindadromeus zabaikalicus Godefroit et al., 2014

Synonyms
- Kulindapteryx ukureica Alifanov and Saveliev, 2014; Daurosaurus olovus Alifanov and Saveliev, 2014; Lepidocheirosaurus natatilis Alifanov and Saveliev, 2015

= Kulindadromeus =

Kulindadromeus Temporal range: Bathonian, 168.3–166.1 Ma

Extinct genus of dinosaurs

Kulindadromeus is a genus of basal neornithischian dinosaur that lived during the Middle Jurassic. The first Kulindadromeus fossil was found in Russia. Its feather-like integument is evidence for protofeathers being basal to Ornithischia and possibly Dinosauria as a whole, rather than just to Coelurosauria, as previously suspected.

== Discovery and naming ==
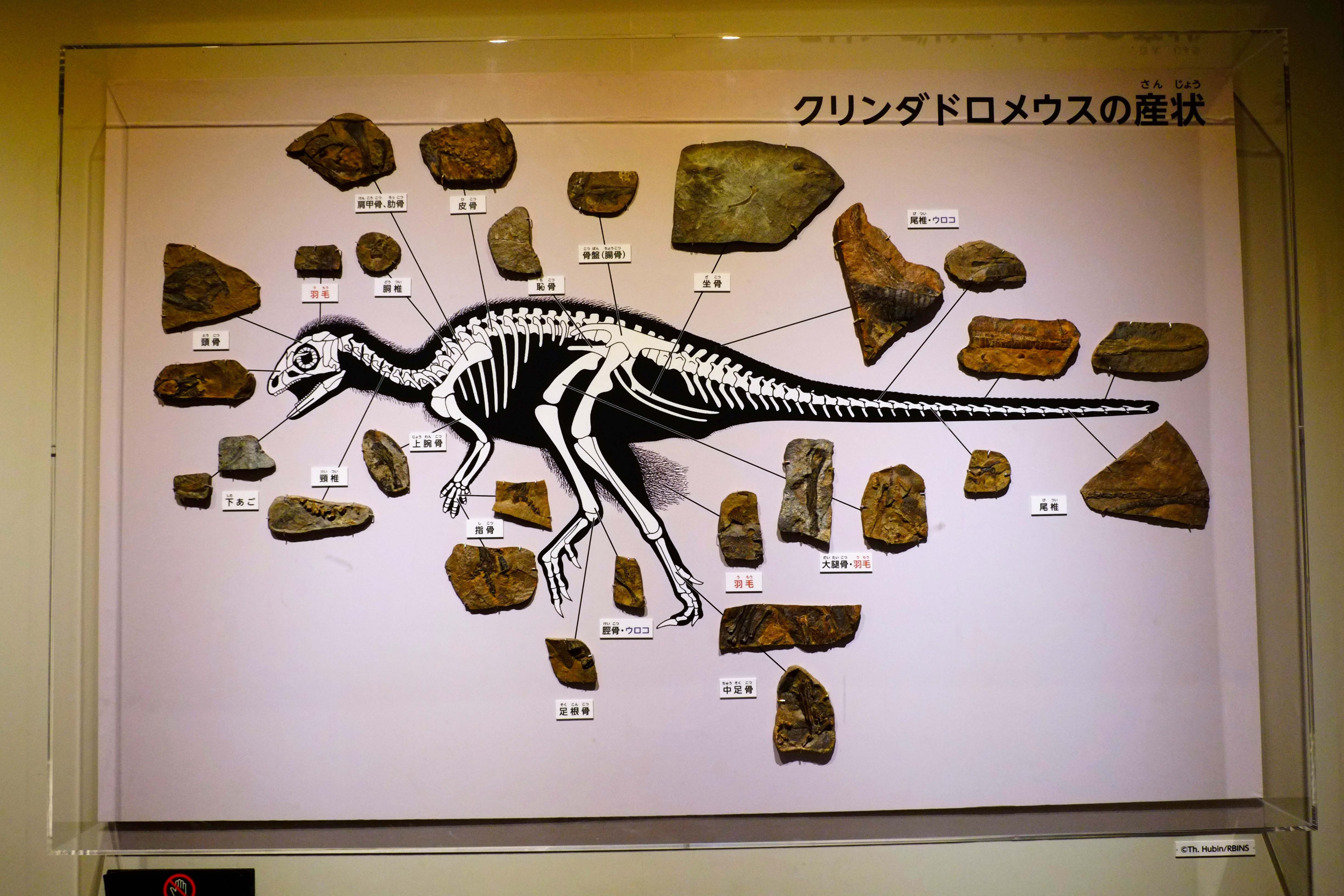
Fossil elements

In 2014, the type species Kulindadromeus zabaikalicus was named and described by Pascal Godefroit, Sofia Sinitsa, Danielle Dhouailly, Yuri Bolotsky, Alexander Sizov, Maria McNamara, Michael Benton, and Paul Spagna. The generic name is derived from the Kulinda sites and Classical Greek δρομεύς, dromeus, "runner". The specific name refers to the Zabaykalsky Krai.

The holotype, INREC K3/109, was found in a layer of the Ukureyskaya Formation dating from the Middle to Late Jurassic, Bajocian-Tithonian, with the specific bed likely dating to the Bathonian stage of the Middle Jurassic, between 168 and 166 million years ago. It consists of a partial skull with lower jaws. The volcanic ash layers of the formation form a Konservat-Lagerstätte with an exceptional preservation. Since 2010, the area has brought forth considerable amounts of additional fossil material, including subadult and juvenile individuals. In 2014, based on fossils from this material, the genera Kulindapteryx and Daurosaurus were named. According to Godefroit, this publication was based on stolen specimens, and should be ignored. The material consists of six skulls, and hundreds of disarticulated skeletons found in two bone beds. Each skeletal element shows a single morphotype and Godefroit et al. concluded, contrary to the earlier publication, that the bone beds are monospecific, containing but a single species.

== Description ==
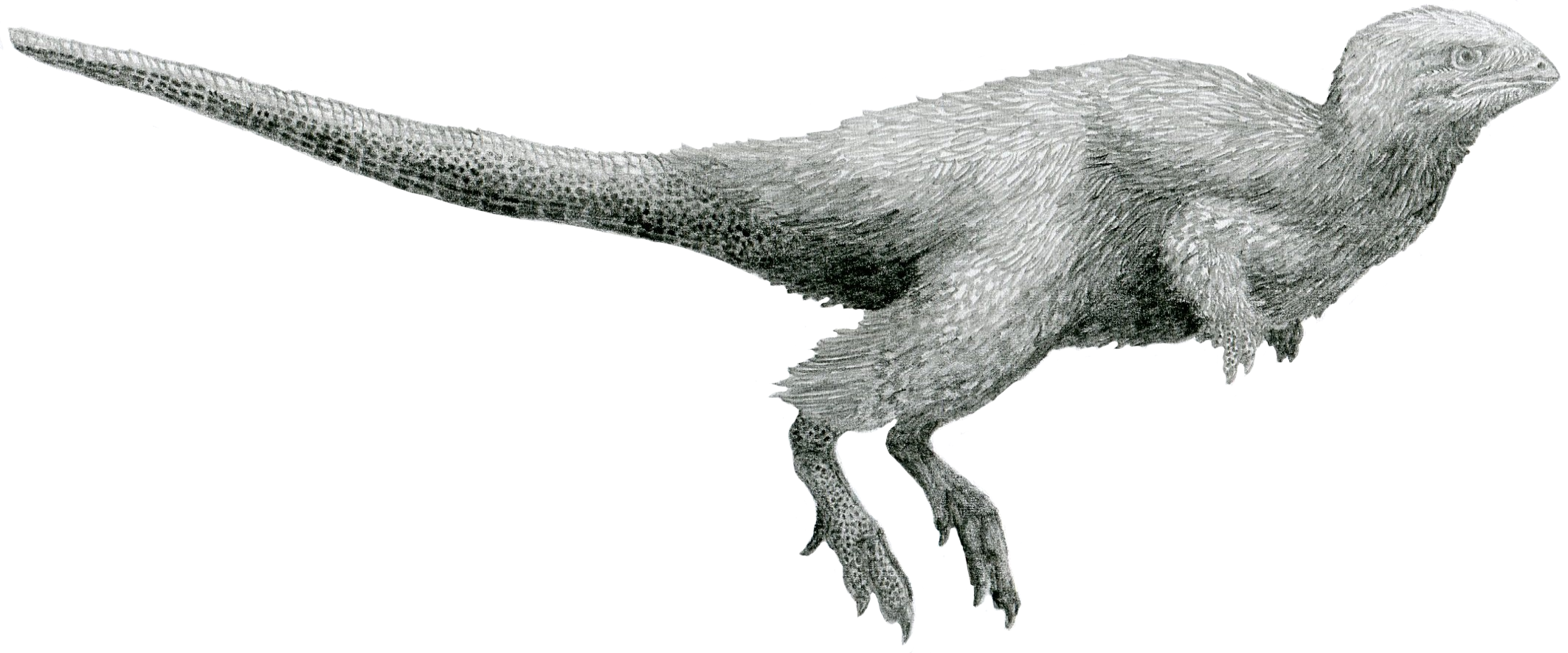
Reconstruction of Kulindadromeus showing integument patterns preserved on the fossils

Kulindadromeus was a small ornithischian, measuring 1–1.5 metres (3.3–4.9 ft) long and weighing 2 kilograms (4.4 lb). Like other early neornithischians, Kulindadromeus was a bipedal runner, with a short head, short forelimbs, long hindlimbs and a long tail.

The describers of Kulindadromeus established some distinguishing traits. The front ascending branch of the maxilla is much lower than the rear ascending branch. The fenestra maxillaris is larger than the antorbital fenestra, the usually more extensive skull opening in the snout side. The branch of the jugal towards the postorbital is notched. The postorbital has a rear branch that is vertically expanded. The rear blade of the ilium is slender in side view. The second, third and fourth metatarsals have deep grooves for the tendons of the extensor muscles.

Various specimens of Kulindadromeus show large parts of its integument. This includes imbricated rows of scales on top of its tail and also a covering of scales branching into feather-like structures, which until its discovery were thought to be exclusive to the Theropoda, of the saurischian line. The feather remains discovered are of three types, adding a level of complexity to the evolution of feathers in dinosaurs. The first type consists of hair-like filaments covering the trunk, neck and head. These are up to three centimetres long and resemble the stage 1 "dino-fuzz" already known from theropods like Sinosauropteryx. The second type is represented by groups of six or seven downwards-projecting filaments up to 1.5 centimetres long, originating from a base plate. These are present on the upper arm and thigh. They resemble the type 3 feathers of theropods. The base plates are ordered in a hexagonal pattern but do not touch each other. The third type is unique. It was found on the upper lower legs and consists of bundles of six or seven ribbon-like structures, up to two centimetres long. Each ribbon is constructed from about ten parallel filaments up to 0.1 millimetres wide.

There are also three types of scales. Overlapping hexagonal scales, up to 3.5 millimetres in diameter, are present on the lower shins. Small round non-overlapping scales, less than one millimetre in cross-section, cover the hands, ankles and feet. The top of the tail is covered by five longitudinal rows of arched rectangular scales, measuring up to one by two centimetres. With these scales the trailing edge of each scale slightly overlaps the front edge of the scale behind it. In the middle, to the contrary, a small spur projects forward, covering the trailing edge of the preceding scale. This way an imbricated row is formed. The scale surface is smooth and the thickness is limited, less than 0.1 millimetres. The authors considered it unlikely these structures were ossified scutes or osteoderms. Towards the rear of the tail, the scales become smaller and more rounded; they then no longer overlap each other.

The specimens assigned to Daurosaurus and Kulindapteryx also include preserved integument on the humerus: "oval platy scales" and bristles. The latter reportedly has longer bristles.

== Classification ==
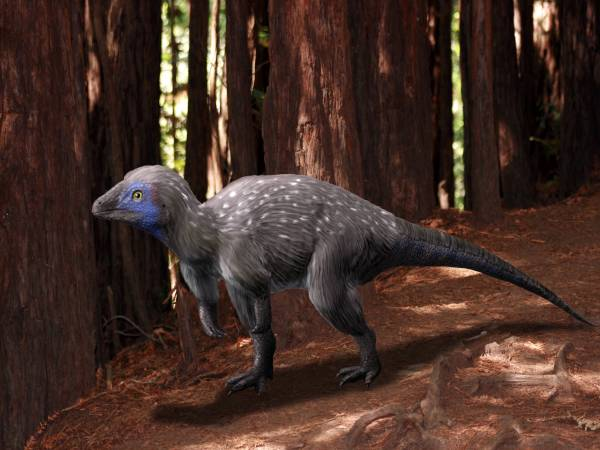
Restoration

According to a cladistic analysis performed by the describing authors, Kulindadromeus is a basal member of the Neornithischia, placed just above Hexinlusaurus in the evolutionary tree. It is the sister species of the Cerapoda.

- Heterodontosauridae
- - Eocursor
  - - Lesothosaurus
    - Thyreophora
    - Neornithischia
      - Stormbergia
      - - Agilisaurus
        - - Hexinlusaurus
          - - Cerapoda
            - Kulindadromeus

=== Implications ===
Godefroit et al. concluded that the filaments earlier reported in Ornithischia, with Psittacosaurus and Tianyulong, could be homologous to the "protofeathers" found in non-avian theropods. With known feather-like structures in pterosaurs, there is evidence for it being basal to Ornithodira. An attempt to reconstruct the likely ancestral state of dinosaurs found it to be likely that both Ornithodira and Dinosauria were ancestrally scaly, however, this result was only obtained when assuming that early pterosaurs were scaly.

A comment on Godefroit et al. argues that the filamentous structures described at Kulindadromeus do not resemble protofeathers, rather they suggest it to be degraded collagen fibers. Pascal Godefroit and colleagues reply, "If, according to Lingham-Soliar's hypothesis, those filaments represent collagen fibers or fiber bundles, it is surprising that they are not preserved in the numerous (more than 20) partial or whole tails of Kulindadromeus, given that the tail should have contained particularly high amounts of collagen for structural support. Moreover, Lingham-Soliar fails to explain how scales should be selectively degraded and/or dislocated around the humerus and femur but never around the distal tibia and tail." Further, they state that the described morphology of the integument are not consistent with degraded collagen fibers, as the filaments are widely spaced.
