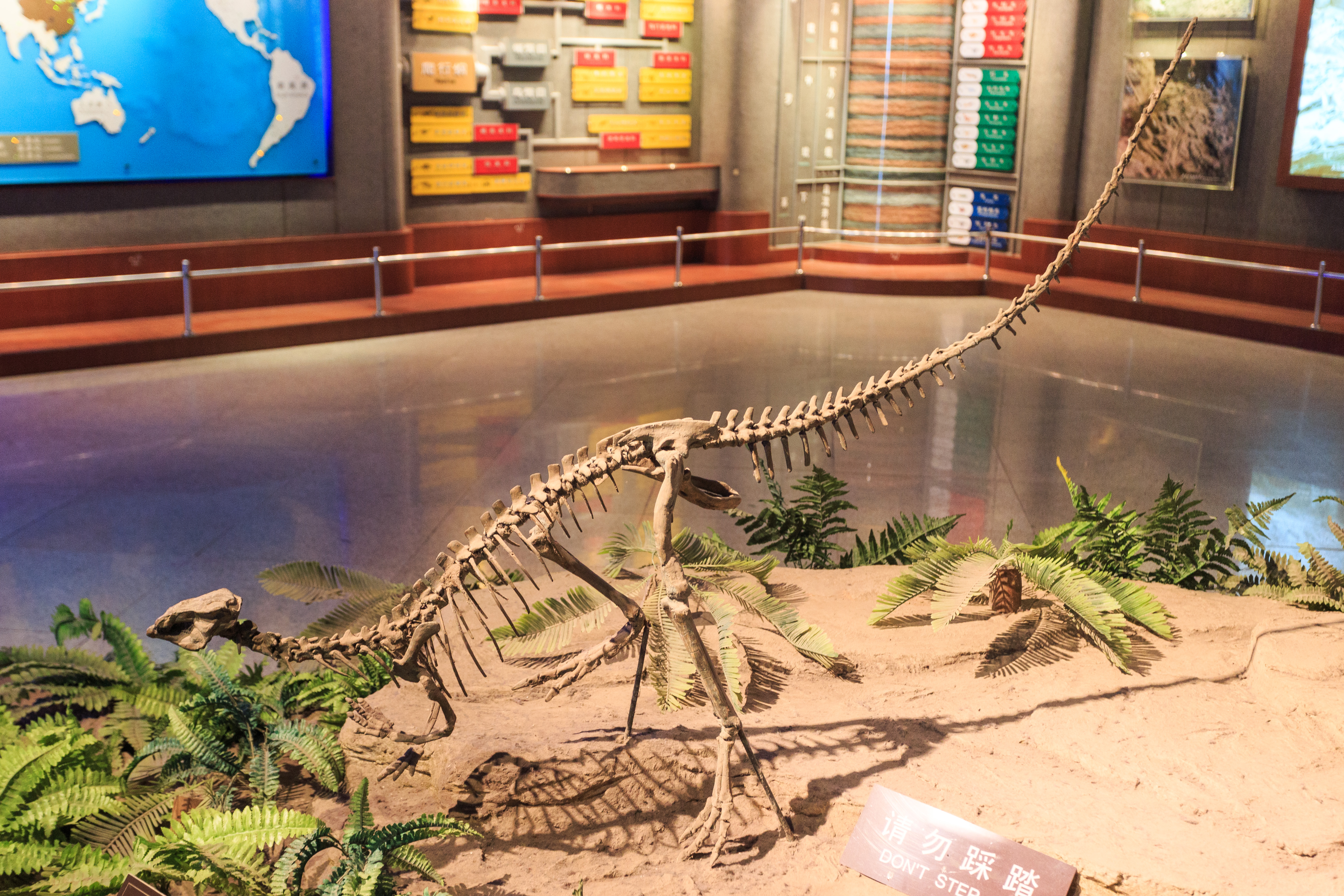
- Mounted skeleton at the Zigong Dinosaur Museum

Scientific classification
- Kingdom: Animalia
- Phylum: Chordata
- Class: Reptilia
- Clade: Dinosauria
- Clade: †Ornithischia
- Clade: †Neornithischia
- Genus: †Agilisaurus; Peng, 1990
- Species: †A. louderbacki

Binomial name
- †Agilisaurus louderbacki Peng, 1990

= Agilisaurus =

Agilisaurus Temporal range: Middle Jurassic, 168–164 Ma

Extinct genus of dinosaurs

Agilisaurus (/ˌædʒɪlɪˈsɔːrəs/; 'agile lizard') is a genus of ornithischian dinosaur from the Middle Jurassic Period of what is now eastern Asia. The only named species is A. louderbacki, recovered from the Lower Shaximiao Formation of Sichuan, China. It was about 1.2–1.7 m (3.9–5.6 ft) in length, 60 cm (2.0 ft) in hip height, and 40 kg (88 lb) in weight. It has leaf-shaped teeth that were well-adapted to its abrasive, plant-based diet. Most surprisingly, the wavy enamel of the teeth of this genus (and all other ornithopods), presumed to make them more resistant to wear, was previously thought to be exclusive to hadrosaurs. This is also the case for Changchunsaurus from the Cretaceous Period.

== Discovery and history ==
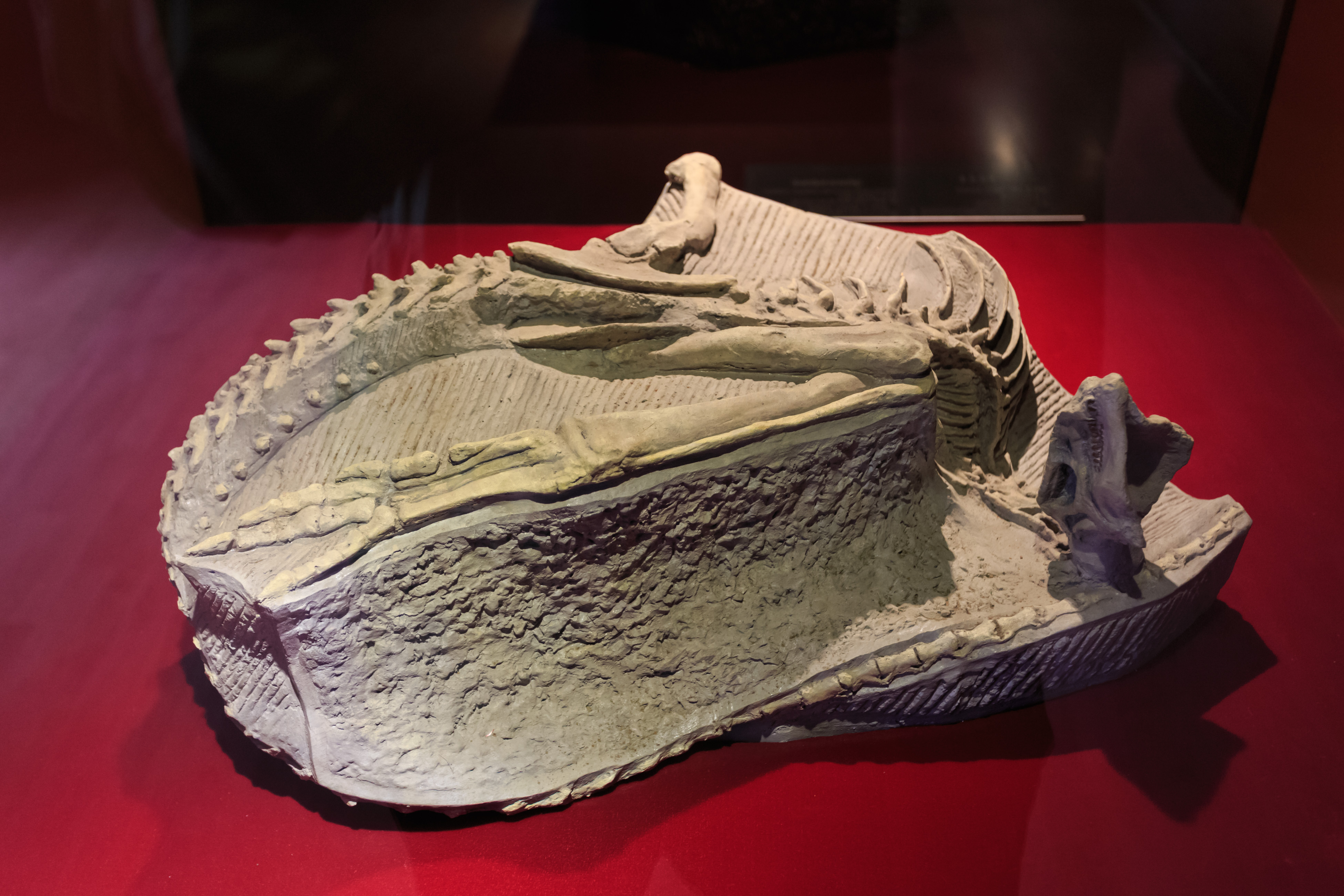
Holotype specimen in Zigong Dinosaur Museum

There is one named species (A. louderbacki), named after Dr. George Louderback, an American geologist and the first to recognize dinosaur fossils from the Sichuan Province of China in 1915. The holotype, which is the only known specimen, was discovered in 1984, during the construction of the Zigong Dinosaur Museum. Both genus and type species were named by Chinese paleontologist Peng Guangzhou in very brief fashion in 1990, then described in further detail by Peng in 1992.

The name is derived from the Latin "agilis" meaning 'agile' and the Greek "sauros" meaning 'lizard', and refers to the agility suggested by its lightweight skeleton and long legs. The species epithet, louderbacki, honors the late U.S. geologist Dr. George D. Louderback the first to discover fossils within the Sichuan Basin in 1915.

A single complete skeleton of A. louderbacki is known to science, one of the most complete small ornithischian skeletons ever found. Only a few parts of its left fore limb and hind limb are missing, and those can be reconstructed from their counterparts on the right side.

This skeleton was actually discovered during the construction of the Zigong Dinosaur Museum, in which it is now housed. This museum features many dinosaurs recovered from the famous Dashanpu Quarry outside the city of Zigong, in the Chinese province of Sichuan, including Agilisaurus, as well as Xuanhanosaurus, Shunosaurus, and Huayangosaurus. This quarry preserves sediment from the Lower Shaximiao Formation (sometimes called "Xiashaximiao") which ranges from the Bathonian through Callovian stages of the Middle Jurassic Period, or from about 168 to 161 million years ago.

== Description ==
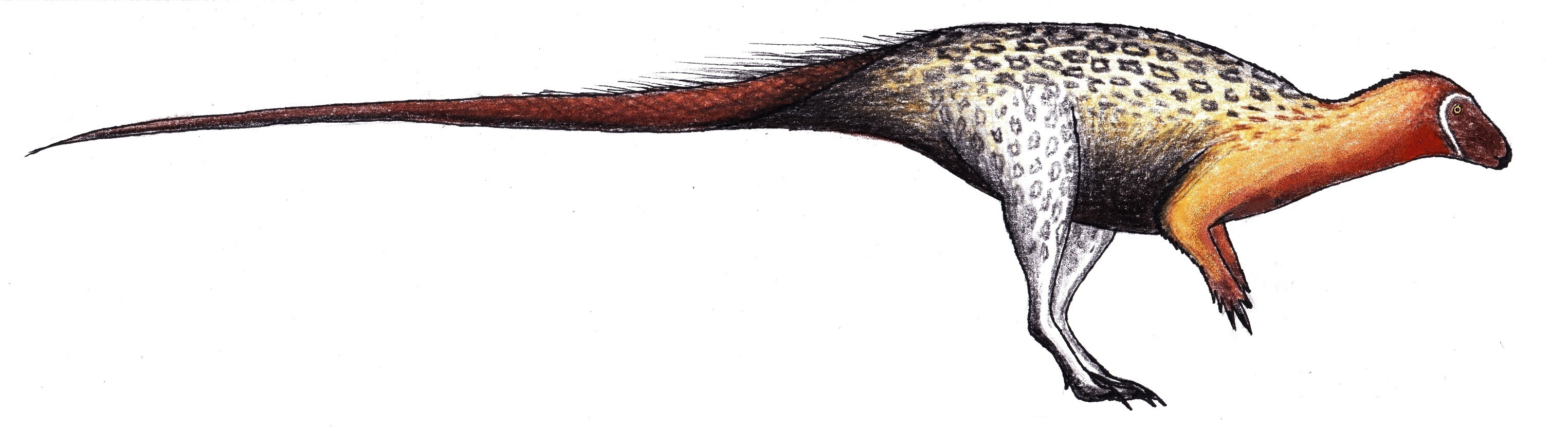
Life restoration

Its tibia (lower leg bone), at 20.7 cm (8.1 in) in length, was slightly longer than its femur (upper leg bone), at 19.9 cm (7.8 in) in length, which indicates that it was an extremely fast bipedal runner, using its long tail for balance, although it may have walked on all fours when browsing for food. It was a small herbivore, and like all ornithischians, it had a beak-like structure on the ends of both upper and lower jaws to help it crop plant material. Because it lacks tail-stiffening interwoven bony struts, some paleontologists think it may have been a burrow dweller.

== Classification ==
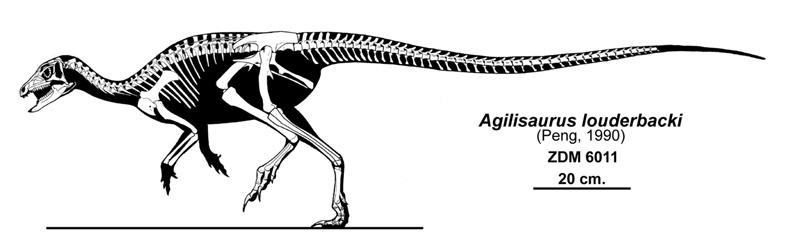
Skeletal reconstruction

Despite its completeness, Agilisaurus has been placed in many different positions in the ornithischian family tree. It was originally placed in the family Fabrosauridae, which is no longer considered valid by most paleontologists.

Several recent studies, including cladistic analyses, find Agilisaurus to be the most basal member of the group Euornithopoda, which includes all ornithopods more derived than the family Heterodontosauridae.

However, heterodontosaurs are not universally considered to be ornithopods and have been considered more closely related to the suborder Marginocephalia, which includes ceratopsians and pachycephalosaurs. In one recent cladistic analysis, Agilisaurus was found in a position basal to heterodontosaurs in the branch leading to Marginocephalia.

Agilisaurus has been recovered in other positions as well, including as an ornithischian basal to both ornithopods and marginocephalians.

Size compared to a human

In his more thorough 1992 description, Peng added a new species to the genus Agilisaurus. This species had previously been known as Yandusaurus multidens. Because this species did not belong in the genus Yandusaurus and due to similarities with A. louderbacki, it was assigned the name Agilisaurus multidens.

Other scientists were not convinced that this species belonged to either Yandusaurus or Agilisaurus, and in 2005, it was once again reassigned, this time to its own newly created genus. It is now known as Hexinlusaurus multidens. Several studies agree that this species is slightly more derived than Agilisaurus.

== Paleobiology ==
Comparisons between the scleral rings of Agilisaurus and modern birds and reptiles suggest that it may have been diurnal, unlike larger herbivorous dinosaurs that were inferred to be cathemeral, being active throughout the day at short intervals.
