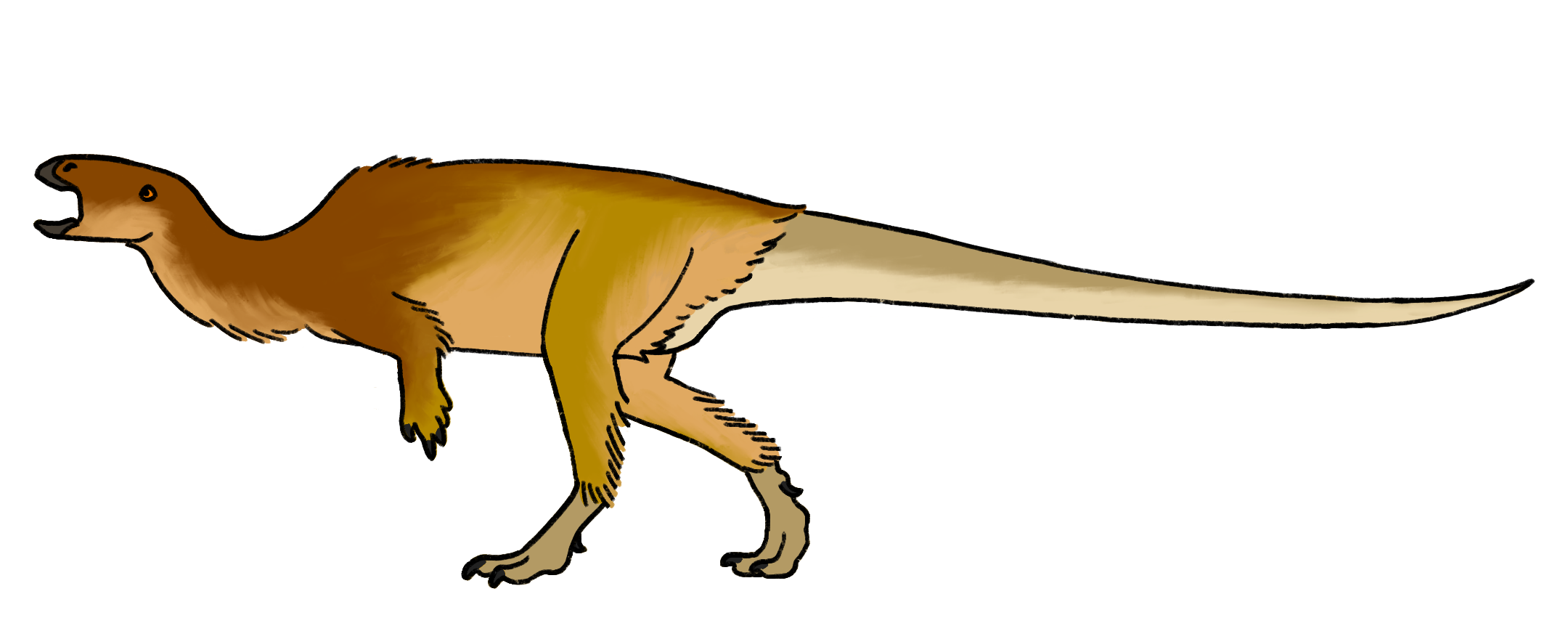
- Life reconstruction of Yandusaurus

Scientific classification
- Kingdom: Animalia
- Phylum: Chordata
- Class: Reptilia
- Clade: Dinosauria
- Clade: †Ornithischia
- Genus: †Yandusaurus; He, 1979
- Species: †Y. hongheensis

Binomial name
- †Yandusaurus hongheensis He, 1979

= Yandusaurus =

Yandusaurus Temporal range: Middle Jurassic, Bathonian

Extinct genus of dinosaurs

Yandusaurus is a genus of basal neornithischian dinosaur from the middle Jurassic (Bathonian age, approximately 168 to 162 Ma) of eastern Asia. The type species is Y. hongheensis, described in 1979 from the Lower Shaximiao Formation of Sichuan Province, China.

== Discovery and naming ==
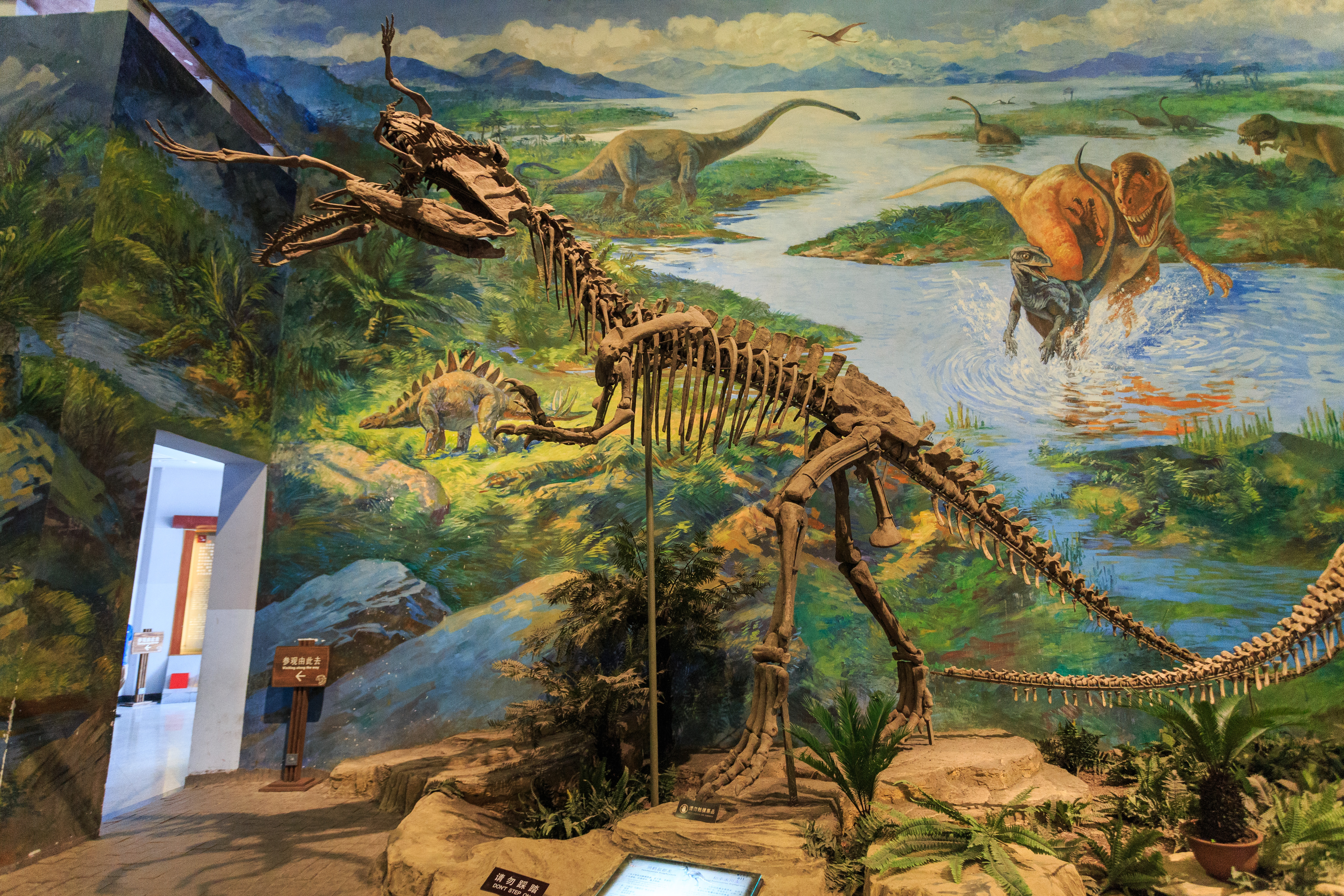
Cast of a Sinraptor mounted as if eating a Yandusaurus, Zigong Dinosaur Museum

In January 1973 the Museum of the Salt Industry at Zigong in Sichuan was warned that during construction activities with a composter at Jinzidang near the Honghe dam inadvertently a dinosaur skeleton had been processed. A team of the museum managed to salvage some heavily damaged remains. Though locally this animal was at first referred to as "Yubasaurus" or "Honghesaurus", in 1979 Beijing professor He Xinlu named and described it as the type species Yandusaurus hongheensis. The generic name is derived from Yandu, the ancient name for Zigong. This name is a contraction of yan, "salt", and du, "capital", occasioned by the fact that Zigong was historically the centre of Chinese salt mining. In this way Yandusaurus indirectly also refers to the Salt Museum. The specific name refers to the Honghe river.

The holotype specimen, GCC V20501, had been dug up in a layer of the Lower Shaximiao Formation. It consists of a partial skeleton with skull. Elements of most parts of the body have been preserved, the skull, vertebral column, shoulder girdle, frontlimbs and hindlimbs but all are very limited and/or damaged. The lower jaws, pelvis and the end of the tail had probably been entirely destroyed by the machine.

In 1983 He and Cai Kaiji identified a second species: Yandusaurus multidens, known from two nearly complete skeletons and nine partial skeletons. In 1992 this was by Guangzhao Peng reassigned to the genus Agilisaurus as a A. multidens. In 1996 Gregory S. Paul renamed it as Othnielia multidens. In 2005 it was by Paul Barrett e.a. placed in its own genus, Hexinlusaurus.

== Description ==
A fast-moving biped, Yandusaurus had four toes on each foot and five fingers on each hand. It had large eyes as shown by the curved jugal. The teeth, showing a unique pattern of parallel vertical ridges compared by Chinese researchers to the fingers of the hand of Buddha statues, are very asymmetrical in that the inner side is strongly worn down. The fifteen maxillary teeth are largest in the middle and overlap.

When indicating the size of Yandusaurus many sources give that of Hexinlusaurus, the previous Y. multidens, the (all juvenile) specimens of which are sixty centimetres (two feet) to 1.6 metres (5 ft) in length, and weighed around 7 kg (fifteen lb). Yandusaurus hongheensis was however considerably larger than these exemplars: He estimated the body length at three metres, Peng at 3.2 metres; in 2010 G.S. Paul gave an estimation of 3.8 metres length and a weight of 140 kg.

== Phylogeny ==
Yandusaurus was assigned by He to the Hypsilophodontidae. Today however Hypsilophodontidae is considered an unnatural (paraphyletic) group and Yandusaurus is viewed as taking an unresolved position within Neornithischia.
