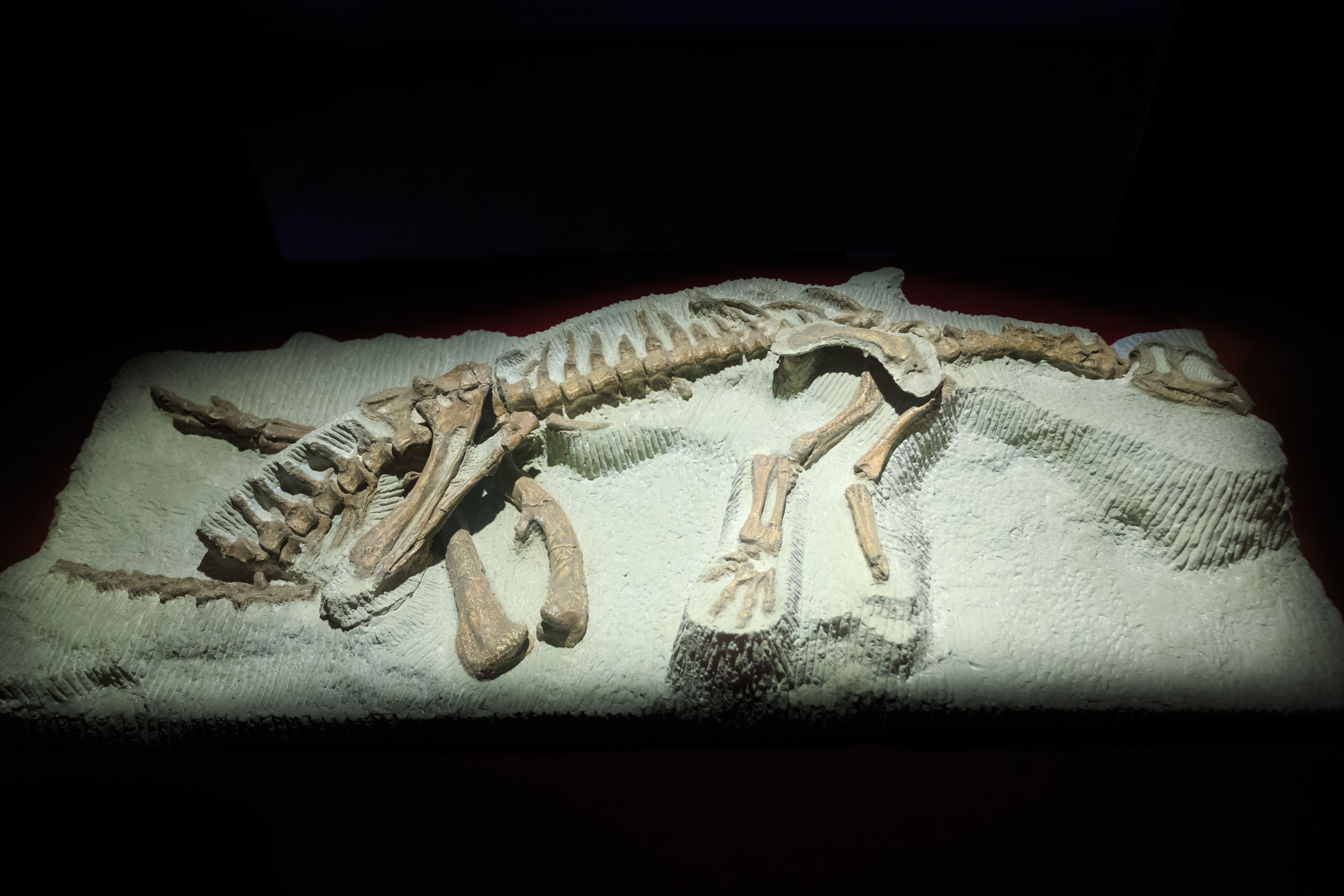
- Specimen in Zigong Dinosaur Museum

Scientific classification
- Kingdom: Animalia
- Phylum: Chordata
- Class: Reptilia
- Clade: Dinosauria
- Clade: †Ornithischia
- Clade: †Genasauria
- Clade: †Neornithischia
- Genus: †Hexinlusaurus; Barrett et al., 2005
- Species: †H. multidens

Binomial name
- †Hexinlusaurus multidens Barrett et al., 2005

Synonyms
- Xiaosaurus multidens Guangzhao, 1992; Yandusaurus multidens He & Cai, 1983

= Hexinlusaurus =

Hexinlusaurus Temporal range: Middle Jurassic, Bajocian

Extinct genus of dinosaurs

Hexinlusaurus is a genus of basal ornithischian dinosaur from the Middle Jurassic (Bajocian stage) Lower Shaximiao Formation of what is now China. The type and only species is Hexinlusaurus multidens.

== Discovery ==
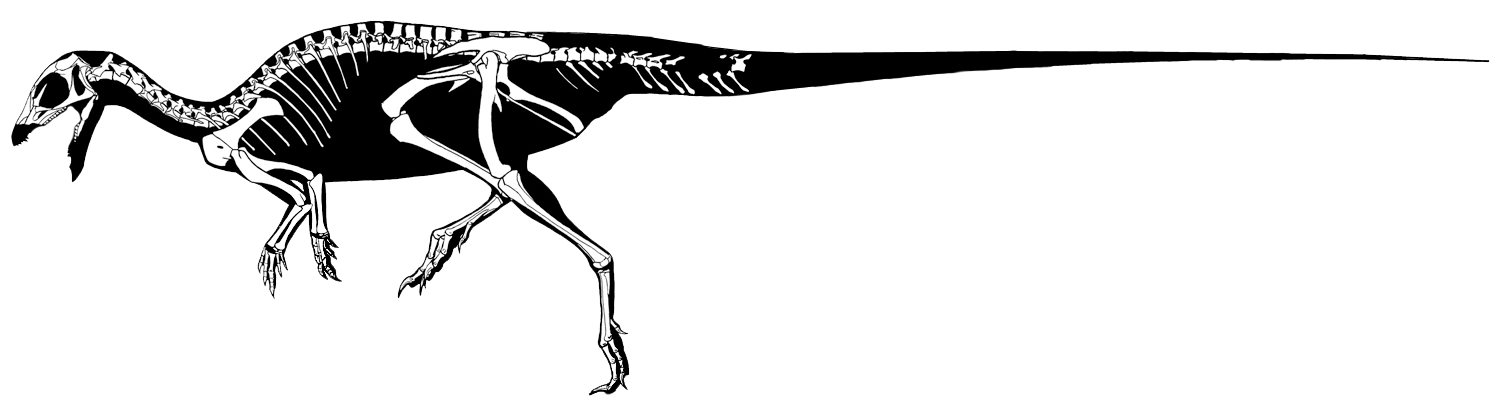
Skeletal restoration

The holotype (ZDM T6001, Zigong Dinosaur Museum, Dashanpu, People's Republic of China), consists of an almost complete, articulated skull and some postcranial material, collected from a terrestrial sandstone within the Lower Shaximiao Formation (?Bajocian) at the famous dinosaur-bearing quarries at Dashanpu. A paratype (ZDM T6002) consists of a partial skull and postcranial remains. Previously, it had been described as a species of Yandusaurus, Y. multidens (He and Cai, 1983), but was reclassified as a new taxon by Paul M. Barrett, Richard J. Butler and Fabien Knoll in 2005, who diagnosed this anatomically conservative species as follows: "A small ornithischian dinosaur distinguished from all other basal ornithischians by a single autapomorphy, the presence of a marked concavity that extends over the lateral surface of the postorbital." The etymology of the genus name honors Professor He Xin-Lu (from the Chengdu University of Technology) who originally named the specimen as Y. multidens + the Greek sauros (=lizard). Hexinlusaurus was a small, fleet-footed herbivore.

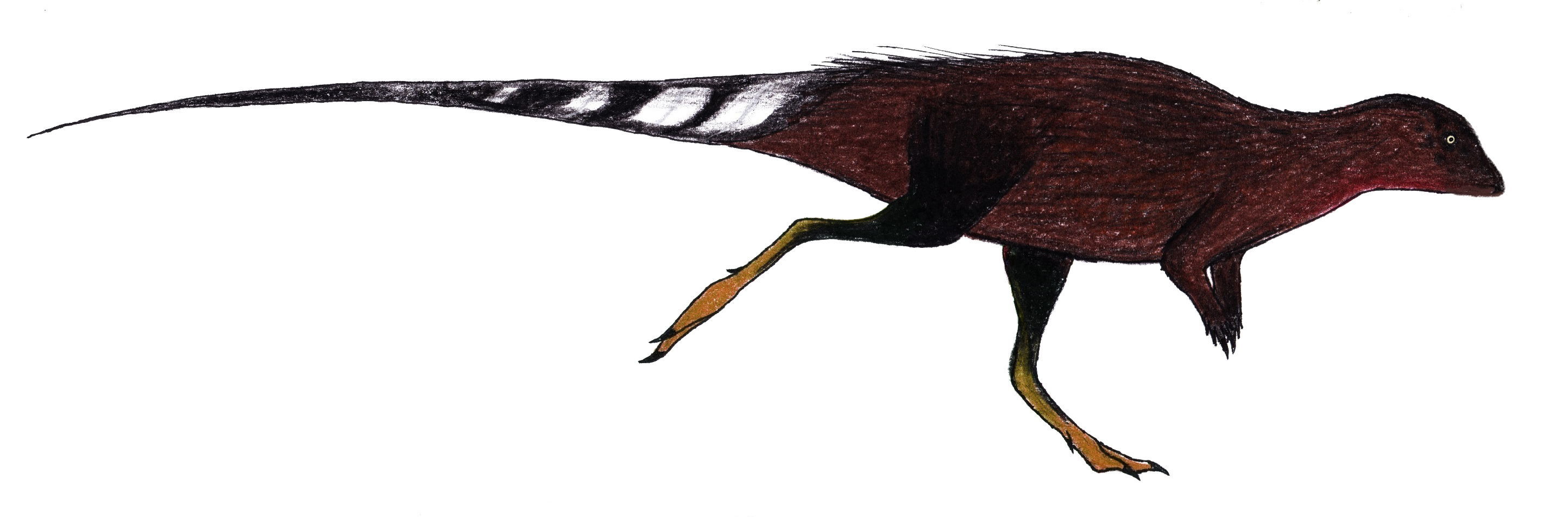
Life restoration

Before being officially named Hexinlusaurus, this genus was briefly known under the informal name "Proyandusaurus". This name originally appeared in an abstract attributed to Fabien Knoll, which was apparently published in 1999 without his consent.

Other dinosaurs known from Dashanpu include the sauropod Shunosaurus, the theropod Gasosaurus, and the stegosaur Huayangosaurus.

== Sources ==
- Barrett, P.M.; Butler, R. J.; Knoll, F. (2005). "Small-bodied ornithischian dinosaurs from the Middle Jurassic of Sichuan, China". Journal of Vertebrate Paleontology. 25 (4): 823–834. doi:10.1671/0272-4634(2005)025[0823:sodftm]2.0.co;2.
- Butler, Richard J.; Upchurch, Paul; Norman, David B. (2008). "The phylogeny of the ornithischian dinosaurs". Journal of Systematic Palaeontology. 6 (1): 1–40. Bibcode:2008JSPal...6....1B. doi:10.1017/S1477201907002271. S2CID 86728076.
- Knoll, F. 1999. The family Fabrosauridae. In: J. I. Canudo and G. Cuenca-Bescós (Eds.): IV European Workshop on Vertebrate Palaeontology, Albarracin (Teruel, Spain), junio de 1999. Programme and Abstracts, Field guide. Servicio Publicaciones Universidad de Zaragoza, 54.
- He, X.-L.; Cai, K.-J. (1983). "A new species of Yandusaurus (hypsilophodont dinosaur) from the Middle Jurassic of Dashanpu, Zigong, Sichuan". Journal of Chengdu College of Geology (Supplement 1): 5–14.
