= List of Mesozoic bird-line archosaur genera (G–K) =

This list of Mesozoic bird-line archosaur genera is a comprehensive listing of all Mesozoic genera that are included in the clade Avemetatarsalia (alternatively known as Pan-Aves), including dinosaurs, pterosaurs, silesaurids, lagerpetids, and more basal genera. The list includes all commonly accepted genera whose names begin with the letters G–K. The list currently includes 283 genera.

== Scope and terminology ==
There is no official, canonical list of Mesozoic bird-line archosaur genera, but thorough attempts have been made for its various subgroups, such as George Olshevsky's Dinosaur Genera List, the book The Dinosauria, Mikko Haaramo's Phylogeny Archive, Mike Hanson's The Pterosauria, the Pterosaur Species List, Donald F. Glut's Dinosaurs: The Encyclopedia series, Holtz's list of Mesozoic dinosaurs, Molina-Perez & Larramendi's list of theropods, and Mickey Mortimer's Theropod Database. These lists have been supplemented with more recent publications to create this one.

- Genus: The generic name of the taxon, sourced to its description publication.
- Authors: Full names of the authors of the descriptions. This column can be sorted by last names.
- Year: The year when the descriptions were physically published. These are not necessarily the years the names became valid according to the rules of the International Commission on Zoological Nomenclature (ICZN).
- Formation: The geological formations each taxon was found in, along with their epoch and age. In the case of multiple formations, holotype localities are marked by an asterisk.
- Location: Every country and first-level subdivision the taxon was found in. In the case of multiple locations, holotype localities are marked by an asterisk.

== The list ==
Genus	Authors	Year	Formation	Location	Notes	Images
Galeamopus	Emanuel Tschopp; Octávio Mateus; Roger B.J. Benson	2015	Morrison Formation (Late Jurassic, Kimmeridgian)	United States (Colorado; Wyoming*)	One specimen is nearly complete, even preserving an associated skull	
Galleonosaurus	Matthew C. Herne; Jay P. Nair; Alistair R. Evans; Alan M. Tait	2019	Strzelecki Group (Early Cretaceous, Barremian)	Australia (Victoria)	Its upper jaw bone resembles a galleon when turned upside down	
Gallimimus	Halszka Osmólska; Ewa Roniewicz; Rinchen Barsbold	1972	Nemegt Formation (Late Cretaceous, Maastrichtian)	Mongolia (Ömnögovi)	Had a relatively long beak with a rounded tip	
Gallornis	Kálmán Lambrecht	1931	Unnamed French formation (Early Cretaceous, Berriasian to Hauterivian)	France (Bourgogne-Franche-Comté)	May be the oldest known crown bird, but this is unconfirmed	
Galvesaurus	José L. Barco; José I. Canudo; Gloria Cuenca-Bescós; José I. Ruiz-Omeñaca	2005	Villar del Arzobispo Formation (Late Jurassic to Early Cretaceous, Tithonian to Berriasian)	Spain (Aragon)	Two sets of paleontologists named the same fossil seemingly unaware of each other's work, although there is evidence that one of them seemingly plagiarized the others, but misspelled the name as Galveosaurus	
Gamatavus	Flávio A. Pretto; Rodrigo T. Müller; Debora Moro; Maurício S. Garcia; Voltaire D. Paes Neto; Átila A. Stock Da Rosa	2022	Pinheiros-Chiniquá Sequence (Late Triassic, Carnian)	Brazil (Rio Grande do Sul)	One of the oldest known South American silesaurs	
Gandititan	Fenglu Han; Ling Yang; Fasheng Lou; Corwin Sullivan; Xing Xu; Wenjiang Qiu; Hanfeng Liu; Juan Yu; Rui Wu; Yuzheng Ke; Mengyuan Xu; Jinfeng Hu; Pikun Lu	2024	Zhoutian Formation (Late Cretaceous, Turonian to Coniacian)	China (Jiangxi)	Possibly a close relative of Abdarainurus	
Gannansaurus	Junchang Lü; Laiping Yi; Hui Zhong; Xuefang Wei	2013	Nanxiong Formation (Late Cretaceous, Maastrichtian)	China (Jiangxi)	Its vertebrae were more similar to those of Euhelopus than to other sauropods	
Gansus	Lianhai Hou; Zhicheng Liu	1984	Xiagou Formation (Early Cretaceous, Aptian)	China (Gansu)	Capable of both flight and diving	
Ganzhousaurus	Shuo Wang; Chengkai Sun; Corwin Sullivan; Xing Xu	2013	Nanxiong Formation (Late Cretaceous, Maastrichtian)	China (Jiangxi)	Likely primarily herbivorous, which allowed it to niche-partition with at least seven other contemporary oviraptorosaurs	
Gargantuavis	Eric Buffetaut; Jean Le Loeuff	1998	Argiles et Grès à Reptiles Formation (Late Cretaceous, Campanian); Marnes Rouges Inférieures Formation (Late Cretaceous, Maastrichtian)	France (Occitania*; Provence-Alpes-Côte d'Azur)	Large and mostly known from isolated pelvic bones	
Gargoyleosaurus	Kenneth Carpenter; Clifford A. Miles; Karen Cloward	1998	Morrison Formation (Late Jurassic, Kimmeridgian to Tithonian)	United States (Wyoming)	Combines features of both ankylosaurids and nodosaurids	
Garrigatitan	Verónica Díez Díaz; Géraldine Garcia; Xabier Pereda-Suberbiola; Benjamin Jentgen-Ceschino; Koen Stein; Pascal Godefroit; Xavier Valentin	2021	Argiles et Grès à Reptiles Formation (Late Cretaceous, Campanian)	France (Provence-Alpes-Côte d'Azur)	Known from remains of both adults and subadults	
Garudimimus	Rinchen Barsbold	1981	Bayanshiree Formation (Late Cretaceous, Cenomanian to Coniacian)	Mongolia (Ömnögovi)	Was not as well-adapted to running as later ornithomimosaurs	
Garumbatitan	Pedro Mocho; Fernando Escaso; José M. Gasulla; Àngel Galobart; Begoña Poza; Andrés Santos-Cubedo; José L. Sanz; Francisco Ortega	2024	Arcillas de Morella Formation (Early Cretaceous, Barremian)	Spain (Valencia)	Had a reduced claw on the third toe	
Gasosaurus	Zhiming Dong; Zilu Tang	1985	Xiashaximiao Formation (Middle Jurassic to Late Jurassic, Bathonian to Oxfordian)	China (Sichuan)	Discovered as a byproduct of construction work	
Gasparinisaura	Rodolfo A. Coria; Leonardo J. Salgado	1996	Anacleto Formation (Late Cretaceous, Campanian)	Argentina (Río Negro)	Known from specimens of both adults and juveniles	
Gastonia	James I. Kirkland	1998	Cedar Mountain Formation (Early Cretaceous, Berriasian to Aptian)	United States (Utah)	Several concentrations of fossils may suggest this taxon lived in herds	
Gegepterus	Xiaolin Wang; Alexander W. A. Kellner; Zhonghe Zhou; Diogenes A. Campos	2007	Yixian Formation (Early Cretaceous, Barremian)	China (Liaoning)	Preserves a coating of hair-like structures	
Geminiraptor	Phil Senter; James I. Kirkland; John Bird; Jeff A. Bartlett	2010	Cedar Mountain Formation (Early Cretaceous, Berriasian to Valanginian)	United States (Utah)	The proportions of its maxilla are similar to those of Late Cretaceous troodontids	
Genusaurus	Hugues Accarie; Bernard Beaudoin; Jean Dejax; Gérard Friès; Jean-Guy Michard; Philippe Taquet	1995	Bevons Beds (Early Cretaceous, Albian)	France (Provence-Alpes-Côte d'Azur)	Has been suggested to be either a noasaurid or an abelisaurid	
Genyodectes	Arthur S. Woodward	1901	Cerro Barcino Formation (Early Cretaceous to Late Cretaceous, Aptian to Cenomanian)	Argentina (Chubut)	Had extremely large and protruding teeth	
Geranosaurus	Robert Broom	1911	Clarens Formation (Early Jurassic, Pliensbachian to Toarcian)	South Africa (Eastern Cape)	Poorly known but potentially a heterodontosaurid	
Germanodactylus	Zhongjian Yang	1964	Altmühltal Formation (Late Jurassic, Tithonian)	Germany (Bavaria)	Had a distinctive rounded crest	
Gettyia	Jessie Atterholt; J. Howard Hutchison; Jingmai K. O'Connor	2018	Two Medicine Formation (Late Cretaceous, Campanian)	United States (Montana)	A new genus for Avisaurus gloriae	
Gideonmantellia	José I. Ruiz-Omeñaca; José I. Canudo; Gloria Cuenca-Bescós; Penélope Cruzado-Caballero; José M. Gasca; Miguel Moreno-Azanza	2012	Camarillas Formation (Early Cretaceous, Barremian)	Spain (Aragon)	Originally misidentified as a specimen of Hypsilophodon	
Giganotosaurus	Rodolfo A. Coria; Leonardo J. Salgado	1995	Candeleros Formation (Late Cretaceous, Cenomanian)	Argentina (Neuquén)	One of the largest known terrestrial carnivorous dinosaurs	
Gigantoraptor	Xing Xu; Qingwei Tan; Jianmin Wang; Xijin Zhao; Lin Tan	2007	Iren Dabasu Formation (Late Cretaceous, Turonian to Maastrichtian)	China (Inner Mongolia)	The largest known oviraptorosaur, comparable in size to Albertosaurus	
Gigantosaurus	Harry G. Seeley	1869	Kimmeridge Clay (Late Jurassic, Kimmeridgian)	England (Cambridgeshire; Dorset*)	May have possessed osteoderms	
Gigantoscelus	Egbert C. N. van Hoepen	1916	Bushveld Sandstone (Early Jurassic, Hettangian to Sinemurian)	South Africa (Limpopo)	Probably a synonym of Euskelosaurus, but this cannot be confirmed	
Gigantspinosaurus	Hui Ouyang	1992	Shangshaximiao Formation (Late Jurassic, Oxfordian to Tithonian)	China (Sichuan)	Possessed broad, greatly enlarged shoulder spines	
Gilmoreosaurus	Michael K. Brett-Surman	1979	Iren Dabasu Formation (Late Cretaceous, Turonian to Maastrichtian)	China (Inner Mongolia)	Several fossils preserve evidence of cancer-induced tumors	
Giraffatitan	Gregory S. Paul	1988	Tendaguru Formation (Late Jurassic, Oxfordian to Tithonian)	Tanzania (Lindi)	Popularly associated with Brachiosaurus but several differences between the two have been noted	
Glacialisaurus	Nathan D. Smith; Diego Pol	2007	Hanson Formation (Early Jurassic, Pliensbachian)	Antarctica (Ross Dependency)	Basal yet survived late enough to coexist with true sauropods	
Gladocephaloideus	Junchang Lü; Qiang Ji; Xuefang Wei; Yongqing Liu	2012	Yixian Formation (Early Cretaceous, Barremian)	China (Liaoning)	Originally believed to be a relative of Cycnorhamphus	
Glishades	Albert Prieto-Márquez	2010	Two Medicine Formation (Late Cretaceous, Campanian)	United States (Montana)	Described as a basal hadrosauroid but may in fact be a juvenile saurolophine hadrosaurid	
Glyptodontopelta	Tracy L. Ford	2000	Ojo Alamo Formation (Late Cretaceous, Maastrichtian)	United States (New Mexico)	Originally interpreted as possessing a flat mosaic of osteoderms similar to the shields of glyptodonts	
Gnathosaurus	Hermann von Meyer	1834	Altmühltal Formation (Late Jurassic, Tithonian)*; Purbeck Marble (Late Jurassic to Early Cretaceous, Tithonian to Berriasian)	England (Dorset); Germany (Bavaria*)	Once believed to be an unusual crocodilian	
Gnathovorax	Cristian Pacheco; Rodrigo T. Müller; Max C. Langer; Flávio A. Pretto; Leonardo Kerber; Sérgio Dias-da-Silva	2019	Candelária Sequence (Late Triassic, Carnian)	Brazil (Rio Grande do Sul)	Known from a well-preserved, almost complete skeleton	
Gobihadros	Khishigjav Tsogtbaatar; David B. Weishampel; David C. Evans; Mahito Watabe	2019	Bayanshiree Formation (Late Cretaceous, Cenomanian to Coniacian)	Mongolia (Dornogovi; Ömnögovi*)	Multiple specimens are known, representing different growth stages	
Gobipipus	Evgeny N. Kurochkin; Sankar Chatterjee; K. E. Mikhailov	2013	Baruungoyot Formation (Late Cretaceous, Maastrichtian)	Mongolia (Ömnögovi)	Very similar to embryonic Gobipteryx specimens, although its describers consider it distinct	
Gobipteryx	Andrzej Elżanowski	1974	Baruungoyot Formation (Late Cretaceous, Maastrichtian)	Mongolia (Ömnögovi)	Possessed a robust beak which convergently evolved with those of modern birds	
Gobiraptor	Sungjin Lee; Yuong-Nam Lee; Anusuya Chinsamy; Junchang Lü; Rinchen Barsbold; Khishigjav Tsogtbaatar	2019	Nemegt Formation (Late Cretaceous, Maastrichtian)	Mongolia (Ömnögovi)	Had a deep jaw that may be an adaptation to crushing bivalves or seeds	
Gobisaurus	Matthew K. Vickaryous; Anthony P. Russell; Philip J. Currie; Xijin Zhao	2001	Miaogou Formation (Early Cretaceous, Aptian to Albian)	China (Inner Mongolia)	Had no tail club but already possessed the stiff tail of derived ankylosaurids	
Gobititan	Hailu You; Feng Tang; Zhexi Luo	2003	Xiagou Formation (Early Cretaceous, Aptian)	China (Gansu)	Retained the fifth digit of the foot, a basal trait	
Gobivenator	Takanobu Tsuihiji; Rinchen Barsbold; Mahito Watabe; Khishigjav Tsogtbaatar; Tsogtbaatar Chinzorig; Yoshito Fujiyama; Shigeru Suzuki	2014	Djadokhta Formation (Late Cretaceous, Campanian)	Mongolia (Ömnögovi)	The most completely known Cretaceous troodontid	
Gojirasaurus	Kenneth Carpenter	1997	Bull Canyon Formation (Late Triassic, Norian)	United States (New Mexico)	May be a chimera consisting of undiagnostic theropod bones mixed with pseudosuchian vertebrae	
Gondwanatitan	Alexander W. A. Kellner; Sergio A. K. de Azevedo	1999	Adamantina Formation (Late Cretaceous, Coniacian to Maastrichtian)	Brazil (São Paulo)	For a titanosaur, it had relatively gracile limb bones	
Gondwanax	Rodrigo T. Müller	2025	Pinheiros-Chiniquá Sequence (Late Triassic, Carnian)	Brazil (Rio Grande do Sul)	The oldest dinosauromorph with three sacral vertebrae	
Gongbusaurus	Zhiming Dong; Shiwu Zhou; Yihong Zhang	1983	Shangshaximiao Formation (Late Jurassic, Oxfordian to Tithonian)	China (Sichuan)	Only known from a pair of teeth that may come from an ankylosaurian	
Gongpoquansaurus	Hailu You; Daqing Li; Peter Dodson	2014	Zhonggou Formation (Early Cretaceous, Aptian)	China (Gansu)	Remains originally named as a species of Probactrosaurus	
Gongxianosaurus	Xinlu He; Changsheng Wang; Shangzhong Liu; Fengyun Zhou; Tuqiang Liu; Kaiji Cai; Bing Dai	1998	Ziliujing Formation (Early Jurassic, Sinemurian to Toarcian)	China (Sichuan)	The only sauropod with ossified distal tarsals, hinting at its basal position	
Gonkoken	Jhonatan Alarcón-Muñoz; Alexander O. Vargas; Hans P. Püschel; Sergio Soto-Acuña; Leslie Manríquez; Marcelo Leppe; Jonatan Kaluza; Verónica Milla; Carolina Simon-Gutstein; José Palma-Liberona; Wolfgang Stinnesbeck; Eberhard Frey; Juan Pablo Pino; Dániel Bajor; Elaine Núñez; Héctor Ortiz; David Rubilar-Rogers; Penélope Cruzado-Caballero	2023	Dorotea Formation (Late Cretaceous, Maastrichtian)	Chile (Magallanes)	The southernmost basal hadrosauroid known to date, known from more southern latitudes than true hadrosaurids	
Gorgosaurus	Lawrence M. Lambe	1914	Dinosaur Park Formation (Late Cretaceous, Campanian)*; Judith River Formation (Late Cretaceous, Campanian)	Canada (Alberta*); United States (Montana)	Dozens of specimens are known	
Goyocephale	Altangerel Perle; Teresa Maryańska; Halszka Osmólska	1982	Djadokhta Formation (Late Cretaceous, Campanian)	Mongolia (Ömnögovi)	Had a sloping head with a flat skull roof	
Grabauornis	Johan Dalsätt; Per G. P. Ericson; Zhonghe Zhou	2014	Yixian Formation (Early Cretaceous, Barremian)	China (Liaoning)	The proportions of the wings of this enantiornithean as well as the presence of an alula suggest that it was a good flier	
Graciliceratops	Paul C. Sereno	2000	Bayanshiree Formation (Late Cretaceous, Cenomanian to Coniacian)	Mongolia (Dornogovi)	Possessed a short frill with large fenestrae	
Gracilornis	Li Li; Shilin Hou	2011	Jiufotang Formation (Early Cretaceous, Aptian)	China (Liaoning)	A possible relative of Cathayornis with characteristically slender bones	
Graciliraptor	Xing Xu; Xiaolin Wang	2004	Yixian Formation (Early Cretaceous, Barremian)	China (Liaoning)	A close relative of Microraptor with slender bones	
Graculavus	Othniel Charles Marsh	1872	Hornerstown Formation (Late Cretaceous to Paleocene, Maastrichtian to Danian)*; Lance Formation (Late Cretaceous, Maastrichtian)	United States (New Jersey*; Wyoming)	May be an early charadriiform	
Gravitholus	William P. Wall; Peter M. Galton	1979	Dinosaur Park Formation (Late Cretaceous, Campanian)	Canada (Alberta)	Potentially synonymous with Stegoceras	
Gremlin	Michael J. Ryan; L. Micucci; Hanika Rizo; Corwin Sullivan; Yuong-Nam Lee; David C. Evans	2023	Oldman Formation (Late Cretaceous, Campanian)	Canada (Alberta)	Possessed a ridge running along the top of the skull	
Gresslyosaurus	Ludwig Rütimeyer	1856	Trossingen Formation (Late Triassic, Norian to Rhaetian)	Germany (Baden-Württemberg; Saxony-Anhalt); Switzerland (Aargau; Basel-Landschaft*; Schaffhausen)	Often thought to be synonymous with Plateosaurus, although several differences between them have been noted	
Gretcheniao	Luis M. Chiappe; Qingjin Meng; Francisco Serrano; Trond Sigurdsen; Min Wang; Alyssa K. Bell; Di Liu	2019	Yixian Formation (Early Cretaceous, Barremian)	China (Liaoning)	Adapted for flapping, rather than soaring, flight	
Gryphoceratops	Michael J. Ryan; David C. Evans; Philip J. Currie; Caleb M. Brown; Don Brinkman	2012	Milk River Formation (Late Cretaceous, Santonian)	Canada (Alberta)	Potentially the smallest adult ceratopsian known from North America	
Gryponyx	Robert Broom	1911	Upper Elliot Formation (Early Jurassic, Sinemurian to Pliensbachian)	South Africa (Free State)	Although usually seen as a synonym of Massospondylus, at least one study has found it to be distantly related	
Gryposaurus	Lawrence M. Lambe	1914	Dinosaur Park Formation (Late Cretaceous, Campanian)*; Javelina Formation (Late Cretaceous, Maastrichtian); Kaiparowits Formation (Late Cretaceous, Campanian); Two Medicine Formation (Late Cretaceous, Campanian)	Canada (Alberta*); United States (Montana; Texas; Utah)	One specimen preserves impressions of a row of pyramidal scales running along its back	
Guaibasaurus	José F. Bonaparte; Jorge Ferigolo; Ana M. Ribeiro	1999	Caturrita Formation (Late Triassic, Norian)	Brazil (Rio Grande do Sul)	Combines features of both early theropods and sauropodomorphs	
Gualicho	Sebastián Apesteguía; Nathan D. Smith; Rubén D. Juárez Valieri; Peter J. Makovicky	2016	Huincul Formation (Late Cretaceous, Cenomanian to Turonian)	Argentina (Río Negro)	Originally described as having highly reduced arms with only two fingers, convergent with tyrannosaurids, although one study suggests that a third finger was present	
Guanlong	Xing Xu; James M. Clark; Catherine A. Forster; Mark A. Norell; Gregory M. Erickson; David A. Eberth; Chengkai Jia; Qi Zhao	2006	Shishugou Formation (Middle Jurassic to Late Jurassic, Callovian to Oxfordian)	China (Xinjiang)	Two specimens have been discovered, one on top of the other	
Guemesia	Federico L. Agnolín; Mauricio A. Cerroni; Agustín Scanferla; Anjali Goswami; Ariana Paulina-Carabajal; Thomas Halliday; Andrew R. Cuff; Santiago Reuil	2021	Los Blanquitos Formation (Late Cretaceous, Campanian to Maastrichtian)	Argentina (Salta)	Unlike other abelisaurids, it lacked any ornamentation on its skull	
Guidraco	Xiaolin Wang; Alexander W. A. Kellner; Shunxing Jiang; Xin Cheng	2012	Jiufotang Formation (Early Cretaceous, Aptian)	China (Liaoning)	Had large interlocking teeth that may have formed a fish trap	
Guildavis	Julia A. Clarke	2004	Niobrara Formation (Late Cretaceous, Coniacian to Campanian)	United States (Kansas)	Originally named as a specimen of Ichthyornis	
Gurilynia	Evgeny N. Kurochkin	1999	Nemegt Formation (Late Cretaceous, Maastrichtian)	Mongolia (Ömnögovi)	A poorly known genus of enantiornithean, but evidently a large and late-surviving member of the group	
Gyposaurus	Robert Broom	1911	Upper Elliot Formation (Early Jurassic, Sinemurian to Pliensbachian)	South Africa (Free State)	Two species have been named, but they may represent individuals of other genera	
Hadrosaurus	Joseph Leidy	1858	Woodbury Formation (Late Cretaceous, Campanian)	United States (New Jersey)	Its holotype was the first dinosaur skeleton to be mounted	
Haestasaurus	Paul Upchurch; Philip D. Mannion; Michael P. Taylor	2015	Hastings Beds (Early Cretaceous, Valanginian)	England (East Sussex)	Preserves impressions of differently sized hexagonal scales	
Hagryphus	Lindsay E. Zanno; Scott D. Sampson	2005	Kaiparowits Formation (Late Cretaceous, Campanian)	United States (Utah)	Large but only known from a single hand	
Halimornis	Luis M. Chiappe; James P. Lamb Jr.; Per G. P. Ericson	2002	Mooreville Chalk (Late Cretaceous, Santonian)	United States (Alabama)	Would have lived in a coastal environment	
Haliskia	Adele H. Pentland; Stephen F. Poropat; Ruairidh J. Duncan; Alexander W. A. Kellner; Renan A. M. Bantim; Joseph J. Bevitt; Alan M. Tait; Kliti Grice	2024	Toolebuc Formation (Early Cretaceous, Albian)	Australia (Queensland)	The most complete pterosaur known from Australia	
Halszkaraptor	Andrea Cau; Vincent Beyrand; Dennis F. A. E. Voeten; Vincent Fernandez; Paul Tafforeau; Koen Stein; Rinchen Barsbold; Khishigjav Tsogtbaatar; Philip J. Currie; Pascal Godefroit	2017	Djadokhta Formation (Late Cretaceous, Campanian)	Mongolia (Ömnögovi)	Originally interpreted as a semiaquatic fish hunter similar to a merganser but this hypothesis has been criticized	
Halticosaurus	Friedrich von Huene	1908	Löwenstein Formation (Late Triassic, Norian)	Germany (Baden-Württemberg)	Historically conflated with the bones of unrelated animals	
Hamipterus	Xiaolin Wang; Alexander W. A. Kellner; -Shunxing Jiang: Qiang Wang; Yingxia Ma; Yahefujiang Paidoula; Xin Cheng; Taissa Rodrigues; Xi Meng; Jialiang Zhang; Ning Li; Zhonghe Zhou	2014	Shengjinkou Formation (Early Cretaceous, Valanginian)	China (Xinjiang)	Multiple individuals, including eggs, embryoes, juveniles, and male and female adults, are known	
Hamititan	Xiaolin Wang; Kamila L. N. Bandeira; Rui Qiu; Shunxing Jiang; Xin Cheng; Yingxia Ma; Alexander W. A. Kellner	2021	Shengjinkou Formation (Early Cretaceous, Valanginian)	China (Xinjiang)	Known from seven caudal vertebrae and associated elements	
Hanssuesia	Robert M. Sullivan	2003	Dinosaur Park Formation (Late Cretaceous, Campanian)*; Judith River Formation (Late Cretaceous, Campanian); Oldman Formation (Late Cretaceous, Campanian)	Canada (Alberta*); United States (Montana)	One dome preserves several lesions	
Haopterus	Xiaolin Wang; Junchang Lü	2001	Yixian Formation (Early Cretaceous, Barremian)	China (Liaoning)	May have been a specialized piscivorous soarer	
Haplocanthosaurus	John B. Hatcher	1903	Morrison Formation (Late Jurassic, Kimmeridgian)	United States (Colorado)	One of the smallest sauropods of the Morrison Formation	
Haplocheirus	Jonah N. Choiniere; Xing Xu; James M. Clark; Catherine A. Forster; Yu Guo; Fenglu Han	2010	Shishugou Formation (Middle Jurassic to Late Jurassic, Callovian to Oxfordian)	China (Xinjiang)	Originally described as a basal alvarezsauroid but similarities have been noted with other coelurosaurs	
Harenadraco	Sungjin Lee; Yuong-Nam Lee; Jin-Young Park; Su-Hwan Kim; Zorigt Badamkhatan; Damdinsuren Idersaikhan; Khishigjav Tsogtbaatar	2023	Baruungoyot Formation (Late Cretaceous, Maastrichtian)	Mongolia (Ömnögovi)	Shows that troodontids were present in all formations of the Nemegt basin	
Harpactognathus	Kenneth Carpenter; David M. Unwin; Karen Cloward; Clifford A. Miles; Clark J. Miles	2003	Morrison Formation (Late Jurassic, Kimmeridgian)	United States (Wyoming)	Has been interpreted as a terrestrial carnivore, in contrast to other rhamphorhynchids	
Harpymimus	Rinchen Barsbold; Altangerel Perle	1984	Khuren Dukh Formation (Early Cretaceous, Aptian to Albian)	Mongolia (Dundgobi)	Mostly toothless but retains a few teeth in the dentary	
Hatzegopteryx	Eric Buffetaut; Dan Grigorescu; Zoltán Csiki	2002	Densuș-Ciula Formation (Late Cretaceous, Maastrichtian)*; Sânpetru Formation (Late Cretaceous, Maastrichtian)	Romania (Hunedoara)	An apex predator with a large, robust skull adapted for tackling large prey on the ground	
Haya	Peter J. Makovicky; Brandon M. Kilbourne; Rudyard W. Sadleir; Mark A. Norell	2011	Zos Formation (Late Cretaceous, Santonian to Campanian)	Mongolia (Dornogovi)	One specimen preserves a large mass of gastroliths	
Heishansaurus	Birger Bohlin	1953	Minhe Formation (Campanian to Maastrichtian)	China (Gansu)	May be a junior synonym of Pinacosaurus	
Helioceratops	Liyong Jin; Jun Chen; Shuqin Zan; Pascal Godefroit	2009	Quantou Formation (Early Cretaceous to Late Cretaceous, Aptian to Cenomanian)	China (Jilin)	Had a distinctively short lower jaw	
Heptasteornis	Colin J. O. Harrison; Cyril A. Walker	1975	Sânpetru Formation (Late Cretaceous, Maastrichtian)	Romania (Hunedoara)	Once believed to be a giant prehistoric owl	
Herbstosaurus	Rodolfo M. Casamiquela	1975	Vaca Muerta (Late Jurassic, Tithonian)	Argentina (Neuquén)	Originally described as a Compsognathus-like dinosaur	
Herrerasaurus	Osvaldo A. Reig	1963	Ischigualasto Formation (Late Triassic, Carnian to Norian)	Argentina (San Juan)	Usually considered a basal saurischian but may be just outside the Dinosauria	
Hesperonychus	Nicholas R. Longrich; Philip J. Currie	2009	Dinosaur Park Formation (Late Cretaceous, Campanian)	Canada (Alberta)	A common component of its habitat as indicated by the great number of its remains	
Hesperonyx	Filippo M. Rotatori; Lucrezia Ferrari; Cristina Sequero; Bruno Camilo; Octávio Mateus; Miguel Moreno-Azanza	2023	Lourinhã Formation (Late Jurassic, Kimmeridgian)	Portugal (Lisbon)	Only known from the remains of the fore- and hindlimbs	
Hesperornis	Othniel C. Marsh	1872	Claggett Shale (Late Cretaceous, Campanian); Foremost Formation (Late Cretaceous, Campanian); Judith River Formation (Late Cretaceous, Campanian); Niobrara Formation (Late Cretaceous, Coniacian to Campanian)*; Pierre Shale (Late Cretaceous, Campanian); Rybushka Formation (Late Cretaceous, Campanian); Unnamed Russian formation (Late Cretaceous, Campanian); Vermillion River Formation (Late Cretaceous, Campanian)	Canada (Alberta; Manitoba); Russia (Saratov Oblast; Volgograd Oblast); United States (Kansas*; Montana; South Dakota)	An unusual flightless loon-like aquatic bird	
Hesperornithoides	Scott Hartman; Mickey Mortimer; William R. Wahl; Dean R. Lomax; Jessica Lippincott; David M. Lovelace	2019	Morrison Formation (Late Jurassic, Kimmeridgian to Tithonian)	United States (Wyoming)	Before its formal description, it had been nicknamed "Lori"	
Hesperosaurus	Kenneth Carpenter; Clifford A. Miles; Karen Cloward	2001	Morrison Formation (Late Jurassic, Kimmeridgian)	United States (Montana; Wyoming*)	Two morphotypes of plates are known, which has been interpreted as an indication of sexual dimorphism	
Heterodontosaurus	Alfred W. Crompton; Alan J. Charig	1962	Upper Elliot Formation (Early Jurassic, Sinemurian to Pliensbachian)	South Africa (Eastern Cape)	Possessed three types of teeth, including analogues of incisors and tusks, as well as a keratinous beak	
Hexing	Liyong Jin; Jun Chen; Pascal Godefroit	2012	Yixian Formation (Early Cretaceous, Barremian)	China (Liaoning)	Three or four teeth are known, but they are not well-preserved	
Hexinlusaurus	Paul M. Barrett; Richard J. Butler; Fabien Knoll	2005	Xiashaximiao Formation (Middle Jurassic to Late Jurassic, Bathonian to Oxfordian)	China (Sichuan)	Originally named as a species of Yandusaurus	
Heyuannia	Junchang Lü	2003	Baruungoyot Formation (Late Cretaceous, Maastrichtian); Dalangshan Formation (Late Cretaceous, Maastrichtian)*	China (Guangdong*); Mongolia (Ömnögovi)	Fossilized pigments in referred eggshells suggest they were blue-green	
Hierosaurus	George R. Wieland	1909	Niobrara Formation (Late Cretaceous, Coniacian to Campanian)	United States (Kansas)	Only known from a few bones, including osteoderms	
Hippodraco	Andrew T. McDonald; James I. Kirkland; Donald D. DeBlieux; Scott K. Madsen; Jennifer Cavin; Andrew R. C. Milner; Lukas Panzarin	2010	Cedar Mountain Formation (Early Cretaceous, Berriasian to Valanginian)	United States (Utah)	Its tooth crowns were shaped like shields	
Histriasaurus	Fabio M. Dalla Vecchia	1998	Unnamed Croatian formation (Early Cretaceous, Hauterivian to Barremian)	Croatia (Istria)	Despite being discovered in Europe, it may have lived between southern Europe and Africa in life	
Holbotia	Nikita V. Zelenkov; Alexander O. Averianov	2016	Andaikhudag Formation (Early Cretaceous, Hauterivian to Barremian)	Mongolia (Bayankhongor)	Considered a small pterosaur from its discovery until its formal description	
Hollanda	Alyssa K. Bell; Luis M. Chiappe; Gregory M. Erickson; Shigeru Suzuki; Mahito Watabe; Rinchen Barsbold; Khishigjav Tsogtbaatar	2010	Baruungoyot Formation (Late Cretaceous, Maastrichtian)	Mongolia (Ömnögovi)	Had long legs which may suggest a roadrunner-like lifestyle	
Homalocephale	Teresa Maryańska; Halszka Osmólska	1974	Nemegt Formation (Late Cretaceous, Maastrichtian)	Mongolia (Ömnögovi)	Has been suggested to be a juvenile Prenocephale on account of its flat head, but this is no longer thought to be the case	
Hongshanopterus	Xiaolin Wang; Diogenes A. Campos; Zhonghe Zhou; Alexander W. A. Kellner	2008	Jiufotang Formation (Early Cretaceous, Aptian)	China (Liaoning)	May have been more closely related to istiodactylids than mimodactylids	
Hongshanornis	Zhonghe Zhou; Fucheng Zhang	2005	Yixian Formation (Early Cretaceous, Barremian)	China (Inner Mongolia)	Originally described as having a tall crest of feathers, but this may be due to taphonomic distortion of the fossil	
Hoplitosaurus	Frederick A. Lucas	1902	Lakota Formation (Early Cretaceous, Berriasian to Barremian)	United States (South Dakota)	Known from some osteoderms, including spikes similar to those of Polacanthus	
Horezmavis	Lev A. Nessov; L. J. Borkin	1983	Khodzhakul Formation (Late Cretaceous, Cenomanian)	Uzbekistan (Karakalpakstan)	Has been described as a gruiform, but this is uncertain	
Horshamosaurus	William T. Blows	2015	Weald Clay (Early Cretaceous, Hauterivian to Barremian)	England (West Sussex)	A supposed tibia has been reinterpreted as an ischium	
Hortalotarsus	Harry G. Seeley	1894	Clarens Formation (Early Jurassic, Pliensbachian to Toarcian)	South Africa (Eastern Cape)	Possible synonym of Massospondylus	
Houornis	Min Wang; Di Liu	2016	Jiufotang Formation (Early Cretaceous, Aptian)	China (Liaoning)	Once considered to be dubious or a species of Cathayornis, although a later study considered it to be a valid genus	
Huabeisaurus	Qiqing Pang; Zhengwu Cheng	2000	Huiquanpu Formation (Late Cretaceous, Campanian to Maastrichtian)	China (Shanxi)	Has been suggested to be closely related to Tangvayosaurus	
Hualianceratops	Fenglu Han; Catherine A. Forster; James M. Clark; Xing Xu	2015	Shishugou Formation (Middle Jurassic to Late Jurassic, Callovian to Oxfordian)	China (Xinjiang)	Had a series of bumps around the edge of the beak	
Huallasaurus	Sebastián Rozadilla; Federico Brissón-Eglí; Federico L. Agnolín; Alexis M. Aranciaga Rolando; Fernando E. Novas	2021	Los Alamitos Formation (Late Cretaceous, Campanian to Maastrichtian)	Argentina (Río Negro)	Remains originally misidentified as belonging to a southern species of Kritosaurus	
Huanansaurus	Junchang Lü; Hanyong Pu; Yoshitsugu Kobayashi; Li Xu; Huali Chang; Yuhua Shang; Di Liu; Yuong-Nam Lee; Martin Kundrát; Caizhi Shen	2015	Nanxiong Formation (Late Cretaceous, Maastrichtian)	China (Jiangxi)	Possessed a distinctive short trapezoidal crest	
Huanghetitan	Hailu You; Daqing Li; Lingqi Zhou; Qiang Ji	2006	Hekou Group (Early Cretaceous, Valanginian to Albian)	China (Gansu)	Had extremely long ribs which supported one of the deepest body cavities of any dinosaur	
Huangshanlong	Jiandong Huang; Hailu You; Jingtao Yang; Xinxin Ren	2014	Hongqin Formation (Middle Jurassic, Aalenian to Callovian)	China (Anhui)	Known from some bones of the right forelimb	
Huanhepterus	Zhiming Dong	1982	Huachihuanhe Formation (Early Cretaceous, Hauterivian)	China (Gansu)	A very close relative of Gnathosaurus	
Huaxiadraco	Rodrigo V. Pêgas: Xuanyu Zhou; Xingsheng Jin; Kai Wang; Waisum Ma	2023	Jiufotang Formation (Early Cretaceous, Aptian)	China (Liaoning)	Originally assigned to Huaxiapterus, which is now considered a synonym of Sinopterus	
Huaxiagnathus	Sunny H. Hwang; Mark A. Norell; Qiang Ji; Keqin Gao	2004	Yixian Formation (Early Cretaceous, Barremian)	China (Liaoning)	Slightly larger than the coeval Sinosauropteryx	
Huaxiazhoulong	Ziheng Zhu; Jie Wu; Yue You; Yingli Jia; Chujiao Chen; Xi Yao; Wenjie Zheng; Xing Xu	2025	Tangbian Formation (Late Cretaceous, Campanian)	China (Jiangxi)	Known from a nearly complete, well-preserved skeleton	
Huayangosaurus	Zhiming Dong; Zilu Tang; Shiwu Zhou	1982	Xiashaximiao Formation (Middle Jurassic to Late Jurassic, Bathonian to Oxfordian)	China (Sichuan)	Possessed flank osteoderms and a small tail club in addition to plates and spikes	
Hudiesaurus	Zhiming Dong	1997	Kalaza Formation (Late Jurassic, Xinjiang)	China (Xinjiang)	Had a butterfly-shaped process on its vertebra	
Huehuecanauhtlus	Angel A. Ramírez-Velasco; Mouloud Benammi; Albert Prieto-Márquez; Jesús A. Ortega; René Hernández-Rivera	2012	Cutzamala Formation (Late Cretaceous, Santonian)	Mexico (Michoacán)	The southernmost non-hadrosaurid hadrosauroid known from North America	
Huinculsaurus	Mattia A. Baiano; Rodolfo A. Coria; Andrea Cau	2020	Huincul Formation (Late Cretaceous, Cenomanian to Turonian)	Argentina (Neuquén)	The youngest known elaphrosaurine	
Hulsanpes	Halszka Osmólska	1982	Baruungoyot Formation (Late Cretaceous, Maastrichtian)	Mongolia (Ömnögovi)	Closely related to Halszkaraptor but appears to be more cursorial	
Hungarosaurus	Attila Ősi	2005	Csehbánya Formation (Late Cretaceous, Santonian)	Hungary (Veszprém)	Possessed an elevated shoulder which may be an adaptation to high-browsing	
Huoshanornis	Xia Wang; Zihui Zhang; Chunling Gao; Lianhai Hou; Qingjin Meng; Jinyuan Liu	2010	Jiufotang Formation (Early Cretaceous, Aptian)	China (Liaoning)	May have been a very maneuverable flier due to the structure of its hand and sternum	
Hylaeosaurus	Gideon A. Mantell	1833	Tunbridge Wells Sand Formation (Early Cretaceous, Valanginian)	England (West Sussex)	One of the three animals originally used to define the Dinosauria, along with Iguanodon and Megalosaurus	
Hypacrosaurus	Barnum Brown	1913	Horseshoe Canyon Formation (Late Cretaceous, Maastrichtian)	Canada (Alberta)	Some juveniles of this genus were originally interpreted as dwarf lambeosaurines	
Hypnovenator	Katsuhiro Kubota; Yoshitsugu Kobayashi; Tadahiro Ikeda	2024	Ohyamashimo Formation (Early Cretaceous, Albian)	Japan (Hyōgo)	The first troodontid named from Japan	
Hypselosaurus	Philippe Matheron	1869	Argiles et Grès à Reptiles Formation (Late Cretaceous, Campanian)	France (Provence-Alpes-Côte d'Azur)	Several spherical eggs have been attributed to this taxon	
Hypselospinus	David B. Norman	2010	Wadhurst Clay Formation (Early Cretaceous, Valanginian)	England (East Sussex)	Had elongated neural spines projecting from the top of its vertebrae	
Hypsibema	Edward D. Cope	1869	Tar Heel/Coachman Formation (Late Cretaceous, Campanian)	United States (North Carolina)	Potentially one of the largest non-hadrosaurid hadrosauroids	
Hypsilophodon	Thomas H. Huxley	1870	Wessex Formation (Early Cretaceous, Barremian)	England (Isle of Wight)	May have been a deer-like low browser that fed on young shoots and roots	
Hypsirhophus	Edward D. Cope	1878	Morrison Formation (Late Jurassic, Tithonian)	United States (Colorado)	Usually seen as synonymous with Stegosaurus but may be a separate genus due to differences in its vertebrae	
Iaceornis	Julia A. Clarke	2004	Niobrara Formation (Late Cretaceous, Coniacian to Campanian)	United States (Kansas)	May have been closer to crown birds than the contemporary Ichthyornis	
Iani	Lindsay E. Zanno; Terry A. Gates; Haviv M. Avrahami; Ryan T. Tucker; Peter J. Makovicky	2023	Cedar Mountain Formation (Early Cretaceous to Late Cretaceous, Albian to Cenomanian)	United States (Utah)	Represents the family Tenontosauridae, a clade of North American rhabdodontomorphs	
Iberodactylus	Borja Holgado; Rodrigo V. Pêgas; José I. Canudo; Josep Fortuny; Taissa Rodrigues; Julio Company; Alexander W. A. Kellner	2019	Blesa Formation (Early Cretaceous, Barremian)	Spain (Aragon)	Shows affinities to the Asian Hamipterus	
Iberomesornis	José L. Sanz; José F. Bonaparte	1992	La Huérguina Formation (Early Cretaceous, Barremian)	Spain (Castilla-La Mancha)	One of the first genera of enantiornitheans known from decent remains	
Iberospinus	Octávio Mateus; Dario Estraviz-López	2022	Papo Seco Formation (Early Cretaceous, Barremian)	Portugal (Setúbal)	Basal yet already displays some adaptations for a semiaquatic lifestyle	
Ibirania	Bruno A. Navarro; Aline M. Ghilardi; Tito Aureliano; Verónica Díez Díaz; Kamila L. N. Bandeira; André G. S. Cattaruzzi; Fabiano V. Iori; Ariel M. Martine; Alberto B. Carvalho; Luiz E. Anelli; Marcelo A. Fernandes; Hussam Zaher	2022	São José do Rio Preto Formation (Late Cretaceous, Santonian to Campanian)	Brazil (São Paulo)	May have attained its small size due to its arid inland habitat, unlike other dwarf titanosaurs which were affected by insular dwarfism	
Ichthyornis	Othniel C. Marsh	1873	Austin Chalk (Late Cretaceous, Coniacian to Santonian); Chico Formation (Late Cretaceous, Campanian); Gober Formation (Late Cretaceous, Campanian); Kaskapau Formation (Late Cretaceous, Turonian to Coniacian); Mancos Shale (Late Cretaceous, Turonian; Mooreville Chalk (Late Cretaceous, Santonian); Niobrara Formation (Late Cretaceous, Coniacian to Campanian)*; Pflugerville Formation (Late Cretaceous, Campanian); Vermillion River Formation (Late Cretaceous, Campanian)	Canada (Alberta); Mexico (Coahuila); United States (Alabama; California; Kansas*; New Mexico; Texas)	A well-known gull-like avialan with a large toothed head	
Ichthyovenator	Ronan Allain; Tiengkham Xaisanavong; Philippe Richir; Bounsou Khentavong	2012	Grès supérieurs Formation (Early Cretaceous, Aptian to Albian)	Laos (Savannakhet)	One of its sacral vertebrae was greatly reduced, giving the illusion of a break in its sail or of two separate sails	
Igai	Eric Gorscak; Matthew C. Lamanna; Daniela Schwarz; Verónica Díez Díaz; Belal S. Salem; Hesham M. Sallam; Marc F. Wiechmann	2022	Quseir Formation (Late Cretaceous, Campanian)	Egypt (New Valley)	More closely related to European titanosaurs than to southern African ones	
Ignavusaurus	Fabien Knoll	2010	Upper Elliot Formation (Early Jurassic, Sinemurian to Pliensbachian)	Lesotho (Qacha's Nek)	Only known from a single, mostly articulated juvenile skeleton with a badly crushed skull	
Ignotosaurus	Ricardo N. Martínez; Cecilia Apaldetti; Oscar A. Alcober; Carina E. Colombi; Paul C. Sereno; Eliana Fernandez; Paula S. Malnis; Gustavo A. Correa; Diego Abelin	2012	Ischigualasto Formation (Late Triassic, Carnian to Norian)	Argentina (San Juan)	Only known from a single right ilium	
Iguanacolossus	Andrew T. McDonald; James I. Kirkland; Donald D. DeBlieux; Scott K. Madsen; Jennifer Cavin; Andrew R. C. Milner; Lukas Panzarin	2010	Cedar Mountain Formation (Early Cretaceous, Berriasian to Valanginian)	United States (Utah)	Large and robustly built for an ornithopod	
Iguanodon	Gideon A. Mantell	1825	Arcillas de Morella Formation (Early Cretaceous, Barremian); Camarillas Formation (Early Cretaceous, Barremian); Sainte-Barbe Clays Formation (Early Cretaceous, Barremian to Aptian)*; Weald Clay (Early Cretaceous, Hauterivian to Barremian); Wealden Group (Early Cretaceous, Berriasian to Aptian); Wessex Formation (Early Cretaceous, Barremian)	Belgium (Wallonia*); England (Isle of Wight; West Sussex) (Spain; Aragon; Valencia)	Multiple remains are known which make it one of the best known dinosaurs	
Ikrandraco	Xiaolin Wang; Taissa Rodrigues; Shunxing Jiang; Xin Cheng; Alexander W. A. Kellner	2014	Cambridge Greensand (Early Cretaceous, Albian); Jiufotang Formation (Early Cretaceous, Aptian)*	China (Liaoning*); England (Cambridgeshire)	Had a rounded crest on the lower jaw originally interpreted as an adaptation for skim-feeding, but this is unlikely	
Ilerdopteryx	Antoni Lacasa Ruiz	1985	La Pedrera de Rúbies Formation (Early Cretaceous, Berriasian to Barremian)	Spain (Catalonia)	Only known from isolated contour feathers	
Iliosuchus	Friedrich von Huene	1932	Taynton Limestone Formation (Middle Jurassic, Bathonian)	England (Oxfordshire)	Only known from three ilia	
Ilokelesia	Rodolfo A. Coria; Leonardo J. Salgado	1998	Huincul Formation (Late Cretaceous, Cenomanian to Turonian)	Argentina (Neuquén)	Its skull retains some basal abelisauroid traits	
Imparavis	Xiaoli Wang; Alexander D. Clark; Jingmai K. O'Connor; Xiangyu Zhang; Xing Wang; Xiaoting Zheng; Zhonghe Zhou	2024	Jiufotang Formation (Early Cretaceous, Aptian)	China (Liaoning)	The earliest known enantiornithean with a toothless beak	
Imperobator	Ricardo C. Ely; Judd A. Case	2019	Snow Hill Island Formation (Late Cretaceous, Maastrichtian)	Antarctica (Argentine Antarctica; British Antarctic Territory; Chilean Antarctic Territory)	Initially described as a basal paravian although it may potentially be an unenlagiine	
Inabtanin	Kierstin L. Rosenbach; Danielle M. Goodvin; Mohammed G. Albshysh; Hassan A. Azzam; Ahmad A. Smadi; Hakam A. Mustafa; Iyad S. A. Zalmout; Jeffrey A. Wilson Mantilla	2024	Muwaqqar Chalk-Marl Formation (Late Cretaceous, Maastrichtian)	Jordan (Zarqa)	May have been adapted for flapping, rather than soaring, flight	
Inawentu	Leonardo S. Filippi; Rubén D. Juárez Valieri; Pablo A. Gallina; Ariel H. Méndez; Federico A. Gianechini; Alberto C. Garrido	2024	Bajo de la Carpa Formation (Late Cretaceous, Santonian)	Argentina (Neuquén)	Possessed a short neck and squared-off snout, convergent with the rebbachisaurids that went extinct shortly before this genus lived	
Incisivosaurus	Xing Xu; Yennien Cheng; Xiaolin Wang; Chunhsiang Chang	2002	Yixian Formation (Early Cretaceous, Barremian)	China (Liaoning)	Two specimens of different ontogenetic stages are known, both with differing types of feathers	
Incolornis	Andrey V. Panteleyev	1998	Bissekty Formation (Late Cretaceous, Turonian)	Uzbekistan (Navoiy)	One species was once considered to belong to Enantiornis	
Indosaurus	Friedrich von Huene; Charles A. Matley	1933	Lameta Formation (Late Cretaceous, Maastrichtian)	India (Madhya Pradesh)	Had a characteristically thickened skull	
Indosuchus	Friedrich von Huene; Charles A. Matley	1933	Lameta Formation (Late Cretaceous, Maastrichtian)	India (Madhya Pradesh)	Its skull was flattened and topped by a short crest	
Ingentia	Cecilia Apaldetti; Ricardo N. Martínez; Ignacio A. Cerda; Diego Pol; Oscar Alcober	2018	Quebrada del Barro Formation (Late Triassic, Norian)	Argentina (San Juan)	One of the earliest known very large sauropodomorphs	
Inosaurus	Albert-Félix de Lapparent	1960	Irhazer Shale (Middle Jurassic, Bajocian to Bathonian)	Niger (Agadez)	A very poorly known theropod	
Intiornis	Fernando E. Novas; Federico L. Agnolín; Carlos A. Scanferla	2010	Las Curtiembres Formation (Late Cretaceous, Campanian)	Argentina (Salta)	Although closely related to some of the largest avisaurids, members of this genus were very small birds	
Invictarx	Andrew T. McDonald; Douglas G. Wolfe	2018	Menefee Formation (Late Cretaceous, Campanian)	United States (New Mexico)	Only known from a few bones but can be distinguished from other genera by characters of its osteoderms	
Irisosaurus	Claire Peyre de Fabrègues; Shundong Bi; Hongqing Li; Gang Li; Lei Yang; Xing Xu	2020	Fengjiahe Formation (Early Jurassic, Pliensbachian)	China (Yunnan)	Closely related to Mussaurus	
Irritator	David M. Martill; Arthur R.I. Cruickshank; Eberhard Frey; Philip G. Small; Maria Clarke	1996	Romualdo Formation (Early Cretaceous, Albian)	Brazil (Ceará)	May have been the apex predator of its habitat, hunting both aquatic and terrestrial prey	
Isaberrysaura	Leonardo Salgado; José I. Canudo; Alberto C. Garrido; Miguel Moreno-Azanza; Leandro C. A. Martínez; Rodolfo A. Coria; José M. Gasca	2017	Los Molles Formation (Middle Jurassic, Callovian)	Argentina (Neuquén)	Preserves gut contents including whole seeds	
Isanosaurus	Eric Buffetaut; Varavudh Suteethorn; Gilles Cuny; Haiyan Tong; Jean Le Loeuff; Sasidhorn Khansubha; Sutee Jongautchariyakul	2000	Nam Phong Formation (Late Triassic, Norian)	Thailand (Khon Kaen)	May have actually come from the Early Jurassic or even the Late Jurassic	
Isasicursor	Fernando E. Novas; Federico L. Agnolín; Sebastián Rozadilla; Alexis Mauro Aranciaga Rolando; Federico Brissón-Eglí; Matías J. Motta; Mauricio Cerroni; Martín D/ Ezcurra; Agustín G. Martinelli; Julia S. D'Angelo; Gerardo Alvarez-Herrera; Adriel R. Gentil; Sergio Bogan; Nicolás R. Chimento; Jordi A. García Marsà; Gastón Lo Coco; Sergio E. Miquel; Fátima F. Brito; Ezequiel I. Vera; Valeria S. Perez Loinaze; Mariela S. Fernández; Leonardo Salgado	2019	Chorrillo Formation (Late Cretaceous, Maastrichtian)	Argentina (Santa Cruz)	Four individuals of different ages were found together, suggesting it lived in herds	
Ischioceratops	Yiming He; Peter J. Makovicky; Kebai Wang; Shuqing Chen; Corwin Sullivan; Fenglu Han; Xing Xu	2015	Wangshi Group (Late Cretaceous, Campanian)	China (Shandong)	Named for its peculiarly shaped ischium	
Isisaurus	Jeffrey A. Wilson; Paul Upchurch	2003	Lameta Formation (Late Cretaceous, Maastrichtian)	India (Maharashtra)	Unusually proportioned with a short, robust neck and long limbs	
Issi	Victor Beccari; Octávio Mateus; Oliver Wings; Jesper Milàn; Lars B. Clemmensen	2021	Malmros Klint Formation (Late Triassic, Norian)	Greenland (Sermersooq)	Originally described as an exemplar of Plateosaurus	
Istiodactylus	Stafford C. Howse; Andrew C. Milner; David M. Martill	2001	Jiufotang Formation (Early Cretaceous, Aptian); Wessex Formation (Early Cretaceous, Barremian)*	China (Liaoning); England (Isle of Wight*)	Had a duck-like bill with small teeth that may have been adaptated for vulture-like soaring scavenging	
Itapeuasaurus	Rafael M. Lindoso; Manuel A. A. Medeiros; Ismar S. Carvalho; Agostinha A. Pereira; Ighor D. Mendes; Fabiano V. Iori; Eliane P. Sousa; Silvia H. S. Arcanjo; Taciane C. M. Silva	2019	Alcântara Formation (Late Cretaceous, Cenomanian)	Brazil (Maranhão)	The holotype is known from six vertebrae	
Itemirus	Sergei M. Kurzanov	1976	Bissekty Formation (Late Cretaceous, Turonian)	Uzbekistan (Navoiy)	Originally known from a braincase but abundant new remains were described later	
Iteravis	Shuang Zhou; Jingmai K. O'Connor; Min Wang	2014	Yixian Formation (Early Cretaceous, Barremian)	China (Liaoning)	Very common throughout its locality, revealing much about its anatomy	
Iuticosaurus	Jean Le Loeuff	1993	Upper Greensand Formation (Early Cretaceous to Late Cretaceous, Albian to Cenomanian); Wessex Formation (Early Cretaceous, Barremian)*	England (Isle of Wight)	Two species have been named, each from a single caudal vertebra	
Ixalerpeton	Sergio F. Cabreira; Alexander W. A. Kellner; Sérgio Dias-da-Silva; Lúcio R. da Silva; Mario Bronzati; Júlio C. A. Marsola; Rodrigo T. Müller; Jonathas S. Bittencourt; Brunna J. Batista; Tiago Raugust; Rodrigo Carrilho; André Brodt; Max C. Langer	2016	Candelária Sequence (Late Triassic, Carnian)	Brazil (Rio Grande do Sul)	Found alongside the dinosaur Buriolestes, suggesting that dinosaurs did not rapidly replace other groups of avemetatarsalians	
Iyuku	Catherine A. Forster; William J. de Klerk; Karen E. Poole; Anusuya Chinsamy-Turan; Eric M. Roberts; Callum F. Ross	2023	Kirkwood Formation (Early Cretaceous, Berriasian to Hauterivian)	South Africa (Eastern Cape)	Uniquely known from an assemblage of mostly hatchling and juvenile fossils	
Jaculinykus	Kohta Kubo; Yoshitsugu Kobayashi; Chinzorig Tsogtbaatar; Khishigjav Tsogtbaatar	2023	Baruungoyot Formation (Late Cretaceous, Maastrichtian)	Mongolia (Ömnögovi)	Was didactyl, with a large first finger and a reduced second finger	
Jainosaurus	Adrian P. Hunt; Martin G. Lockley; Spencer G. Lucas; Christian A. Meyer	1994	Lameta Formation (Late Cretaceous, Maastrichtian)	India (Madhya Pradesh)	Originally named as a species of Antarctosaurus	
Jakapil	Facundo J. Riguetti; Sebastián Apesteguía; Xabier Pereda-Suberbiola	2022	Candeleros Formation (Late Cretaceous, Cenomanian)	Argentina (Río Negro)	May represent a novel lineage of ornithischians characterized by small size, deep jaws, and a bipedal stance	
Jaklapallisaurus	Fernando E. Novas; Martín D. Ezcurra; Sankar Chatterjee; T. S. Kutty	2010	Upper Maleri Formation (Late Triassic, Norian)	India (Telangana)	May have been closely related to South American sauropodomorphs	
Janavis	Juan Benito; Peichen Kuo; Klara E. Widrig; John W. M. Jagt; Daniel J. Field	2022	Maastricht Formation (Late Cretaceous, Maastrichtian)	Belgium (Wallonia)	A large, late-surviving toothed bird that preserves a neognathous-type jaw	
Janenschia	Rupert Wild	1991	Tendaguru Formation (Late Jurassic, Kimmeridgian to Tithonian)	Tanzania (Lindi)	Potentially a close relative of Haestasaurus, Tehuelchesaurus, and possibly Bellusaurus, all of which may form a unique clade of eusauropods with possible turiasaur affinities	
Jaxartosaurus	Anatoly N. Riabinin	1939	Dabrazinskaya Svita (Late Cretaceous, Santonian to Campanian)	Kazakhstan (Turkistan)	Not known from many remains but they are enough to tell that it was a basal lambeosaurine	
Jeholopterus	Xiaolin Wang; Zhonghe Zhou; Fucheng Zhang; Xing Xu	2002	Tiaojishan Formation (Late Jurassic, Oxfordian)	China (Inner Mongolia)	Had been suggested to have a blood-sucking ecology similar to vampire bats, but this is not considered likely	
Jeholornis	Zhonghe Zhou; Fucheng Zhang	2002	Jiufotang Formation (Early Cretaceous, Aptian)*; Yixian Formation (Early Cretaceous, Barremian)	China (Hebei*; Liaoning)	Had palm tree-like sets of feathers at both the base and tip of the tail	
Jeholosaurus	Xing Xu; Xiaolin Wang; Hailu You	2000	Yixian Formation (Early Cretaceous, Barremian)	China (Liaoning)	One specimen is preserved in a curled up position	
Jeyawati	Andrew T. McDonald; Douglas G. Wolfe; James I. Kirkland	2010	Moreno Hill Formation (Late Cretaceous, Turonian to Coniacian)	United States (New Mexico)	Its postorbital bone had a rugose texture	
Jianchangnathus	Xin Cheng; Xiaolin Wang; Shunxing Jiang; Alexander W. A. Kellner	2012	Tiaojishan Formation (Late Jurassic, Oxfordian)	China (Liaoning)	One referred specimen suggests it had brown pycnofibers	
Jianchangopterus	Junchang Lü; Xue Bo	2011	Tiaojishan Formation (Late Jurassic, Oxfordian)	China (Liaoning)	Probably a close relative of Sordes	
Jianchangornis	Zhonghe Zhou; Fucheng Zhang; Zhiheng Li	2009	Jiufotang Formation (Early Cretaceous, Aptian)	China (Liaoning)	Had unusually small dentary teeth	
Jianchangosaurus	Hanyong Pu; Yoshitsugu Kobayashi; Junchang Lü; Li Xu; Yanhua Wu; Huali Chang; Jiming Zhang; Songhai Jia	2013	Yixian Formation (Early Cretaceous, Barremian)	China (Liaoning)	Several characters of its teeth and jaws have been described as convergently similar to those of ornithischians	
Jiangjunosaurus	Chengkai Jia; Catherine A. Forster; Xing Xu; James M. Clark	2007	Shishugou Formation (Middle Jurassic to Late Jurassic, Callovian to Oxfordian)	China (Xinjiang)	Had two rows of circular or diamond-shaped plates	
Jiangshanosaurus	Feng Tang; Ximin Kang; Xingsheng Jin; Feng Wei; Weitang Wu	2001	Jinhua Formation (Late Cretaceous, Turonian to Coniacian)	China (Zhejiang)	A potential member of the Euhelopodidae	
Jiangxisaurus	Xuefang Wei; Hanyong Pu; Li Xu; Di Liu; Junchang Lü	2013	Nanxiong Formation (Late Cretaceous, Maastrichtian)	China (Jiangxi)	Overall similar to Heyuannia but with a thinner, frailer mandible	
Jiangxititan	Jinyou Mo; Qiongyao Fu; Yilun Yu; Xing Xu	2024	Nanxiong Formation (Late Cretaceous, Maastrichtian)	China (Jiangxi)	Although originally described as a titanosaur, a later analysis recovers it as a somphospondylian placed outside of that group	
Jianianhualong	Xing Xu; Philip J. Currie; Michael Pittman; Lida Xing; Qingjin Meng; Junchang Lü; Dongyu Hu; Congyu Yu	2017	Yixian Formation (Early Cretaceous, Barremian)	China (Liaoning)	Possessed a subtriangular tail frond made of asymmetrical feathers, although it was most likely flightless	
Jibeinia	Lianhai Hou	1997	Huajiying Formation (Early Cretaceous, Hauterivian)	China (Hebei)	Poorly known and described from a skeleton which has now been lost	
Jidapterus	Zhiming Dong; Yuewu Sun; Shaoyuan Wu	2003	Jiufotang Formation (Early Cretaceous, Aptian)	China (Liaoning)	Once believed to a tapejarid	
Jinbeisaurus	Xiaochun Wu; Jianru Shi; Liyang Dong; Thomas D. Carr; Jian Yi; Shichao Xu	2020	Huiquanpu Formation (Late Cretaceous, Campanian to Maastrichtian)	China (Shanxi)	The original describers interpreted it as a medium-sized adult tyrannosauroid, but more recently it has been reinterpreted as a juvenile, probably from a derived tyrannosaurine	
Jinfengopteryx	Qiang Ji; Shu-An Ji; Junchang Lü; Hai;u You; Wen Chen; Yongqing Liu; Yanxue Liu	2005	Huajiying Formation (Early Cretaceous, Hauterivian)	China (Hebei)	May have been capable of some sort of flight	
Jingiella	Xinxin Ren; Xuri Wang; Yannan Ji; Zhen Guo; Qiang Ji	2025	Dongxing Formation (Late Jurassic, Kimmeridgian)	China (Guangxi)	Initially named Jingia but that name is already in use by a moth	
Jingshanosaurus	Yihong Zhang; Zhaolong Yang	1994	Lufeng Formation (Early Jurassic, Hettangian)	China (Yunnan)	One of the latest-surviving non-sauropod sauropodomorphs	
Jinguofortis	Min Wang; Thomas A. Stidham; Zhonghe Zhou	2018	Dabeigou Formation (Early Cretaceous, Valanginian to Hauterivian)	China (Hebei)	Possesses a mosaic of features of several groups of basal avialans	
Jintasaurus	Hailu You; Daqing Li	2009	Xinminbao Group (Early Cretaceous, Barremian to Aptian)	China (Gansu)	Known from only the rear half of a skull, including a complete braincase	
Jinyunpelta	Wenjie Zheng; Xingsheng Jin; Yoichi Azuma; Qiongying Wang; Kazunori Miyata; Xing Xu	2018	Liangtoutang Formation (Early Cretaceous to Late Cretaceous, Albian to Cenomanian)	China (Zhejiang)	The oldest ankylosaurid known to have a rounded tail club	
Jinzhousaurus	Xiaolin Wang; Xing Xu	2001	Yixian Formation (Early Cretaceous, Barremian)	China (Liaoning)	Its holotype is nearly complete, preserved whole on a single slab	
Jiuquanornis	Yaming Wang; Jingmai K. O'Connor; Daqing Li; Hailu You	2013	Xiagou Formation (Early Cretaceous, Aptian)	China (Gansu)	Its presence in its formation alongside other ornithuromorphs suggests it represents a shift in avifaunal dominance to them from enantiornitheans	
Jiutaisaurus	Wenhao Wu; Zhiming Dong; Yuewu Sun; Chuntian Li; Tao Li	2006	Quantou Formation (Early Cretaceous to Late Cretaceous, Aptian to Cenomanian)	China (Jilin)	Named based on eighteen vertebrae	
Jixiangornis	Qiang Ji; Shu-An Ji; Hongbin Zhang; Hailu You; Jianping Zhang; Lixia Wang; Chongxi Yuan; Xinxin Ji	2002	Yixian Formation (Early Cretaceous, Barremian)	China (Liaoning)	Similar to Jeholornis but toothless and may be more advanced	
Jobaria	Paul C. Sereno; Allison L. Beck; Didier B. Dutheil; Hans C. E. Larsson; Gabrielle H. Lyon; Bourahima Moussa; Rudyard W. Sadleir; Christian A. Sidor; David J. Varricchio; Gregory P. Wilson; Jeffrey A. Wilson	1999	Tiourarén Formation (Middle Jurassic to Late Jurassic, Bathonian to Oxfordian)	Niger (Agadez)	Known from an almost complete skeleton	
Jubbulpuria	Friedrich von Huene; Charles A. Matley	1933	Lameta Formation (Late Cretaceous, Maastrichtian)	India (Madhya Pradesh)	Potentially synonymous with Laevisuchus	
Judiceratops	Nicholas R. Longrich	2013	Judith River Formation (Late Cretaceous, Campanian)	United States (Montana)	Unusually, its brow horns were teardrop-shaped in cross-section	
Judinornis	Lev A. Nessov; L. J. Borkin	1983	Nemegt Formation (Late Cretaceous, Maastrichtian)	Mongolia (Ömnögovi)	One of the few hesperornitheans not known from marine sediments	
Juehuaornis	Renfe Wang; Yan Wang; Dongyu Hu	2015	Jiufotang Formation (Early Cretaceous, Aptian)	China (Liaoning)	May be a senior synonym of Changzuiornis and Dingavis	
Junornis	Di Liu; Luis M. Chiappe; Francisco Serrano; Michael B. Habib>br>- Yuguang Zhang; Qinjing Meng	2017	Yixian Formation (Early Cretaceous, Barremian)	China (Inner Mongolia)	So well preserved that its flight pattern could be reconstructed using the proportions of its feathers and wings	
Juratyrant	Stephen L. Brusatte; Roger B.J. Benson	2013	Kimmeridge Clay (Late Jurassic, Tithonian)	England (Dorset)	Originally named as a species of Stokesosaurus	
Juravenator	Ursula B. Göhlich; Luis M. Chiappe	2006	Torleite Formation (Late Jurassic, Kimmeridgian)	Germany (Bavaria)	The tail preserves structures that may be integumentary sense organs like those of crocodiles, which it may have used to prey on fish at night	
Kaatedocus	Emanuel Tschopp; Octávio Mateus	2013	Morrison Formation (Late Jurassic, Kimmeridgian to Tithonian)	United States (Wyoming)	Originally interpreted as a diplodocid although one study finds it to be more likely a basal dicraeosaurid	
Kaijiangosaurus	Xinlu He	1984	Xiashaximiao Formation (Middle Jurassic to Late Jurassic, Bathonian to Oxfordian)	China (Sichuan)	Potentially synonymous with other medium-sized Shaximiao theropods	
Kaijutitan	Leonardo S. Filippi; Leonardo Salgado; Alberto C. Garrido	2019	Sierra Barrosa Formation (Late Cretaceous, Coniacian)	Argentina (Neuquén)	One of the latest-surviving basal titanosaurs	
Kakuru	Ralph E. Molnar; Neville S. Pledge	1980	Bulldog Shale (Early Cretaceous, Aptian to Albian)	Australia (South Australia)	A poorly known possible unenlagiine	
Kamuysaurus	Yoshitsugu Kobayashi; Tomohiro Nishimura; Ryuji Takasaki; Kentaro Chiba; Anthony R. Fiorillo; Kohei Tanaka; Tsogtbaatar Chinzorig; Tamaki Sato; Kazuhiko Sakurai	2019	Hakobuchi Formation (Late Cretaceous, Maastrichtian)	Japan (Hokkaido)	Informally referred to as "Mukawaryu" before its formal description	
Kangnasaurus	Sidney H. Haughton	1915	Kalahari Deposits (Late Cretaceous, Campanian to Maastrichtian)	South Africa (Northern Cape)	Potentially the first elasmarian known from Africa	
Kansaignathus	Alexander O. Averianov; Alexey V. Lopatin	2021	Ialovachsk Formation (Late Cretaceous, Santonian)	Tajikistan (Sughd)	The first non-avian dinosaur described from Tajikistan	
Kaririavis	Ismar S. Carvalho; Federico L. Agnolín; Sebastián Rozadilla; Fernando E. Novas; José A. Ferreira Gomes Andrade; José Xavier-Neto	2021	Crato Formation (Early Cretaceous, Aptian)	Brazil (Ceará)	The oldest ornithuromorph known from Gondwana	
Kariridraco	Gabriela M. Cerqueira: Mateus A.C. Santos; Maikon F. Marks; Juliana M. Sayão; Felipe L. Pinheiro	2021	Romualdo Formation (Early Cretaceous, Albian)	Brazil (Ceará)	The specific name dianae honors Diana Prince, alter ego of DC superhero Wonder Woman	
Karongasaurus	Elizabeth M. Gomani	2005	Dinosaur Beds (Early Cretaceous, Barremian to Aptian)	Malawi (Northern Region)	Described from only a mandible and isolated teeth	
Katepensaurus	Lucio M. Ibiricu; Gabriel A. Casal; Rubén D. F. Martínez; Matthew C. Lamanna; Marcelo Luna; Leonardo Salgado	2013	Bajo Barreal Formation (Late Cretaceous, Cenomanian to Turonian)	Argentina (Chubut)	Distinguished by a certain opening in its dorsal vertebrae	
Kayentavenator	Robert J. Gay	2010	Kayenta Formation (Early Jurassic, Sinemurian to Toarcian)	United States (Arizona)	Described in a book published through an online print-on-demand service	
Kazaklambia	Phil R. Bell; Kirstin S. Brink	2013	Dabrazinskaya Svita (Late Cretaceous, Santonian to Campanian)	Kazakhstan (Turkistan)	Morphologically distinct from other Eurasian lambeosaurines	
Kelmayisaurus	Zhiming Dong	1973	Lianmuqin Formation (Early Cretaceous, Aptian to Albian)	China (Xinjiang)	One popular book mentions a giant species belonging to this genus, but this referral may be incorrect	
Kelumapusaura	Sebastián Rozadilla; Federico Brissón-Eglí; Federico L. Agnolín; Alexis M. Aranciaga Rolando; Fernando E. Novas	2021	Allen Formation (Late Cretaceous, Maastrichtian)	Argentina (Río Negro)	Known from the remains of various individuals	
Kentrosaurus	Edwin Hennig	1915	Tendaguru Formation (Late Jurassic, Oxfordian to Tithonian)	Tanzania (Lindi)	Possessed two rows of plates that gradually transitioned into spikes towards the tail, as well as a long spike on each shoulder	
Kepodactylus	Jerald D. Harris; Kenneth Carpenter	1996	Morrison Formation (Late Jurassic, Kimmeridgian)	United States (Colorado)	Found associated with bones of a Stegosaurus	
Kerberosaurus	Yuri L. Bolotsky; Pascal Godefroit	2004	Tsagayan Formation (Late Cretaceous, Maastrichtian)	Russia (Amur Oblast)	Potentially a close relative of Edmontosaurus	
Keresdrakon	Alexander W. A. Kellner; Luiz C. Weinschütz; Borja Holgado; Renan A. M. Bantim; Juliana M. Sayão	2019	Goio-Erê Formation (Early Cretaceous, Aptian to Albian)	Brazil (Paraná)	Had a long toothless beak similar to many more derived azhdarchoids	
Khaan	James M. Clark; Mark A. Norell; Rinchen Barsbold	2001	Djadokhta Formation (Late Cretaceous, Campanian)	Mongolia (Ömnögovi)	Two morphotypes of chevrons are known, which may be a sexually dimorphic trait	
Khinganornis	Xuri Wang; Andrea Cau; Martin Kundrát; Luis M. Chiappe; Qiang Ji; Yang Wang; Tao Li; Wenhao Wu	2021	Longjiang Formation (Early Cretaceous, Barremian to Aptian)	China (Inner Mongolia)	Had long legs and large toes which suggest a wading ecology	
Kholumolumo	Claire Peyre de Fabrègues; Ronan Allain	2019	Lower Elliot Formation (Late Triassic, Norian)	Lesotho (Mohale's Hoek)	Before its formal description, it had been informally referred to as "Kholumolumosaurus" and "Thotobolosaurus"	
Khulsanurus	Alexander O. Averianov; Alexey V. Lopatin	2022	Baruungoyot Formation (Late Cretaceous, Maastrichtian)	Mongolia (Ömnögovi)	Contemporary with Parvicursor but can be distinguished by characters of its caudal vertebra	
Kileskus	Alexander O. Averianov; S. A. Krasnolutskii; S. V. Ivantsov	2010	Itat Formation (Middle Jurassic, Bajocian to Bathonian)	Russia (Krasnoyarsk Krai)	Uncertain if it possesses the head crest as seen in other proceratosaurids	
Kinnareemimus	Eric Buffetaut; Varavudh Suteethorn; Haiyan Tong	2009	Sao Khua Formation (Early Cretaceous, Valanginian to Hauterivian)	Thailand (Khon Kaen)	Potentially one of the oldest ornithomimosaurs	
Kiyacursor	Alexander O. Averianov; Pavel P. Skutschas; Andrey A. Atuchin; Dmitry A. Slobodin; Olga A. Feofanova; Olga N. Vladimirova	2024	Ilek Formation (Early Cretaceous, Barremian to Aptian)	Russia (Kemerovo Oblast)	Represents a relict population of Jurassic noasaurids	
Kizylkumavis	Lev A. Nessov	1984	Bissekty Formation (Late Cretaceous, Turonian)	Uzbekistan (Navoiy)	Known only from a humerus fragment	
Klamelisaurus	Xijin Zhao	1993	Shishugou Formation (Middle Jurassic, Callovian)	China (Xinjiang)	Close relatives included several referred species of Mamenchisaurus	
Klobiodon	Michael O'Sullivan; David M. Martill	2018	Taynton Limestone Formation (Middle Jurassic, Bathonian)	England (Oxfordshire)	The specific name rochei honors Nick Roche, who is known for his anatomically accurate dinosaur comic characters	
Kol	Alan H. Turner; Sterling J. Nesbitt; Mark A. Norell	2009	Djadokhta Formation (Late Cretaceous, Campanian)	Mongolia (Ömnögovi)	Had a "hyperarctometatarsus" more strongly pinched than other arctometatarsalian taxa	
Koleken	Diego Pol; Mattia A. Baiano; David Černý; Fernando E. Novas; Ignacio A. Cerda; Michael Pittman	2024	La Colonia Formation (Late Cretaceous, Maastrichtian)	Argentina (Chubut)	Contemporary with its larger relative Carnotaurus, but differs from it in part due to its lack of horns	
Kompsornis	Xuri Wang; Jiandong Huang; Martin Kundrát; Andrea Cau; Xiaoyu Liu; Yang Wang; Shubin Ju	2020	Jiufotang Formation (Early Cretaceous, Aptian)	China (Liaoning)	Was a powerful flier compared to other jeholornithiforms based on its keeled sternum	
Kongonaphon	Christian F. Kammerer; Sterling J. Nesbitt; John J. Flynn; Lovasoa Ranivoharimanana; André R. Wyss	2020	Makay Formation (Middle Triassic to Late Triassic, Ladinian to Carnian)	Madagascar (Menabe)	Tiny and probably an insectivore based on the shape of its teeth	
Kookne	Fernando E. Novas; Federico L. Agnolín; Sebastián Rozadilla; Alexis Mauro Aranciaga Rolando; Federico Brissón-Eglí; Matías J. Motta; Mauricio Cerroni; Martín D/ Ezcurra; Agustín G. Martinelli; Julia S. D'Angelo; Gerardo Alvarez-Herrera; Adriel R. Gentil; Sergio Bogan; Nicolás R. Chimento; Jordi A. García Marsà; Gastón Lo Coco; Sergio E. Miquel; Fátima F. Brito; Ezequiel I. Vera; Valeria S. Perez Loinaze; Mariela S. Fernández; Leonardo Salgado	2019	Chorillo Formation (Late Cretaceous, Maastrichtian)	Argentina (Santa Cruz)	Potentially a neornithean	
Koparion	Daniel J. Chure	1994	Morrison Formation (Late Jurassic, Kimmeridgian)	United States (Utah)	Known from a single tooth which may have come from a troodontid	
Koreaceratops	Yuong-Nam Lee; Michael J. Ryan; Yoshitsugu Kobayashi	2011	Sihwa Formation (Early Cretaceous, Albian)	South Korea (Gyeonggi)	Possessed elongated neural spines on its caudal vertebrae, originally hypothesized to be a swimming organ despite later study finding it to have lived in an arid environment	
Koreanosaurus	Min Huh; Dae-Gil Lee; Jung-Kyun Kim; Jong-Deock Lim; Pascal Godefroit	2011	Seonso Conglomerate (Late Cretaceous, Campanian)	South Korea (South Jeolla)	Had short but powerful forelimbs, suggesting it may have been a quadruped	
Koshisaurus	Masateru Shibata; Yoichi Azuma	2015	Kitadani Formation (Early Cretaceous, Aptian)	Japan (Fukui)	Distinguished from other hadrosauroids by the presence of an antorbital fossa	
Kosmoceratops	Scott D. Sampson; Mark A. Loewen; Andrew A. Farke; Eric M. Roberts; Catherine A. Forster; Joshua A. Smith; Alan L. Titus	2010	Kaiparowits Formation (Late Cretaceous, Campanian)	United States (Utah)	Possessed fifteen horns and horn-like structures, including eight hornlets folding down from the top of the frill	
Kotasaurus	P. M. Yadagiri	1988	Kota Formation (Early Jurassic to Middle Jurassic, Pliensbachian to Callovian)	India (Telangana)	The neural spines of its vertebrae were massively constructed, which is a basal trait	
Koutalisaurus	Albert Prieto-Márquez; Rodrigo Gaete; Gonzalo Rivas; Àngel Galobart; Marc Boada	2006	Tremp Group (Late Cretaceous, Maastrichtian)	Spain (Catalonia)	Usually seen as a synonym of Pararhabdodon, but it could also be its own taxon	
Kritosaurus	Barnum Brown	1910	Kirtland Formation (Late Cretaceous, Campanian)	United States (New Mexico)	Had an elevated nasal bone with an enlarged nasal cavity to match	
Kryptodrakon	Brian Andres; James M. Clark; Xing Xu	2014	Shishugou Formation (Middle Jurassic to Late Jurassic, Callovian to Oxfordian)	China (Xinjiang)	The oldest known pterosaur with the wing ratio characteristic of pterodactyloids	
Kryptops	Paul C. Sereno; Stephen L. Brusatte	2008	Elrhaz Formation (Early Cretaceous, Barremian to Albian)	Niger (Agadez)	Postcranial remains referred to this genus have been later found to come from an allosauroid	
Kulceratops	Lev A. Nessov	1995	Khodzhakul Formation (Late Cretaceous, Cenomanian)	Uzbekistan (Karakalpakstan)	Only known from fragments of a jaw and teeth	
Kulindadromeus	Pascal Godefroit; Sofia M. Sinitsa; Danielle Dhouailly; Yuri L. Bolotsky; Alexander V. Sizov; Maria E. McNamara; Michael J. Benton; Paul Spagna	2014	Ukureyskaya Formation (Middle Jurassic to Late Jurassic, Bajocian to Tithonian)	Russia (Zabaykalsky Krai)	An ornithischian that preserves evidence of filaments, suggesting that protofeathers were basal to Dinosauria as a whole	
Kunbarrasaurus	Lucy G. Leahey; Ralph E. Molnar; Kenneth Carpenter; Lawrence M. Witmer; Steven W. Salisbury	2015	Allaru Formation (Early Cretaceous, Albian)	Australia (Queensland)	Preserves stomach contents containing ferns, fruit, and seeds	
Kundurosaurus	Pascal Godefroit; Yuri L. Bolotsky; Pascaline Lauters	2012	Udurchukan Formation (Late Cretaceous, Maastrichtian)	Russia (Amur Oblast)	May be synonymous with Kerberosaurus	
Kunpengopterus	Xiaolin Wang; Alexander W. A. Kellner; Shunxing Jiang; Xin Cheng; Xi Meng; Taissa Rodrigues	2010	Tiaojishan Formation (Late Jurassic, Oxfordian)	China (Liaoning)	The species K. antipollicatus has an opposed thumb, the oldest occurrence of this in the fossil record	
Kuru	James G. Napoli; Alexander A. Ruebenstahl; Bhart-Anjan S. Bhullar; Alan H. Turner; Mark A. Norell	2021	Baruungoyot Formation (Late Cretaceous, Maastrichtian)	Mongolia (Ömnögovi)	Had been informally referred to as "Airakoraptor" prior to its formal description	
Kurupi	Fabiano V. Iori; Hermínio I. de Araújo-Júnior; Sandra A. Simionato Tavares; Thiago S. Marinho; Agustín G. Martinelli	2021	Marília Formation (Late Cretaceous, Maastrichtian)	Brazil (Minas Gerais)	Would have had a stiff tail as indicated by the anatomy of its caudal vertebrae	
Kuszholia	Lev A. Nessov	1992	Bissekty Formation (Late Cretaceous, Turonian)	Uzbekistan (Bukhara)	Has been compared in size with a chicken	
Kwanasaurus	Jeffrey W. Martz; Bryan J. Small	2019	Chinle Formation (Late Triassic, Norian)	United States (Colorado)	A "silesaurid" with specialized adaptations for herbivory	

== See also ==
- List of Mesozoic bird-line archosaur genera (A–B)
- List of Mesozoic bird-line archosaur genera (C–F)
- List of Mesozoic bird-line archosaur genera (L–O)
- List of Mesozoic bird-line archosaur genera (P–S)
- List of Mesozoic bird-line archosaur genera (T–Z)
