= Jiutaisaurus =

Jiutaisaurus Temporal range: Early-Late Cretaceous, 125–93.9 Ma

Scientific classification
- Kingdom: Animalia
- Phylum: Chordata
- Class: Reptilia
- Clade: Dinosauria
- Clade: Saurischia
- Clade: †Sauropodomorpha
- Clade: †Sauropoda
- Clade: †Macronaria
- Clade: †Titanosauriformes
- Genus: †Jiutaisaurus; Wu et al., 2006

Type species
- †Jiutaisaurus xidiensis Wu et al., 2006

Extinct genus of dinosaurs

Jiutaisaurus (meaning "Jiutai lizard") is a genus of sauropod dinosaur from the Quantou Formation of Jilin, China. The formation dates from the Early - Late Cretaceous boundary. The type species, Jiutaisaurus xidiensis, was described by Wu et al. in 2006, and is based on eighteen vertebrae. It probably lived alongside Changchunsaurus and Helioceratops.

== Discovery and naming ==
In September 2003, a team from Jilin University conducted a fossil excavation in Xidi Village, Jiutai, and recovered 18 caudal vertebrae from a sauropod, as well as some other fossils. In March 2006, Wu Wenhao, Dong Zhiming, Sun Yuewu, Li Chuntian, and Li Tao described the vertebrae as a new genus and species, Jiutaisaurus xidiensis (Chinese: 西地九台龙; pinyin: Xīdì Jiǔtáilóng), named for the discovery site.

=== Fossil record ===
Jiutaisaurus xidiensis is known only from the holotype specimen, CAD-02, which was recovered from the Cretaceous-aged Quantou Formation. The specimen consists of 18 articulated caudal vertebrae, hypothesized to represent the 11th to 28th vertebrae of the caudal series, and 13 haemal arches.

== Classification ==
In their original description, Wu and colleagues tentatively classified Jiutaisaurus as a titanosaur, also noting similarities to Huabeisauridae and Brachiosauridae. Subsequent authors have considered it to be an indeterminate titanosauriform. Wilson and Upchurch, in 2009, considered it a nomen dubium.
