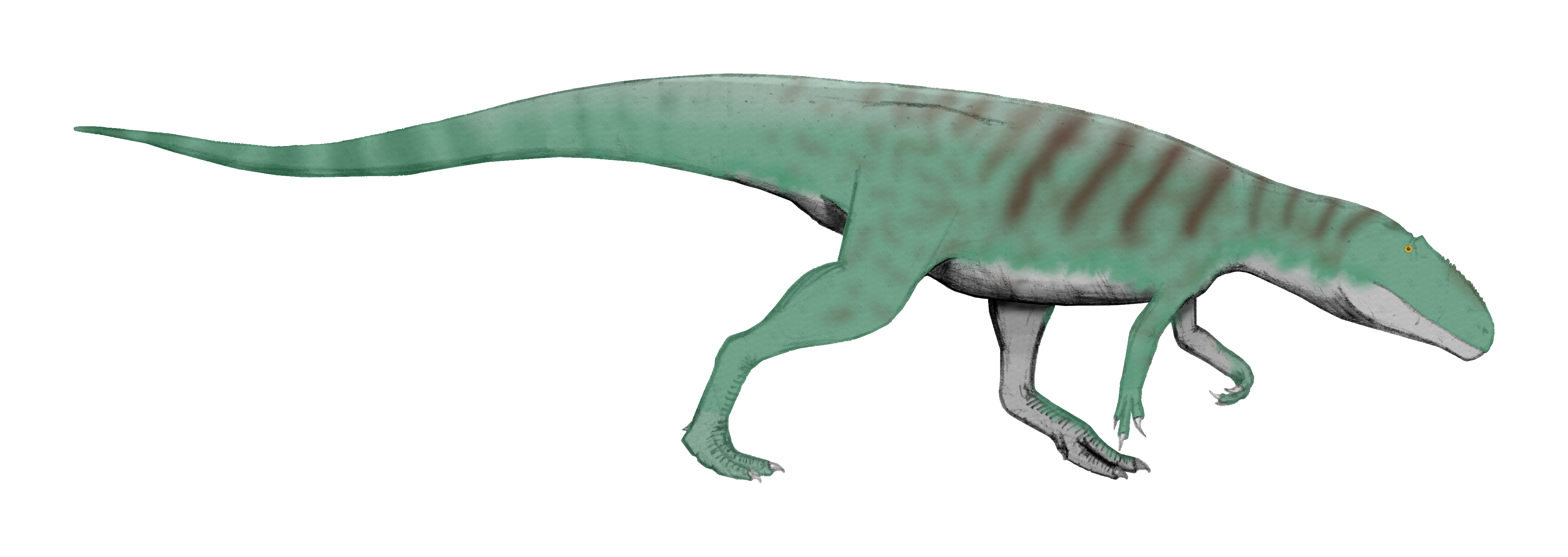
- Speculative life restoration based on other theropods

Scientific classification
- Domain: Eukaryota
- Kingdom: Animalia
- Phylum: Chordata
- Clade: Dinosauria
- Clade: Saurischia
- Clade: Theropoda
- Clade: Tetanurae
- Genus: †Kaijiangosaurus; He, 1984

Type species
- †Kaijiangosaurus lini He, 1984

= Kaijiangosaurus =

Kaijiangosaurus Temporal range: Middle Jurassic Bathonian–Callovian

Extinct genus of dinosaurs

Kaijiangosaurus (meaning "Kaijiang lizard") is a genus of carnivorous tetanuran theropod dinosaur from the Middle Jurassic of China. In 1984 He Xinlu named and described the type species Kaijiangosaurus lini. The generic name refers to the River (jiang) Kai. The specific name honours the paleontologist Lin Wenqiu.

== Discovery ==
The holotype specimen, CCG 20020, was discovered before 1984 in Sichuan, in a layer of the Xiashaximiao Formation dating from the Bathonian-Callovian. The specimen consists of a fragmentary skeleton lacking the skull. The holotype proper contains the intercentrum of the atlas and the third to ninth neck vertebrae. Other elements have been designated as a paratype, including fragmentary remains of the skull, nine teeth, elements of the pectoral girdle, a forelimb, and a hindlimb. Another paratype is the thighbone of a probably smaller individual. Holtz et al. (2004) mentioned much more complete specimens, but they are undescribed. There have been doubts about the validity of Kaijiangosaurus. It has been suggested that it should be regarded as a synonym of Gasosaurus, which was found in the same strata as Kaijiangosaurus, the Lower Shaximiao Formation, or of Xuanhanosaurus.

== Description ==
Kaijiangosaurus had a length of about five metres. He mentioned some diagnostic traits. The jugal is straight-edged at the front, deeper at the rear. The teeth are of the megalosaurid type. Their leading edge has only few serrations, near the tip. The cervicals are short, wide and narrow in the middle. The front cervicals have spines with a concave trailing edge. These neck vertebrae are about as wide as they are long; their spines are low and wide. The centra of the rear cervical are concave at their back; their spines are long and narrow. The dorsals are platycoelous and have smooth sides lacking pleurocoels. The front tail vertebrae are also platycoelous, with a flat front and concave rear; the rear caudals are amphicoelous. The tail vertebrae have flat undersides without a midline groove. The scapula is rather straight with only a relative constriction at the lower end and a light expansion at the upper end. The coracoid is oval and has a thick ridge at the upper outer side. With the humerus, the deltopectoral crest is triangular; the shaft has an oval cross-section. The ulna is short and expanded at both ends. The three claws of the hand are strongly curved. Both ends of the thighbone are expanded; the neck is somewhat directed to the rear. The lesser trochanter is low, with a triangular profile. The middle metatarsals are not fused, nor is the third metatarsal constricted at the top.

== Classification ==
He originally placed Kaijiangosaurus in the Megalosauridae. Modern analysis suggests it is a basal member of the Tetanurae, or perhaps the Averostra. Due to the fragmentary nature of the remains, it is uncertain what type of tetanuran theropod it is, though it may be a primitive carnosaur.
