= Quantou Formation =

Geological formation in Jilin, China

- Stratigraphic range: Aptian to Early Cenomanian
- Type: Geological formation
- Unit of: Songliao Basin
- Sub-units: First through Fourth Members
- Underlies: Qingshankou Formation
- Overlies: Denglouku Formation
- Thickness: 190 to 1379 m

Lithology
- Primary: Sandstone
- Other: Mudstone

Location
- Region: Jilin
- Country: China

The Quantou Formation is a Cretaceous Period (Mesozoic Era) geologic formation in China. It is primarily Albian in age. It has been explored for its potential as a tight oil reservoir.

Dinosaur remains are among the fossils that have been recovered from the formation.

== Fossil content ==
Color key: Taxon / Reclassified taxon / Taxon falsely reported as present / Dubious taxon or junior synonym / Ichnotaxon / Ootaxon / Morphotaxon	Notes; Uncertain or tentative taxa are in small text; ~~crossed out~~ taxa are discredited.

=== Dinosaurs ===
==== Ornithischians ====
Ornithischians of the Quantou Formation
Genus	Species	Location	Stratigraphic position	Material	Notes	Image
Changchunsaurus	C. parvus				A thescelosaurid ornithischian	
Helioceratops	H. brachygnathus				A neoceratopsian	

==== Saurischians ====
Saurischians of the Quantou Formation
Genus	Species	Location	Stratigraphic position	Material	Notes	Image
Dromaeosauridae indet.	Indeterminate				A large dromaeosaurid theropod	
Jiutaisaurus	J. xidiensis				A titanosauriform sauropod	

=== Mammals ===
Mammals of the Quantou Formation
Genus	Species	Location	Stratigraphic position	Material	Notes	Image
Gobiconodon	G. gongzhulingensis				A gobiconodontid eutriconodont	
Zhangolestes	Z. jilinensis				A zalambdalestid eutherian	

=== Oofossils ===
Oofossils of the Quantou Formation
Genus	Species	Location	Stratigraphic position	Material	Notes	Image
Jilinoolithus	J. lamellotestus				Likely laid by non-avian maniraptoran theropod	

== See also ==
- List of dinosaur-bearing rock formations

== Bibliography ==
- Weishampel, David B.; Dodson, Peter; and Osmólska, Halszka (eds.): The Dinosauria, 2nd, Berkeley: University of California Press. 861 pp. ISBN 0-520-24209-2.
