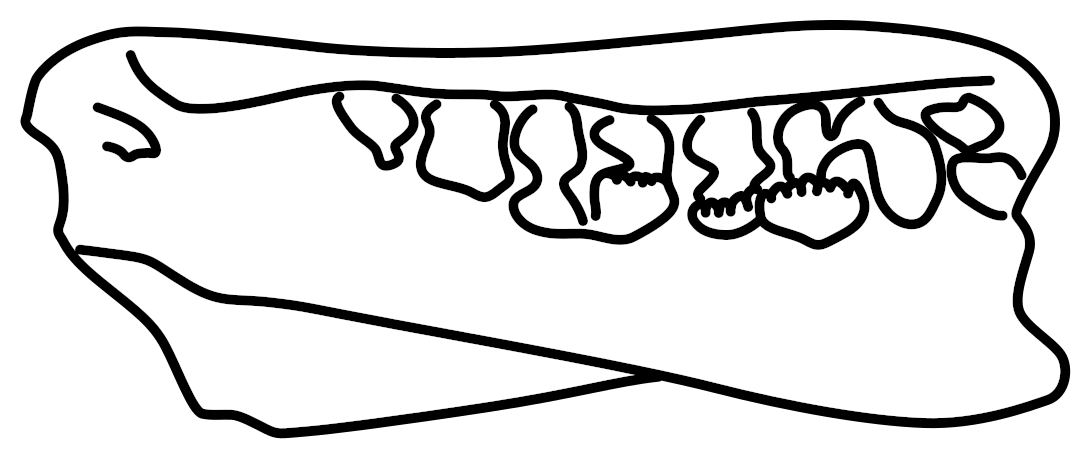
- Holotype maxilla of Kulceratops in ventromedial view

Scientific classification
- Kingdom: Animalia
- Phylum: Chordata
- Class: Reptilia
- Clade: Dinosauria
- Clade: †Ornithischia
- Clade: †Ceratopsia
- Clade: †Neoceratopsia
- Genus: †Kulceratops; Nesov, 1995

Type species
- †Kulceratops kulensis Nesov, 1995

= Kulceratops =

Kulceratops Temporal range: late Albian ~105–100 Ma

Extinct genus of dinosaurs

Kulceratops is a genus of ceratopsian dinosaur from the Early Cretaceous. It lived in the late Albian stage. It is one of the few ceratopsians known from this period. However, the fossils from this genus have been sparse: only jaw and tooth fragments have been found so far.

== Description ==
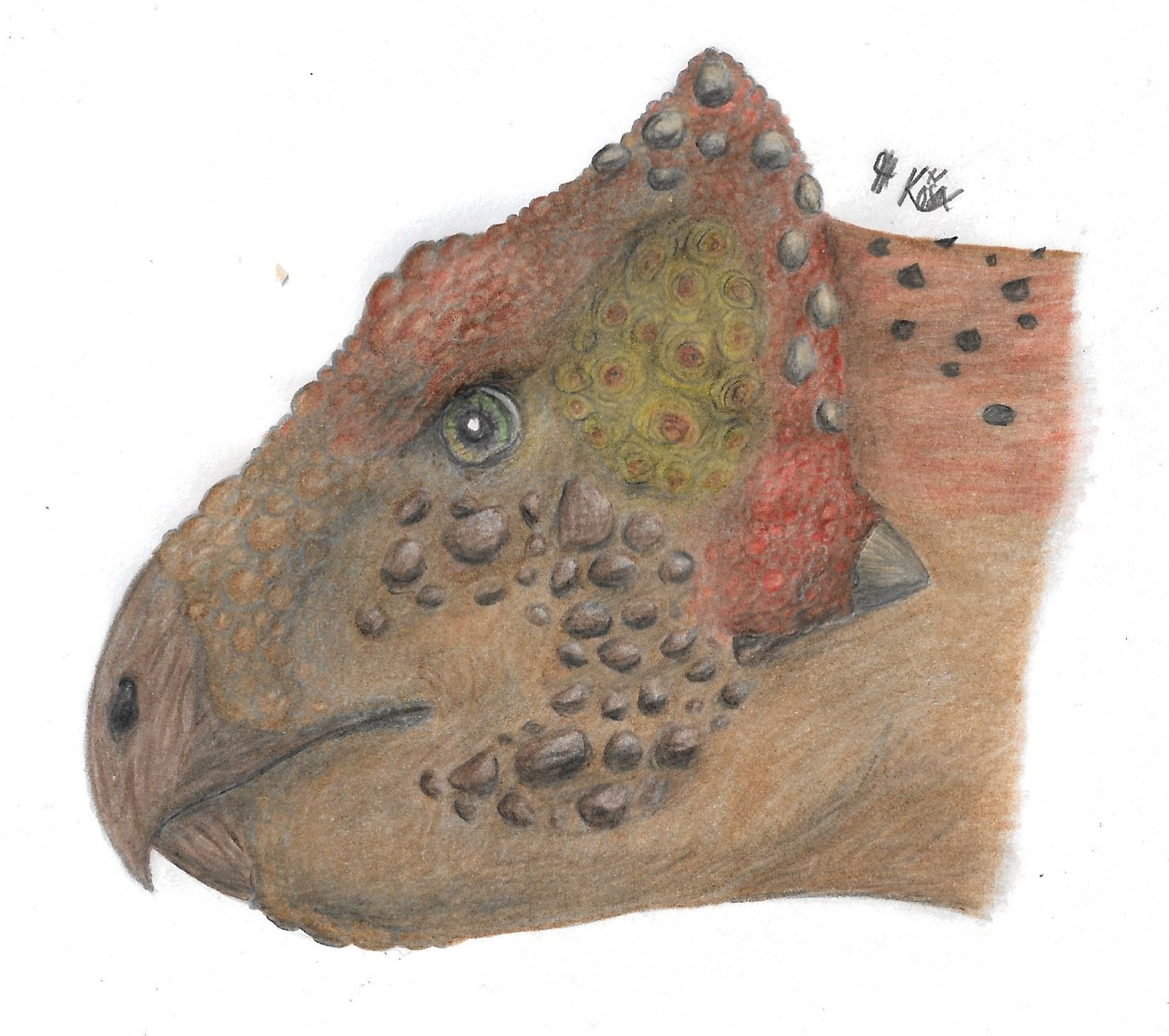
Life restoration

Kulceratops was named by Lev Alexandrovich Nesov in 1995. The type species is Kulceratops kulensis. Both the genus name and the specific name are derived from the Khodzhakul Formation, kul meaning "lake" in Uzbek. Its fossils were found in Uzbekistan, central Asia. The holotype, CCMGE No. 495/12457, was in 1914 discovered by geologist Andrei Dmitrievich Arkhangelsky. It consists of a left maxilla, of which the front end has been broken off.

== Classification ==
Kulceratops belonged to the Ceratopsia (the name is Greek for "horned face"), a group of herbivorous dinosaurs with parrot-like beaks which thrived in North America and Asia during the Cretaceous Period. As Kulceratops is the oldest known neoceratopian, Nesov assigned it to a special Archaeoceratopsidae. Later workers considered it a member of the Protoceratopidae or at least a basal member of Neoceratopia. Due to the paucity of the remains, it is considered a nomen dubium

== Diet ==
Kulceratops, like all ceratopsians, was a herbivore. During the early Cretaceous, flowering plants were "geographically limited on the landscape", and so it is likely that this dinosaur fed on the predominant plants of the era: ferns, cycads and conifers. It would have used its sharp ceratopsian beak to bite off the leaves or needles.

== See also ==
- Timeline of ceratopsian research
