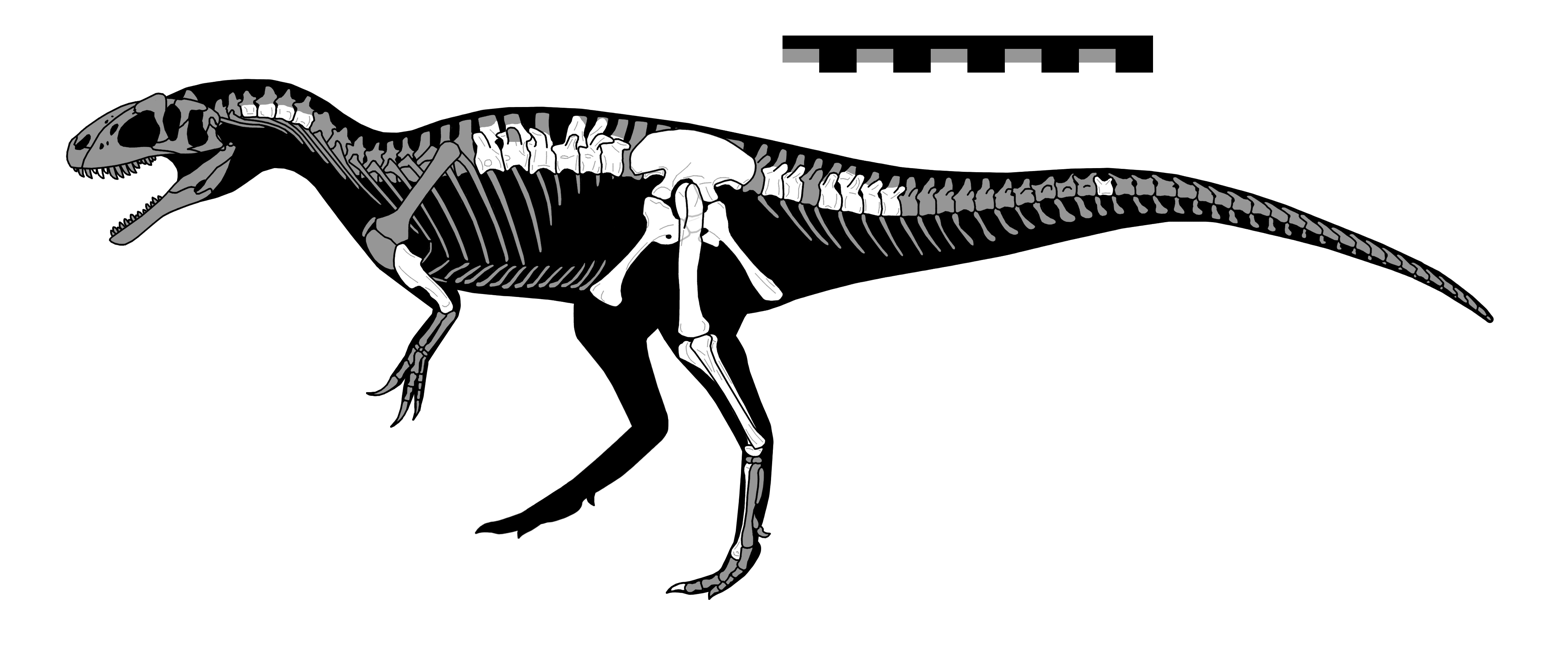
- Skeletal restoration illustrating known material in white

Scientific classification
- Kingdom: Animalia
- Phylum: Chordata
- Class: Reptilia
- Clade: Dinosauria
- Clade: Saurischia
- Clade: Theropoda
- Clade: Avetheropoda
- Genus: †Gasosaurus; Dong & Tang, 1985

Type species
- †Gasosaurus constructus Dong & Tang, 1985

= Gasosaurus =

Gasosaurus Temporal range: Middle-Late Jurassic, 171.6–161.2 Ma

Extinct genus of reptiles

Gasosaurus (/ɡˈæsəˈsɔːrəs/) is a genus of tetanuran theropod that lived approximately 171.6 to 161.2 million years ago during the middle of the Jurassic Period. The name "Gasosaurus" is derived from the English "gasoline" and the Greek σαῦρος (sauros) ("lizard / generic reptile"). Only one species is currently recognised, G. constructus, from which the specific name honours the gasoline company that found the Dashanpu fossil quarry in Sichuan Province, China, now named as the Lower Shaximiao Formation.

== Discovery and naming ==
The first and to date only fossils, albeit postcranial (missing the skull), were recovered in 1985 during the construction of a gas facility, which explains the dinosaur's unusual name. It consists of laterally compressed teeth, 4 cervical, 7 dorsal, 5 sacral, and 7 caudal vertebrae, both humeri, and highly abraded and reconstructed pelvic and hind limb material that includes the left ilium, left ischium, left pubis, left femur, left tibia and left fibula. The fossils were defined as the type species Gasosaurus constructus by the paleontologists Dong Zhiming and Tang Zilu.

== Description ==
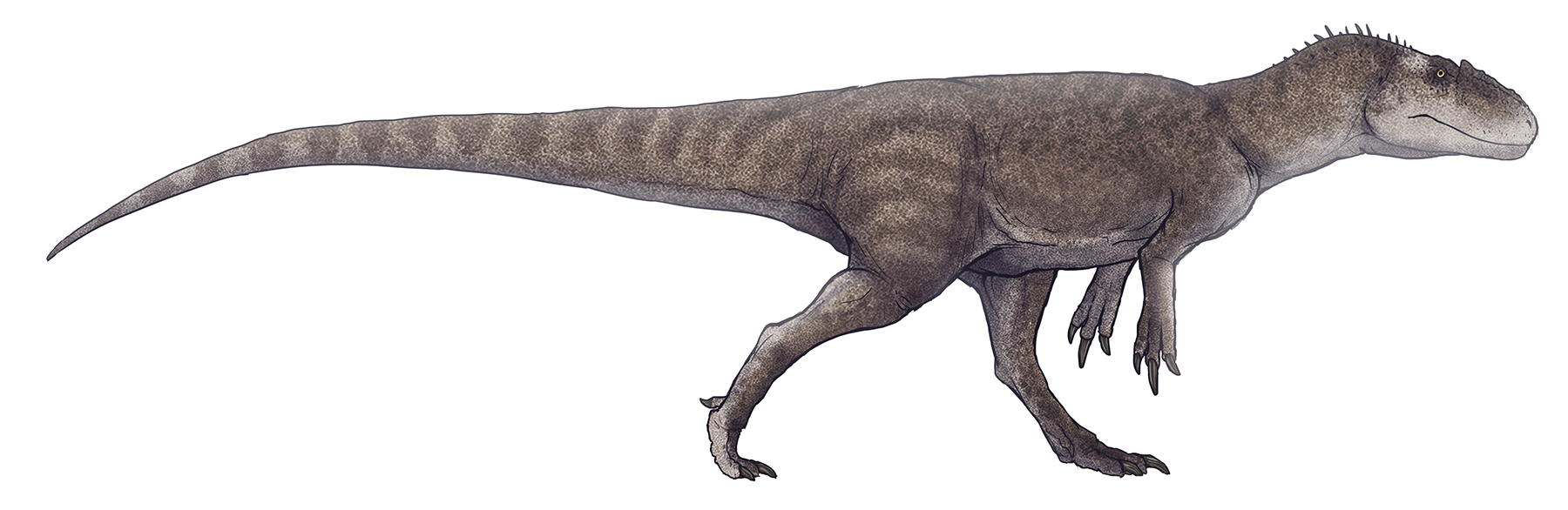
Speculative life restoration

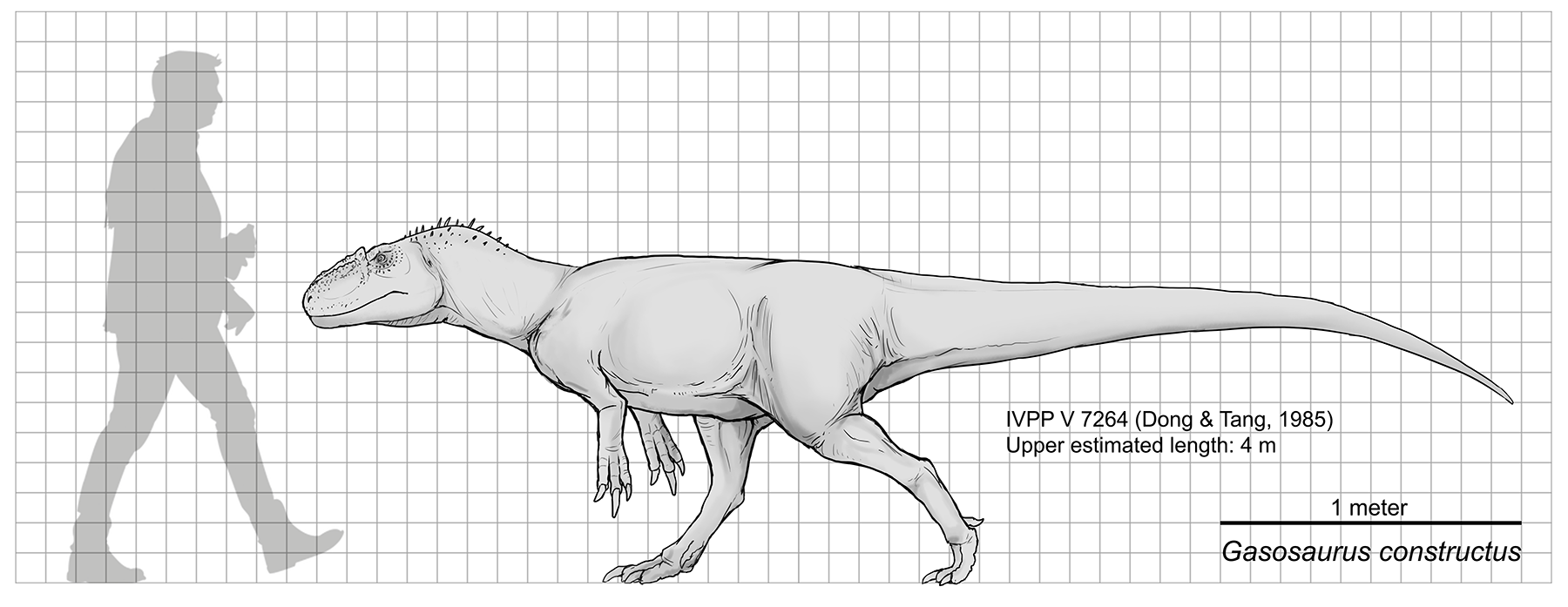
Scale diagram

Gasosaurus is a carnivorous theropod with strong legs but short arms. It measured between 3.5 to 4 metres (11 to 13 ft) in length, with a weight of around 150 kilograms (330 lb). However, some estimates put its weight as high as 400 kilograms (880 lb), as very little is known about it.

Many potentially informative features of the holotype skeleton (IVPP V7264) are difficult to assess based on published descriptions and images. The taxon represents a tetanuran based on the presence of a pubic peduncle of the ilium that is substantially larger than the ischial peduncle. Examination of casts reveals that the lesser trochanter does not rise above the level of the femoral head, and instead, the proximal portion of the femoral head is broken and the lesser trochanter reaches approximately midlevel of the head as in non-coelurosaurian tetanurans.

Furthermore, it is recognized by an amphiplatyan cervical centra with incipient weak ventral keel, dorsals with amphiplatyan centra, low neural arches and plate-like neural spines, dorsal neural spines lacking expanded bulks at tips, five sacral centra and arches firmly fused while neural spines not fused, presence of a humeral foramen, low ilium with a less developed anterior process, and distal ends of pubis and ischium expanded but lacking foot-like processes.

== Classification ==
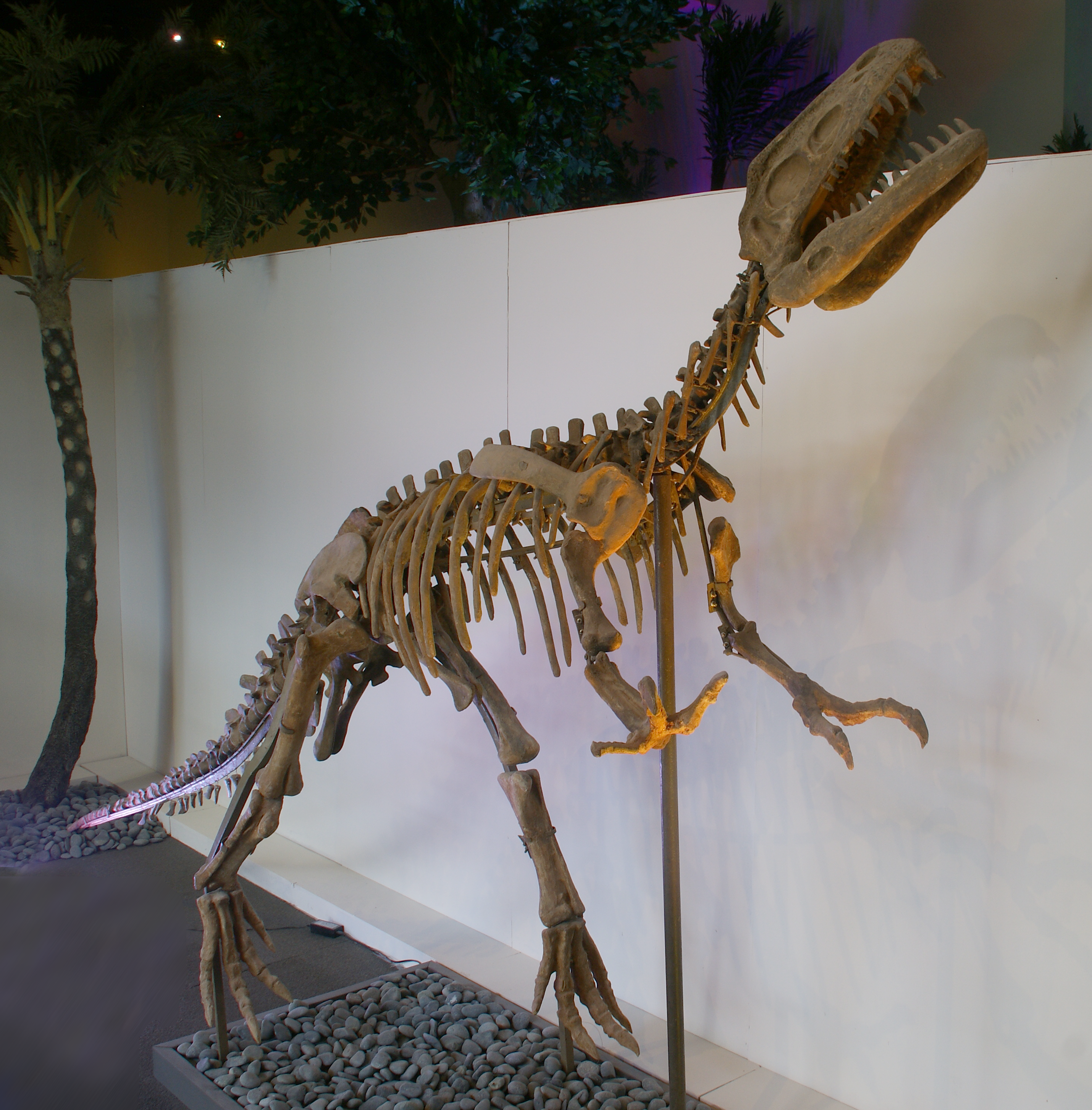
Reconstructed skeleton with hypothetical head, Bishop Museum

Traditionally thought to be a megalosauroid, Holtz (2000) found it to be a basal coelurosaurian, although later Holtz et al. (2004) suggested it was a basal carnosaur (possibly a metriacanthosaurid) on the basis of data from undescribed specimens. It may in fact be the most basal coelurosaurian yet known, or may even be close to the common ancestor of the two groups; in any case, it represents one of the oldest definitive tetanuran theropods. Some paleontologists have speculated that Gasosaurus and Kaijiangosaurus may be one and the same species.

Because of the fragmentary nature of the known Gasosaurus fossils, it has an uncertain position within Tetanurae, but probably lays outside Coelurosauria. A detailed restudy of the holotype is underway that may change its classification.

== Paleoecology ==
Gasosarurus lived during the mid-Jurassic period (Bathonian and/ or Callovian stages), around 164 million years ago. It coexisted with other mid-range theropods such as Chuandongocoelurus and Kaijiangosaurus, two other dinosaurs found from the Lower Shaximiao Formation. These three taxa pertain to medium to large bodied theropods and are known from associated prostcranial skeletons. China, boasts the highest taxic diversity of Middle Jurassic theropods of all body sizes from anywhere in the world. Most Middle Jurassic theropods from China are 'medium-sized', as are the majority of Middle Jurassic theropods globally.

These similar dinosaurs show an intriguing combination of derived tetanuran synapomorphies and primitive features shared with non-tetanurans, which suggest they occupy a basal position within Tetanurae. Understanding the anatomy of Chinese Jurassic taxa may reveal further details of primitive tetanuran anatomy and help resolve the early evolution of this successful theropod clade. Future exploration of the Chinese Middle Jurassic theropod record may bring new insights into the diversification of Tetanurae, the origin of larger body sizes among more derived theropods, and Middle Jurassic paleobiogeography.
