= Vermillion River Formation =

Coordinates: 49.53°N 100.56°W

- Stratigraphic range: Late Cretaceous
- Type: Geological formation

Location
- Region: North America

The Vermillion River Formation is a geological formation in Manitoba, Canada whose strata date back to the Late Cretaceous. Dinosaur remains are among the fossils that have been recovered from the formation.

== Vertebrate paleofauna ==
Dinosaurs of the Vermillion River Formation
| Genus | Species | Location | Stratigraphic position | Abundance | Description | Images |
|---|---|---|---|---|---|---|
| Hesperornis | H. regalis | | | | | Hesperornis |

== See also ==
- List of dinosaur-bearing rock formations
