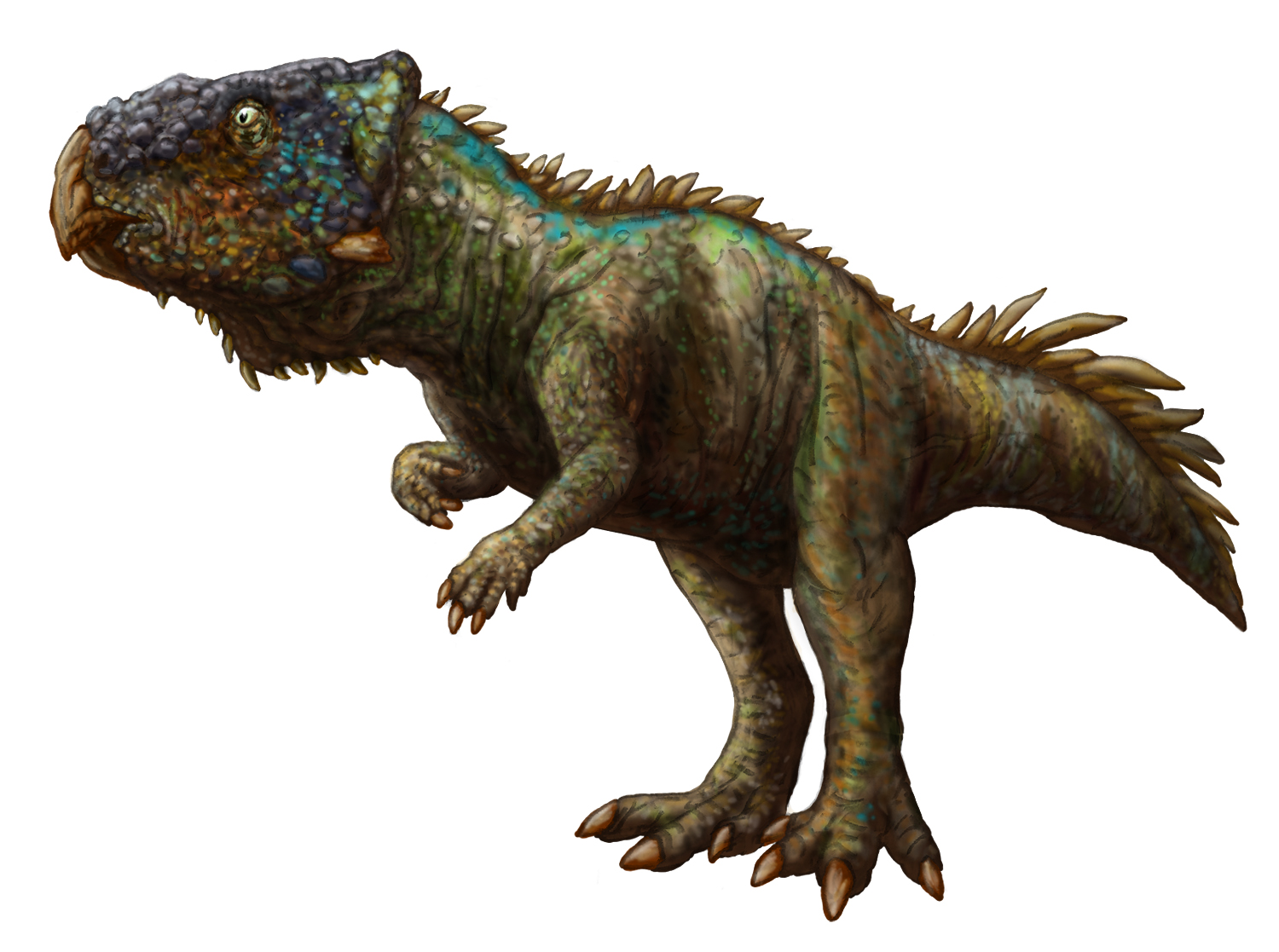
- Restoration

Scientific classification
- Kingdom: Animalia
- Phylum: Chordata
- Class: Reptilia
- Clade: Dinosauria
- Clade: †Ornithischia
- Clade: †Ceratopsia
- Family: †Archaeoceratopsidae
- Genus: †Helioceratops; Jin L. et al., 2009
- Species: †H. brachygnathus

Binomial name
- †Helioceratops brachygnathus Jin L. et al., 2009

= Helioceratops =

Helioceratops Temporal range: Early-Late Cretaceous, Aptian–Cenomanian

Extinct genus of dinosaurs

Helioceratops is a genus of herbivorous neoceratopsian dinosaur from the mid-Cretaceous of China.

== Discovery and naming ==
In 2000 and 2002, at the Liufangzi site of China's eastern Jilin province, excavations took place during which the jaws were found of a ceratopsian new to science.

The type species Helioceratops brachygnathus was named and described in 2009 by Jin Liyong, Chen Jun, Zan Shuqin and Pascal Godefroit. The generic name means "sun horned face" from the Greek helios, "sun", keras, "horn" and ops, "face". The reference is that the Sun rises in the East and ceratopsians also "rose" in the East; i.e. they originated in the Orient. The name also refers to a close relationship with Auroraceratops, the "dawn ceratopian". The specific name means "short jaw" from the Greek βραχύς, brachys and γνάθος, gnathos, in reference to the distinguishing short lower jaw.

Helioceratops was discovered in a layer of the Quantou Formation, dating from the Albian-Cenomanian at the boundary between the Early Cretaceous and the Late Cretaceous, about a hundred million years old. It is known from its holotype JLUM L0204-Y-3, a dentary of the right lower jaw. The paratype is specimen JLUM L0204-Y-4, a left maxilla of the upper jaw. Both fossils were discovered at a close distance from each other and indicate animals of about the same size; however, it could not be proven they belonged to a single individual.

== Description ==
Helioceratops was a relatively small animal. In 2010, Gregory S. Paul estimated a length of 1.3 m (4.3 ft) and a weight of twenty kilogrammes.

The describing authors established three distinguishing traits. They are autapomorphies, unique derived qualities, in this case relative to all other neoceratopsians. The ramus or horizontal branch of the dentary is deep and short, the tooth row being but 60% longer than its maximal height. The facet of the front dentary contacting the lower process of the predentary is steeply inclined under an angle of 130° with the underside edge of the dentary. On the lower jaw teeth, the denticles and secondary vertical ridges are grouped asymmetrically relative to the primary ridge, with up to nine secondary ridges in front (mesial) of the main ridge and four secondary rides at it rear (distal).

The number of teeth in the upper jaws is unknown. The lower jaws bear ten to eleven teeth. Their front teeth are relatively small, with a triangular cross-section. The rear teeth are larger and ovate in section, a derived trait.

== Phylogeny ==
Helioceratops was placed in the Neoceratopsia, in a moderately basal position, outside of the Coronosauria. Its close relationship to the latter clade would indicate its origin in Asia.

== Paleoecology ==
Helioceratops was a herbivore. It may have shared its habitat with Changchunsaurus.

== See also ==
- Timeline of ceratopsian research
