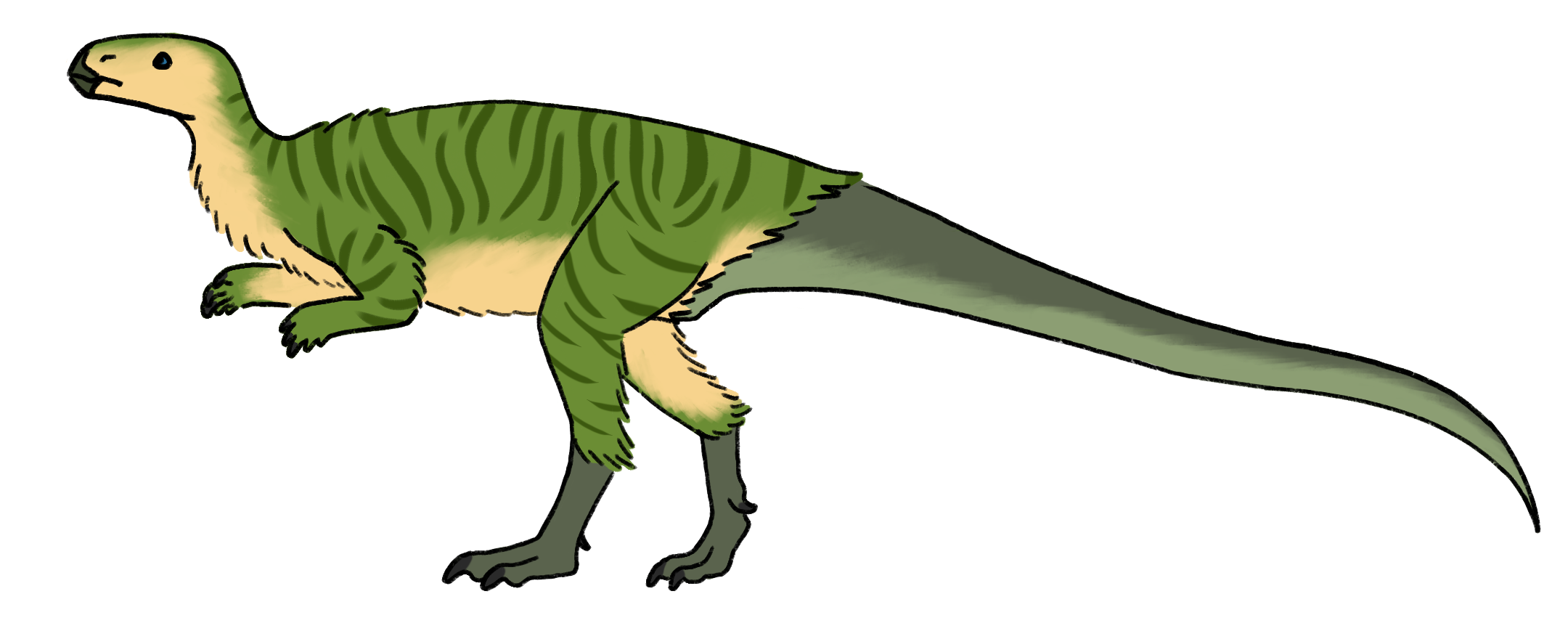
- Life reconstruction of Changchunsaurus

Scientific classification
- Kingdom: Animalia
- Phylum: Chordata
- Class: Reptilia
- Clade: Dinosauria
- Clade: †Ornithischia
- Family: †Thescelosauridae
- Genus: †Changchunsaurus; Zan et al., 2005
- Species: †C. parvus

Binomial name
- †Changchunsaurus parvus Zan et al., 2005

= Changchunsaurus =

Changchunsaurus Temporal range: Early-Late Cretaceous, Aptian–Cenomanian

Extinct genus of dinosaurs

Changchunsaurus (meaning "Changchun lizard") is an extinct monotypic genus of small herbivorous neornithischian dinosaur from Early or Late Cretaceous deposits of Gongzhuling, Jilin, China. It is the first named dinosaur genus from that region.

== Description ==
Changchunsaurus was first named by Zan Shu-Qin, Chen Jun, Jin Li-Yong and Li Tao in 2005. The type and only known species is C. parvus ("parvus" meaning "petite"), named for its small size. It is known from a skull and skeleton and additional skull fragments. All specimens of Changchunsaurus were collected from the Quantou Formation of the Songliao Basin, dating to the Aptian–Cenomanian stages. Changchunsaurus is based on the holotype JLUM L0403-j–Zn2, a skeleton and skull, with a premaxilla (upper beak) and partial lower jaw also known. Only the skull was figured and described in the official description.

According to Zan et al. 2005, who described it, the animal shows a combination of features like those of derived ornithopods (reduction in size or loss of some skull fenestrae or holes), and features like those of more basal ornithopods (for example, five teeth in each premaxilla, short toothless portion of upper beak, and a small gap between beak teeth and cheek teeth). There is a projection that sticks out from the side of the jugal or cheekbone, with what is described as a "nubble structure". The type individual was a small animal, around 1 meter long (3.3 feet, with a skull 11.5 centimeters long (4.5 inches). It was originally classified as a basal ornithopod, family unknown, although it was not included in a formal phylogenetic analysis.

Later, some referred specimens were described and in 2010 its cranial anatomy was revised.

== Classification ==
In Butler et al., 2011, the postcranial osteology was described for the first time and a large phylogenetic analysis confirmed its position as a basal ornithopod which was found to be closely related to another Chinese ornithopod, Jeholosaurus and later to the newly described Mongolian ornithopod Haya. Han et al. named this clade "Jeholosauridae" in 2012.

The following cladogram was based on analysis by Makovicky et al., 2011.

- Neornithischia
  - Stormbergia
  - - Agilisaurus
    - - Hexinlusaurus
      - Cerapoda
        - Marginocephalia
        - Ornithopoda
          - Orodromeus
          - - Jeholosauridae
              - Haya
              - - Changchunsaurus
                - Jeholosaurus
            - - Hypsilophodon
              - to Iguanodontia

== Palaeobiology ==
=== Life history ===
Changchunsaurus had an exceptionally slow growth rate, with its life history being among the slowest of all known dinosaurs. It would have reached sexual maturity at around 7 or 8 years of age and had a very long lifespan.
